= List of bays of the Inner Hebrides =

This List of Bays of Inner Hebrides summarises the bays that are located on the islands of the Inner Hebrides in Scotland.

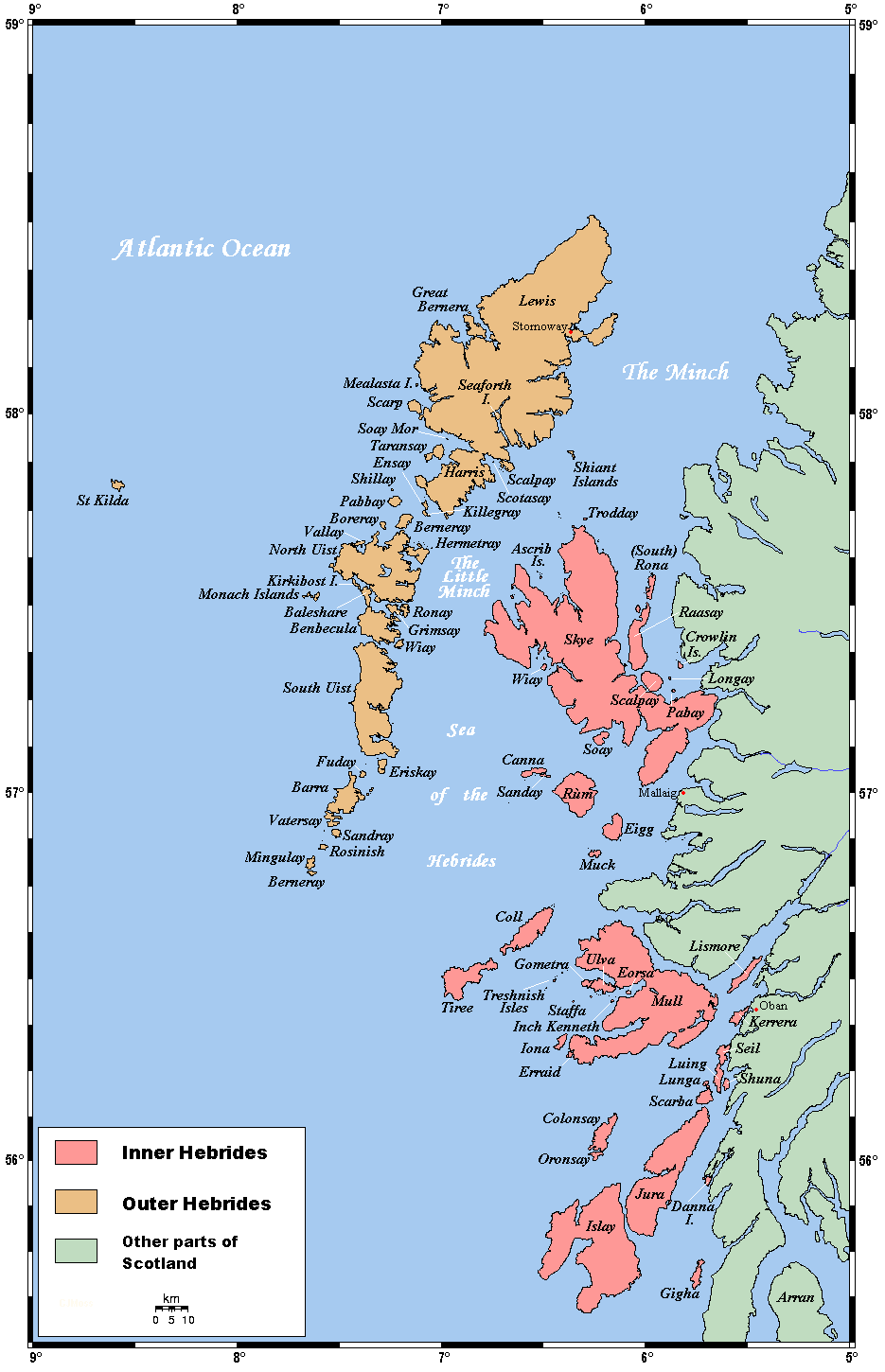
A map of the Inner and Outer Hebrides in Scotland. The Inner Hebrides are shown in Magenta

== Crowlin Islands ==
=== Eilean Mòr ===
The island of Eilean Mòr has the following bays:

| Name | County | Nearest Village | Coordinates | Image | Notes |
|---|---|---|---|---|---|
| Camas na h-Annait | Inverness-shire | | 57°20′42″N 5°49′38″W | | |

== Firth of Lorn ==
=== Eilean Dubh Mòr ===
The island of Eilean Dubh Mòr has the following bays:

| Name | County | Nearest Village | Coordinates | Image | Notes |
|---|---|---|---|---|---|
| Port Bàn | Argyllshire | | 56°13′51″N 5°43′31″W | | |

=== Kerrera ===
The island of Kerrera has the following bays:

| Name | County | Nearest Village | Coordinates | Image | Notes |
|---|---|---|---|---|---|
| Ardantrive Bay | Argyllshire | Oban | 56°25′09″N 5°29′44″W | | |
| Barr-nam-boc Bay | Argyllshire | Oban | 56°23′55″N 5°34′04″W | | |
| Bernera Bay | Argyllshire | Oban | 56°29′32″N 5°34′42″W | | |
| The Horseshoe | Argyllshire | Oban | 56°23′44″N 5°31′31″W | | |
| The Little HorseShoe | Argyllshire | Oban | 56°23′15″N 5°32′06″W | | |
| Slatrach Bay | Argyllshire | Oban | 56°24′39″N 5°32′25″W | | |

=== Lismore ===
The island of Lismore has the following bays:

| Name | County | Nearest Village | Coordinates | Image | Notes |
|---|---|---|---|---|---|
| Achadun Bay | Argyllshire | Benderloch | 56°29′54″N 5°34′00″W | | |
| Bàgh Clach an Dobhrain | Argyllshire | Benderloch | 56°28′29″N 5°34′42″W | | |
| Bernera Bay | Argyllshire | Benderloch | 56°29′32″N 5°34′42″W | | |
| Camas Mhic Lairtidh | Argyllshire | Benderloch | 56°33′12″N 5°27′41″W | | |
| Miller's Port | Argyllshire | Benderloch | 56°28′32″N 5°33′14″W | | |
| Slughan | Argyllshire | Benderloch | 56°33′06″N 5°28′05″W | | |

== Garvellachs ==
=== Eileach an Naoimh ===
This small island of Eileach an Naoimh has no bays.

=== Garbh Eileach ===
The island of Garbh Eileach has the following bays:

| Name | County | Nearest Village | Coordinates | Image | Notes |
|---|---|---|---|---|---|
| Sloc a' Cheatharnaich | Argyllshire | | 56°14′33″N 5°45′12″W | | |

== Islay ==
=== Colonsay ===
| Name | County | Nearest Village | Coordinates | Image | Notes |
|---|---|---|---|---|---|
| Kiloran Bay | Argyllshire | Scalasaig | 56°06′29″N 6°11′13″W | | |
| Port Araraibhne | Argyllshire | Scalasaig | 56°06′40″N 6°08′35″W | | |
| Port a' Bhuailtein | Argyllshire | Scalasaig | 56°06′04″N 6°09′04″W | | |
| Port a' Chapuill | Argyllshire | Scalasaig | 56°01′54″N 6°12′09″W | | |
| Port an Obain | Argyllshire | Scalasaig | 56°04′08″N 6°11′08″W | | |
| Port an Tighe Mhòir | Argyllshire | Scalasaig | 56°06′27″N 6°11′39″W | | |
| Port Ceann a' Ghàrraidh | Argyllshire | Scalasaig | 56°06′17″N 6°08′53″W | | |
| Port na Cuilce | Argyllshire | Scalasaig | 56°07′42″N 6°09′53″W | | |
| Port Mòr | Argyllshire | Scalasaig | 56°04′20″N 6°14′44″W | | |
| Port a' Mhuilinn | Argyllshire | Scalasaig | 56°05′06″N 6°09′50″W | cwenter | |
| Port an Obain | Argyllshire | Scalasaig | 56°07′17″N 6°10′20″W | | |
| Port Olmsa | Argyllshire | Scalasaig | 56°05′12″N 6°09′43″W | | |
| Port Sgibinis | Argyllshire | Scalasaig | 56°06′53″N 6°10′52″W | | |

=== Danna ===
A tidal island with no bays.

=== Gigha ===
The island of Gigha has the following bays:

| Name | County | Nearest Village | Coordinates | Image | Notes |
|---|---|---|---|---|---|
| Ardminish Bay | Argyllshire | Ardminish | 55°40′31″N 5°43′49″W | | |
| Bàgh Rubha Ruaidh | Argyllshire | Ardminish | 55°43′07″N 5°44′16″W | | |
| Bàgh Rubha an Stearnail | Argyllshire | Ardminish | 55°42′04″N 5°43′31″W | | |
| Camas Nàireach | Argyllshire | Ardminish | 55°42′28″N 5°44′21″W | | |
| Camas nam Buth | Argyllshire | Ardminish | 55°42′30″N 5°44′36″W | | |
| Port a' Gharaidh | Argyllshire | Ardminish | 55°39′44″N 5°45′50″W | | |
| Port an Sgiathain | Argyllshire | Ardminish | 55°39′51″N 5°43′50″W | | |
| Port nan Each | Argyllshire | Ardminish | 55°40′06″N 5°45′51″W | | |
| Port nam Faochag | Argyllshire | Ardminish | 55°40′55″N 5°43′26″W | | |
| East Tarbert Bay | Argyllshire | Ardminish | 55°42′26″N 5°43′22″W | | |
| Port Bàn | Argyllshire | Ardminish | 55°42′14″N 5°44′55″W | | |
| Port Cùil | Argyllshire | Ardminish | 55°38′48″N 5°45′50″W | | |
| Port Mòr | Argyllshire | Ardminish | 55°38′45″N 5°45′47″W | | |
| Port Mòr | Argyllshire | Ardminish | 55°41′31″N 5°43′45″W | | |
| West Tarbert Bay | Argyllshire | Ardminish | 55°42′47″N 5°44′24″W | | |

==== Cara Island ====
| Name | County | Nearest Village | Coordinates | Image | Notes |
|---|---|---|---|---|---|
| Port na Seralaic | Argyllshire | | 55°38′04″N 5°45′18″W | | |

=== Islay ===
| Name | County | Nearest Village | Coordinates | Image | Notes |
|---|---|---|---|---|---|
| Alt an Daimh | Argyllshire | Port Ellen | 55°34′49″N 6°17′11″W | | |
| Alt Tràighe Leacail | Argyllshire | Port Ellen | 55°37′16″N 6°19′42″W | | |
| Aonan Luachrach | Argyllshire | Ardberg | 55°44′03″N 6°02′46″W | | |
| Aonan Mòr | Argyllshire | | 55°43′52″N 6°02′28″W | | |
| Ardilistry Bay | Argyllshire | Ardberg | 55°39′41″N 6°04′13″W | | |
| Aros Bay | Argyllshire | Ardberg | 55°42′05″N 6°01′53″W | | |
| Bàgh an Dà Dhoruis | Argyllshire | Bunnahabhain | 55°56′05″N 6°08′38″W | | |
| Bunnahabhainn Bay | Argyllshire | Bunnahabhain | 55°53′03″N 6°07′34″W | | |
| Claggain Bay | Argyllshire | Ardberg | 55°42′32″N 6°02′03″W | | |
| Kilchiaran Bay | Argyllshire | Port Charlotte | 55°45′08″N 6°28′05″W | | |
| Kilnaughton Bay | Argyllshire | Port Ellen | 55°37′41″N 6°12′57″W | | |
| Lagavulin Bay | Argyllshire | Ardberg | 55°38′02″N 6°07′38″W | | |
| Laggan Bay | Argyllshire | Port Ellen | 55°40′51″N 6°17′52″W | | |
| Lossit Bay | Argyllshire | Portnahaven | 55°42′42″N 6°29′46″W | | |
| Machir Bay | Argyllshire | Portnahaven | 55°45′42″N 6°28′07″W | | |
| Port a' Bhàta | Argyllshire | Port Charlotte | 55°45′12″N 6°28′01″W | | |
| Port an Ladhair | Argyllshire | Portnahaven | 55°41′09″N 6°27′28″W | | |
| Port an t'Sruthain | Argyllshire | Port Charlotte | 55°44′04″N 6°22′57″W | | |
| Port Alsaig | Argyllshire | Port Ellen | 55°39′03″N 6°16′33″W | | |
| Port Asabuis | Argyllshire | Port Ellen | 55°35′20″N 6°15′30″W | | |
| Port Bàn | Argyllshire | Bridgend | 55°45′16″N 6°22′07″W | | |
| Port Bàn | Argyllshire | | 55°39′02″N 6°16′18″W | | |
| Port Caol | Argyllshire | | 55°41′27″N 6°26′40″W | | |
| Port Ellister | Argyllshire | | 55°40′48″N 6°28′15″W | | |
| Port Flora | Argyllshire | | 55°45′22″N 6°22′06″W | | |
| Port Fròige | Argyllshire | | 55°42′24″N 6°30′07″W | | |
| Port Gleann na Gaoidh | Argyllshire | | 55°41′40″N 6°26′10″W | | |
| Port Mòr | Argyllshire | | 55°43′12″N 6°20′18″W | | |
| Port Mòr | Argyllshire | | 55°41′01″N 6°01′41″W | | |
| Port Mòr | Argyllshire | | 55°44′53″N 6°28′41″W | | |
| Port Mòr na Carraig | Argyllshire | | 55°42′36″N 6°24′40″W | | |
| Port nan Eilean Dubha | Argyllshire | | 55°39′02″N 6°17′34″W | | |
| Port nam Beindag | Argyllshire | | 55°53′25″N 6°19′25″W | | |
| Port Bun Aibhne | Argyllshire | | 55°49′35″N 6°27′41″W | | |
| Proaig Bay | Argyllshire | | 55°44′36″N 6°03′00″W | | |
| Saligo Bay | Argyllshire | | 55°48′40″N 6°27′46″W | | |
| Sanaigmore Bay | Argyllshire | | 55°51′13″N 6°24′53″W | | |
| Slugaide Glas | Argyllshire | | 55°38′07″N 6°19′05″W | | |

=== Jura ===
| Name | County | Nearest Village | Coordinates | Image | Notes |
|---|---|---|---|---|---|
| Ardlussa Bay | Argyllshire | | 56°01′44″N 5°46′01″W | | |
| Bàgh Gleann nam Muc | Argyllshire | | 56°08′32″N 5°43′29″W | | |
| Bàgh Fèith a' Chaorainn | Argyllshire | | 56°07′08″N 5°46′23″W | | |
| Bàgh Gleann Righ Mòr | Argyllshire | | 55°58′11″N 5°58′31″W | | |
| Bàgh Gleann Speireig | Argyllshire | | 56°06′21″N 5°48′28″W | | |
| Bàgh Uamh nan Giall | Argyllshire | | 56°07′28″N 5°45′27″W | | |
| Bay of Small Isles | Argyllshire | | 55°51′36″N 5°55′46″W | | |
| Brein Phort | Argyllshire | | 55°58′56″N 6°00′01″W | | |
| Brein Phort | Argyllshire | | 55°55′27″N 6°03′45″W | | |
| Camas a' Bhuailte | Argyllshire | | 56°02′49″N 5°45′14″W | | |
| Camas nam Meanbh-chuileag | Argyllshire | | 56°02′32″N 5°45′20″W | | |
| Corpach Bay | Argyllshire | | 56°03′27″N 5°54′29″W | | |
| Dubh Chamas | Argyllshire | | 56°06′26″N 5°41′41″W | | |
| Glenbatrick Bay | Argyllshire | | 55°57′02″N 5°58′46″W | | |
| Glendebadel Bay | Argyllshire | | 56°05′32″N 5°49′47″W | | |
| Glengarrisdale Bay | Argyllshire | | 56°06′49″N 5°47′15″W | | |
| Glentrosdale Bay | Argyllshire | | 56°08′21″N 5°44′27″W | | |
| Lagg Bay | Argyllshire | | 55°56′26″N 5°50′41″W | | |
| Loch na Mile | Argyllshire | | 55°51′59″N 5°55′20″W | | |
| Lowlandman's Bay | Argyllshire | | 55°53′05″N 5°53′28″W | | |
| Lussa Bay | Argyllshire | | 56°00′50″N 5°47′09″W | | |
| McDougall's Bay | Argyllshire | | 55°50′20″N 6°05′16″W | | |
| Òb an Rubha Bhuide | Argyllshire | | 55°53′10″N 5°53′57″W | | |
| Port a' Ghàrraidh Leacaich | Argyllshire | | 55°52′45″N 5°53′52″W | | |
| Port an Aoinidh Uir | Argyllshire | | 55°54′07″N 5°52′31″W | | |
| Port an Tiobairt | Argyllshire | | 56°07′50″N 5°41′23″W | | Known as Kinuachdrach Bay. |
| Port Doir' a' Chrorain | Argyllshire | | 55°55′01″N 5°52′00″W | | |
| Port Lag Losguinn | Argyllshire | | 56°03′55″N 5°53′45″W | | |
| Port nan Laogh | Argyllshire | | 56°03′53″N 5°44′16″W | | |
| Port nam Furm | Argyllshire | | 56°08′44″N 5°41′57″W | | |
| Port nam Meirleach | Argyllshire | | 56°01′29″N 5°46′11″W | | |
| Port Mòr | Argyllshire | | 55°48′32″N 5°57′17″W | | |
| Port Uamh nan Achlais | Argyllshire | | 56°03′33″N 5°54′16″W | | |
| Shian Bay | Argyllshire | | 56°01′04″N 5°58′15″W | | |
| Tarbert Bay | Argyllshire | | 55°58′10″N 5°50′00″W | | |
| Tramiag Bay | Argyllshire | | 56°02′05″N 5°45′44″W | | |
| Whitefarland Bay | Argyllshire | | 55°51′51″N 6°05′18″W | | |

=== Oronsay ===
| Name | County | Nearest Village | Coordinates | Image | Notes |
|---|---|---|---|---|---|
| Port na h-Atha | Argyllshire | | 56°00′51″N 6°13′52″W | | |

=== Scarba ===
| Name | County | Nearest Village | Coordinates | Image | Notes |
|---|---|---|---|---|---|
| Bàgh Aoineadh na h-Uamha | Argyllshire | | 56°11′37″N 5°42′46″W | | |
| Bàgh Creagan nan Deargann | Argyllshire | | 56°09′46″N 5°41′37″W | | |
| Bàgh Gleann a' Mhaoil | Argyllshire | | 56°09′59″N 5°41′02″W | | |
| Camas nam Bàirneach | Argyllshire | | 56°09′35″N 5°43′35″W | | |
| Port an Eag-uillt | Argyllshire | | 56°11′11″N 5°40′45″W | | |

=== Texa ===
| Name | County | Nearest Village | Coordinates | Image | Notes |
|---|---|---|---|---|---|
| Port a' Bhuidei | Argyllshire | | 55°37′04″N 6°08′06″W | | |
| Port an t-Sruthain | Argyllshire | | 55°36′59″N 6°08′26″W | | |
| Port Bàn | Argyllshire | | 55°36′55″N 6°08′30″W | | |

== Knapdale ==
=== Eilean dà Mhèinn ===
A small inhabited island in Loch Crinan with no bays.

== Loch Craignish ==
=== Eilean Mhic Chrion ===
| Name | County | Nearest Village | Coordinates | Image | Notes |
|---|---|---|---|---|---|
| Bàgh Àird an t-Sàilein | Argyllshire | | 56°10′15″N 5°32′24″W | | |
| Bàgh Innvraig | Argyllshire | | 56°10′23″N 5°32′11″W | | |

=== Eilean Rìgh ===
The small island of Eilean Rìgh has no bays.

=== Eilean Trodday ===
The small island of Eilean Trodday has no bays.

== Loch Linnhe ==
=== Eriska ===
Erisa is a flat tidal island at the entrance to Loch Creran with no bays.

== Loch Moidart ==
=== Eilean Shona ===
| Name | County | Nearest Village | Coordinates | Image | Notes |
|---|---|---|---|---|---|
| Port an Sgrìodain | Argyllshire | | 56°48′17″N 5°52′43″W | | |

=== Eilean Tioram ===
A small tidal island on the south channel of Loch Moidart with no bays.

== Loch Sunnart ==
=== Càrna ===
There is no bays on Càrna.

=== Oldany ===
There is no bays on Oldany.

=== Oronsay ===
There is no bays on Oronsay.

== Mull ==
=== Calve Island ===
This island has no bays.

=== Coll ===
| Name | County | Nearest Village | Coordinates | Image | Notes |
|---|---|---|---|---|---|
| Bàgh Craimneach | Argyllshire | | 56°38′23″N 6°36′03″W | | |
| Bàgh an Trailleich | Argyllshire | | 56°39′35″N 6°33′39″W | | |
| Bàgh Fiaranuis | Argyllshire | | 56°37′15″N 6°37′27″W | | |
| Bàgh Feisdlum | Argyllshire | | 56°38′18″N 6°29′10″W | | |
| Bàgh na Coille | Argyllshire | | 56°40′28″N 6°27′16″W | | |
| Cliad Bay | Argyllshire | | 56°39′12″N 6°34′29″W | | |
| Cornaig Bay | Argyllshire | | 56°41′06″N 6°29′48″W | | |
| Crossapol Bay | Argyllshire | | 56°34′33″N 6°40′49″W | | |
| Feall Bay | Argyllshire | | 56°35′48″N 6°40′01″W | | |
| Friesland Bay | Argyllshire | | 56°35′10″N 6°35′00″W | | |
| Grishipoll Bay | Argyllshire | | 56°38′51″N 6°35′14″W | | |
| Hogh Bay | Argyllshire | | 56°37′48″N 6°37′04″W | | |
| Port Bàn | Argyllshire | | 56°34′07″N 6°40′56″W | | |
| Port Mìne | Argyllshire | | 56°35′42″N 6°40′56″W | | |
| Port na h-Eathar | Argyllshire | | 56°35′29″N 6°33′27″W | | |

=== Eorsa ===
The island of Eorsa has no bays.

=== Erraid ===
| Name | County | Nearest Village | Coordinates | Image | Notes |
|---|---|---|---|---|---|
| Port na Faoilinn Bàine | Argyllshire | | 56°17′43″N 6°22′41″W | | |

=== Gometra ===
| Name | County | Nearest Village | Coordinates | Image | Notes |
|---|---|---|---|---|---|
| Acairseid Mhòr | Argyllshire | Cleadale | 56°29′38″N 6°18′03″W | | |

=== Gunna ===
| Name | County | Nearest Village | Coordinates | Image | Notes |
|---|---|---|---|---|---|
| McNeil's Bay | Argyllshire | | 56°33′49″N 6°43′55″W | | |

=== Inch Kenneth ===
| Name | County | Nearest Village | Coordinates | Image | Notes |
|---|---|---|---|---|---|
| Bagh an Lollaich | Argyllshire | | 56°26′24″N 6°09′57″W | | |

=== Iona ===
| Name | County | Nearest Village | Coordinates | Image | Notes |
|---|---|---|---|---|---|
| Camas Cùil an t-Saimh | Argyllshire | Baile Mòr | 56°19′32″N 6°25′48″W | | |
| Port a' Ghoirtein Bhig | Argyllshire | Baile Mòr | 56°19′55″N 6°25′58″W | | |
| Port Bàn | Argyllshire | Baile Mòr | 56°19′56″N 6°25′54″W | | |
| Port nam Mairtir | Argyllshire | Baile Mòr | 56°19′45″N 6°23′34″W | | |
| St Ronan's Bay | Argyllshire | Baile Mòr | 56°19′52″N 6°23′22″W | | |

=== Little Colonsay ===
This small island has no bays.

=== Mull ===
| Name | County | Nearest Village | Coordinates | Image | Notes |
|---|---|---|---|---|---|
| Ardalanish Bay | Argyllshire | Bunessan | 56°17′05″N 6°14′30″W | | |
| Ardmore Bay | Argyllshire | Tobermory | 56°39′11″N 6°08′16″W | | |
| Ballygown Bay | Argyllshire | Ballygown | 56°30′32″N 6°10′42″W | | |
| Bàgh a' Chnoic Mhaoileanaich | Argyllshire | Fionnphort | 56°17′18″N 6°21′18″W | | |
| Bàgh an Iollaich | Argyllshire | Salen | 56°26′20″N 6°09′57″W | | |
| Bàgh Chill Fhinichin | Argyllshire | Fionnphort | 56°22′17″N 6°04′54″W | | |
| Bàgh Chrossapol | Argyllshire | Calgary | 56°36′20″N 6°16′11″W | | |
| BÀgh Inbhir h-Aibhne | Argyllshire | Fionnphort | 56°20′52″N 6°20′24″W | | |
| Bàgh Sgeir Lach | Argyllshire | Gruline | 56°28′39″N 6°09′02″W | | |
| Bàgh Tìr Chille | Argyllshire | Bunessan | 56°16′56″N 6°19′38″W | | |
| Bloody Bay | Argyllshire | Tobermory | 56°38′47″N 6°06′33″W | | |
| Calgary Bay | Argyllshire | Dervaig | 56°33′38″N 6°18′24″W | | |
| Camas an Lagain | Argyllshire | Ballygown | 56°29′58″N 6°09′12″W | | |
| Camas an t-Seilisteir | Argyllshire | Strathcoil | 56°23′32″N 5°44′51″W | | |
| Camas nan Caorach | Argyllshire | Croggan | 56°20′45″N 5°50′51″W | | |
| Camas nan Crann | Argyllshire | Lochbuie | 56°22′44″N 5°44′19″W | | |
| Camas Tuath | Argyllshire | Bunessan | 56°20′34″N 6°17′31″W | | |
| Carsaig Bay | Argyllshire | Carsaig | 56°19′13″N 5°58′46″W | | |
| Craignure Bay | Argyllshire | Craignure | 56°28′24″N 5°42′14″W | | |
| Duart Bay | Argyllshire | Craignure | 56°27′24″N 5°40′06″W | | |
| Fishnish Bay | Argyllshire | Aros | 56°30′50″N 5°50′04″W | | |
| Kilfinichen Bay | Argyllshire | Bunessan | 56°22′39″N 6°04′10″W | | |
| Laggan Bay | Argyllshire | Ballygown | 56°29′25″N 6°09′06″W | | |
| Laorin Bay | Argyllshire | Tobermory | 56°38′03″N 6°12′11″W | | |
| Lòn Reudle | Argyllshire | Ballygown | 56°31′36″N 6°17′57″W | | |
| Lord Lovat's Bay | Argyllshire | Lochbuie | 56°18′57″N 5°52′44″W | | |
| Port Ceann dà Aoineadh | Argyllshire | Lochbuie | 56°19′55″N 5°51′59″W | | |
| Port Bheathain | Argyllshire | Bunessan | 56°17′22″N 6°12′00″W | | |
| Port Burg | Argyllshire | Ballygown | 56°31′33″N 6°14′52″W | | |
| Port Langamull | Argyllshire | Dervaig | 56°36′14″N 6°16′31″W | | |
| Port a' Bheòil Mhòir | Argyllshire | Lochbuie | 56°21′05″N 5°53′14″W | | |
| Port a' Chaomhain | Argyllshire | Knockan | 56°20′36″N 6°08′06″W | | |
| Port a' Chlaidh | Argyllshire | Ballygown | 56°28′24″N 6°07′34″W | | |
| Port an aird Fhada | Argyllshire | Knochan | 56°20′45″N 6°07′32″W | | |
| Port an t-Sluic | Argyllshire | Tobermory | 56°30′59″N 5°48′52″W | | |
| Port an t-Sruthain | Argyllshire | | 56°31′33″N 6°14′44″W | | |
| Port an t-Slaoichain | Argyllshire | Bunessan | 56°17′24″N 6°12′11″W | | |
| Port an Tobire | Argyllshire | Salen | 56°31′59″N 5°57′50″W | | |
| Port Gart an Fhithrich | Argyllshire | Fionnphort | 56°20′38″N 6°19′03″W | | |
| Port Mòr | Argyllshire | Bunessan | 56°16′54″N 6°15′11″W | | |
| Port na Crìche | Argyllshire | Ballygown | 56°30′51″N 6°11′36″W | | |
| Port na Luing | Argyllshire | Fionnphort | 56°16′48″N 6°19′44″W | | |
| Port na Muice Duibhe | Argyllshire | Lochbuie | 56°21′13″N 5°43′36″W | | |
| Port na Saille | Argyllshire | Lochbuie | 56°23′12″N 5°41′58″W | | |
| Port nam Buitsichean | Argyllshire | Salen | 56°32′08″N 5°57′46″W | | |
| Port nan Crullach | Argyllshire | Lochbuie | 56°22′29″N 5°41′32″W | | |
| Port Ohirnie | Argyllshire | Lochbuie | 56°18′55″N 5°49′36″W | | |
| Port of Oskamull | Argyllshire | Ballygown | 56°28′49″N 6°08′12″W | | |
| Port Rubha a' Bharra Ghainmheachain | Argyllshire | Lochbuie | 56°20′24″N 5°51′40″W | | |
| Port Uisken | Argyllshire | Bunessan | 56°17′15″N 6°12′51″W | | |
| Salen Bay | Argyllshire | Salen | 56°31′22″N 5°56′57″W | | |
| Scallastle Bay | Argyllshire | | 56°29′28″N 5°44′42″W | | |
| Slochd Bay | Argyllshire | | 56°21′57″N 6°07′27″W | | |
| Sloc nan Con | Argyllshire | Balnahard | 56°24′41″N 6°09′21″W | | |
| Slugan Dubh | Argyllshire | Fionnphort | 56°18′16″N 6°22′08″W | | |
| Tobermory Bay | Argyllshire | Tobermory | 56°37′14″N 6°03′45″W | | |
| Tràigh a' Mhill | Argyllshire | Fionnphort | 56°16′55″N 6°20′39″W | | |

=== Staffa ===
The small island of Staffa has no bays.

=== Shuna ===
This island of Shuna has no bays.

=== Tiree ===
| Name | County | Nearest Village | Coordinates | Image | Notes |
|---|---|---|---|---|---|
| Balephetrish Bay | Argyllshire | Scarinish | 56°31′21″N 6°52′39″W | | |
| Balephuil Bay | Argyllshire | Scarinish | 56°27′09″N 6°57′20″W | | |
| Gott Bay | Argyllshire | Scarinish | 56°28′15″N 6°51′41″W | | |
| Hough Bay | Argyllshire | Scarinish | 56°30′40″N 6°59′09″W | | |
| Hynish Bay | Argyllshire | Scarinish | 56°28′15″N 6°51′42″W | | |
| Port a' Mhuilinn | Argyllshire | Scarinish | 56°30′12″N 6°47′58″W | | |
| Port na Banaich | Argyllshire | Scarinish | 56°30′05″N 6°48′06″W | | |
| Port nan Caorach | Argyllshire | Scarinish | 56°30′37″N 6°48′07″W | | |
| Port Bàn | Argyllshire | Scarinish | 56°31′48″N 6°51′35″W | | |
| Port Bharrapol | Argyllshire | Scarinish | 56°27′53″N 6°58′31″W | | |
| Port Chunn Nèill | Argyllshire | Scarinish | 56°33′11″N 6°44′59″W | | |
| Port Fada | Argyllshire | Scarinish | 56°31′37″N 6°54′01″W | | |
| Port Mòr (North Tiree) | Argyllshire | Scarinish | 56°29′15″N 6°50′40″W | | |
| Port Mòr | Argyllshire | Scarinish | 56°27′08″N 6°56′26″W | | |
| Port Ruadh | Argyllshire | Scarinish | 56°32′38″N 6°44′31″W | | |
| Port Snoig | Argyllshire | Scarinish | 56°26′30″N 6°55′12″W | | |
| Salum Bay | Argyllshire | Scarinish | 56°32′29″N 6°47′18″W | | |
| Sorobaidh Bay | Argyllshire | Scarinish | 56°28′27″N 6°53′18″W | | |
| Vaul Bay | Argyllshire | Scarinish | 56°32′26″N 6°47′51″W | | |

=== Ulva ===
| Name | County | Nearest Village | Coordinates | Image | Notes |
|---|---|---|---|---|---|
| Bàgh Sgeir Lach | Argyllshire | | 56°28′39″N 6°09′02″W | | |
| Lòn Bhearnuis | Argyllshire | | 56°29′50″N 6°14′08″W | | |
| Port Bàta na Luinge | Argyllshire | | 56°29′36″N 6°12′07″W | | |
| Port Garbh | Argyllshire | | 56°29′13″N 6°10′33″W | | |
| Port na Gulaidh | Argyllshire | | 56°29′15″N 6°11′22″W | | |
| Port nan Lighura | Argyllshire | | 56°30′01″N 6°13′27″W | | |
| Soriby Bay | Argyllshire | | 56°29′09″N 6°10′58″W | | |

=== Treshnish Isles ===
==== Lunga ====
This small island of Lunga has no bays.

== North Highland ==
=== Eilean an Ròin Mòr ===
The small island of Eilean an Ròin Mòr and the much smaller island next to it, Eilean an Ròin Beag has no bays.

=== Eilean Horrisdale ===
| Name | County | Nearest Village | Coordinates | Image | Notes |
|---|---|---|---|---|---|
| Camas a' Channuinn | Ross and Cromarty | | 57°42′29″N 5°43′08″W | | |
| Camas Ruadh | Ross and Cromarty | | 57°42′27″N 5°42′45″W | | |

=== Gruinard ===
This island has no bays.

=== Handa ===
This island has no bays.

=== Isle of Ewe ===
| Name | County | Nearest Village | Coordinates | Image | Notes |
|---|---|---|---|---|---|
| Acairseid Mhòr | Ross and Cromarty | | 57°50′34″N 5°37′57″W | | |
| Camas Beithe | Ross and Cromarty | | 57°50′25″N 5°37′33″W | | |
| Uamhag na Creige-streap | Ross and Cromarty | | 57°50′41″N 5°38′23″W | | |
| Uamhag nan Gobhar | Ross and Cromarty | | 57°50′49″N 5°38′11″W | | |

=== Longa Island ===
| Name | County | Nearest Village | Coordinates | Image | Notes |
|---|---|---|---|---|---|
| Camas na Rainich | Ross and Cromarty | | 57°44′04″N 5°48′47″W | | |
| Camas nam Faochag | Ross and Cromarty | | 57°44′11″N 5°49′10″W | | |

== Sound of Arisaig ==
=== Eilean an Ròin Mòr ===
The small island of Eilean an Ròin Mòr has no bays.

=== Eilean Ighe ===
The small island of Eilean Ighe has no bays.

== Skye ==
=== Eilean Bàn ===
The small island of Eilean Bàn between Kyle of Lochalsh and the Isle of Skye and has no bays.

=== Eilean Orasaigh ===
The small island of Eilean Orasaigh has no bays.

=== Eilean Tigh ===
The small island of Eilean Tigh has no bays.

=== Harlosh ===
The small island of Harlosh has no bays.

=== Isay ===
The small island of Isay in Loch Dunvegan has no bays.

=== Longay ===
The small island of Longay has no bays.

=== Ornsay ===
The small island of Ornsay of the south-east coast of Skye has no bays.

=== Pabay ===
The small island of Pabay, off the southeast coast of Skye has no bays.

=== Raasay ===
| Name | County | Nearest Village | Coordinates | Image | Notes |
|---|---|---|---|---|---|
| Bàgh an Inbhire | Inverness-shire | | 57°24′22″N 6°04′53″W | | |
| Churchton Bay | Inverness-shire | | 57°20′58″N 6°04′56″W | | |
| Holoman Bay | Inverness-shire | | 57°22′17″N 6°04′56″W | | |

=== Rona ===
| Name | County | Nearest Village | Coordinates | Image | Notes |
|---|---|---|---|---|---|
| Acairseid Thioram | Inverness-shire | | 57°32′46″N 5°58′59″W | | |
| Ob an Dreallaire | Inverness-shire | | 57°34′25″N 5°58′41″W | | |
| Ob nam Feusgan | Inverness-shire | | 57°34′03″N 5°59′11″W | | |
| Port an Fhearainn | Inverness-shire | | 57°33′52″N 5°59′10″W | | |
| Port an Teampuill | Inverness-shire | | 57°30′57″N 5°59′01″W | | |

=== Scalpay, Inner Hebrides ===
| Name | County | Nearest Village | Coordinates | Image | Notes |
|---|---|---|---|---|---|
| Camas na Geadaig | Inverness-shire | | 57°19′17″N 6°00′28″W | | |
| Camas na Fisteodh | Inverness-shire | | 57°17′16″N 5°55′31″W | | |

=== Skye ===
| Name | County | Nearest Village | Coordinates | Image | Notes |
|---|---|---|---|---|---|
| Am Bagh-dhùin | Inverness-shire | Eyre | 57°31′49″N 6°22′35″W | | |
| Ardmore Bay | Inverness-shire | Halistra | 57°32′37″N 6°38′53″W | | |
| Armadale Bay | Inverness-shire | Armadale | 57°04′00″N 5°53′38″W | | |
| Aros Bay | Inverness-shire | Geary | 57°32′56″N 6°33′51″W | | |
| Bàgh a' Chnuic | Inverness-shire | Teangue | 57°06′26″N 5°50′49″W | | |
| Bàgh a' Mhuilinn | Inverness-shire | Teangue | 57°04′45″N 5°53′09″W | | |
| Bàgh Dùnan Ruadh | Inverness-shire | Kylerhea | 57°13′02″N 5°40′01″W | | |
| Bàgh na Dubh-Àirde | Inverness-shire | Tarskavaig | 57°09′27″N 5°55′41″W | | |
| Bàgh Tharsgabhaig | Inverness-shire | Tarskavaig | 57°06′33″N 5°59′48″W | | |
| Balmeanach Bay | Inverness-shire | Ollach | 57°20′24″N 6°05′42″W | | |
| Bearreraig Bay | Inverness-shire | Ellishadder | 57°30′00″N 6°08′43″W | | |
| Brandarsaig Bay | Inverness-shire | Struan | 57°21′31″N 6°33′52″W | | |
| Broadford Bay | Inverness-shire | Broadford | 57°14′45″N 5°53′29″W | | |
| Camalaig Bay | Inverness-shire | Dunvegan | 57°27′45″N 6°37′06″W | | |
| Camas a' Mhòr-bheòil | Inverness-shire | Gedintailor | 57°20′33″N 6°06′32″W | | |
| Camas a' Mhùrain | Inverness-shire | Carbost | 57°09′56″N 6°18′59″W | | |
| Camas Bàn | Inverness-shire | Harlosh | 57°22′48″N 6°31′20″W | | |
| Camas Bàn | Inverness-shire | | 57°29′40″N 6°38′12″W | | |
| Camas Bàn | Inverness-shire | | 57°24′14″N 6°10′22″W | | |
| Camas Bàn | Inverness-shire | | 57°25′34″N 6°46′42″W | | |
| Camas Barabhaig | Inverness-shire | Camuscross | 57°07′06″N 5°48′38″W | | |
| Camas Beag | Inverness-shire | Earlish | 57°34′01″N 6°23′06″W | | |
| Camas Croise | Inverness-shire | Isleornsay | 57°08′05″N 5°48′03″W | | |
| Camas Fhionnairigh | Inverness-shire | Broadford | 57°11′11″N 6°07′04″W | | |
| Camas Lagan | Inverness-shire | Edinbane | 57°31′03″N 6°26′05″W | | |
| Camas na h-Annait | Inverness-shire | Milovaig | 57°25′34″N 6°46′42″W | | |
| Camas na h-Uamha | Inverness-shire | Dunvegan | 57°20′31″N 6°33′49″W | | |
| Camas na Sgianadin | Inverness-shire | Broadford | 57°15′45″N 5°56′29″W | | |
| Camas Malag | Inverness-shire | Torrin | 57°11′54″N 6°00′17″W | | |
| Camas nan Sìdhean | Inverness-shire | Milovaig | 57°25′36″N 6°45′58″W | | |
| Camas nam Mult | Inverness-shire | Isleornsay | 57°09′26″N 5°47′54″W | | |
| Fiskavaig Bay | Inverness-shire | Fiskavaig | 57°19′38″N 6°26′00″W | | |
| Gesto Bay | Inverness-shire | Struan | 57°20′36″N 6°24′04″W | | |
| Kilmaluag Bay | Inverness-shire | Kilmaluag | 57°41′43″N 6°17′42″W | | |
| Inbhir a' Ghàrraidh | Inverness-shire | Dunvegan | 57°20′04″N 6°35′18″W | | |
| Inver Tote | Inverness-shire | Staffin | 57°33′59″N 6°08′48″W | | |
| Leinish Bay | Inverness-shire | Colbost | 57°27′45″N 6°40′00″W | | |
| Loch Bay | Inverness-shire | Stein | 57°31′22″N 6°36′20″W | | |
| Lovaig Bay | Inverness-shire | Dunvegan | 57°30′15″N 6°37′24″W | | |
| Lorgill Bay | Inverness-shire | Milovaig | 57°22′11″N 6°42′19″W | | |
| Lùb an Sgòir | Inverness-shire | Kilvaxter | 57°40′38″N 6°22′34″W | | |
| Lùb Stac nam Meann | Inverness-shire | Kilmaluag | 57°42′26″N 6°18′10″W | | |
| Lùib na Moil | Inverness-shire | Sconser | 57°17′58″N 6°02′51″W | | |
| Moonen Bay | Inverness-shire | Glendale | 57°25′01″N 6°45′49″W | | |
| Oisgill Bay | Inverness-shire | Glendale | 57°26′46″N 6°47′01″W | | |
| Ob Apoldoire | Inverness-shire | Glendale | 57°16′14″N 5°58′42″W | | |
| Ob Dubh | Inverness-shire | Dunvegan | 57°26′25″N 6°36′52″W | | |
| Ob nan Ron | Inverness-shire | Staffin | 57°38′08″N 6°11′57″W | | |
| Òb Snaoiseaig | Inverness-shire | Isleornsay | 57°07′34″N 5°48′07″W | | |
| Ob Apoldoire | Inverness-shire | Broadford | 57°16′14″N 5°58′42″W | | |
| Òb Ghabhsgabhaig | Inverness-shire | Tarskavaig | 57°08′00″N 5°58′37″W | | |
| Poll na h-Ealaidh | Inverness-shire | Uig | 57°32′48″N 6°23′07″W | | |
| Port an Luig Mhòir | Inverness-shire | Elgol | 57°08′05″N 6°06′01″W | | |
| Port Aslaig | Inverness-shire | Broadford | 57°11′50″N 5°41′35″W | | |
| Port na Long | Inverness-shire | Aird | 57°01′42″N 5°58′04″W | | |
| Port Beag | Inverness-shire | Struan | 57°20′46″N 6°26′34″W | | |
| Port na Cullaidh | Inverness-shire | Elgol | 57°08′48″N 6°06′45″W | | |
| Port Duntulm | Inverness-shire | Kilmaluag | 57°41′09″N 6°20′47″W | | |
| Port Gobhlaig | Inverness-shire | Kilmaluag | 57°41′33″N 6°18′06″W | | |
| Ramasaig Bay | Inverness-shire | Glendale | 57°23′44″N 6°43′52″W | | |
| Staffin Bay | Inverness-shire | Brogaig | 57°38′25″N 6°13′16″W | | |
| Talisker Bay | Inverness-shire | Carbost | 57°17′02″N 6°28′09″W | | |
| Tianavaig Bay | Inverness-shire | Camastianavaig | 57°22′12″N 6°08′25″W | | |
| Tràigh Bhàn | Inverness-shire | Carbost | 57°17′02″N 6°28′09″W | | |
| Tulm Bay | Inverness-shire | Balmaqueen | 57°41′31″N 6°20′59″W | | |
| Uig Bay | Inverness-shire] | Idrigill | 57°34′36″N 6°22′59″W | | |
| Uig Bay | Inverness-shire | Glendale | 57°28′31″N 6°40′36″W | | |

=== Soay, Inner Hebrides ===
| Name | County | Nearest Village | Coordinates | Image | Notes |
|---|---|---|---|---|---|
| Camas nan Gall | Inverness-shire | | 57°08′49″N 6°12′22″W | | |

=== Wiay ===
| Name | County | Nearest Village | Coordinates | Image | Notes |
|---|---|---|---|---|---|
| Camas na Cille | Inverness-shire | | 57°20′24″N 6°30′25″W | | |

=== Cowlin Islands ===
==== Eilean Meadhanach ====
| Name | County | Nearest Village | Coordinates | Image | Notes |
|---|---|---|---|---|---|
| Camas na h-Annait | Ross and Cromarty | | 57°20′42″N 5°49′38″W | | |

== Slate Islands ==
=== Easdale ===
| Name | County | Nearest Village | Coordinates | Image | Notes |
|---|---|---|---|---|---|
| Camas Mòr | Argyllshire | | 56°17′20″N 5°39′21″W | | |

=== Insh ===
The small island of Insh has no bays.

=== Luing ===
| Name | County | Nearest Village | Coordinates | Image | Notes |
|---|---|---|---|---|---|
| Ardinamir Bay | Argyllshire | | 56°14′56″N 5°37′16″W | | |
| Bàgh Lachlainn | Argyllshire | | 56°14′43″N 5°37′03″W | | |
| Bàgh na h-Àird | Argyllshire | | 56°11′29″N 5°37′50″W | | |
| Black Mill Bay | Argyllshire | | 56°12′49″N 5°39′28″W | | |
| Camas nan Gall | Argyllshire | | 56°12′28″N 5°39′10″W | | |
| Port Mary | Argyllshire | | 56°16′02″N 5°38′38″W | | |

=== Lunga ===
| Name | County | Nearest Village | Coordinates | Image | Notes |
|---|---|---|---|---|---|
| Camas a' Mhòr-Fhir | Argyllshire | | 56°12′39″N 5°42′18″W | | |

=== Seil ===
The island of Seil has the following bays:

| Name | County | Nearest Village | Coordinates | Image | Notes |
|---|---|---|---|---|---|
| Balvicar Bay | Argyllshire | | 56°17′36″N 5°36′07″W | | |
| Port Mòr | Argyllshire | | 56°16′35″N 5°36′27″W | | |

=== Shuna ===
The island of Shuna has the following bays:

| Name | County | Nearest Village | Coordinates | Image | Notes |
|---|---|---|---|---|---|
| Port na Crò | Argyllshire | | 56°13′29″N 5°36′45″W | | |
| Poll na Gile | Argyllshire | | 56°12′38″N 5°35′29″W | | |

=== Torsa ===
A small island of Torsa off the north coast of Luing has no bays.

== Small Isles ==
=== Canna ===
The island of Canna has the following bays:

| Name | County | Nearest Village | Coordinates | Image | Notes |
|---|---|---|---|---|---|
| An Doirlinn | Inverness-shire | | 57°03′12″N 6°30′42″W | | |
| Camas Thairbearnais | Inverness-shire | | 57°04′09″N 6°33′31″W | | |
| Tarbert Bay | Inverness-shire | | 57°03′18″N 6°32′42″W | | |

=== Eigg ===
The island of Eigg has the following bays:

| Name | County | Nearest Village | Coordinates | Image | Notes |
|---|---|---|---|---|---|
| Bay of Laig | Inverness-shire | Galmisdale | 56°55′27″N 6°09′45″W | | |
| Camas Sgiotaig | Inverness-shire | Galmisdale | 56°55′48″N 6°09′50″W | | |
| Poll nam Partan | Inverness-shire | Galmisdale | 56°53′07″N 6°07′25″W | | |

=== Muck ===
The island of Muck has the following bays:

| Name | County | Nearest Village | Coordinates | Image | Notes |
|---|---|---|---|---|---|
| Bàgh a' Ghallanaich | Inverness-shire | | 56°50′41″N 6°15′23″W | | |
| Camas na Cairidh | Inverness-shire | | 56°50′39″N 6°14′39″W | | |
| Camas Mòr | Inverness-shire | | 56°49′44″N 6°14′59″W | | |
| Sloc na Dubhaich | Inverness-shire | | 56°49′32″N 6°14′17″W | | |

=== Rùm ===
The island of Rùm has the following bays:

| Name | County | Nearest Village | Coordinates | Image | Notes |
|---|---|---|---|---|---|
| Camas na h-Àtha | Inverness-shire | Kinloch | 57°00′40″N 6°26′53″W | | |
| Camas Pliasgaig | Inverness-shire | Kinloch | 57°02′38″N 6°17′03″W | | |
| Bàgh na h-Uamha | Inverness-shire | Kinloch | 56°59′37″N 6°14′46″W | | |
| Guirdil Bay | Inverness-shire | Kinloch | 57°01′37″N 6°25′10″W | | |
| Kilmory Bay | Inverness-shire | Kinloch | 57°03′14″N 6°21′02″W | | |
| Wreck Bay | Inverness-shire | Kinloch | 56°59′41″N 6°26′00″W | | |

=== Sanday ===
The island of Sanday has the following bays:

| Name | County | Nearest Village | Coordinates | Image | Notes |
|---|---|---|---|---|---|
| Camas an Ail | Inverness-shire | | 57°03′15″N 6°29′39″W | | |
| Camas Stianabhaig | Inverness-shire | | 57°02′58″N 6°28′39″W | | |
| Sùileabhaig | Inverness-shire | | 57°02′48″N 6°29′23″W | | |

== Summer Isles ==
=== Horse Island ===
The island of Horse has the following bays:

| Name | County | Nearest Village | Coordinates | Image | Notes |
|---|---|---|---|---|---|
| Achlais Sgùrr nan Uan | Ross and Cromarty | | 57°59′09″N 5°20′16″W | | |

=== Island Macaskin ===
This small island of Island Macaskin has no bays.

=== Isle Martin ===
The island of Isle Martin has the following bays:

| Name | County | Nearest Village | Coordinates | Image | Notes |
|---|---|---|---|---|---|
| Camas a' Bhuailidh | Ross and Cromarty | | 57°56′21″N 5°13′33″W | | |
| Null Dorch | Ross and Cromarty | | 57°56′55″N 5°13′04″W | | |

=== Isle Ristol ===
| Name | County | Nearest Village | Coordinates | Image | Notes |
|---|---|---|---|---|---|
| Camas a' Bhuailte | Ross and Cromarty | | 58°02′30″N 5°27′01″W | | |

=== Priest Island ===
| Name | County | Nearest Village | Coordinates | Image | Notes |
|---|---|---|---|---|---|
| Acairseid Eilean a' Chlèirich | Ross and Cromarty | | 57°57′40″N 5°30′13″W | | |
| Cobble Bay | Ross and Cromarty | | 57°57′36″N 5°29′52″W | | |

=== Tanera Beag ===
| Name | County | Nearest Village | Coordinates | Image | Notes |
|---|---|---|---|---|---|
| Acairseid a' Chuain | Ross and Cromarty | | 58°00′53″N 5°26′58″W | | |
| Acairseid Mhòr | Ross and Cromarty | | 58°00′46″N 5°26′32″W | | |

=== Tanera Mòr ===
| Name | County | Nearest Village | Coordinates | Image | Notes |
|---|---|---|---|---|---|
| The Anchorage | Ross and Cromarty | | 58°00′47″N 5°23′58″W | | |

== See also ==
- List of bays of the Firth of Clyde
- List of bays of Scotland
- List of bays of the Outer Hebrides
- List of bays of the Shetland Islands
- List of bays of the Orkney Islands
