= List of bays of the Orkney Islands =

This List of bays of the Orkney Islands summarises the bays that are located in the islands of Orkney in Scotland.

The heading "Nearest Town" shows the nearest substantial settlement, as Kirkwall is the only town in the Orkney islands.

== Auskerry ==
The small island of Auskerry has no bays.

== Brough of Birsay ==
The tidal island of Brough of Birsay has no bays.

== Burray ==
Name	Nearest Town	Coordinates	image	Notes
Echnaloch Bay	Burray village	58°51′39″N 2°55′30″W		
Weddell Bay	Burray village	58°52′12″N 2°54′34″W		

== Calf of Eday ==
Name	Nearest Town	Coordinates	image	Notes
Pernealy Bay		59°14′32″N 2°43′47″W		

== Calf of Flotta ==
The small island of Calf of Flotta has no bays.

== Cava ==
The small island of Cava has no bays.

== Copinsay ==
Name	Nearest Town	Coordinates	image	Notes
South Bay		58°53′51″N 2°41′11″W		
North Bay		58°54′09″N 2°41′07″W		
Bight of Hamnavo		58°54′06″N 2°42′15″W		

== Damsay ==
The small island in the Bay of Firth in Mainland has no bays.

== Eday ==
Name	Nearest Town	Coordinates	image	Notes
Bay of Backaland	Calfsound	59°09′31″N 2°45′00″W		
Bay of Carrick	Calfsound	59°13′51″N 2°45′04″W		
Bay of Doomy	Calfsound	59°11′44″N 2°46′48″W		
Bay of Greentoft	Calfsound	59°08′34″N 2°46′17″W		
Bay of Icevay	Calfsound	59°11′13″N 2°45′31″W		
Bay of London	Calfsound	59°11′30″N 2°45′28″W		
Bay of Newark	Calfsound	59°12′28″N 2°46′48″W		
Bight of Milldale	Calfsound	59°12′04″N 2°45′00″W		
Cusbay	Calfsound	59°13′35″N 2°47′10″W		
Fersness Bay	Calfsound	59°11′48″N 2°47′59″W		
Mill Bay	Calfsound	59°12′27″N 2°44′59″W		
Sealskerry Bay	Calfsound	59°10′09″N 2°49′09″W		
Whitemaw Bay	Calfsound	59°08′54″N 2°47′39″W		

== Egilsay ==
Name	Nearest Town	Coordinates	image	Notes
Bay of Skaill		59°08′46″N 2°56′27″W		
Bay of Vady		59°08′21″N 2°56′13″W		

== Eynhallow ==
The small island of Eynhallow has no bays.

== Fara ==
Name	Nearest Town	Coordinates	image	Notes
Peat Bay		58°51′07″N 3°10′35″W		

== Faray ==
Name	Nearest Town	Coordinates	image	Notes
Bight of Sandbister		59°12′31″N 2°49′44″W		

== Flotta ==
Name	Nearest Town	Coordinates	image	Notes
Kirk Bay		58°48′59″N 3°05′54″W		
Pan Hope		58°49′57″N 3°05′52″W		
Scat Wick		58°48′54″N 3°07′09″W		
Tween the Wicks		58°50′50″N 3°03′57″W		

== Gairsay ==
Name	Nearest Town	Coordinates	image	Notes
Millburn Bay	Orkney	59°04′40″N 2°57′34″W		
Russness Bay	Orkney	59°05′00″N 2°57′22″W		

== Glimps Holm ==
The island of Glimps Holm in the Holm Sound has no bays.

== Graemsay ==
Name	Nearest Town	Coordinates	image	Notes
Bay of Sandside	Orkney	58°56′07″N 3°16′59″W		

== Helliar Holm ==
The small island of Helliar Holm has no bays.

== Holm of Faray ==
Name	Nearest Town	Coordinates	image	Notes
Inniens Bay		59°14′04″N 2°50′03″W		

== Holm of Grimbister ==
The small island of Holm of Grimbister off the mainland coast has no bays.

== Holm of Huip ==
The small island of Holm of Huip has no bays.

== Holm of Papa ==
The small island of Holm of Papa has no bays.

== Holm of Scockness ==
The small island of Holm of Scockness has no bays.

== Hoy ==
Name	Nearest Town	Coordinates	image	Notes
Aith Hope	Saltness	58°47′06″N 3°13′56″W		
Bay of Creekland	Quoydale	58°55′17″N 3°19′09″W		
Bay of the Stairs	Quoydale	58°55′20″N 3°23′14″W		
Bay of the Tongue	Quoydale	58°55′26″N 3°22′57″W		
Bay of Quoys	Quoydale	58°54′38″N 3°18′44″W		
Chalmers' Hope	Quoyness	58°53′20″N 3°14′23″W		
Ha Wick		58°46′57″N 3°18′09″W		
Little Rack Wick		58°49′00″N 3°20′04″W		
Lyrawa Bay	Quoyness	58°52′16″N 3°13′10″W		
Mill Bay	Lyness	58°50′36″N 3°12′19″W		
North Bay	Saltness	58°47′42″N 3°13′58″W		
Ore Bay	Lyness	58°49′44″N 3°11′49″W		
Pegal Bay	Lyness	58°51′41″N 3°12′56″W		
Rysa Bay	Lyness	58°51′01″N 3°11′56″W		
Rackwick Bay	Rackwick	58°51′55″N 3°23′14″W		
The Pow	Quoydale	58°55′55″N 3°20′52″W		

Note: North Bay is listed twice, once under Hoy and once under South Walls. It is the same bay, with the same geographical co-ordinates shown, and lies between the two islands.

== Hunda ==
Name	Nearest Town	Coordinates	image	Notes
The Hope	Orkney	58°51′00″N 2°59′05″W		

== Inner Holm ==
The very small island of Inner Holm has no bays.

== Lamb Holm ==
The very small island of Lamb Holm has no bays

== Linga Holm ==
The small island of Linga Holm has no bays.

== Muckle Green Holm ==
The small island of Muckle Green Holm has no bays.

== Muckle Skerry ==
Name	Nearest Town	Coordinates	image	Notes
Scartan Bay		58°41′20″N 2°55′00″W		

== North Ronaldsay ==
Name	Nearest Town	Coordinates	image	Notes
Bay of Ryasgeo	Hollandstoun	59°22′44″N 2°26′05″W		
Bay of Sjaivar	Hollandstoun	59°23′10″N 2°22′16″W		
Garso Wick	Hollandstoun	59°23′18″N 2°24′09″W		
Lens Wick	Hollandstoun	59°23′20″N 2°25′11″W		
Linklet Bay	Hollandstoun	59°22′28″N 2°24′01″W		
South Bay	Hollandstoun	59°21′14″N 2°26′01″W		

== Orkney Mainland ==
Name	Nearest Town	Coordinates	image	Notes
Bay of Ayre	Kirkwall	58°53′37″N 2°54′54″W		
Bay of Berstane	Kirkwall	58°58′47″N 2°55′00″W		
Bay of Carness	Kirkwall	59°00′36″N 2°55′21″W		
Bay of Cornquoy	St Mary's, Orkney	58°52′30″N 2°50′16″W		
Bay of Deepdale	Kirkwall	58°55′22″N 2°57′22″W		
Bay of Firth	Kirkwall	59°00′32″N 3°05′24″W		
Bay of Ireland	Stromness	58°58′06″N 3°14′55″W		
Bay of Isbister	Isbister	59°02′32″N 3°02′36″W		
Bay of Kirkwall	Tankerness	58°59′56″N 2°57′59″W		
Bay of Latherbare	Tankerness	58°58′58″N 2°47′42″W		
Bay of Lea Taing	Tankerness	58°58′49″N 2°47′31″W		
Bay of Navershaw	Stromness	58°57′45″N 3°16′18″W		
Bay of Hinderayre	Gorseness	59°03′33″N 3°00′13″W		
Bay of Houton	Houton	58°54′54″N 3°11′13″W		
Bay of Meil	Kirkwall	58°59′45″N 2°54′12″W		
Bay of Myre	Houton	58°55′03″N 3°10′24″W		
Bay of Puldrite	Kirkwall	59°03′00″N 3°00′33″W		
Bay of Sandber	St Mary's, Orkney	58°53′27″N 2°55′25″W		
Bay of Sandoyne	St Mary's, Orkney	58°54′06″N 2°56′10″W		
Bay of Semolie	St Mary's, Orkney	58°53′10″N 2°49′02″W		
Bay of Skaill	Quoyloo	59°03′12″N 3°20′37″W		
Bay of Suckquoy	Tankerness	58°55′15″N 2°49′29″W		
Bay of Weyland	Kirkwall	58°59′28″N 2°57′03″W		
Bay of Work	Kirkwall	59°00′05″N 2°54′30″W		
Billia Croo	Stromness	58°58′23″N 3°21′17″W		
Bight of Mousland	Stromness	58°59′31″N 3°21′47″W		
Birsay Bay	Birsay	59°07′35″N 3°19′54″W		
Bor Wick	Stromness	59°01′52″N 3°21′18″W		
Clivie Bay	Upper Sanday	58°54′24″N 2°47′38″W		
Cumminess Bay	Stromness	58°58′17″N 3°14′33″W		
Den Wick	Skaill	58°58′03″N 2°43′58″W		
Dingyshowe Bay	Upper Sanday	58°54′51″N 2°47′05″W		
Hangie Bay	Tankerness	58°58′35″N 2°47′36″W		
Hamnavoe	Stromness	58°57′55″N 3°17′32″W		
Howes Wick	St Mary's, Orkney	58°53′17″N 2°51′00″W		
Inganess Bay	Kirkwall	58°58′17″N 2°52′24″W		
Mar Wick	Birsay	59°05′51″N 3°21′02″W		
Newark Bay	Snippigar	58°55′16″N 2°44′48″W		
Orphir Bay	Houton	58°55′09″N 3°09′23″W		
Rack Wick	Stromness	58°58′06″N 3°21′21″W		
Roanaby	Stromness	58°56′15″N 2°42′48″W		
Sailhouse Bay	Stromness	58°56′43″N 3°14′13″W		
Sandside Bay	Deerness	58°56′38″N 2°42′32″W		
Scapa Bay	Kirkwall	58°56′55″N 2°59′28″W		
St Mary's Bay	St Mary's, Orkney	58°53′15″N 2°54′48″W		
St Peter's Bay	Upper Sanday	58°55′28″N 2°48′12″W		
St Peter's Pool	Upper Sanday	58°55′21″N 2°47′30″W		
Swanbister Bay	Swanbister	58°55′36″N 3°06′32″W		
Taracliff Bay	Upper Sanday	58°54′55″N 2°46′41″W		
The Spord	Quoyloo	59°04′40″N 3°20′58″W		
Waulkmill Bay	Swanbister	58°56′11″N 3°04′36″W		
Warebeth	Stromness	58°57′29″N 3°20′01″W		
Wass Wick		59°04′54″N 3°01′25″W		
Wood Wick		59°05′53″N 3°03′13″W		

== Papa Stronsay ==
Name	Nearest Town	Coordinates	image	Notes
Bight of Stackaback		59°08′56″N 2°35′44″W		

== Papa Westray ==
Name	Nearest Town	Coordinates	image	Notes
Bay of Burland		59°20′14″N 2°52′42″W		
Bay of Hookin		59°20′47″N 2°52′52″W		
Bay of Moclett		59°19′36″N 2°53′45″W		
North Wick		59°21′43″N 2°52′41″W		
South Wick		59°21′29″N 2°52′36″W		

== Rousay ==
Name	Nearest Town	Coordinates	image	Notes
Bay of Ham	Sourin	59°10′20″N 2°57′53″W		
Bay of Moaness	Frotoft	59°08′40″N 3°05′39″W		
Bay of Swandro	Frotoft	59°08′47″N 3°05′44″W		
Bay of Westness	Frotoft	59°08′30″N 3°05′05″W		
Saviskaill Bay	Sourin	59°11′16″N 3°00′46″W		

== Rysa Little ==
The small island of Rysa Little has no bays.

== Sanday ==
Name	Nearest Town	Coordinates	image	Notes
Backaskail Bay	Backaskail	59°13′56″N 2°37′21″W		
Bay of Brough	Lady	59°15′44″N 2°36′35″W		
Bay of Lopness	Northwall	59°16′02″N 2°28′59″W		
Bay of Newark	Lady	59°14′27″N 2°30′24″W		
Bay of Sandquoy	Northwall	59°17′39″N 2°27′37″W		
Bay of Sowerdie	Northwall	59°18′03″N 2°25′08″W		
Bay of Stove	Stove	59°11′30″N 2°40′58″W		
Bay of Tresness	Lady	59°14′08″N 2°38′04″W		
Bay of Wheevi	Northwall	59°16′34″N 2°24′46″W		
Bight of Lotheran	Northwall	59°16′34″N 2°23′24″W		
Braes Wick	Lady	59°13′21″N 2°41′37″W		
Kettletoft Bay	Lady	59°13′30″N 2°34′58″W		
Otters Wick	Lady	59°17′07″N 2°31′25″W		
Pool Bay	Lady	59°13′39″N 2°40′38″W		
Roos Wick	Burness	59°17′39″N 2°36′23″W		
Scuthvie Bay	Northwall	59°17′08″N 2°23′52″W		
Sty Wick	Lady	59°13′58″N 2°33′17″W		
Whitemill Bay	Burness	59°18′31″N 2°32′32″W		

== Shapinsay ==
Name	Nearest Town	Coordinates	image	Notes
Bay of Crook	Balfour	59°02′47″N 2°49′16″W		
Bay of Furrowend	Balfour	59°03′17″N 2°55′18″W		
Bay of Linton	Balfour	59°03′00″N 2°49′11″W		
Bay of Sandgarth	Balfour	59°01′23″N 2°50′25″W		
Elwick Bay	Balfour	59°01′57″N 2°54′08″W		
Innsker	Balfour	59°04′44″N 2°50′06″W		
Veantrow Bay	Balfour	59°04′08″N 2°52′07″W		

== South Ronaldsay ==
Name	Nearest Town	Coordinates	image	Notes
Barswick	Mossetter	58°45′45″N 2°59′01″W		
Bur Wick	Greamston	58°43′54″N 2°57′53″W		
Dam of Hoxa	St Margaret's Hope	58°49′47″N 2°59′30″W		
Gill Bay	St Margaret's Hope	58°50′07″N 2°58′17″W		
Hoston Bay	Lower Olad	58°46′10″N 2°58′48″W		
Hune Bay	Sandwick	58°46′26″N 2°58′53″W		
Manse Bay	St Margaret's Hope	58°48′43″N 2°54′24″W		
Newark Bay	Mossetter	58°47′56″N 2°55′15″W		
Oyce of Herston	St Margaret's Hope	58°48′16″N 2°59′24″W		
Oyce of Quindry	St Margaret's Hope	58°48′48″N 2°59′17″W		
Pool of Cletts	Cletts	58°48′00″N 2°55′15″W		
Sand Wick	St Margaret's Hope	58°47′03″N 2°59′10″W		
St Margaret's Hope	St Margaret's Hope	58°49′57″N 2°57′12″W		
Widewall Bay	St Margaret's Hope	58°49′08″N 3°00′29″W		
Wind Wick	Mossetter	58°46′07″N 2°56′05″W		

== South Walls ==
Name	Nearest Town	Coordinates	image	Notes
Kirk Hope	Hackness	58°47′30″N 3°08′34″W		
Myre Bay	Hackness	58°48′10″N 3°09′52″W		
North Bay	Wyng	58°47′42″N 3°13′58″W		

== Start Point ==
The small tidal island of Start Point has no bays.

== Stronsay ==
Name	Nearest Town	Coordinates	image	Notes
Bay of Bomasty	Whitehall	59°05′53″N 2°40′26″W		
Bay of Franks	Whitehall	59°08′49″N 2°37′18″W		
Bight of Aith	Whitehall	59°06′04″N 2°37′13″W		
Bight of Baywest	Whitehall	59°06′08″N 2°40′18″W		
Bight of Doonatown	Whitehall	59°06′01″N 2°39′16″W		
Bay of Holland	Whitehall	59°05′34″N 2°37′38″W		
Bay of Houseby	Whitehall	59°04′44″N 2°33′32″W		
Bight of Matpow	Whitehall	59°06′47″N 2°37′50″W		
Bight of Scarma	Whitehall	59°04′40″N 2°36′29″W		
Mill Bay	Whitehall	59°07′36″N 2°35′05″W		
Odin Bay	Whitehall	59°06′26″N 2°32′26″W		
Oyce of Huip	Whitehall	59°09′11″N 2°37′34″W		
Pow of the Sty	Whitehall	59°07′15″N 2°33′13″W		
St Catherine's Bay	Whitehall	59°07′30″N 2°39′42″W		

== Switha ==
Name	Nearest Town	Coordinates	image	Notes
The Pool		58°47′49″N 3°06′36″W		

== Sweyn Holm ==
The small island of Sweyn Holm has no bays.

== Swona ==
Name	Nearest Town	Coordinates	image	Notes
The Brook		58°44′52″N 3°03′28″W		

== Westray ==
Name	Nearest Town	Coordinates	image	Notes
Bay of Brough	Pierowall	59°18′43″N 2°57′17″W		
Bay of Cubbigeo	Skelwick	59°16′24″N 2°54′38″W		
Bay of Cleat	Pierowall	59°18′28″N 2°55′50″W		
Bay of Havey	Skelwick	59°17′58″N 2°53′53″W		
Bay of Kirbist	Pierowall	59°16′19″N 3°00′35″W		
Bay of Noup	Pierowall	59°19′49″N 3°01′29″W		
Bay of Pierowall	Pierowall	59°19′17″N 2°58′11″W		
Bay of Skaill	Pierowall	59°20′37″N 2°57′07″W		
Bay of Swartmill	Skelwick	59°18′10″N 2°54′52″W		
Bay of Tafts	Skelwick	59°15′05″N 2°52′58″W		
Bay of Tuquoy	Skelwick	59°16′44″N 2°56′29″W		
Bight of Stangerhead	Rapness	59°16′09″N 2°51′41″W		
Hooro Nev	Pierowall	59°17′10″N 3°01′08″W		
Monivey	Pierowall	59°19′04″N 3°03′22″W		
Rack Wick	Pierowall	59°20′12″N 2°59′12″W		
Rack Wick	Skelwick	59°16′08″N 2°52′43″W		
Skel Wick	Skelwick	59°17′36″N 2°53′19″W		
The Vian	Rackwick	59°21′21″N 2°56′41″W		

== Wyre ==
Name	Nearest Town	Coordinates	image	Notes
Bay of Bergeben		59°06′47″N 2°59′53″W		
Bay of Cott		59°06′46″N 2°58′49″W		
Bay of Stromnesstaing		59°06′40″N 2°57′52″W		
Bay of Whelkmulli		59°06′51″N 3°00′20″W		

== See also ==
- List of bays of Scotland
- List of bays of the Inner Hebrides
- List of bays of the Outer Hebrides
- List of bays of the Firth of Clyde
- List of bays of the Shetland Islands
