= List of bays of the Outer Hebrides =

This List of Bays of Outer Hebrides summarises the bays that are located on the islands of the Outer Hebrides in Scotland.

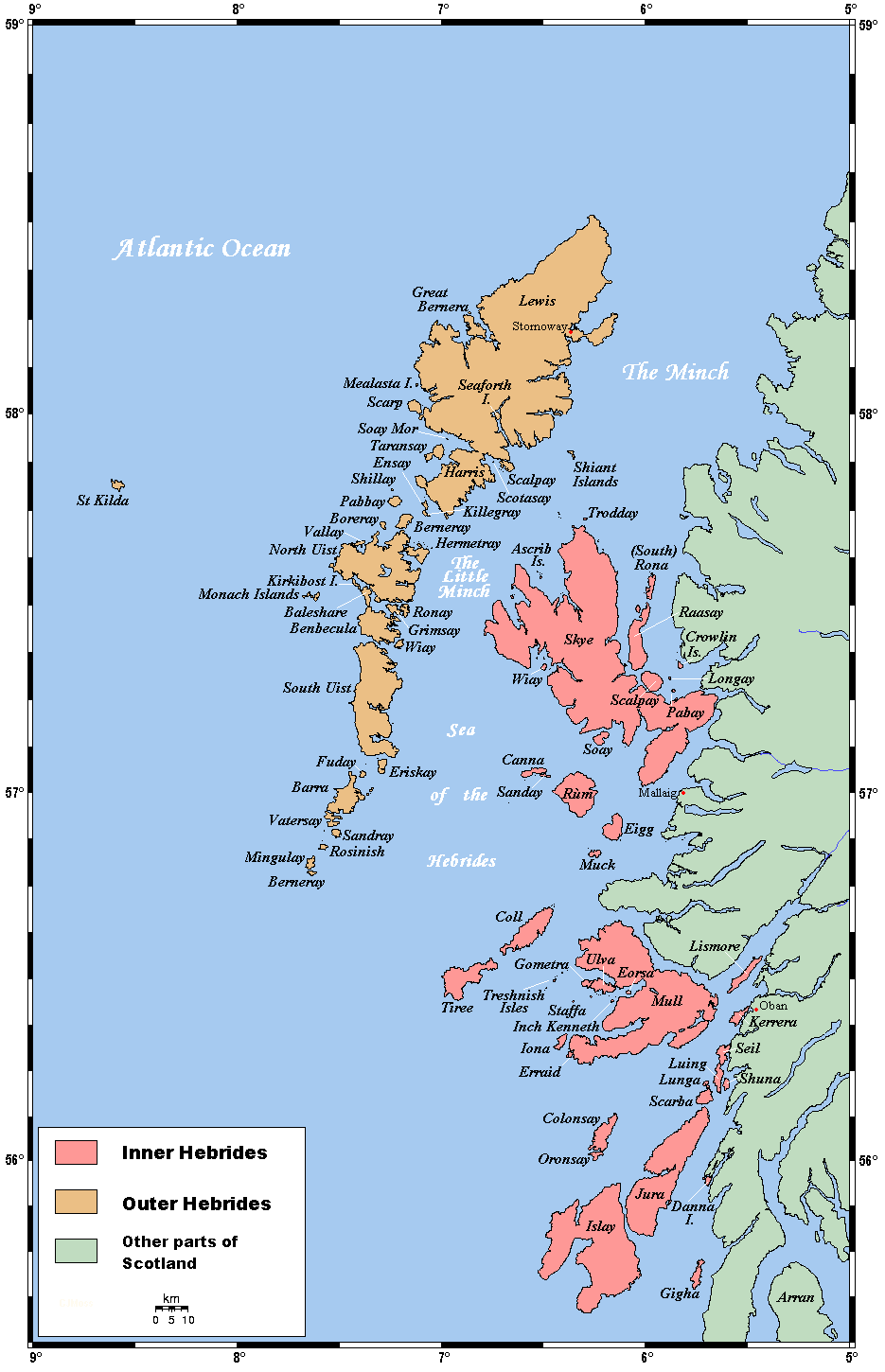
A map of the Inner and Outer Hebrides in Scotland. The Outer Hebrides are shown in Brown

== Lewis and Harris ==
=== Lewis ===
Name	County	Nearest Town	Coordinates	Image	Notes
Broad Bay, Lewis	Ross and Cromarty	Stornoway	58°15′32″N 6°14′54″W		
Bàgh Dubh	Ross and Cromarty	Garrabost	58°12′50″N 6°09′48″W		
Bàgh a' Chnoic Ghairbh	Ross and Cromarty		58°24′26″N 5°05′14″W		
Bàgh a Tuath	Ross and Cromarty	Garrabost	58°13′04″N 6°09′41″W		
Bàgh an Annaite	Ross and Cromarty		58°24′39″N 5°03′58″W		
Bàgh an Aoil	Ross and Cromarty		58°24′10″N 5°04′38″W		
Bàgh Charragraich	Ross and Cromarty	Tarbert	57°53′10″N 6°44′15″W		
Bàgh Chliasmol	Ross and Cromarty	Tarbert	57°56′47″N 6°56′16″W		
Bàgh Ciarach	Ross and Cromarty	Arivruaich	57°55′15″N 6°38′28″W		
Bàgh Dhail Beag	Ross and Cromarty	Carloway	58°18′54″N 6°44′29″W		
Bàgh Dhail Mòr	Ross and Cromarty	Carloway	58°18′30″N 6°45′31″W		
Bàgh Fiabhaig	Ross and Cromarty	Timsgarry	58°12′32″N 7°03′00″W		
Bàgh Hùisinis	Ross and Cromarty	Ardhasaig	57°59′30″N 7°05′24″W		
Bàgh na Bèiste	Ross and Cromarty	Bayble	58°12′34″N 6°10′11″W		
Bàgh na Grèine	Ross and Cromarty	Bayble	58°13′12″N 6°09′29″W		
Bàgh Phabail	Ross and Cromarty	Bayble	58°11′42″N 6°12′06″W		
Bàgh Phort Mholair	Ross and Cromarty	Broker	58°15′01″N 6°08′31″W		
Bàgh Sheiseadair	Ross and Cromarty	Broker	58°13′41″N 6°09′45″W		
Bàgh Shuardail	Ross and Cromarty	Aignish	58°11′51″N 6°16′45″W		
Bàgh Theilisnis	Ross and Cromarty	Bun Abhainn Eadarra	57°55′58″N 6°53′14″W		
Bàgh Thuilm	Ross and Cromarty	Stornoway	58°11′26″N 6°20′09″W		
Bàgh Urgha	Ross and Cromarty	Tarbert	57°53′36″N 6°45′37″W		
Bàgh Urgha Beag	Ross and Cromarty	Tarbert	57°53′47″N 6°46′31″W		
Bàgh Àird a' Mhulaidh	Ross and Cromarty	Tarbert	57°59′46″N 6°45′03″W		
Callaige	Ross and Cromarty	New Tolsta	58°22′47″N 6°12′31″W		
Camas a' Mhoil	Ross and Cromarty	Mangursta	58°06′50″N 7°07′13″W		
Camas Bostadh	Ross and Cromarty	Breaclete	58°15′35″N 6°53′03″W		
Camas Chala Moil	Ross and Cromarty	Islibhig	58°05′41″N 7°06′21″W		
Camas Chalaboist	Ross and Cromarty	Calbost	58°04′06″N 6°22′40″W		
Camas Chlèidir	Ross and Cromarty	Lslibhig	58°08′40″N 7°06′46″W		
Camas Creag Mhurchaidh Mhòir	Ross and Cromarty	Broker	58°15′13″N 6°08′19″W		
Camas Geodhachan an Duilisg	Ross and Cromarty	Aird Uig	58°14′06″N 7°02′29″W		
Camas Islibhig	Ross and Cromarty	Mangersta	58°08′18″N 7°07′09″W		
Camas na Clibhe	Ross and Cromarty	Valtos	58°13′25″N 6°58′54″W		
Camas na h-Airde	Ross and Cromarty	Aird Uig	58°14′06″N 7°01′18″W		
Ceann a' Bhàigh	Ross and Cromarty	Earshader	58°10′54″N 6°51′37″W		
Camas Thomascro	Ross and Cromarty	Habost	57°56′18″N 6°29′54″W		
Camas Uig	Ross and Cromarty	Timsgarry	58°11′38″N 7°03′05″W		
Chubag	Ross and Cromarty	Stornoway	58°11′41″N 6°19′42″W		
Cunndal	Ross and Cromarty	Swainbost	58°30′24″N 6°16′45″W		
Bàgh Ghòbhaig	Ross and Cromarty	Ardhasaig	57°58′18″N 7°03′29″W		
Lùib a' Chairn	Ross and Cromarty	Eishken	58°00′27″N 6°29′47″W		
Mol Truisg	Ross and Cromarty		57°57′35″N 6°28′23″W		
Port Beag	Ross and Cromarty	North Tolsta	58°20′17″N 6°11′42″W		
Port nam Bothaig	Ross and Cromarty	North Tolsta	58°20′04″N 6°12′00″W		
Siorrabhaig	Ross and Cromarty	Upper Shader	58°23′56″N 6°29′53″W	|	
Spàinebhig	Ross and Cromarty	Lionel	58°29′48″N 6°13′31″W		
Tòb Bhrolluim	Ross and Cromarty		57°56′16″N 6°31′42″W		
Tòb chollabhaig	Ross and Cromarty	Callanish	58°11′23″N 6°45′38″W		
Tòb a' Stigh Rubha Fir Ùige	Ross and Cromarty		58°00′05″N 6°29′18″W		
Tòb Lemreway	Ross and Cromarty		57°56′16″N 6°31′42″W		
Tòb Àird Callanish	Ross and Cromarty	Earshader	58°12′05″N 6°48′51″W		
Tòb a' Stigh Rubha Fir Ùig	Ross and Cromarty		58°00′05″N 6°29′18″W		
Tob Smuaisibhig	Ross and Cromarty		57°56′25″N 6°36′40″W		
Tòb na Craoibhe	Ross and Cromarty	Earshader	58°11′06″N 6°52′15″W		
Tòb na Sgeire Mòire	Ross and Cromarty	Earshader	58°11′01″N 6°52′08″W		
Tòb Rubha an t-Seasgaich	Ross and Cromarty	Earshader	58°10′56″N 6°51′51″W		
Tòb Rubha nan Lion	Ross and Cromarty	Valtos	58°10′56″N 6°51′45″W		
Tòb nan Tunnag	Ross and Cromarty	Earshader	58°11′45″N 6°51′07″W		
Ob Ceann a' Ghàraidh	Ross and Cromarty	Tarbert	57°53′04″N 6°43′12″W		

=== Lewis (Loch Seaforth) ===
==== Seaforth Island ====
Seaforth Island located in Loch Seaforth has no bays.

=== Lewis (Loch Sealg) ===
==== Eilean Liubhaird ====
Name	County	Nearest Village	Coordinates	Image	Notes
Bàgh	Ross and Cromarty		57°59′55″N 6°25′44″W		
Puill chriadha	Ross and Cromarty		58°00′08″N 6°26′53″W		
Tob Sgarbh Sgeir	Ross and Cromarty		57°59′50″N 6°25′08″W		
Tob Rubha na Caora Duibhe	Ross and Cromarty		57°59′53″N 6°26′31″W		

=== Lewis (Park) ===
==== Eilean Mhealasta ====
Name	County	Nearest Village	Coordinates	Image	Notes
Camas Leire Geodha	Ross and Cromarty		58°04′54″N 7°07′58″W		

=== Lewis (Loch Erisort) ===
==== Eilean Chaluim Chille ====
The inshore island of Eilean Chaluim Chille in the Loch Erisort sea loch, has no bays.

=== Lewis (Loch Ròg) ===
==== Ceabhaigh ====
The small island of Ceabhaigh, located in the outer part of the Loch Ròg sea loch, has no bays.

==== Eilean Chearstaidh ====
The small island of Eilean Chearstaidh, located in inner part of the Loch Ròg sea loch, has no bays.

==== Flodaigh ====
The small off-shore island of Flodaigh has no bays.

==== Fuaigh Beag ====
The small island of Fuaigh Beag has no bays.

==== Fuaigh Mòr ====
The small island of Fuaigh Mòr has no bays.

==== Great Bernera ====
Name	County	Nearest Town	Coordinates	Image	Notes
Bàgh Chlann Neill		Breaclete	58°15′17″N 6°53′32″W		
Camas Bostadh		Breaclete	58°15′35″N 6°53′03″W		
Camas Eunaigh		Breaclete	58°15′31″N 6°53′28″W		
Camas Sanndaig		Breaclete	58°14′16″N 6°52′48″W		

==== Little Bernera ====
The small island of Little Bernera (Scottish Gaelic: Beàrnaraigh Beag) has no bays.

==== Pabaigh Mòr ====
The uninhabited island of Pabaigh Mòr has no bays.

==== Vacsay ====
Name	County	Nearest Village	Coordinates	Image	Notes
Bàgh Tòb a' Mhorghain	Inverness-shire		58°13′55″N 6°55′03″W		
Tòb an T-Seann Bhaile	Inverness-shire		58°13′41″N 6°55′09″W		

=== Harris ===
Name	County	Nearest Town	Coordinates	Image	Notes
Bàgh Chàirminis	Na h-Eileanan an Iar	Leverburgh	57°45′08″N 7°00′19″W		
Bàgh Direcleit	Na h-Eileanan Siar	Tarbert	57°53′01″N 6°48′11″W		
Bàgh Stìthcleit	Na h-Eileanan an Iar	Tarbert	57°54′08″N 6°51′24″W		
Bagh Steinigidh	Na h-Eileanan an Iar	Borve	57°50′09″N 7°01′30″W		
Camas a' Bhualt			57°49′52″N 6°44′23″W		
Camas an Liuthaire	Na h-Eileanan an Iar	Scarista	57°49′48″N 7°07′50″W		
Camas na Roide	Na h-Eileanan an Iar	Tarbert	57°50′22″N 6°44′35″W		
Òb Liceasto	Na h-Eileanan an Iar	Tarbert	57°53′12″N 6°47′24″W		
Òb Mhiabhaig	Na h-Eileanan an Iar	Tarbert	57°52′02″N 6°47′42″W		
Ob Scalla	Na h-Eileanan an Iar	Ardvey	57°47′37″N 6°51′24″W		

==== Pabbay ====
Name	County	Nearest Town	Coordinates	Image	Notes
Bàgh Alairip	Na h-Eileanan an Iar		57°46′58″N 7°14′29″W		

==== Scalpay ====
Name	County	Nearest Town	Coordinates	Image	Notes
Acairseid Fhalaich	Na h-Eileanan an Iar		57°52′23″N 6°40′03″W		
An Acairsaid a Deas	Na h-Eileanan an Iar		57°51′43″N 6°41′33″W		
An Acarsaid a Tuath	Na h-Eileanan an Iar		57°52′33″N 6°42′08″W		
Bàgh na Muice	Na h-Eileanan an Iar		57°52′23″N 6°42′33″W		
Sgorabhaig	Na h-Eileanan an Iar		57°52′02″N 6°39′05″W		

==== Scarp ====
The island of Scarp (Scottish Gaelic: An Sgarp), west of Hushinish on Harris has no bays.

==== Soay Mor ====
The tiny island of Soay Mòr (Scottish Gaelic: Sòdhaigh Mòr) in West Loch Tarbert has no bays.

==== Stockinish Island ====
The uninhabited Stockinish Island (Scottish Gaelic: Eilean Stocainis) off the coast of Harris has no bays.

==== Taransay ====
Name	County	Nearest Town	Coordinates	Image	Notes
Bàgh a' Chàigeal	Inverness-shire		57°53′20″N 7°04′51″W		
Camas Chleiter	Inverness-shire		57°53′10″N 7°04′50″W		
Camas an t-Saoithein	Inverness-shire		57°55′12″N 7°01′14″W		
Cealach na h-Atha	Inverness-shire		57°53′50″N 6°59′20″W		

=== Harris (East Loch Tarbert) ===
==== Eilean Chearstaidh ====
The small uninhabited island of Eilean Chearstaidh in Loch Roag has no bays.

==== Flodday ====
There are two "Flodday"s near Barra. One is in the Barra Isles at grid reference NL612924, the other in the Sound of Barra to the north at grid reference NF751022. The island of Flodday in the Barra Isles group at 56.898653°N 7.567038°W has no bays. The island of Flodday in the Sound of Barra at 56.898653°N 7.567038°W has no bays.

== Loch Maddy ==
=== Ceallasaigh Beag ===
The small low-lying island of Ceallasaigh Beag had no bays.

=== Ceallasaigh Mòr ===
The small low-lying island of Ceallasaigh Mòr had no bays

== Monach Islands ==
=== Ceann Ear ===
Name	County	Nearest Village	Coordinates	Image	Notes
Port Ruadh	Inverness-shire		57°31′09″N 7°36′36″W		
Seana Phort	Inverness-shire		57°31′27″N 7°36′05″W		

=== Ceann Iar ===
Name	County	Nearest Village	Coordinates	Image	Notes
Croic	Inverness-shire		57°31′49″N 7°38′41″W		

== Shiant Islands ==
=== Eilean Mhuire ===
Name	County	Nearest Village	Coordinates	Image	Notes
Bàgh Chlann Neill	Ross and Cromarty		57°54′05″N 6°19′56″W		
Bàgh Hacanais	Ross and Cromarty		57°31′24″N 7°38′52″W		

=== Garbh Eilean ===
The small island Garbh Eilean in the Shiant Islands group have no bays.

== Barra Isles ==
=== Barra ===
Name	County	Nearest Village	Coordinates	Image	Notes
An Acairseid	Inverness-shire	Bruernish	56°59′01″N 7°22′41″W		
Bàgh Beag	Inverness-shire	Castlebay	56°56′57″N 7°30′06″W		
Bàgh Halaman	Inverness-shire	Borve	56°58′27″N 7°31′42″W		
Bàgh nan Clach	Inverness-shire	Eoligarry	57°02′50″N 7°27′10″W		
Castlebay	Inverness-shire	Castlebay	56°56′47″N 7°29′01″W		

=== Berneray ===
Name	County	Nearest Town	Coordinates	Image	Notes
Sloc an Ime	Inverness-shire		56°46′47″N 7°37′48″W		
Sloc Greiligeo	Inverness-shire		56°46′43″N 7°38′04″W		
Sloc Veacligeo	Inverness-shire		56°46′45″N 7°38′28″W	|	
Sloc Ceann a' Ghàrraidh	Inverness-shire		56°46′49″N 7°37′36″W		

=== Flodday ===
The small island of Flodday, located to the south of Vatersay has no bays.

=== Lingeigh ===
The small island of Lingeigh has no bays.

=== Mingulay ===
Name	County	Nearest Town	Coordinates	Image	Notes
Bàgh na h-Aoineig	Inverness-shire		56°48′44″N 7°39′19″W		
Bàgh Hunadudh	Inverness-shirer		56°49′26″N 7°37′11″W		
Bàgh Mhiùghlaigh	Inverness-shire		56°48′40″N 7°37′24″W		
Bàgh Slèiteadh	Inverness-shire		56°49′22″N 7°38′53″W		
Bay Analepp	Inverness-shire		56°49′32″N 7°37′58″W		
Sloc Dubh an Dùin	Inverness-shire		56°48′02″N 7°39′35″W		
Sloc Hèisegeo	Inverness-shire		56°47′56″N 7°39′21″W		

=== Muldoanich ===
The small uninhabited island of Muldoanich (Gaelic: Maol Dòmhnaich) has no bays.

=== Pabbay ===
Name	County	Nearest Town	Coordinates	Image	Notes
Bàgh Bàn	Inverness-shire		56°51′03″N 7°33′34″W		
Sloc Grànda	Inverness-shire		56°51′33″N 7°35′05″W		
Sloc Glamairidhgeo	Inverness-shire		56°50′56″N 7°34′53″W		
Sloc Glansaich	Inverness-shire		56°51′19″N 7°35′33″W		

=== Sandray ===
Name	County	Nearest Town	Coordinates	Image	Notes
Bàgh Bàn	Inverness-shire		56°53′59″N 7°30′14″W		

=== Vatersay ===
Name	County	Nearest Town	Coordinates	Image	Notes
Bàgh Chornaig	Inverness-shire	Baile Bhatarsaigh	56°56′25″N 7°31′39″W		
Bàgh Bhatarsaigh	Inverness-shire	Baile Bhatarsaigh	56°55′39″N 7°30′38″W		
Bàgh a' Deas	Inverness-shire	Baile Bhatarsaigh	56°54′42″N 7°31′38″W		
Bàgh Siar	Inverness-shire	Baile Bhatarsaigh	56°55′33″N 7°33′14″W		

== Uist and Benbecula ==
=== Baleshare ===
Name	County	Nearest Village	Coordinates	Image	Notes
Bàgh an Tobair	Inverness-shire	Balivanich	57°32′01″N 7°20′45″W		
Bàgh Leachdach	Inverness-shire		57°32′29″N 7°22′06″W		
Bàgh Salach	Inverness-shire		57°31′51″N 7°20′41″W		

=== Benbecula ===
Name	County	Nearest Village	Coordinates	Image	Notes
Bàgh na Muice	Inverness-shire	Balivanich	57°28′04″N 7°14′04″W		
Bàgh Hiùrabhagh	Inverness-shire		57°26′18″N 7°16′12″W		
Bàgh a' Bhràoige	Inverness-shire		57°24′32″N 7°12′13″W		
Bàgh Niabhag	Inverness-shire		57°26′57″N 7°14′45″W		
Bàgh Sgaraileòd	Inverness-shire		57°26′40″N 7°14′55″W		
Cula	Inverness-shire		57°27′34″N 7°24′18″W		

=== Eriskay ===
Name	County	Nearest Village	Coordinates	Image	Notes
Sloc Liath	Inverness-shire		57°03′38″N 7°16′58″W		

=== Flodaigh ===
The tidal island of Flodaigh, lying to the north of Benbecula has no bays.

=== Fraoch-Eilean ===
The tidal island of Fraoch-Eilean has no bays.

=== Grimsay North ===
Name	County	Nearest Town	Coordinates	Image	Notes
Bàgh Dubh	Inverness-shire		57°29′05″N 7°14′12″W		
Bàgh Sgotbheinn	Inverness-shire		57°28′57″N 7°14′03″W		
Bàgh Mhic Rath	Inverness-shire		57°28′57″N 7°14′03″W		

=== Grimsay South ===
The tidal island of Grimsay (South) has no bays.

=== North Uist ===
Name	County	Nearest Town	Coordinates	Image	Notes
Acairseid Fhalaich	Inverness-shire	Strumore	57°33′30″N 7°09′58″W		
Acarsaid Lì	Inverness-shire	Strumore	57°33′44″N 7°10′23″W		
Bàgh a' Bhiorain	Inverness-shire	Strumore	57°33′03″N 7°10′21″W		
Bàgh Àird nam Madadh	Inverness-shire	Strumore	57°35′27″N 7°07′42″W		
Bàgh an Ackara	Inverness-shire	Sollas	57°39′08″N 7°25′45″W		
Bàgh Blàsguidh	Inverness-shire	Sollas	57°39′39″N 7°29′18″W		
Bàgh Caolas an Eilein	Inverness-shire	Strumore	57°35′23″N 7°09′13″W		
Bàgh Charaigearraidh	Inverness-shire	Strumore	57°33′30″N 7°08′33″W		
Bàgh Gearraidh Mhic Amhlaidh	Inverness-shire	Carinish	57°30′28″N 7°18′58″W		
Bàgh Hogha Glan	Inverness-shire	Hougharry	57°37′14″N 7°31′19″W		
Bàgh Lobhta	Inverness-shire	Carinish	57°30′34″N 7°18′11″W		
Bàgh Mòraig	Inverness-shire	Carinish	57°30′45″N 7°09′55″W		
Bàgh nan Craobhag	Inverness-shire	Sollas	57°39′56″N 7°24′58″W		
Bàgh Salach	Inverness-shire	Carinish	57°30′36″N 7°18′00″W		
Bàgh Sgolpaig	Inverness-shire	Hosta	57°39′10″N 7°29′25″W		
Bàgh Spònais	Inverness-shire	Strumore	57°33′33″N 7°12′12″W		
Bàgh Teileam	Inverness-shire	Strumore	57°39′45″N 7°26′07″W		
Camas na Crìche	Inverness-shire	Sollas	57°39′41″N 7°25′52″W		
Ceann Bàgh Sìth	Inverness-shire	Strumore	57°33′39″N 7°10′31″W		
Port na Copa	Inverness-shire	Sollas	57°38′51″N 7°29′36″W		

==== Boreray ====
Name	County	Nearest Village	Coordinates	Image	Notes
Breivik	Inverness-shire		57°42′42″N 7°16′38″W		

==== Flodaigh Mòr ====
The island of Flodaigh Mòr of the shore at the northeastern end of Ronay has no bays.

==== Kirkibost ====
The tidal island of Kirkibost, located within the coast in the south-west corner of North Uist, has no bays.

==== Oronsay ====
The tidal islands of Oronsay, located in the north coast North Uist has no bays.

==== Ronay ====
Name	County	Nearest Town	Coordinates	Image	Notes
Acairseid Fhalaich	Inverness-shire		57°29′50″N 7°10′08″W		
Bàgh an Eireannach	Inverness-shire		57°29′37″N 7°09′43″W		
Bàgh Clann Nèill	Inverness-shire		57°29′00″N 7°11′49″W		
Bàgh na Caiplich	Inverness-shire		57°29′18″N 7°10′11″W		
Bàgh nan Uamh	Inverness-shire		57°30′00″N 7°11′48″W		
Bàgh Rubha Chnaip	Inverness-shire		57°29′17″N 7°12′16″W		
Camas Mòr	Inverness-shire		57°28′19″N 7°11′10″W		

==== Shillay ====
The small island of Shillay has no bays.

==== Vallay ====
Name	County	Nearest Town	Coordinates	Image	Notes
Bàgh Clann Neill	Inverness-shire	Sollas	57°39′21″N 7°26′08″W		
Bàgh nan Craobhag	Inverness-shire	Sollas	57°39′56″N 7°24′58″W		
Camas na Crìche	Inverness-shire	Sollas	57°39′41″N 7°25′52″W		
Camas Mòr	Inverness-shire	Sollas	57°39′45″N 7°26′07″W		

=== South Uist ===
Name	County	Nearest Town	Coordinates	Image	Notes
Bàgh nam Faoileann	Inverness-shire	Iochdar	57°22′20″N 7°16′12″W		
Bàgh Holmair	Inverness-shire	Iochdar	57°21′41″N 7°15′58″W		
Bàgh nan Toll	Inverness-shire	Iochdar	57°20′32″N 7°15′30″W		
Bàgh Clann Alasdair	Inverness-shire		57°20′20″N 7°13′38″W		
Bàgh a' Mhanaich	Inverness-shire	Iochdar	57°19′59″N 7°15′28″W		
Bàgh a' Ghlinn Mhòir	Inverness-shire		57°12′36″N 7°16′09″W		
Bun an Amair	Inverness-shire		57°12′17″N 7°15′43″W		
Bàgh na Cairidh Mòire	Inverness-shire		57°11′42″N 7°15′53″W		
Camas Sliginis	Inverness-shire		57°11′13″N 7°15′24″W		
Bàgh Dubh	Inverness-shire		57°09′05″N 7°18′26″W		
Bàgh Mile-Feala	Inverness-shire		57°17′39″N 7°11′56″W		
Bàgh Abhainn Aon-uillt	Inverness-shire		57°16′39″N 7°13′46″W		
Bàgh a Tuath	Inverness-shire		57°23′34″N 7°24′38″W		
Bàgh Uisinis	Inverness-shire		57°16′49″N 7°13′29″W		
Bàgh Lamasaigh	Inverness-shire		57°16′21″N 7°14′07″W		
Bàgh Choradail	Inverness-shire		57°15′35″N 7°14′54″W		
Bàgh Bholuim	Inverness-shire		57°14′01″N 7°15′33″W		
Bàgh a' Ghlinn Mhòir	Inverness-shire		57°12′36″N 7°16′09″W		
Bàgh Marulaigh	Inverness-shire		57°07′45″N 7°14′49″W		
Hairteabhagh	Inverness-shire		57°07′27″N 7°14′17″W		
Bàgh Shaltabhaig	Inverness-shire		57°06′11″N 7°19′22″W		
Cròic a Deas	Inverness-shire		57°14′08″N 7°26′14″W		
Cròic a Tuath	Inverness-shire		57°14′33″N 7°26′27″W		
Usinish Bay	Inverness-shire		57°16′49″N 7°13′33″W		

==== Calbhaigh ====
The small islands of Calbhaigh, that contains the remains of Calvay Castle has no bays.

==== Eileanan Iasgaich ====
Name	County	Nearest Town	Coordinates	Image	Notes
Bàgh Mhic Rois	Inverness-shire	Lochboisdale	57°08′34″N 7°18′36″W		

==== Stuley ====
The small offshore island of Stuley (Gaelic:Stulaigh) has no bays

== See also ==
- List of bays of the Firth of Clyde
- List of bays of Scotland
- List of bays of the Inner Hebrides
- List of bays of the Orkney Islands
- List of bays of the Shetland Islands
