= List of bays of the Firth of Clyde =

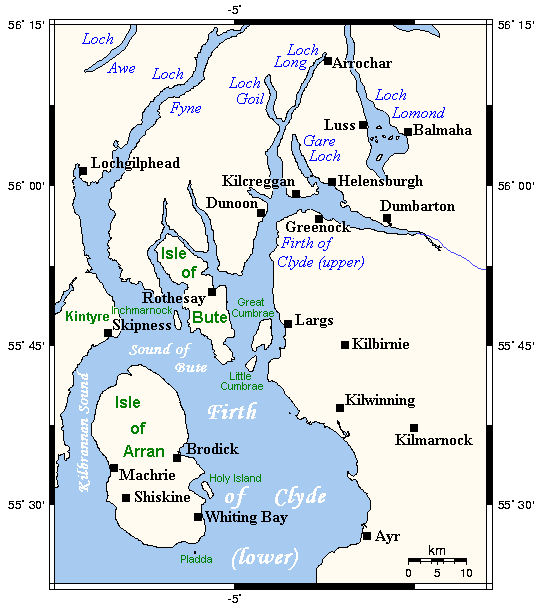
Map of Firth of Clyde

This List of bays of the Firth of Clyde summarises the bays that are located in the islands of the Firth of Clyde in Scotland

== Arran ==
| Name | County | Nearest Town | Coordinates | Image | Notes |
|---|---|---|---|---|---|
| Brodick Bay | North Ayrshire | Brodick | 55°34′16″N 5°06′23″W | | |
| Catacol Bay | North Ayrshire | Lochranza | 55°41′23″N 5°19′57″W | | |
| Drumadoon Bay | North Ayrshire | Blackwaterfoot | 55°29′48″N 5°20′29″W | | |
| Kerr's Port | North Ayrshire | Lamlash | 55°32′53″N 5°05′27″W | | |
| Lamlash Bay | North Ayrshire | Lamlash | 55°31′51″N 5°06′13″W | | |
| Machrie Bay | North Ayrshire | Machrie | 55°33′18″N 5°21′11″W | | |
| Port a' Ghille Ghlais | North Ayrshire | Whiting Bay | 55°26′21″N 5°09′13″W | | |
| Port Dearg | North Ayrshire | Whiting Bay | 55°26′22″N 5°06′55″W | | |
| Port na Feannaiche | North Ayrshire | Lagg | 55°27′23″N 5°17′32″W | | |
| Port Mòr | North Ayrshire | Blackwaterfoot | 55°26′45″N 5°15′50″W | | |
| Port Mòr | North Ayrshire | Whiting Bay | 55°28′54″N 5°05′23″W | | |
| Porta Buidhe | North Ayrshire | Lagg, Arran | 55°26′27″N 5°07′26″W | | |
| Porta Leacach | North Ayrshire | Kildonan | 55°26′57″N 5°05′34″W | | |
| Sannox Bay | North Ayrshire | Sannox | 55°39′38″N 5°08′56″W | | |
| Whiting Bay | North Ayrshire | Whiting Bay | 55°29′03″N 5°04′52″W | | |

== Bute ==
| Name | County | Nearest Town | Coordinates | Image | Notes |
|---|---|---|---|---|---|
| Ascog Bay | Argyll and Bute | Rothesay | 55°49′37″N 5°01′24″W | | |
| Balnakailly Bay | Argyll and Bute | Rothesay | 55°55′21″N 5°10′09″W | | |
| Dunagoil Bay | Argyll and Bute | Rothesay | 55°44′12″N 5°03′12″W | | |
| Ettrick Bay | Argyll and Bute | Rothesay | 55°50′39″N 5°08′30″W | | |
| Gallachan Bay | Argyll and Bute | Rothesay | 55°45′57″N 5°04′42″W | | |
| Glencallum Bay | Argyll and Bute | Rothesay | 55°43′47″N 5°00′25″W | | |
| Kames Bay | Argyll and Bute | Rothesay | 55°52′00″N 5°04′53″W | | |
| Kerrycroy Bay | Argyll and Bute | Rothesay | 55°48′35″N 5°01′16″W | | |
| Kerrylamont Bay | Argyll and Bute | Rothesay | 55°46′39″N 5°00′15″W | | |
| Kilchattan Bay | Argyll and Bute | Rothesay | 55°45′22″N 5°01′23″W | | |
| Lubas Bay | Argyll and Bute | Rothesay | 55°44′36″N 5°03′28″W | | |
| Port na h-Aille | Argyll and Bute | Rothesay | 55°46′40″N 5°07′21″W | | |
| Rothesay Bay | Argyll and Bute | Rothesay | 55°50′42″N 5°01′40″W | | |
| Scalpsie Bay | Argyll and Bute | Rothesay | 55°46′32″N 5°06′11″W | | |
| Sallan Port | Argyll and Bute | Rothesay | 55°47′41″N 5°07′38″W | | |
| St Ninian's Bay | Argyll and Bute | Rothesay | 55°48′18″N 5°07′48″W | | |
| Stravanan Bay | Argyll and Bute | Rothesay | 55°45′32″N 5°04′02″W | | |

== Davaar ==
The small island of Davaar has no bays.

== Great Cumbrae ==
| Name | County | Nearest Town | Coordinates | Image | Notes |
|---|---|---|---|---|---|
| Ballochmartin Bay | North Ayrshire | Millport | 55°46′22″N 4°53′54″W | | |
| Bell Bay | North Ayrshire | Millport | 55°46′39″N 4°55′57″W | | |
| Deadman's Bay | North Ayrshire | Millport | 55°45′47″N 4°56′41″W | | |
| Fintray Bay | North Ayrshire | Millport | 55°46′08″N 4°56′18″W | | |
| Holm Bay | North Ayrshire | Millport | 55°47′22″N 4°53′52″W | | |
| Kames Bay | North Ayrshire | Millport | 55°45′08″N 4°55′02″W | | |
| Lady's Bay | North Ayrshire | Millport | 55°47′25″N 4°53′52″W | | |
| Knox's Port | North Ayrshire | Millport | 55°45′00″N 4°55′57″W | | |
| Millport Bay | North Ayrshire | Millport | 55°44′54″N 4°55′34″W | | |
| Newtown Bay | North Ayrshire | Millport | 55°45′06″N 4°55′40″W | | |
| Skate Bay | North Ayrshire | Millport | 55°47′07″N 4°55′42″W | | |
| Stinking Bay | North Ayrshire | Millport | 55°47′29″N 4°55′05″W | | |
| White Bay | North Ayrshire | Millport | 55°47′31″N 4°54′32″W | | |
| Wine Bay | North Ayrshire | Millport | 55°47′28″N 4°55′03″W | | |

== Holy Island ==
The small island of Holy Island has no bays.

== Inchmarnock ==
The small island of Inchmarnock has no bays.

== Little Cumbrae ==
| Name | County | Nearest Town | Coordinates | Image | Notes |
|---|---|---|---|---|---|
| Long Bay | North Ayrshire | West Kilbride | 55°43′52″N 4°57′02″W | | |
| Steadholm Bay | North Ayrshire | West Kilbride | 55°42′59″N 4°57′54″W | | |
| Waterloo Bay | North Ayrshire | West Kilbride | 55°42′45″N 4°57′34″W | | |

== Sanda ==
The small island of Sanda has no bays.

== See also ==
- List of bays of Scotland
- List of bays of the Inner Hebrides
- List of bays of the Orkney Islands
- List of bays of the Shetland Islands
