= St. Peter's Pool =

St. Peter's Pool may refer to:

- St. Peter's Pool (Malta), a small bay on the island of Malta
- St. Peter's Pool (Scotland), a bay on the Orkney Mainland in Scotland
