= Glendale, Skye =

Coordinates: 57.447593°N 6.710770°W

Glendale: Scottish Gaelic: Gleann Dail
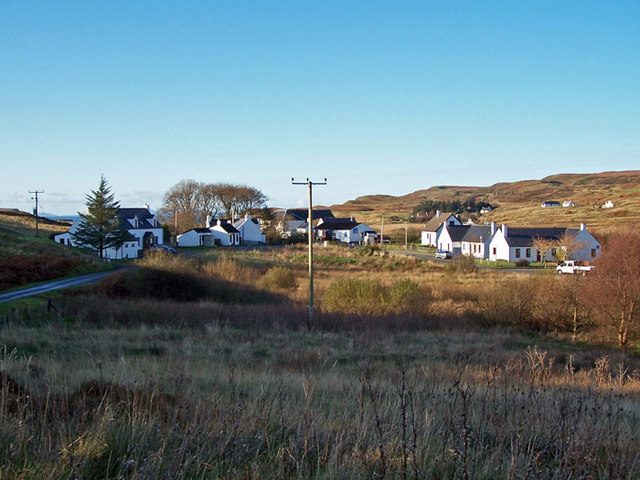
- Glendale

- Location within the Isle of Skye
- OS grid reference: NG175495
- Council area: Highland
- Country: Scotland
- Sovereign state: United Kingdom
- Postcode district: IV55 8
- Police: Scotland
- Fire: Scottish
- Ambulance: Scottish

Glendale (Scottish Gaelic: Gleann Dail) is a community-owned estate on the north-western coastline of the Duirinish peninsula on the island of Skye and is in the Scottish council area of Highland. The estate encompasses the small crofting townships of Skinidin, Colbost, Fasach, Glasphein, Holmisdale, Lephin, Hamaraverin, Borrodale, Milovaig, Waterstein, Feriniquarrie, Totaig, Hamara, and others.

== Etymology ==
Gleann Dail (anglicised as Glendale) is a tautological place name meaning "glen of Dail", where Dail represents the Norse word dalr, meaning "valley".

== Geography ==
The crofts are strung out along a small strath of oolitic loam, which is the basis for the good quality of the farming land. The hills above are underlain by basalt, which also provides good grazing for cattle and sheep.

== History ==
During the unsettled times of the late nineteenth century, when the local crofters sought land reform, this area played an important part in the struggle. After the Battle of the Braes in 1882, the unrest spread to Glendale.

The landlords refused to allow the local population to collect wood from the shore for heating, and they had to use straw to thatch the houses as they were forbidden to cut rushes. Land was in short supply as the holdings had been sub-divided 40 years earlier to provide for those cleared from better land.

Led by John MacPherson, the crofters demanded the return of the common grazing land that had been taken from them. Taking direct action, they began grazing their cattle on this land, court orders for their removal notwithstanding. Police action in January 1883 proved ineffective and eventually a government official was sent to Skye on board the navy gunboat HMS Jackal to conduct negotiations. Five crofters including MacPherson agreed to stand in a token trial. They were sentenced to two months in jail and became known as the "Glendale martyrs", and are commemorated by a memorial in the village. It was also agreed that a royal commission, which became the Napier Commission, would be set up to investigate the crofters' grievances, which eventually resulted in the far-reaching Crofters' Holdings (Scotland) Act 1886.

Historian Neil Oliver stated that "what happened in Glendale was a hugely significant part of what was going on in the Highlands. The events that unfolded there were extraordinary. For communities to remember and teach the wider community about their own history is terrific".

In July 2010 there was a homecoming of the Glendale diaspora during which local man Iain MacPherson blew the horn once used by his great-grandfather John.

== See also ==
- Highland Land League
- Battle of Glendale (Skye), a battle fought near Glendale, by combined forces of MacDonalds and MacLeods
