= Eilean an Ròin Mòr =

Island in Sutherland, Scotland

Eilean an Ròin Mòr (Gaelic)
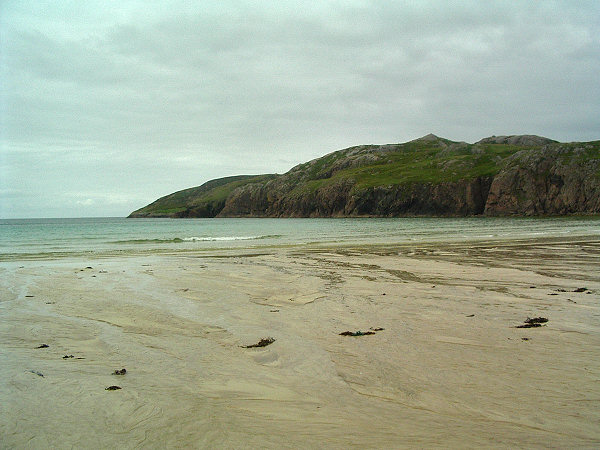

Location
- En an Ròin Mòr shown within Highland Scotland
- OS grid reference: NC177584
- Coordinates: 58.476°N 5.127°W

Name
- Name meaning: large seal island

Physical geography
- Island group: Highland / Islands of Sutherland
- Area: 33 hectares (0.13 sq mi)
- Highest elevation: 63 metres (207 ft)

Administration
- Council area: Highland
- Country: Scotland
- Sovereign state: United Kingdom

Demographics
- Population: 0

Eilean an Ròin Mòr is an uninhabited island in north west Sutherland.

== Geography ==
Eilean an Ròin Mòr, with its neighbour, Eilean an Ròin Beag, forms rocky peninsula to the north of Oldshoremore beach. Only a narrow channel separates it from the mainland.

The rocky island has little vegetation.
