= Milovaig =

Coordinates: 57.45155°N 6.74436°W

Milovaig: Scottish Gaelic: Mìolabhaig
- Location within the Isle of Skye
- OS grid reference: NG155500
- Council area: Highland
- Country: Scotland
- Sovereign state: United Kingdom
- Post town: Glendale
- Postcode district: IV55 8
- Police: Scotland
- Fire: Scottish
- Ambulance: Scottish

Milovaig (Scottish Gaelic: Mìolabhaig), comprises two small scattered, mixed crofting and residential townships, consisting of Lower Milovaig to the North and Upper Milovaig to the South, situated on the south shore of Loch Pooltiel on the Duirinish peninsula, on the Isle of Skye, in the Highlands of Scotland. It is in the Scottish council area of Highland.

It is part of the Glendale estate. The township of Lower Milovaig is divided into 17 crofts, each with a full share in Glendale Estate and a share of the 689-acre (279-hectare) township common grazings. The souming for each full holding is 3 cows, with calves, and 11 sheep. The township of Upper Milovaig is divided into 16 crofts, each with a full share in Glendale Estate and a share of the 747-acre (302-hectare) township common grazings. The souming for each holding is 2 cows, 1 two-year-old and 15 sheep.

== Gallery ==
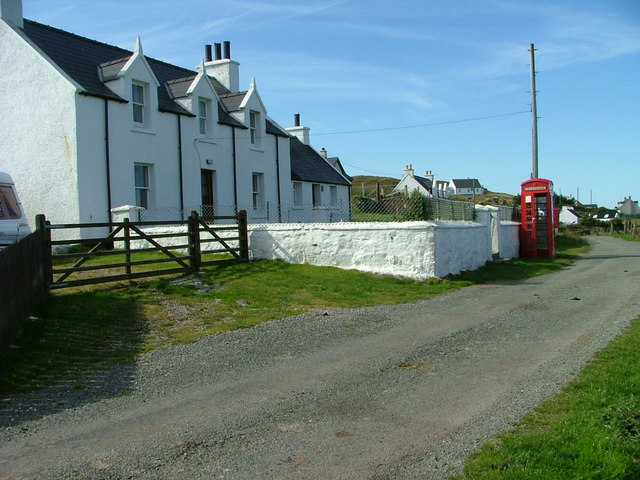
Milovaig

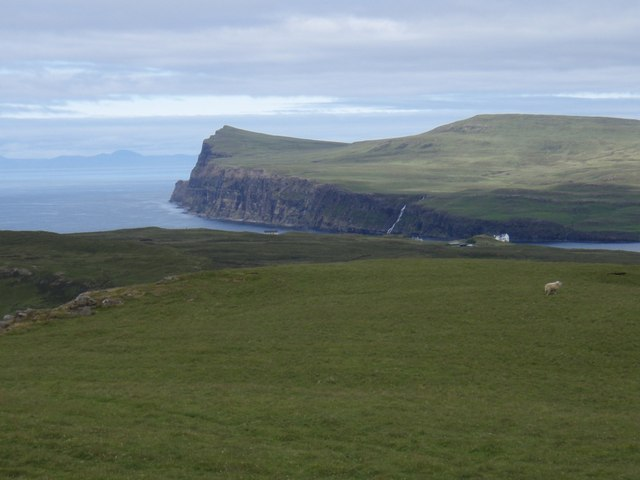
Lower Milovaig Can and the cliffs on the other side of Loch Pooltiel

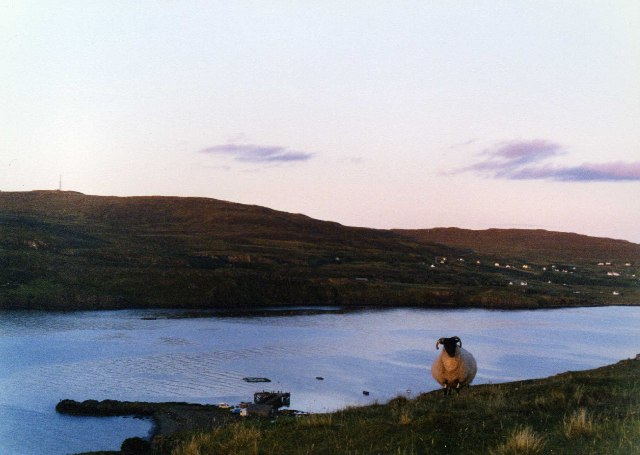
Meanish Pier

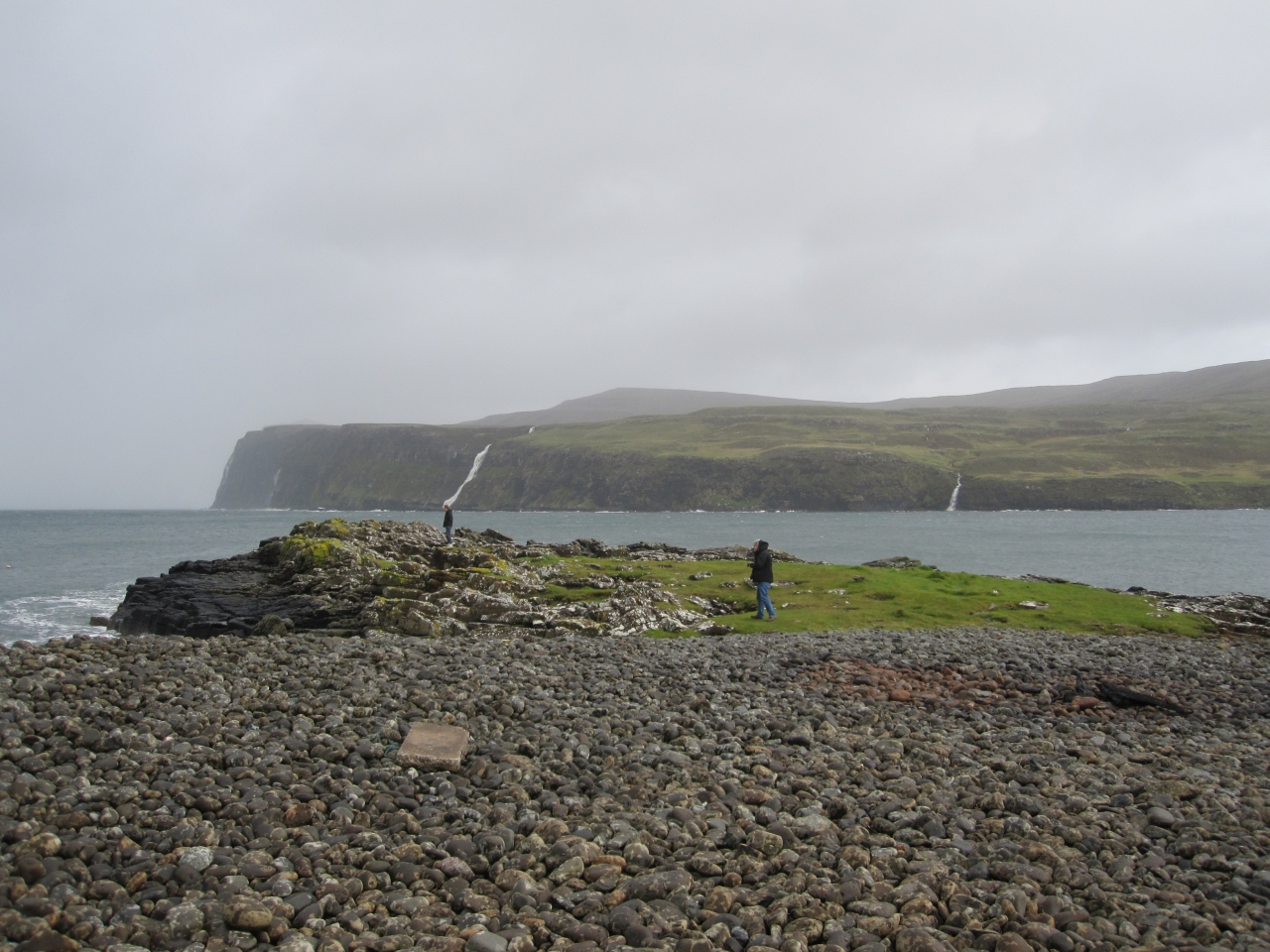
Another view of Milovaig

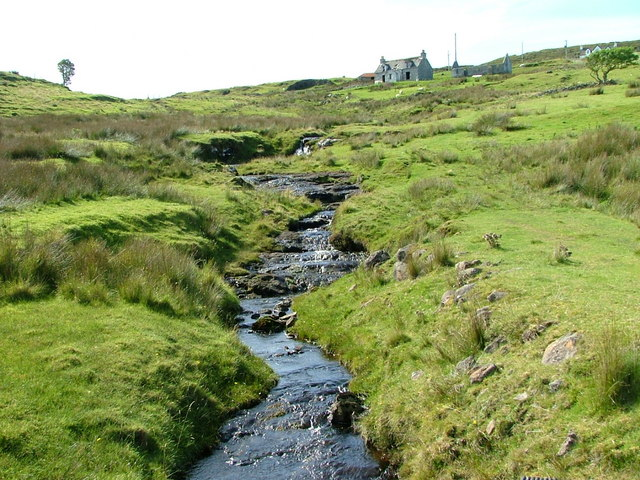
Tiny Burn in Upper Milovaig
