= HMS Jackal =

Eight ships of the Royal Navy have borne the name HMS Jackal (or Jackall), after the predatory mammal, the jackal:

- HMS Jackal (1778) was a 10-gun cutter purchased in 1778 and sold in 1785.
- HMS Jackal (1779) was a 14-gun cutter purchased in 1779. Later in 1779 eighteen Irish men of her crew mutinied and sailed her to Calais where they sold her for £3,000. She became the French privateer Jackall, Chacal, or Boulogne. HMS Prudente recaptured Boullongue on 22 July 1781. She became a privateer. Jackall was captured again in 1782 by USS Deane.
- HMS Jackal (1792) was a 10-gun brig. She was a purchased vessel in service in 1792.
- HMS Jackal (1801) was a 12-gun gun-brig launched in 1801 and wrecked on the French coast in 1807; crew taken into captivity.
- HMS Jackal (1844) was an iron paddle gunvessel launched in 1844 and sold in 1887.
- HMS Jackal was a fishery protection vessel purchased in 1885 as HMS Woodcock. She was renamed HMS Jackal in 1886 and was sold in 1906.
- HMS Jackal (1911) was an Acheron-class destroyer launched in 1911 and sold in 1920.
- HMS Jackal (F22) was a J-class destroyer launched in 1938 and sunk in 1942.
