= Catacol Bay =

Embayment within the council area of North Ayrshire in Scotland

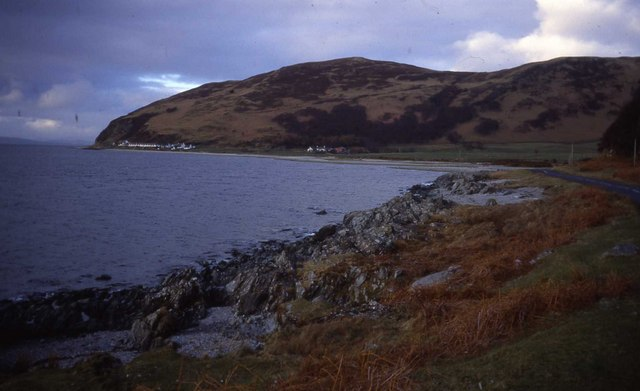
- Shoreline of Catacol bay looking north.

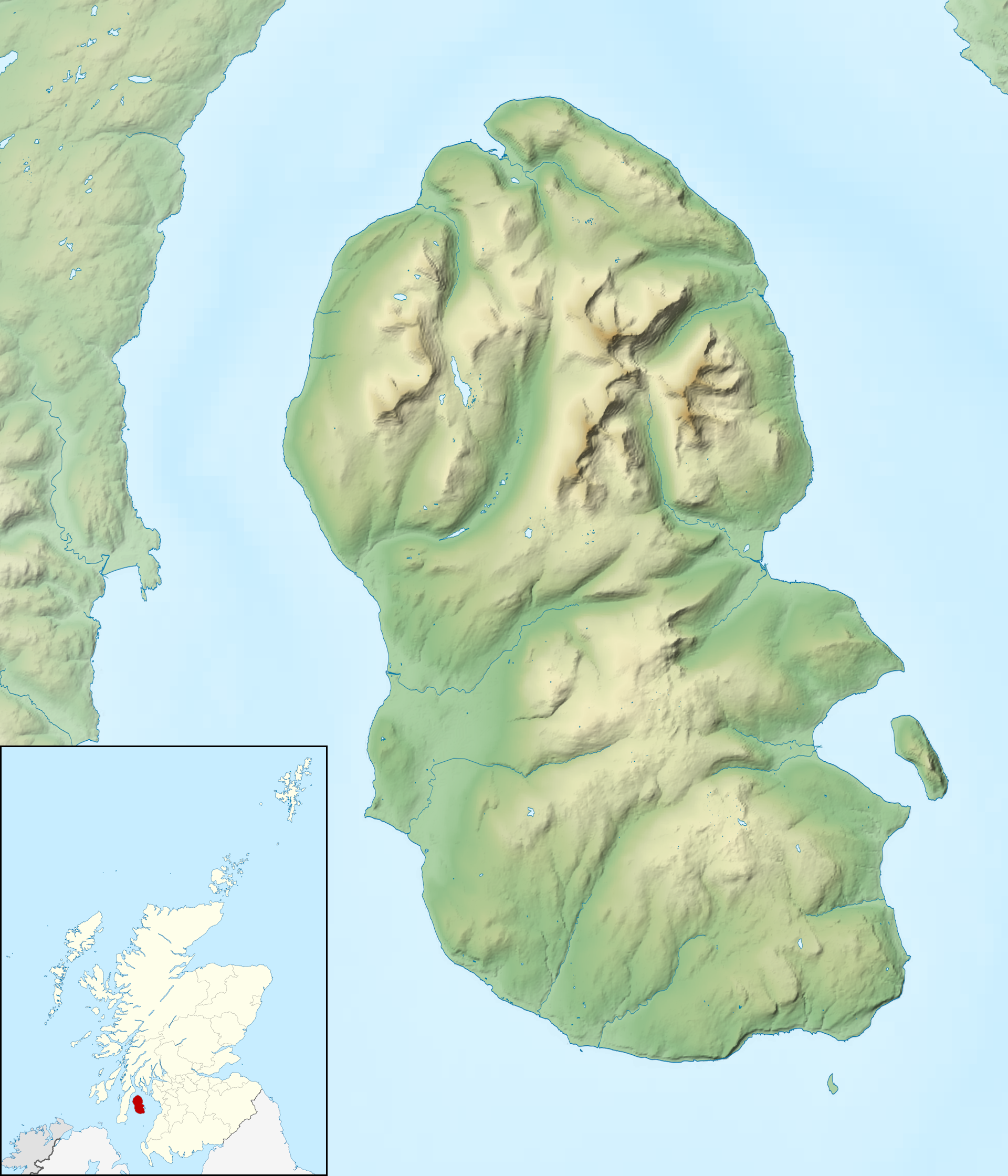
- Location within Arran
- Location: Isle of Arran, North Ayrshire Scotland
- Coordinates: 55°41′26.4012″N 5°19′57.0864″W
- River sources: Glen Catacol
- Ocean/sea sources: Kilbrannan Sound
- Basin countries: Scotland
- Max. length: 1.8 km (1.1 mi)
- Max. width: 0.45 km (0.28 mi)
- Settlements: Catacol

Catacol Bay (Scottish Gaelic: Catagal bhàigh) is a small shallow-curved tidal, 310° facing, rocky coastal embayment located on the northwest tip of the Isle of Arran in the Firth of Clyde, within the council area of North Ayrshire in Scotland.

== Geography ==
The bay faces the Kilbrannan Sound a marine water body that separates the Kintyre Peninsula from the Isle of Arran and offers excellent views of the peninsula. Kilbrannan Sound is the western arm of the Firth of Clyde

Overlooking the bay to the south is the hill Meall nan Damh at 570 metres, which lies above Glen Catacol, and is the northernmost of the Pirnmill Hills. The most picturesque of lochs on Arran is Loch Corrie between Meall nan Damh and the hill of Meal Biorach at 551 metres. South by south east of the bay lies the smaller hill of Meall Mòr at 496 metres.

Behind the bay is Glen Catacol, that is a very steep sided valley made up of granite and basalt, with the Glen Catacol river running down the valley, where it is met by the small stream of Gleann Diohan at the base of the hill Meall nan Leac Sleamhuinn at 272 metres.

Directly to the north of the bay at 1 mile distance, is the sea loch, Loch Ranza. The closest bay south of Catacol bay is Machrie Bay 11.5 miles directly south of Catacol.

== Settlements ==
The Norse name for the tiny village of Catacol itself is The gully of the cat. The village of Catacol has a row of low white terraced cottages called the 'Twelve Apostles'. They were built to house those people cleared from the surrounding countryside, when much of the interior of the island was set aside for deer. The theory was these former farmers would turn to fishing, and with this in mind, each of the twelve cottages had a differently shaped first floor window. This would allow the woman of the house to signal by placing a candle in the window to her husband out while he was out fishing in the Firth of Clyde. The husband would know who was being signalled by the shape of the window. In reality, most of the dispossessed moved away to other parts of the island in protest against their eviction.

Further along the C147 to the north lies the now-closed Catacol Bay Hotel. Directly to the north east of the bay is Lochranza, about 1 mile along the A841 road. Almost 5 miles south west of Catacol along the C147 road, lies the former industrial village and now tourist village of Pirnmill, where pirns were made for the cotton industry from 1780 to 1840.

== Features ==
The Fairy Dell is an ethereal spot where Fairy folk are supposed to dance and is located above Lochranza.

== Gallery ==
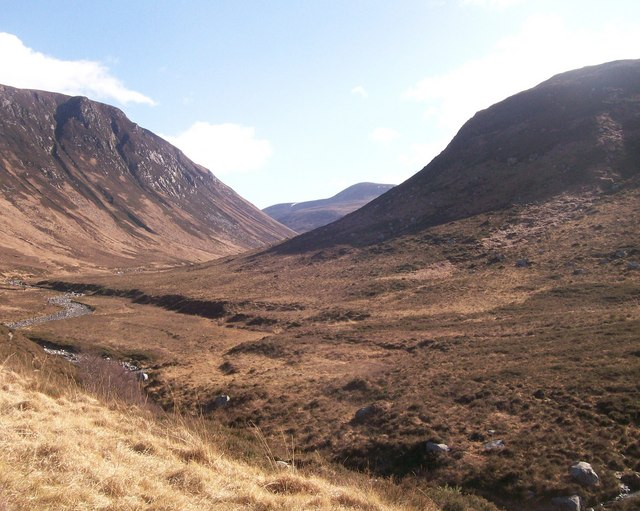
Glen Catacol with Glen Catacol river.

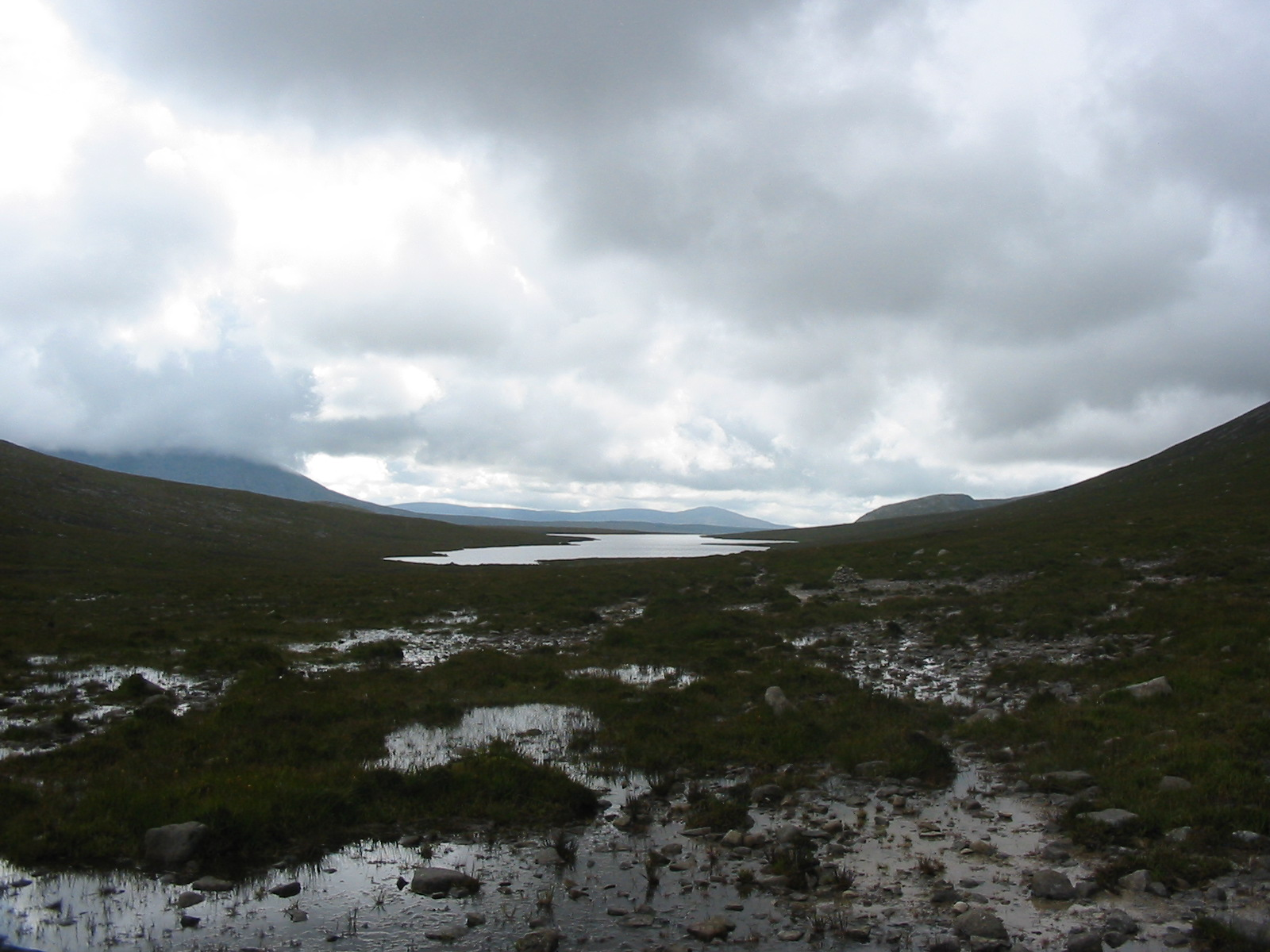
Loch Tanna, seen from Glen Catacol.

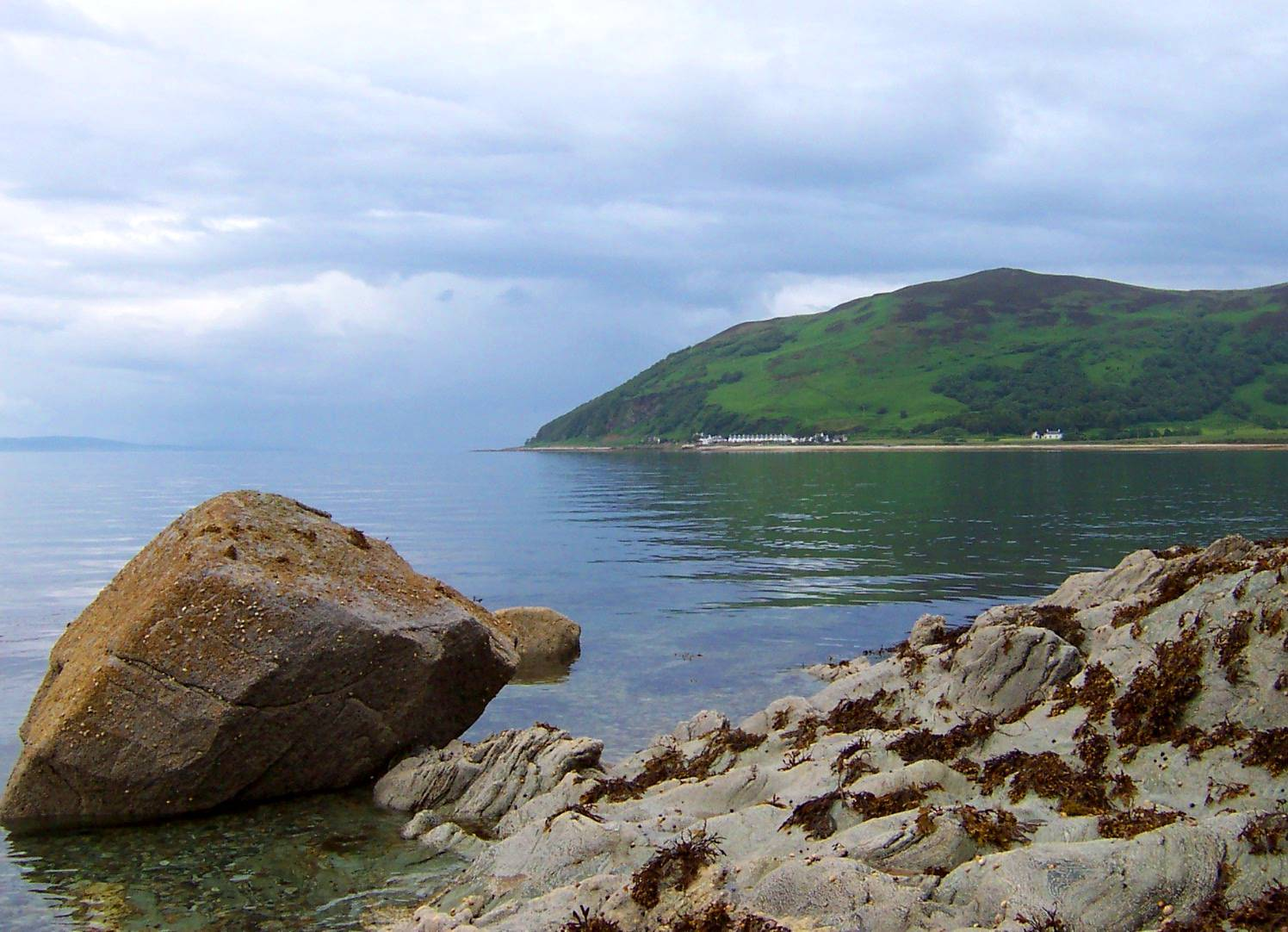
Catacol Bay on a beautiful day.

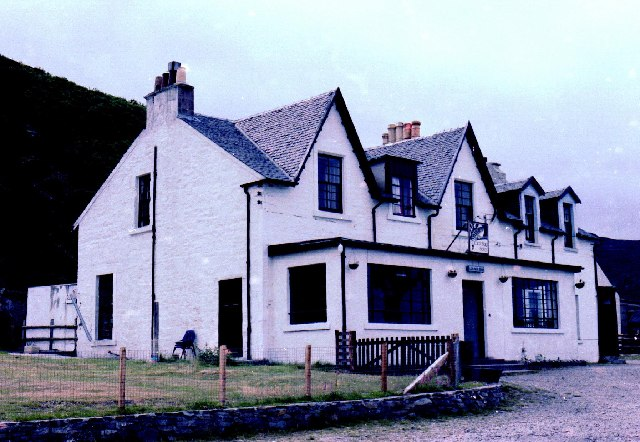
Catacol Bay Hotel

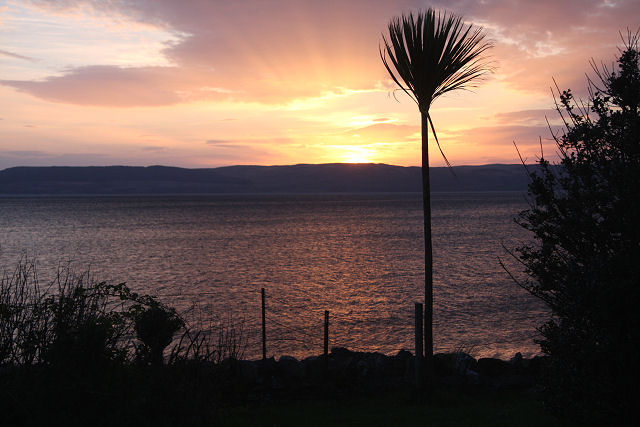
Sunset over Catacol Bay.

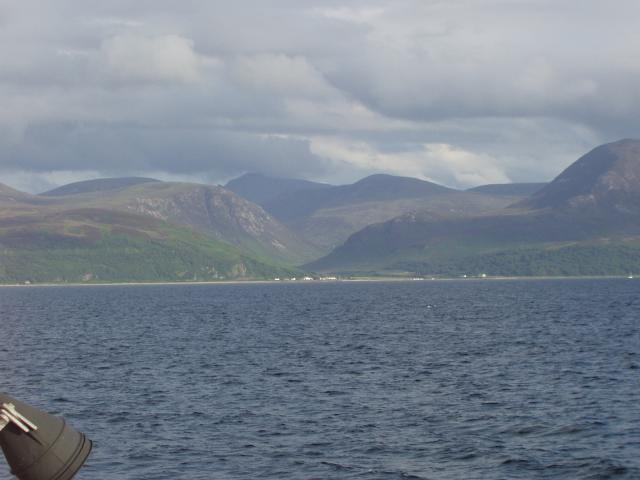
Catacol Bay showing the Glen Catacol, taken from the Lochranza-Claonig Ferry.

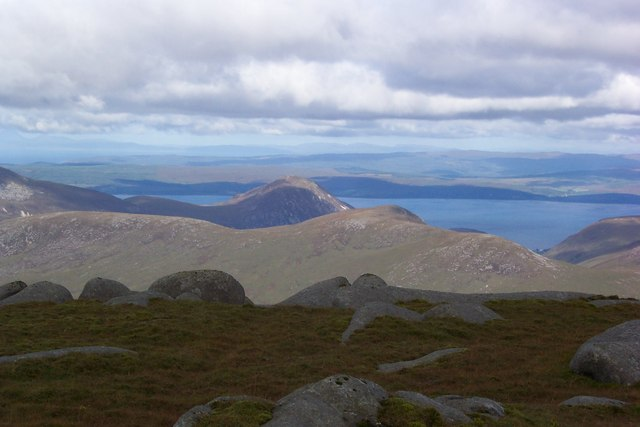
Meall nam Damh

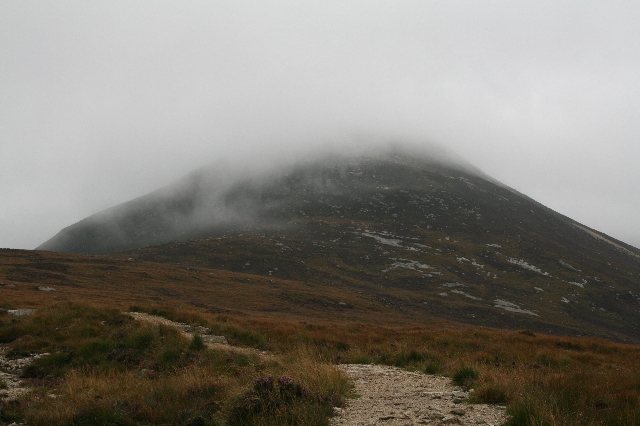
Northern Slopes of Meall Biorach. Looking up from the Coire Fhionn Lochan path.

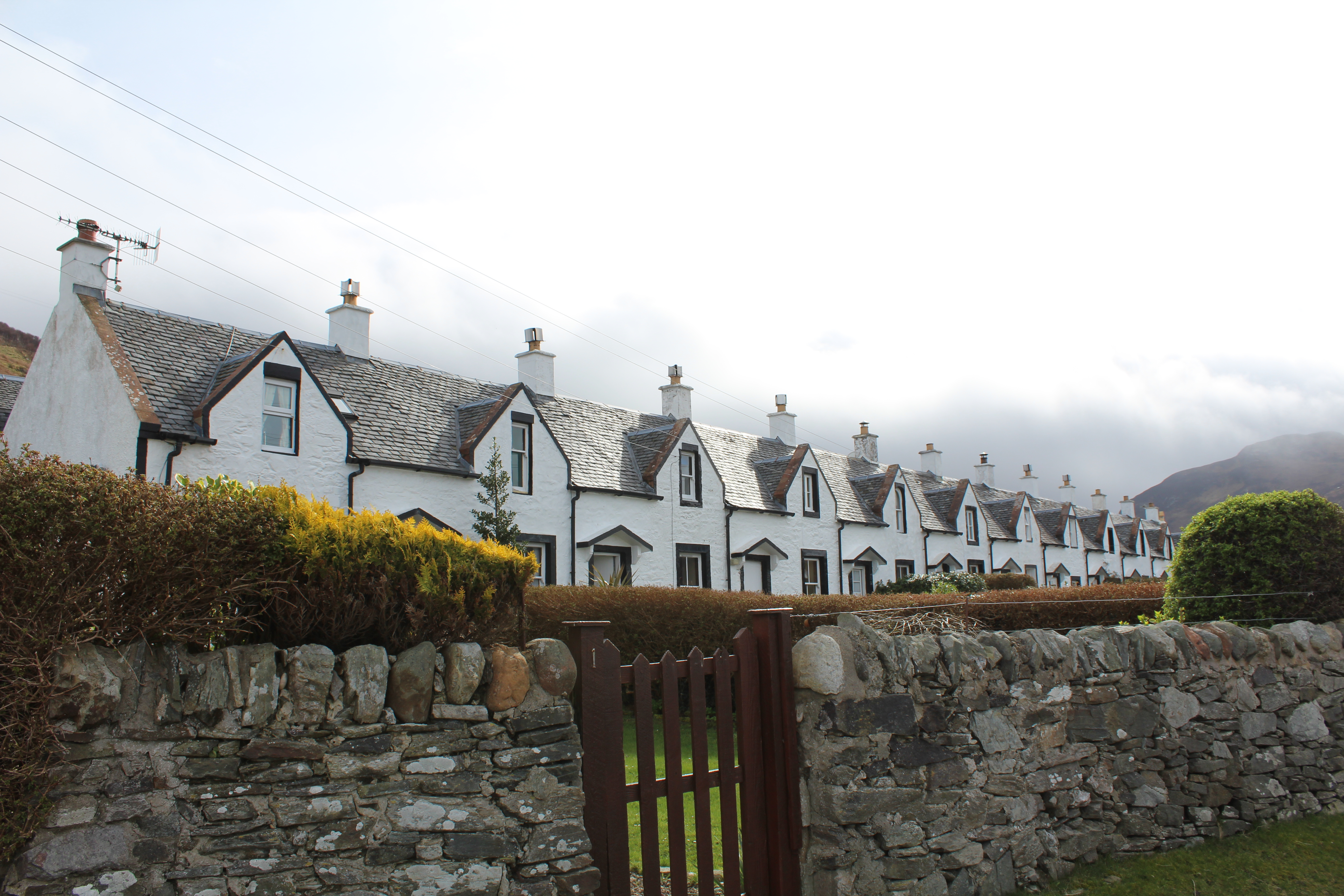
Twelve apostles.

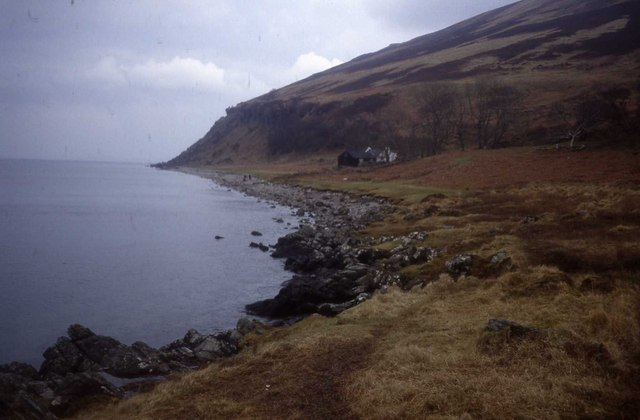
Fairy Dell mouth A lonely house sits on the raised beach at the end of Fairy Dell. Behind, the hillside seems to be tumbling into the sea.

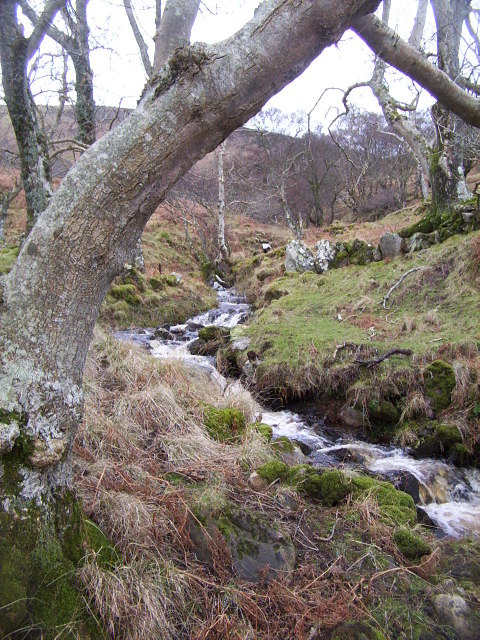
Winter in the Fairy Dell.
