= St Mary's, Orkney =

Coordinates: 58.896°N 2.914°W

St Mary's
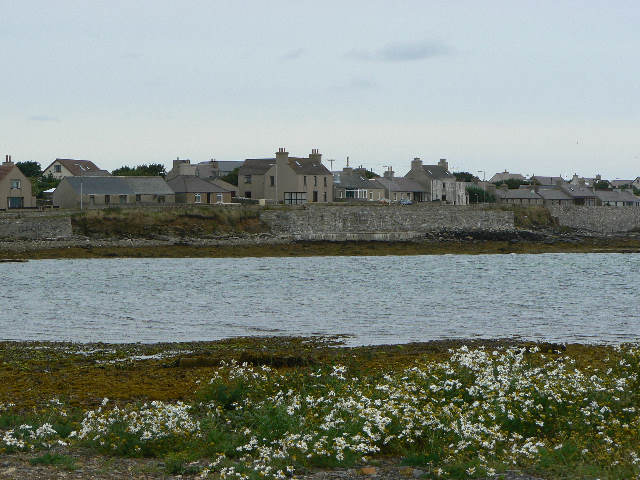
- Viewed from Skaildaquoy Point, and showing the Bay of Ayre with part of the village of St Mary's

- Location within Orkney
- OS grid reference: HY473012
- Civil parish: Holm
- Council area: Orkney
- Lieutenancy area: Orkney
- Country: Scotland
- Sovereign state: United Kingdom
- Post town: ORKNEY
- Postcode district: KW17
- Dialling code: 01856
- Police: Scotland
- Fire: Scottish
- Ambulance: Scottish
- UK Parliament: Orkney and Shetland
- Scottish Parliament: Orkney

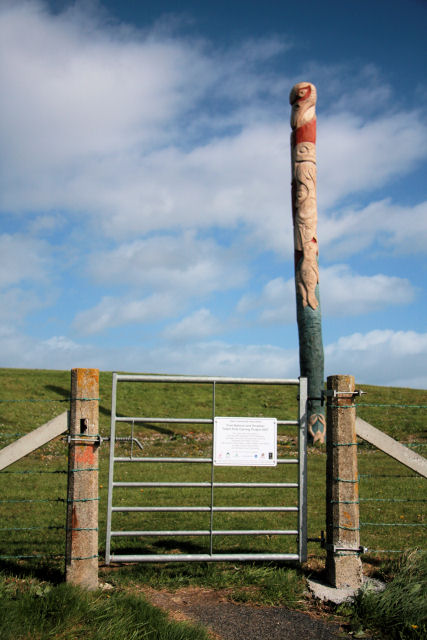
Squamish-Orcadian totem pole, St Mary's

St Mary's (also known as St. Mary's Holm) is a small village in the parish of Holm on Mainland, Orkney, Scotland. It was originally a fishing port.

Orkney F.C., the island group's main football club, plays its home games at The Rockworks Community Park, St. Mary's. Close to the ground, immediately to the north of the northernmost Churchill barrier, is a totem pole, erected as part of a community project in 2007 by local carvers and members of the Squamish First Nation people of western Canada.
