= St Peter's Pool, Orkney =

Bay in the East Mainland of Orkney, Scotland

Coordinates: 58.922°N 2.790°W

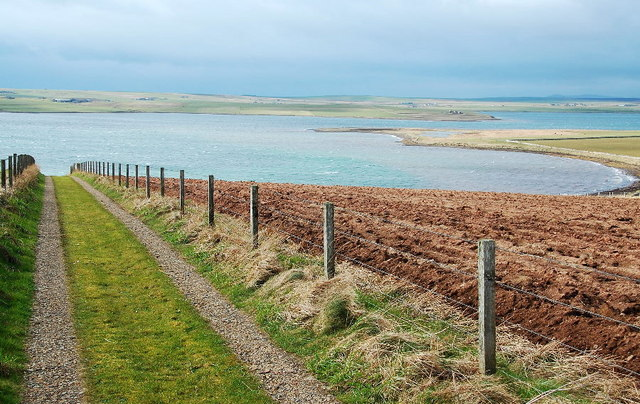

St Peter's Pool is a bay in the East Mainland of Orkney, Scotland. This bay was the site of significant coastal defences during World War II, when a German invasion was anticipated.
