= Port Mòr =

Harbour and settlement on the Isle of Muck off the west coast of Scotland

Coordinates: 56.834°N 6.227°W

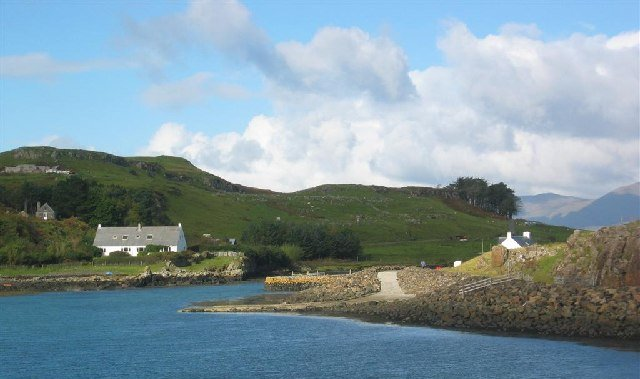
- Port Mòr, from the harbor

- Location within the Highland council area
- Civil parish: Small Isles
- Council area: Highland
- Country: Scotland
- Sovereign state: United Kingdom
- Police: Scotland
- Fire: Scottish
- Ambulance: Scottish

Port Mòr is a harbour and settlement on the island of Muck, in the Inner Hebrides off the west coast of Scotland. It is in the council area of Highland.

Port Mòr is the most populated settlement on the island, currently with around fifteen residents. In 2005, a pier and causeway were built at Port Mòr to allow the ferry to dock on the island. The settlement is the site of the island's first hotel, built by Ewen MacEwen, whose family has owned Muck for over 100 years.
