= Oronsay, Loch Bracadale =

Uninhabited tidal island in Loch Bracadale on the west coast of Skye, Scotland

Coordinates: 57°20′10″N 6°27′36″W

Oronsay
Orasaigh (Gaelic)
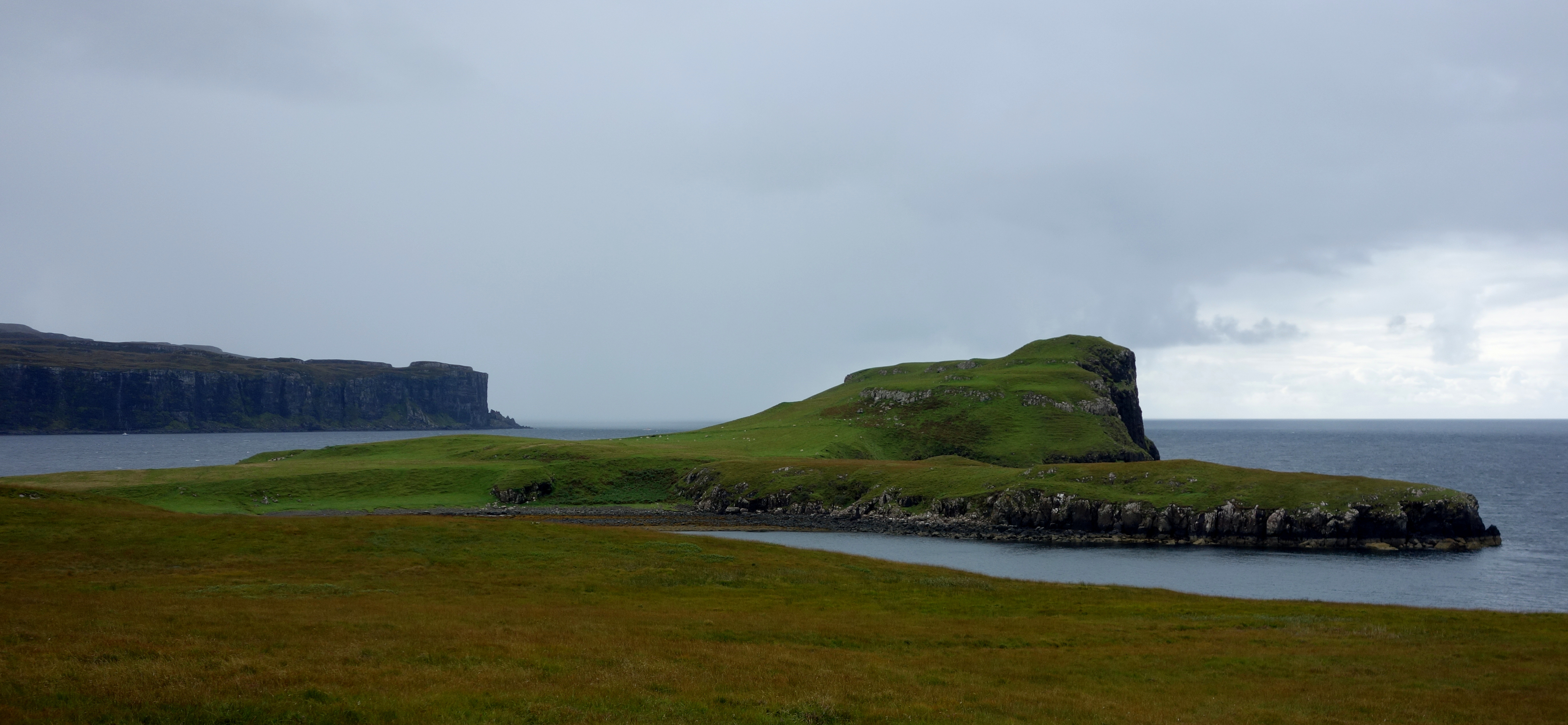
- View of Oronsay from Ullinish Point

Location
- OS grid reference: NG316360

Name
- Name meaning: tidal island
- Old Norse name: Örfirirsey

Physical geography
- Island group: Skye
- Area: 18 hectares (44 acres)
- Highest elevation: 72 metres (236 ft)

Administration
- Council area: Highland
- Country: Scotland
- Sovereign state: United Kingdom

Demographics
- Population: 0
- Largest settlement: none

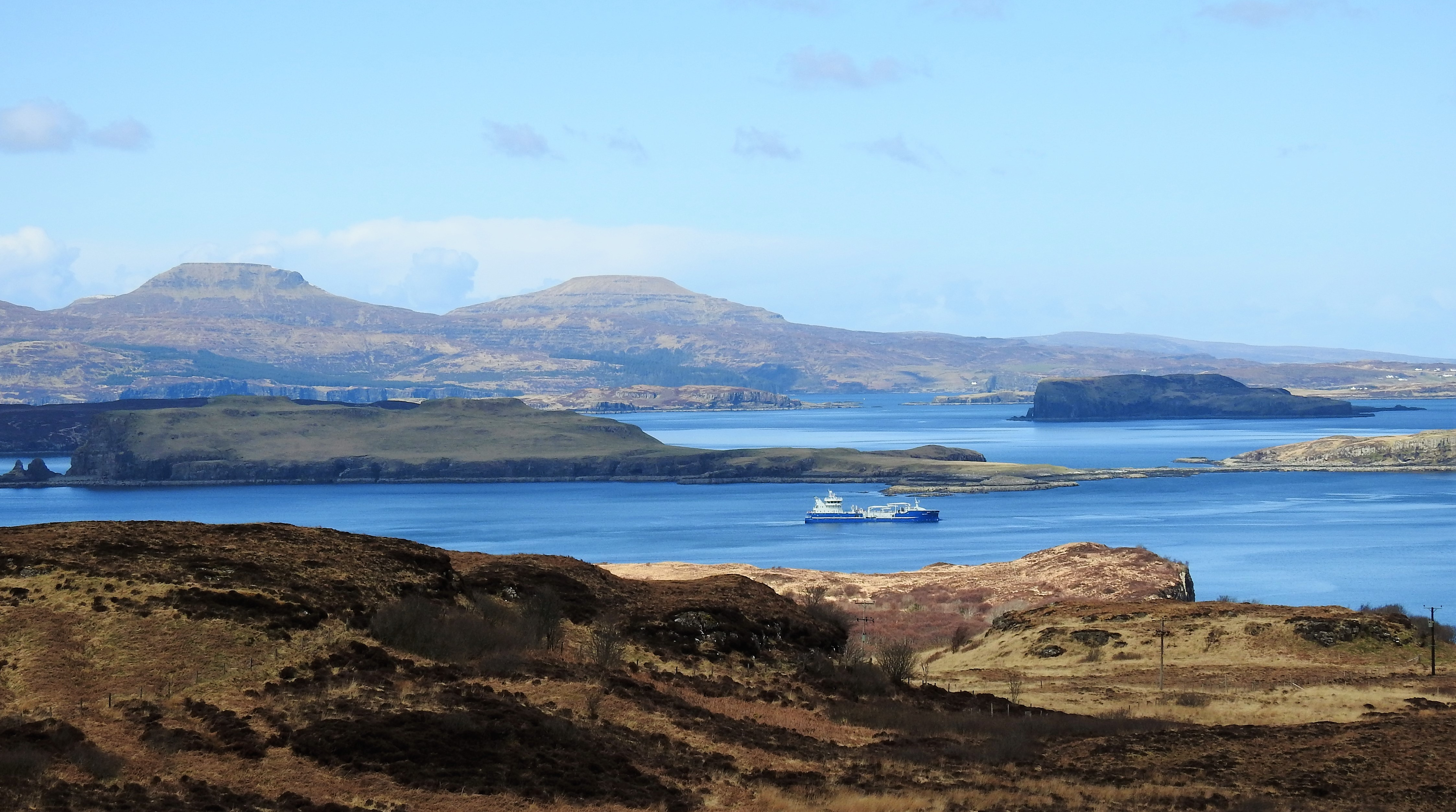
Oronsay (with Tarner Island, Wiay, Harlosh Island and the Duirinish Peninsula.

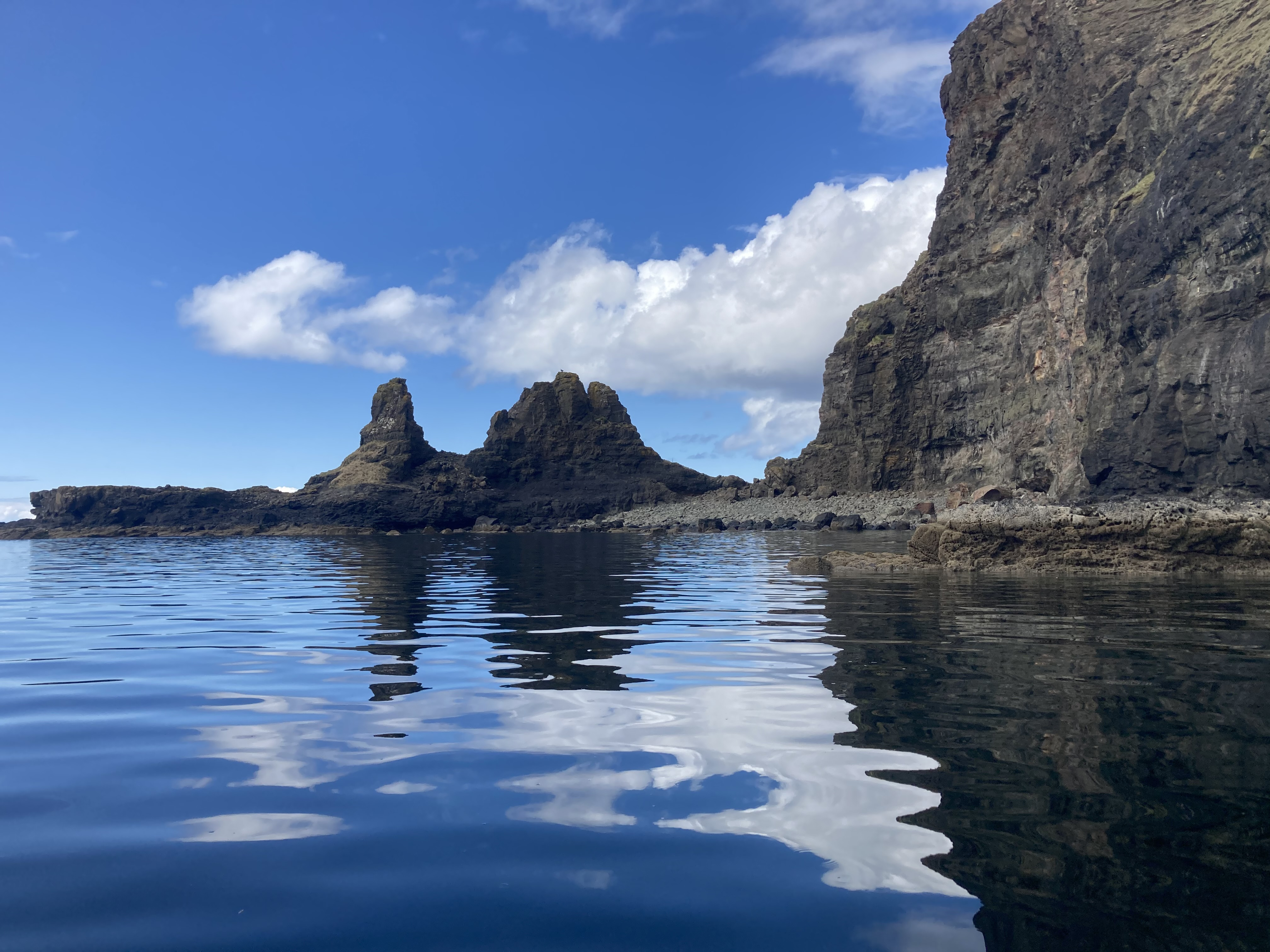

Oronsay (Scottish Gaelic: Orasaigh) is an uninhabited tidal island in Loch Bracadale on the west coast of Skye, Scotland.

It is c.1,000 metres (0.7miles) long by 220m wide running approximately north-east to south west.

At low tide (approx. below 4 metres) the island is connected to Ullinish Point on Skye via a narrow rocky causeway, some 200m long. The name Oronsay is believed to derive from the Old Norse for 'tidal island'.

The eastern part of the island, which faces Skye, is low-lying grass land, while the western part rises until it reaches several cliffs, up to 72 metres (240 ft) in height. Views from the westward side are to the Atlantic, Idrigill Point, Macleod's Maidens, with the much larger island of Wiay c.0.8 miles north-west, behind which the flat tops of Healabhal Bheag and Healabhal Mhòr (Macleod's Tables) dominate from the Duirinish Peninsula.

Behind Wiay some 2.7miles north-west is Harlosh Island (narrowly separated from Harlosh on Skye) and to the east of this, 1.7miles north-west (and directly north of Wiay) is Tarner Island.

Below the westernmost cliff of Oronsay sit several small sea stacks and the coast of the island contains several caves, however these are largely accessible except from the sea.

Oronsay is a well known hiking destination.

== Images of the cliffs of Oronsay ==
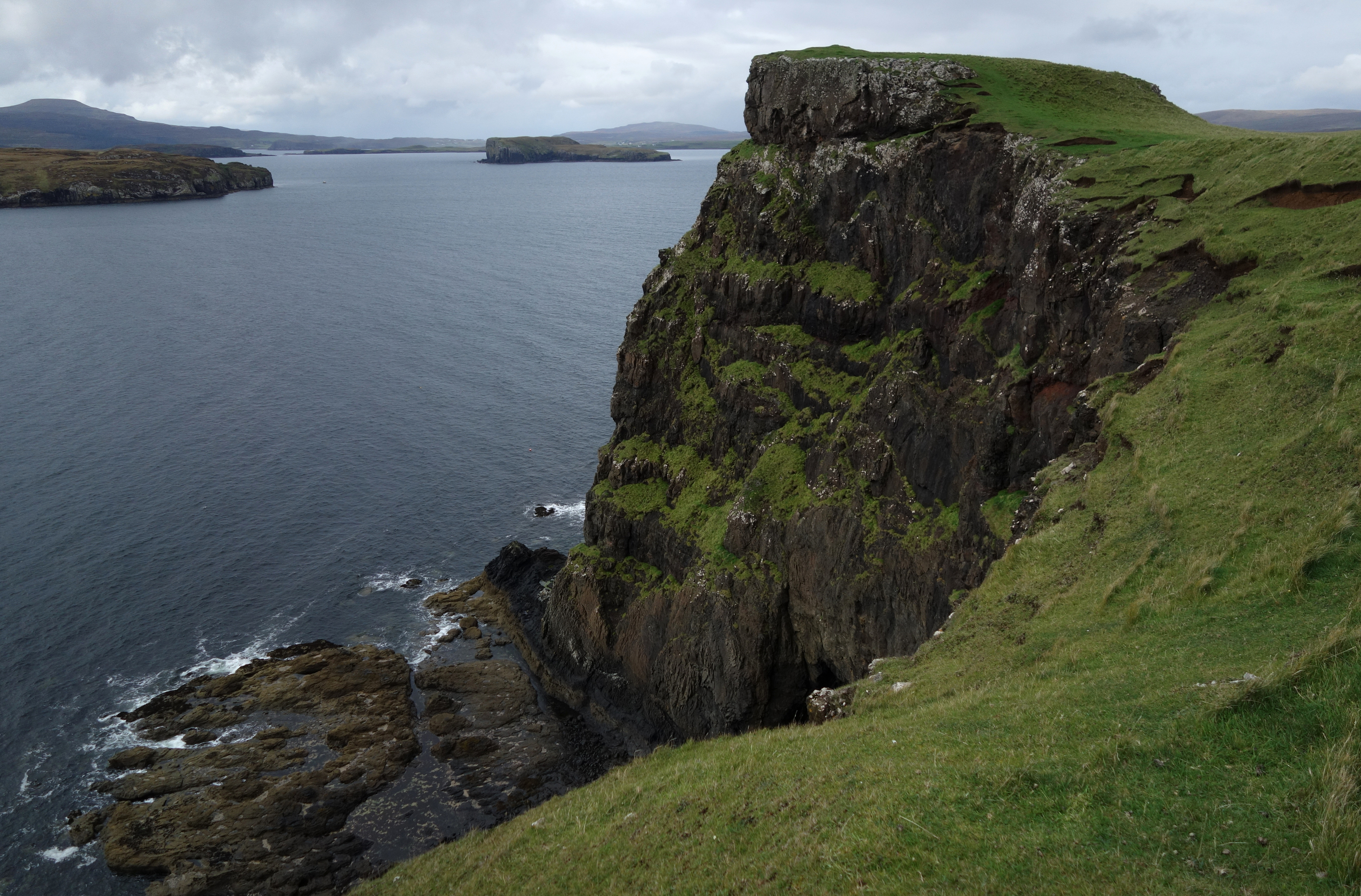
The most westerly point of the island, as viewed from the most southwesterly point, looking north

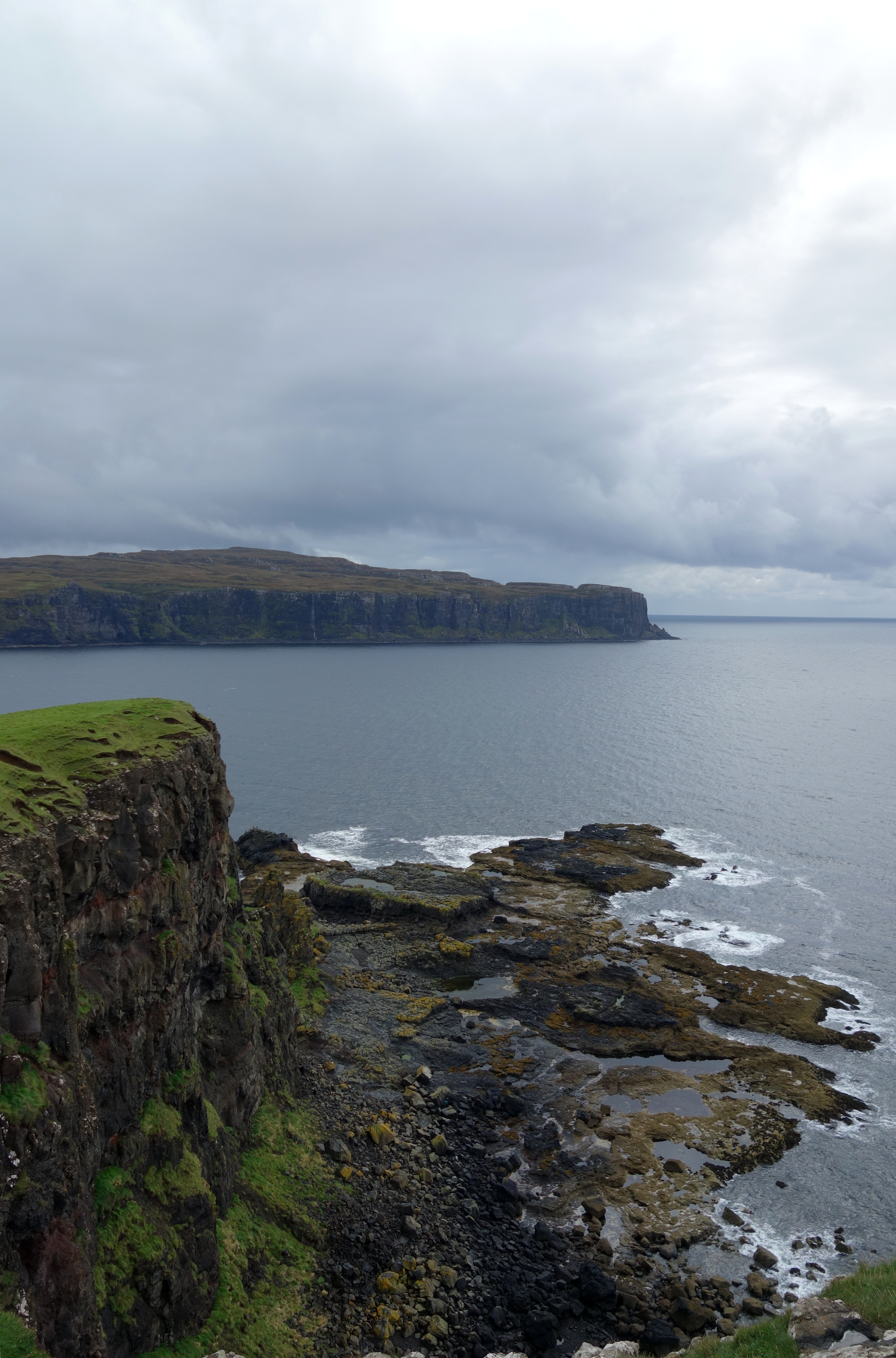
The most southwesterly point of Oronsay, as viewed from the most westerly point, looking south

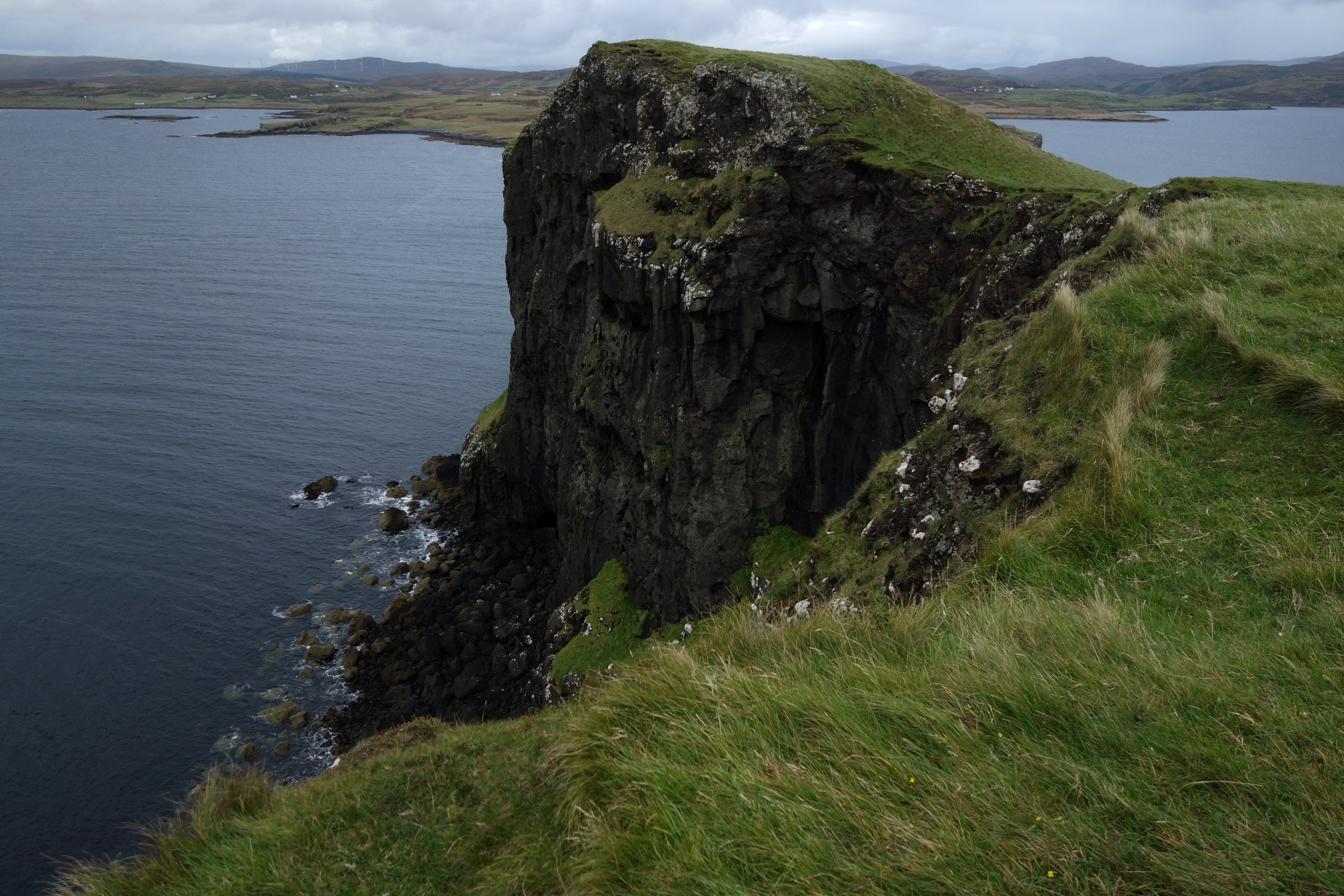
The cliffs along the northwestern side of the island, looking northeast
