= Wiay, Inner Hebrides =

Uninhabited island off the Isle of Skye

Wiay
Fuidheigh (Gaelic)
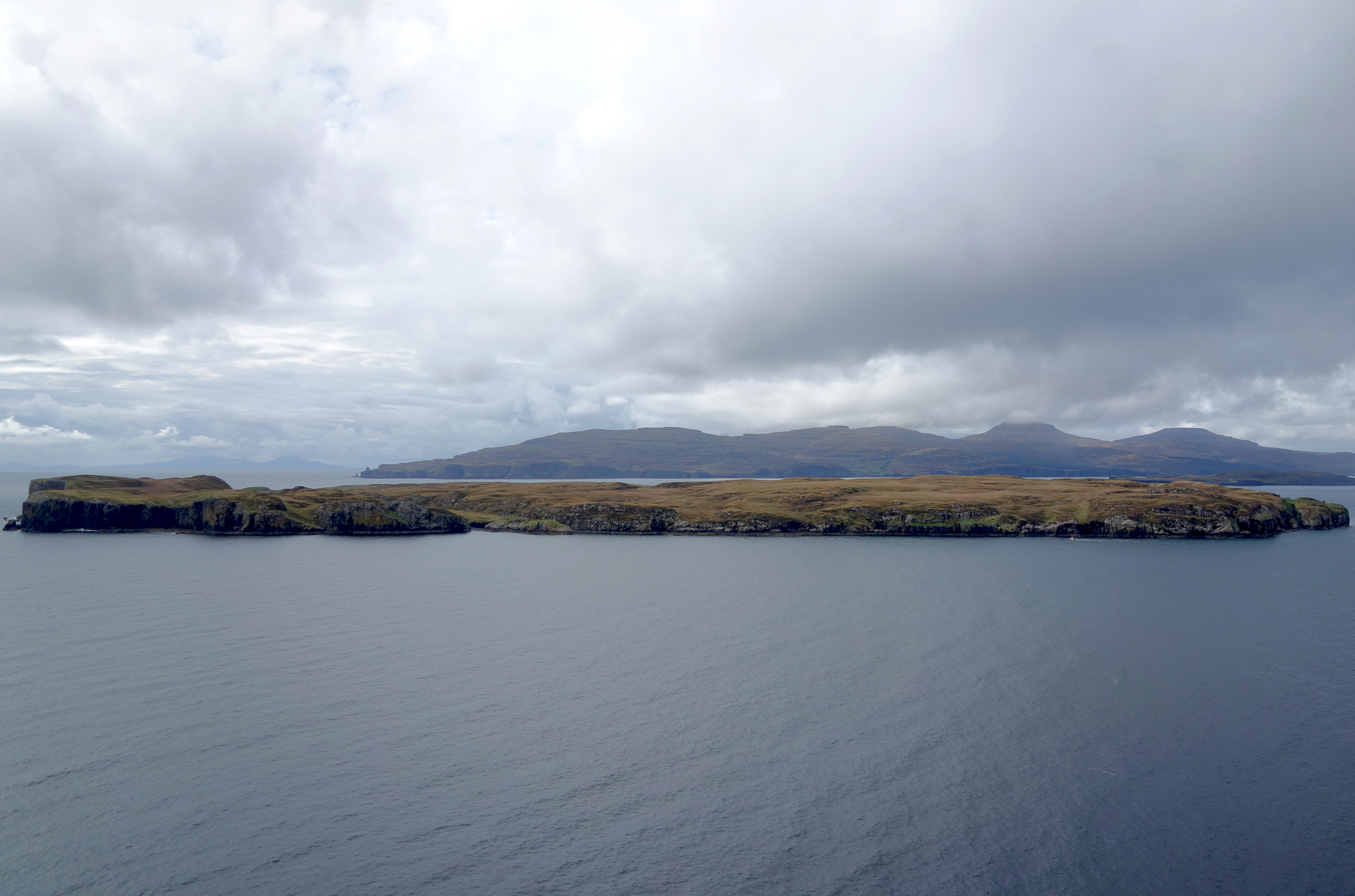

Location
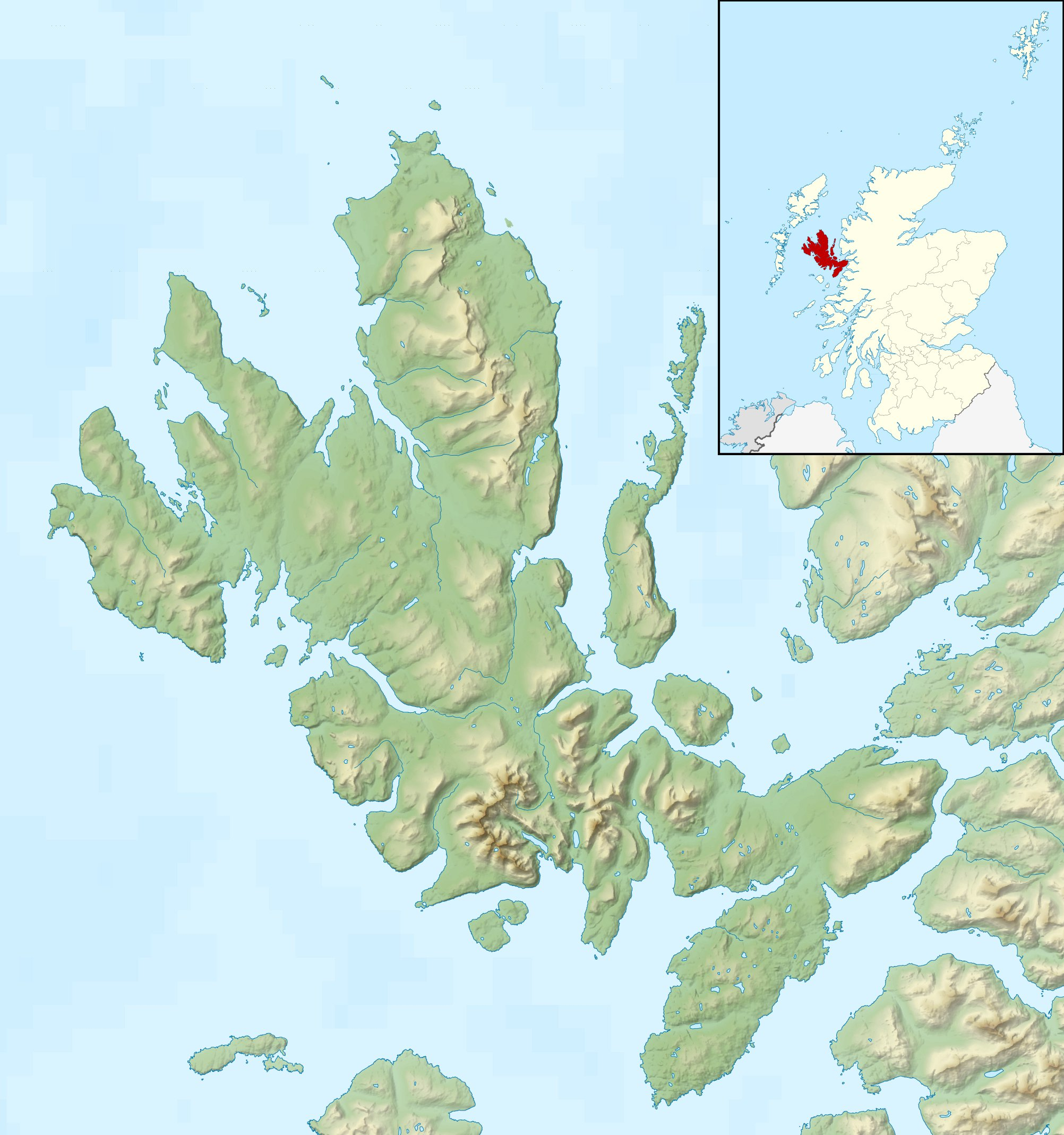
- Wiay shown relative to Skye
- OS grid reference: NG292363
- Coordinates: 57.34°N 6.5°W

Name
- Name meaning: Settlement

Physical geography
- Island group: Skye
- Area: 148 ha (366 acres)
- Area rank: 123
- Highest elevation: 61 m (200 ft)

Administration
- Council area: Highland
- Country: Scotland
- Sovereign state: United Kingdom

Demographics
- Population: 0

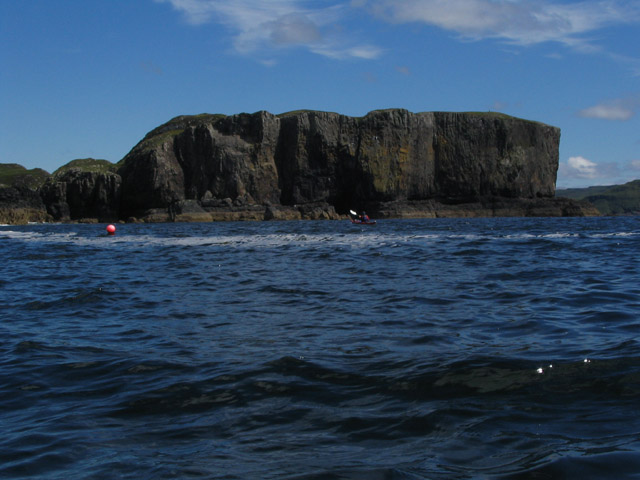
Wiay cliffs

Wiay, pronounced "waya" (Gaelic: Fuidheigh) is an uninhabited island in Loch Bracadale, off the coast of the Isle of Skye

Wiay is approximately 1.3 kilometres (3/4 mile) wide by 2.1 kilometres (1 1/4 mi) long and lies 1.3 km (3/4 mi) west of Ullinish, and 1 1/2 mi (2.5 km) north of Fiskavaig on the Minginish Peninsula. It is the largest island in Loch Bracadale, with an area of 148 hectares (370 acres).

Most of the coastline consists of cliffs up to 60 m (200 ft) high, and the southern bluff is a striking overhanging cliff of 59 m (194 ft). The highest point of the island is 61 m (200 ft).

Wiay is noted for its sea arches and large echoing sea caves, one of which is reputed to be haunted by an English ghost.

== Geography ==
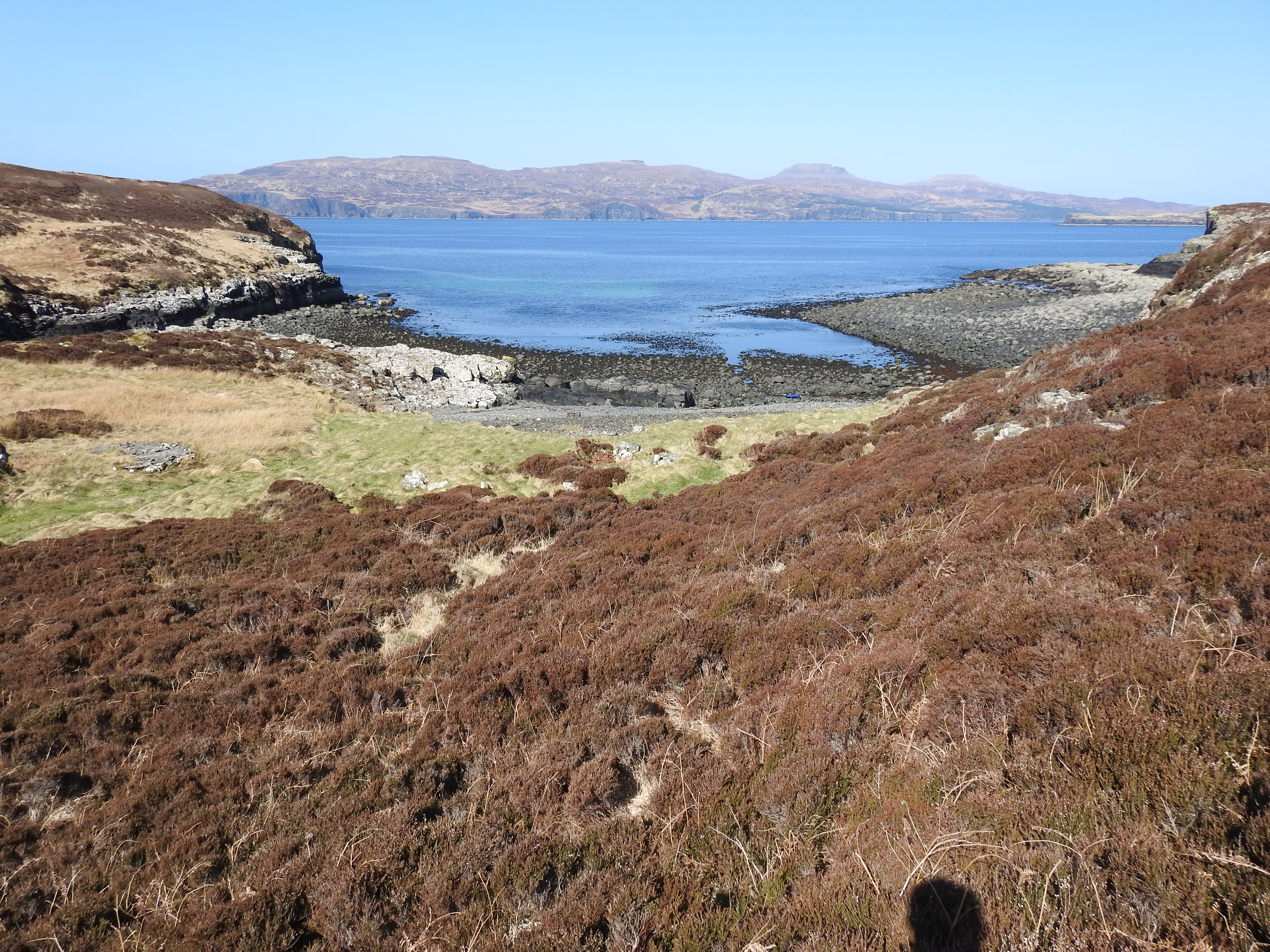
Camas na Cille, Wiay

There are five sea caves, the largest of which are at NG296356 and NG301370, one of which was visited by Johnson and Boswell in September 1773 during their Tour of the Hebrides (see "Johnson and Boswell visit" below). There is also a natural sea arch at NG358294.

One of the few low points to get onto the island is the main bay "Camas na Cille" (meaning ‘Churchyard Bay*’ in Scottish Gaelic) above which are the remains of three houses, one of which is a Blackhouse (at NG292366). There is a cut in the rocks here which is clearly man made and allows small boats onto the island even at lower tides.

Visible from the island are Uist to the west and the Cuillin to the south. To the north Healabhal Bheag and Healabhal Mhòr (MacLeod's Tables) dominate from the Duirinish Peninsula.

Key geographical points are;

- Rubha Garbh - The westernmost point of the island and a possible wreck site (see below). In Scottish Gaelic, "Rubha" means "promontory or headland" and "Garbh" means "rough/wild [of weather]", thus ‘Wild Headland’.
- Geodha nan Faochag – southwest shore – Geodha is a cove/inlet and "faochag" means whelk or periwinkle, thus "Periwinkle Cove".
- Geodha Chruidh – Eastern shore – This means "Cattle cove".

The 1881 OS Map "Inverness-shire (Isle of Skye), Sheet XXXIII" (from an 1877 survey) shows another natural sea arch at Geodha Chruidh and refers to 'Camas na Faochag' rather than 'Geodha nan Faochag' (I.e. bay rather than cove)

== Population ==
The 1841 Scottish Census documents 6 inhabitants living on Wiay (although it is then referred to as "Vuiay" (See "Wiay’s Historical Names" below). It lists one inhabited building and the inhabitants of "Vuiay" as 3 males, 3 females (2 males and 2 females under 20) All born in the county. (NB Prior to 1841 Census totals were recorded at a Parish (i.e. Bracadale) level only.

The 1851 Census shows a population of five (no further detail).

The 1861 Census shows one family living in one house with three males and three females present, none of whom were children aged 5–16.

An 1869 newspaper report (The Inverness Courier – Thursday 7 October 1869) concerning the Harmonia shipwreck (see below) notes "The only inhabitant is a shepherd named Dougald MacDonald."

The 1871 Census shows three males and two females.

The "Inverness-shire Ordnance Survey Name Books, 1876-1878" notes the following:

List of names as written	Various modes of spelling	Authorities for spelling	Situation	Description remarks
WIAY	Wiay Wia or Wiay	Mr. D. McDonald, Keeper Colbost, Struan By Portree Mr. A. McNeil D Cameron, Shepherd Carbost	032; 033	Is an island situate about 3/4 mile [1.2 km] west from the above described. It is covered with pretty good rough & healthy pasture. There is a shepherd and his family residing on the island & a number of sheep. The shepherds house is a very poor one & in miserable repair. The island is in the parish of Bracadale & is the property of McLeod of McLeod. Meaning obscure.

The 1881 Census shows 3 males & 1 female, all of whom spoke Scottish Gaelic.

The 1891 census shows Wiay to be uninhabited & the County Directory of Scotland states: "Wiay, Bracadale...(uninhabited in 1891.)" According to local history, the residents were all found dead following a fortnight of no contact, it is believed that they succumbed to tuberculosis.

== Johnson and Boswell visit. ==
It is believed that Samuel Johnson and James Boswell visited Wiay in September 1773 during their Great Hebridean Tour.

James Boswell’s Journal - "The Journal of a Tour to the Hebrides" contains the following extract:

WEDNESDAY, 22ND SEPTEMBER 1773: ULLINISH

"In the afternoon, Ulinish carried us in his boat to an island possessed by him, where we saw an immense cave, much more deserving the title of antrum immane than that of the Sybil described by Virgil, which I likewise have visited. It is one hundred and eighty feet long, about thirty feet broad, and at least thirty feet high. This cave, we were told, had a remarkable echo; but we found none. They said it was owing to the great rains having made it damp. Such are the excuses by which the exaggeration of Highland narratives is palliated."

Although Wiay is not mentioned by name it is the only island in Loch Bracadale (i.e. off Ullinish) with a sea cave of this size.

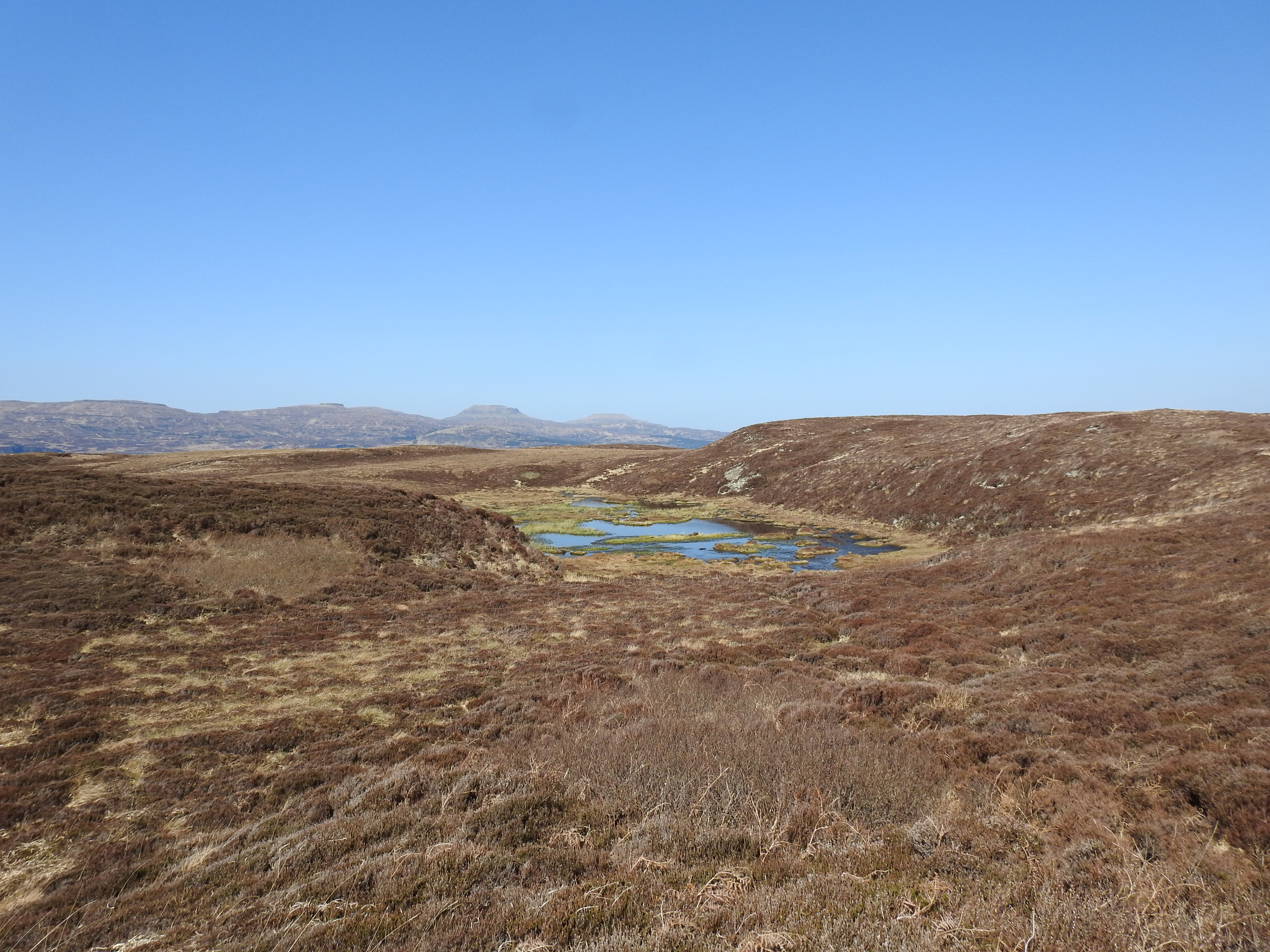
Water-lilly Pool, Wiay

== Wreck of the Harmonia ==
On Monday 5 July 1869, the ship Harmonia (a 43 m, 643-tonne barque, built in 1847 and registered in Aberdeen) left Quebec with 15 crew and a cargo of timber, bound for Aberdeen.

Later that same day, some 200 nautical miles (370 km) off the Grand Banks of Newfoundland, a strong wind & heavy seas caused the ship to spring a leak and break a mast. At 23:30 on 6 July the ship "fell over on her beam-ends, the masts being underwater" and the cabin and everything on deck was washed overboard. Eight crew, (the Captain Peter Ross, the mate, carpenter, sailmaker and four hands) were drowned.

The seven remaining crew clung to the side of the boat until the masts gave way and the boat righted itself. They remained in the waterlogged and incapacitated ship until Thursday 8 July, when they spotted the Renfrewshire out of Greenock approaching from the west and hoisted the house flag as a symbol of distress, They were rescued and taken back to Greenock, from where they returned to Aberdeen.

The derelict ship remained afloat and was spotted by the ship ‘Nova Scotian’, which was heading from Liverpool to Quebec, on the 6th September, some two months after its loss "with loss of foremast, jibboom and three topmastheads" approximately 200 nmi (370 km) northwest of Carrickfinn and 230 nmi (430 km) southwest of Barra, and around 1,500 nmi (2,800 km) from where it had been abandoned.

On or around 25 September 1869, the Harmonia was wrecked on the west coast of Wiay.

A Lloyd's of London report dated Saturday 2 October 1869 stated:

"In the night of the 25th Sept., a large timber-laden ship came ashore on the island of Vinay [Wiay], off Loch Bracadale, on the West coast of this island, and is a total wreck: the cargo, which is strewed about the coast, consists of oak logs, deals and staves, the logs marked C & JS & Co., the planks TJ, and the staves L & E. The vessel appears to have been abandoned at sea some time ago, her decks being covered with slime: one of the winches is marked 'HARMONIA, of Aberdeen, No. 2'."

The Inverness Courier (Thursday 7 October 1869) ran a report which outlined the salvage operation. It noted that Wiay was owed by a Mr Scott of Drynoch and that the wreck was reported by Wiay’s "only inhabitant", a shepherd named Dougald MacDonald who raised the alarm "on Monday last" (i.e. Monday 27 September 1869) by getting "heather, wood and hay" and setting it on fire on top of a small hillock, upon which a boat was sent to the island.

The wreck of the Harmonia remains, and is reported at Rubha Garbh, however it is noted that "The location assigned to this record is essentially tentative."

Material recovered from the wreck to date (reported under Receiver of Wrecks amnesty 2001) is listed as:

- 1 porthole (complete with deadlight)
- 1 steering wheel (13 in or 330 mm diameter),
- Maker's steering wheel (23 in or 580 mm diameter)
- Bell (5 in or 130 mm high): from seabed.

== Wiay’s Historical Names. ==
Wiay has historically been referred to by several different names including:

- Wia
- Vinay
- Vuiay
- Buyamoire
- Buia
- Via Moir

There is no agreement on what the name Wiay means but in Old Norse the word ‘Bùey’ means ‘settlement' and this is a possible derivation via Gaelic. The "Inverness-shire OS Name Books, 1876-1878" notes Wiay as the correct name i.e. "Wiay: Wia or Wiay" however the footnote states "[note] = the Shetland "Uya" from Norse "Ey" an island."

The Matheson collection volume "Norse influence on Celtic Scotland" states:

"...there are four islands named Wiay, or Buya, Bywa (1546), (Gaelic. "Fuidhaidh'), to which the Icelandic Vé-ey has been compared; Foula, N. fugl-ey, * fowl-isle.'"

- Vinay

The 1868 National Gazetteer notes: "Vinay, an island in the parish of Bracadale, in the district of Skye, county Inverness, Scotland."

The name Vinay is also used (alongside Wiay) to mark the location of the Harmonia wreck (1869) in reports of the day.

- Wia

- Plate XXV of Murdoch Mackenzie's 'A maratim survey of Ireland and the west of Great Britain', 1776, vol. II lists the island as "Wia" (and Tarner Island as "Haverfer")

- Vuiay

-The 1923 book "Place-Names of Skye and Adjacent Islands" by Alexander Robert Forbes notes: "Off Bracadale (which is given in Admiralty chart as at head of Loch Beag, Loch Harport, which is part of Loch Bracadale) are the islands of Haversay, (Tarner Island) Vuiay, [Wiay] Oransay, and Soay."

-The 1856 book "A Topographical dictionary of Scotland" by Samuel Lewis notes: "Vuiay, an island, in the parish of Bracadale, Isle of Skye, county of Inverness; containing 6 inhabitants. It is situated in Loch Bracadale, on the southwest coast of Skye; is of very small extent; and like the other islets in the same loch, is only a pendicle to a farm on the opposite shore, affording pasturage for cattle during part of the summer and winter seasons."

-‘The Index of names of places, Scotland, 1841’ lists the Island as ‘Vuiay.’

- Buyamoire

-The 1774 book (from a visit in 1549) ‘A Description of the Western Isles of Scotland Called Hybrides’ (sic) by Sir Donald Monro notes:

"119. Buyamoire. Be ane myle of sea to this ile of Cransay [Oronsay], layes ane callit Buyamoire, guid for corne and store, perteining to M’Cloyd of Herray [MacLeod of Harris]. Narrest the ile of Buyamoir lyes foure small iles."

NB - In Scottish Gaelic the word ‘mòr’ means great or big, separating "buya" from "moire".

- Buia

-The 1703 book ‘A Description of the Western Islands of Scotland’ by Martin Martin in Ch.10 "Inferior Isles about Skye" notes: "The two isles Buia and Harlas lie in the mouth of Loch-Brackadil; they are both pretty high rocks, each of them about a mile in circumference, they afford good pasturage, and there are red currants in these small isles, supposed to have been carried there at first by birds."

- Via Moir

-The first atlas of Scotland (Blaeu 1654) shows three islands as part of Loch Bracadale (albeit it places them outside in the open sea) and lists "Oronsa", "Via Moir" and "Vya beg". The logical conclusion is that Via Moir is Wiay. More speculatively, that makes Harlosh Island "Vya Beg", (*Beag" in Scottish Gaelic meaning ‘small and Harlosh being very similar in appearance & colour* to Wiay but smaller.) (*Oronsay & Tarner Island are much greener. Harlosh and Wiay are more brown/purple in appearance.)

The Blaeu notes state : "...on the south side of Skye is Oronsay, and a mile from that Wiay Beg, then Wiay Mor, and next five small obscure islands; after them Isay..."

== Wildlife ==
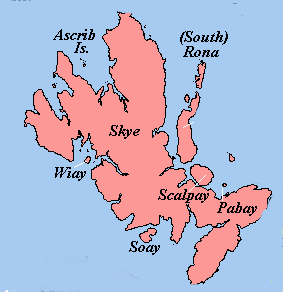
Wiay relative to Skye

There are two large herring gull colonies on the island. In the surrounding waters are seen seals, otters and porpoise, also Lion's Mane Jellyfish . Sea Eagles frequent the area, as do gannet, cormorant and other sea birds. Great Skuas nest on the island and Hen Harriers are seen. Cranberry plants (Vaccinium oxycoccos) which are rare in NW Scotland, can be found, as well as a large variety of plants.
