= Harlosh =

Coordinates: 57.385410°N 6.517894°W

Harlosh: Scottish Gaelic: Heàrrlois
- Location within the Isle of Skye
- Council area: Highland
- Lieutenancy area: Ross and Cromarty
- Country: Scotland
- Sovereign state: United Kingdom
- Post town: ISLE OF SKYE
- Postcode district: IV55
- Dialling code: 01470
- Police: Scotland
- Fire: Scottish
- Ambulance: Scottish
- UK Parliament: Inverness, Skye and West Ross-shire
- Scottish Parliament: Ross, Skye and Inverness West

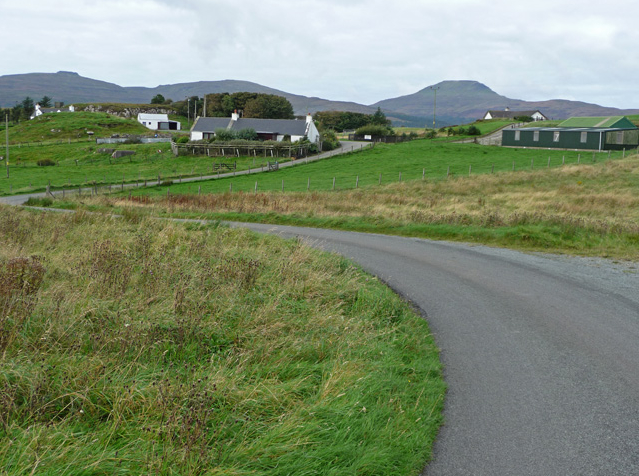
Dunanellerich in the western part of the Harlosh peninsula, with Healabhal Bheag beyond

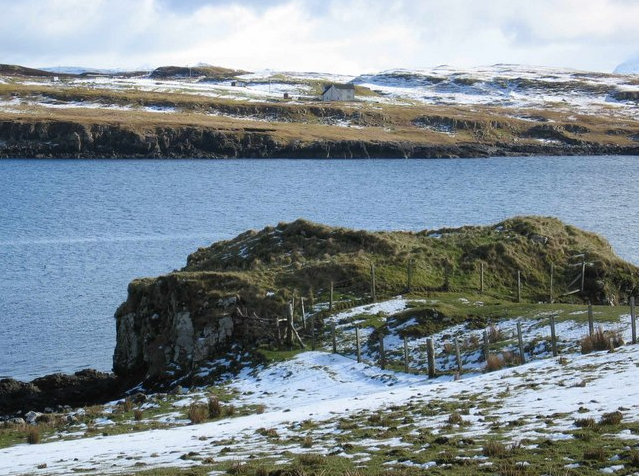
Dun Feorlig, overlooking Loch Caroy

Harlosh (Scottish Gaelic: Heàrrlois) is a settlement on the island of Skye off the west coast of Scotland. The settlement is on a peninsula of the same name.

Situated at the end of a narrow peninsula between Lochs Caroy and Bharcasaig (both of which are arms of Loch Bracadale), Harlosh is some 7 kilometres (4 1/2 miles) from the village of Dunvegan. Harlosh Island and Tarner Island lie just offshore, with Wiay some 3 kilometres (2 miles) distant to the south. The name "Harlosh" is of Old Norse origin and may refer to a river mouth, although the meaning is not clear.

The ruins of Dun Feorlig broch are just to the north east along the shores of Loch Caroy. This Iron Age structure has an external diameter of 16.3 metres (53 feet) and there is little trace of the building except for part of the foundation course. It sits on an elevated rock separated from the surrounding area by a deep hollow that was probably excavated. Dun Reil is a structure of a similar antiquity to the south of Harlosh beyond Camus Ban.

The premises of the Isle of Skye Fudge Company are located in Harlosh and the Ben Aketil wind farm is situated between Harlosh and Edinbane in the hills beyond Upper Feorlig. Part of the wind farm is owned by local people through the Isle of Skye Renewables Co-operative.

Accommodation is available in this small crofting township at a range of B&Bs.

Other small settlements on the Harlosh peninsula are Feorlig and Vatten.
