= Struan, Skye =

Coordinates: 57°22′N 6°27′W

Struan: Scottish Gaelic: An Sruthan
- Location within the Isle of Skye
- OS grid reference: NG340381
- Council area: Highland
- Lieutenancy area: Ross and Cromarty
- Country: Scotland
- Sovereign state: United Kingdom
- Post town: ISLE OF SKYE
- Postcode district: IV56
- Dialling code: 01470
- Police: Scotland
- Fire: Scottish
- Ambulance: Scottish
- UK Parliament: Inverness, Skye and West Ross-shire
- Scottish Parliament: Ross, Skye and Inverness West

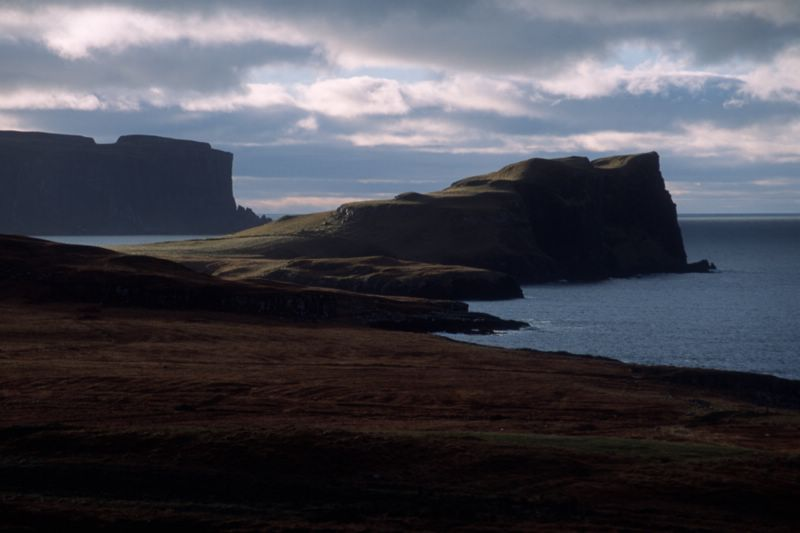
View south from Ullinish toward Oronsay with Rubha nan Clach in background.

Struan (Scottish Gaelic: An Sruthan) is a small village on the west coast of the island of Skye, on the shores of Loch Beag, itself an inlet of Loch Bracadale. "Struan" is the anglicized form (and approximate pronunciation) of the Scottish Gaelic word sruthan, meaning "small stream", or the flow at the point where a spring appears.

It has a population of around 300. While there are four different Protestant denominations represented in the area, church attendance has declined dramatically, and Sabbath keeping is largely forgotten.

The local economy, like most of Skye, is heavily supported by tourism. Fishing, crofting and to a lesser extent, large-scale farming also contribute. Struan has a small local grocery shop, four churches, a petrol station, an outdoor shop and a primary school. Buried in the old graveyard are the climber, J. Norman Collie and his longtime Skye guide, John Mackenzie of Sconser.

Immediately east of the village is the small settlement of Balgown (Baile Ghobhainn). Northwest of the village stands Dun Beag (Historic Scotland; no entrance charge), one of the best-preserved Iron Age brochs in Scotland. The small settlement of Ullinish is about 1 1/4 miles (2 kilometres) to the west and Bracadale is 1/2 mile (800 metres) to the east.
