= Tarner =

Tarner may refer to:

- Tarner Island, island in Loch Bracadale, Scotland
- Tarner Lectures, philosophy of science lecture series at Trinity College, Cambridge
