= Ullinish =

Coordinates: 57.36°N 6.45°W

Ullinish: Scottish Gaelic: Uilfhinis
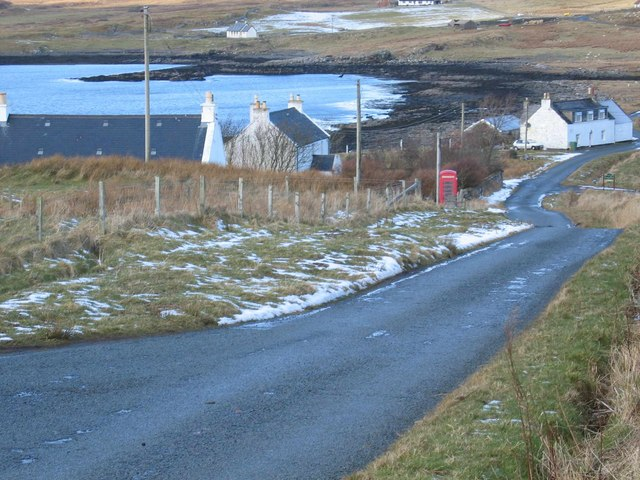

- Location within the Isle of Skye
- Council area: Highland
- Lieutenancy area: Ross and Cromarty
- Country: Scotland
- Sovereign state: United Kingdom
- Post town: ISLE OF SKYE
- Postcode district: IV56
- Dialling code: 01470
- Police: Scotland
- Fire: Scottish
- Ambulance: Scottish
- UK Parliament: Inverness, Skye and West Ross-shire
- Scottish Parliament: Ross, Skye and Inverness West

Ullinish (Gaelic: Uilfhinis) is a crofting township on Loch Bracadale, on the southwest coast of Skye, Scotland. The only promontory fort on Skye is located at Ullinish. It is situated to the west of Struan and just south of the hamlet of Ebost. Historically, Ullinish is associated with the MacLeod family. Of literary note, Samuel Johnson's views and denunciation of James Macpherson's Ossian were confirmed while Johnson was in Ullinish.

== Etymology ==
The name Ullinish is from Old Norse úlfa-nes, meaning "promontory of the wolves". In Gaelic, it is sometimes spelt as Uilinis or Uilbhinis.

== Geography ==
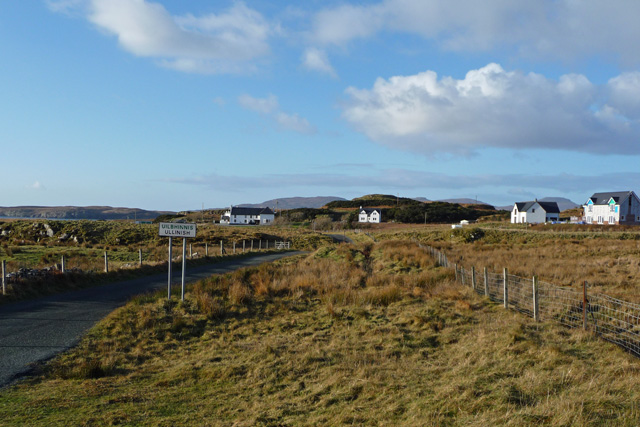
Entering Ullinish

Located on the Inner Hebrides, Ullinish lies on a small peninsula, with a boggy moorland ending at Ullinish Point. Loch Caroy is situated between Ullinish Point and Harlosh Island. The small tidal island of Oronsay is joined to Ullinish Point at low tide, and separated by a breakwater.

The town is overlooked by the low, basalt cliffs of the Cuillin Hills, and MacLeod's Table. Knock Ullinish is a small hill east of Ullinish.

== Fauna and flora ==
The common teal nests in Ullinish. Other avifauna include the common raven, long-eared owl, hen harrier, merlin, osprey, black grouse, and bar-tailed godwit.

== Landmarks ==
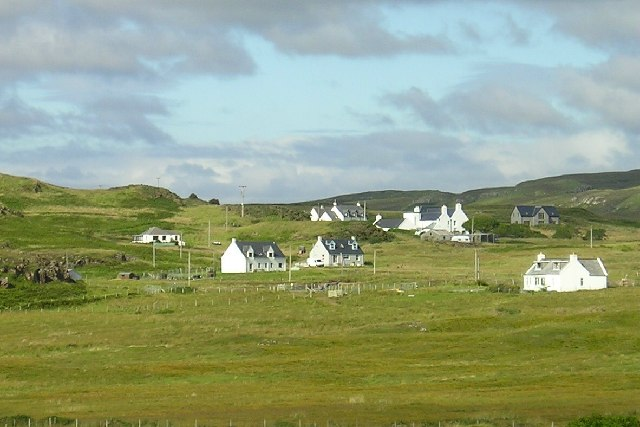
View towards the Lodge

The largest building in the area is the Ullinish Country Lodge, a historic hotel which contains six rooms. Originally a farmhouse, it was built in 1757. The building is sheltered by a small brae and surrounded on three sides by lochs. James Boswell and Doctor Johnson stayed in the farmhouse between September 21–23, 1773 during their famous literary tour of the Hebrides, documented in The Journal of a Tour to the Hebrides that was published in 1775. While in Ullinish, Johnson's views and denunciation of Macpherson's Ossian were confirmed. Here, too, Boswell remarked that the mountain view reminded him of those seen in Corsica. After two nights in Ullinish, they departed by boat for Talisker.

Remains of a chambered cairn consisting of a denuded circle of boulders are found just north of the lodge. Also of archaeological interest is a partly destroyed Earth house on the east side of the northern extremity of Knock Ullinish.

== Notable people ==
- Sergeant Donald McLeod (June 20, 1688-?)
- Mary MacLeod also known as Màiri nighean Alasdair Ruaidh "Ullinish/ Of white-hoofed cattle/ Where in my youth/ I was reared"
- Sheriff Alexander MacLeod, one of the first Sheriffs Principal in Skye
