= Carbost, Loch Harport =

Village in Scotland

Coordinates: 57.30232°N 6.35436°W

Carbost: Scottish Gaelic: Càrrabost
- Location within the Isle of Skye
- OS grid reference: NG378319
- Council area: Highland
- Country: Scotland
- Sovereign state: United Kingdom
- Post town: ISLE OF SKYE
- Postcode district: IV47
- Police: Scotland
- Fire: Scottish
- Ambulance: Scottish

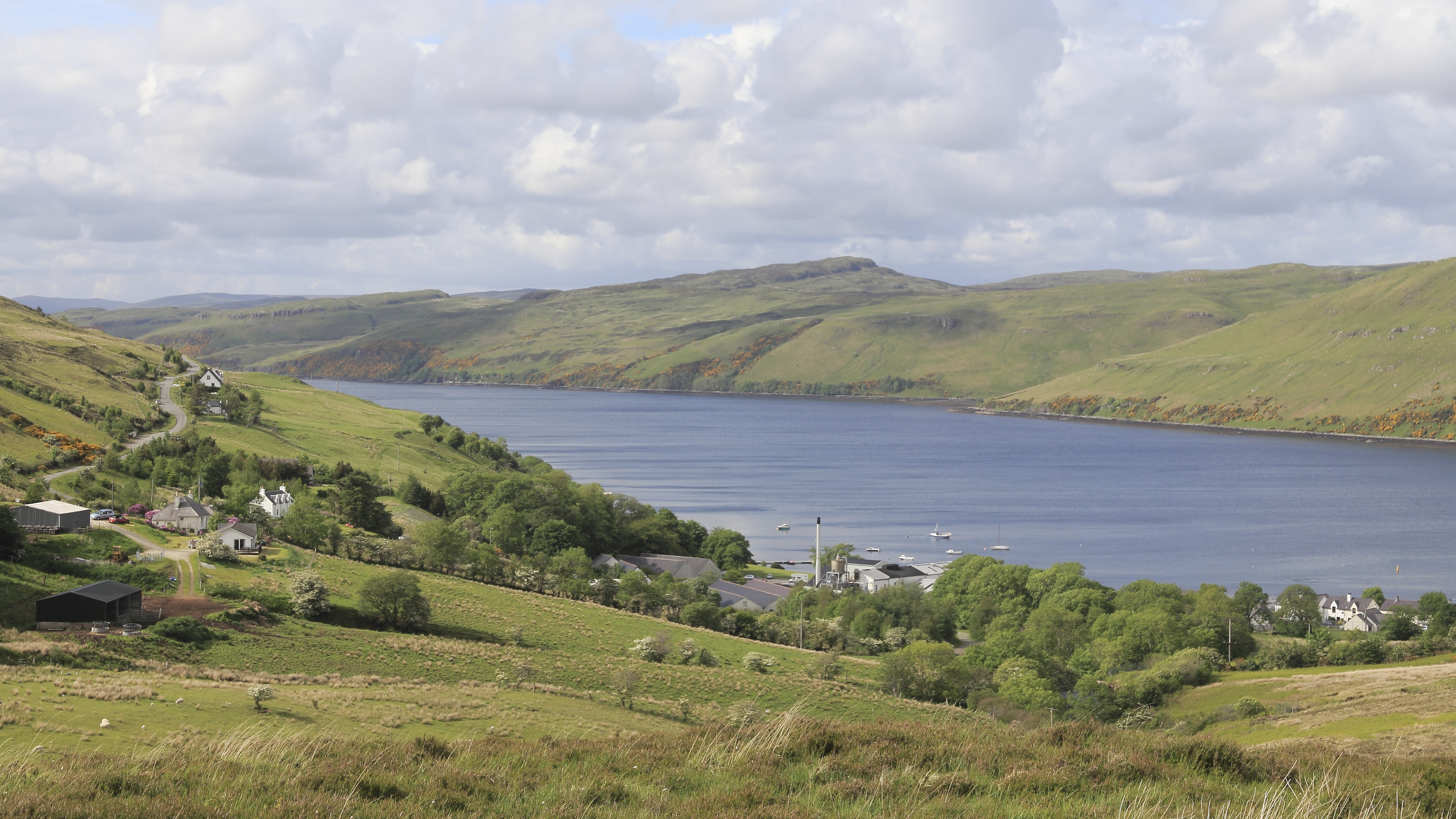
Carbost and Loch Harport

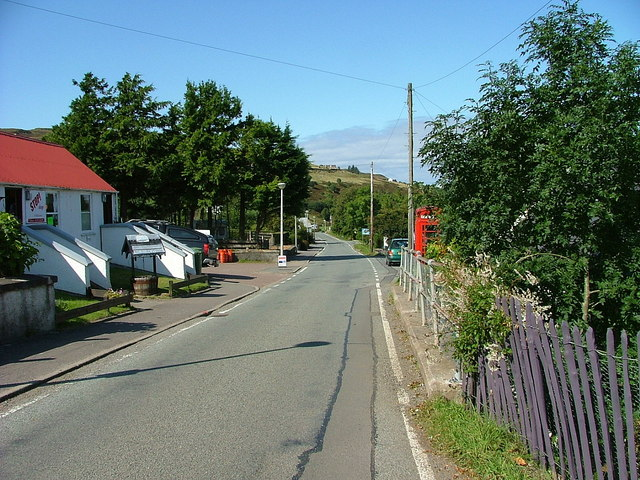
Carbost main street

Carbost (Scottish Gaelic: Càrrabost) is a village on the southwest shore of Loch Harport on the Minginish peninsula of the Isle of Skye in Scotland.

Carbost becomes a tourist hub in summer months due to the presence of the Talisker Distillery which is also one of the main employers in the village along with the local pub, The Old Inn.

Along the main road there is a community run grocery and provisions store and a coffee shop, Caora Dhubh (which means "Black Sheep" in Scottish Gaelic.) North of the distillery, Carbost Waterfront provides access to the water via a Pier, slipway and pontoons. Moorings are provided for residents and visitors with fishing boats, yachts and other recreational craft. These facilities are maintained by a community company which is expanding the facilities, including mains water to the pier & pontoons.

Carbost lies eight miles (thirteen kilometres) from Glen Brittle Fairy Pools, three miles (five kilometres) from Portnalong and four miles (six kilometres) from Fiskavaig.

Carbost falls under the Highland council area. It is in the UK Parliamentary constituency of Inverness, Skye and West Ross-shire, whose MP is the Liberal Democrat Angus MacDonald, and the Scottish Parliament constituency of Skye, Lochaber and Badenoch, which is in the Highlands and Islands electoral region and whose MSP is the former Scottish Government minister Kate Forbes of the SNP.
