= Feorlig =

Coordinates: 57.40183°N 6.49321°W

Feorlig: Scottish Gaelic: Feòirlig
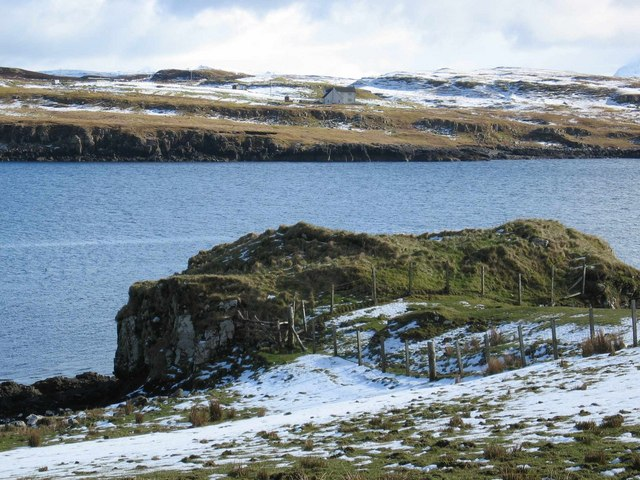
- The dun at Feorlig

- Location within the Isle of Skye
- OS grid reference: NG302435
- Council area: Highland
- Country: Scotland
- Sovereign state: United Kingdom
- Postcode district: IV55 8
- Police: Scotland
- Fire: Scottish
- Ambulance: Scottish

Feorlig (Scottish Gaelic: Feòirlig) is a small crofting settlement on the northwest shore of Loch Caroy near Dunvegan on the Isle of Skye in the Highlands of Scotland and is in the council area of Highland. The village of Harlosh is 2 miles (3 kilometres) south, on Harlosh Point.
