= Tarner Island =

Island in Scotland

Location
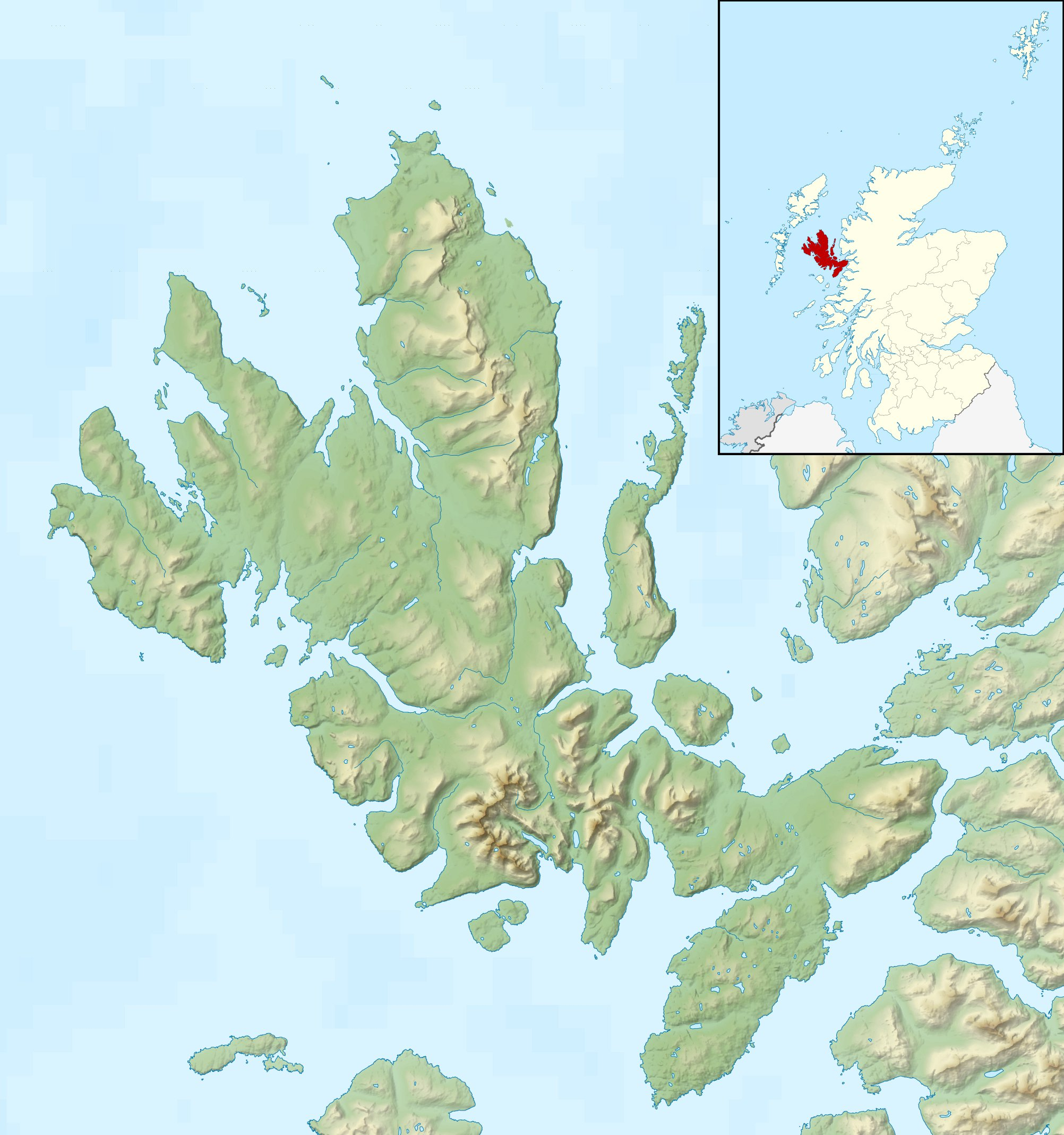
- Tarner Island shown relative to Skye
- OS grid reference: NG299391
- Coordinates: 57.362°N 6.493°W

Physical geography
- Island group: Skye
- Area: 28 ha (69 acres)
- Highest elevation: 56 m (184 ft)

Administration
- Council area: Highland
- Country: Scotland
- Sovereign state: United Kingdom

Demographics
- Population: 0

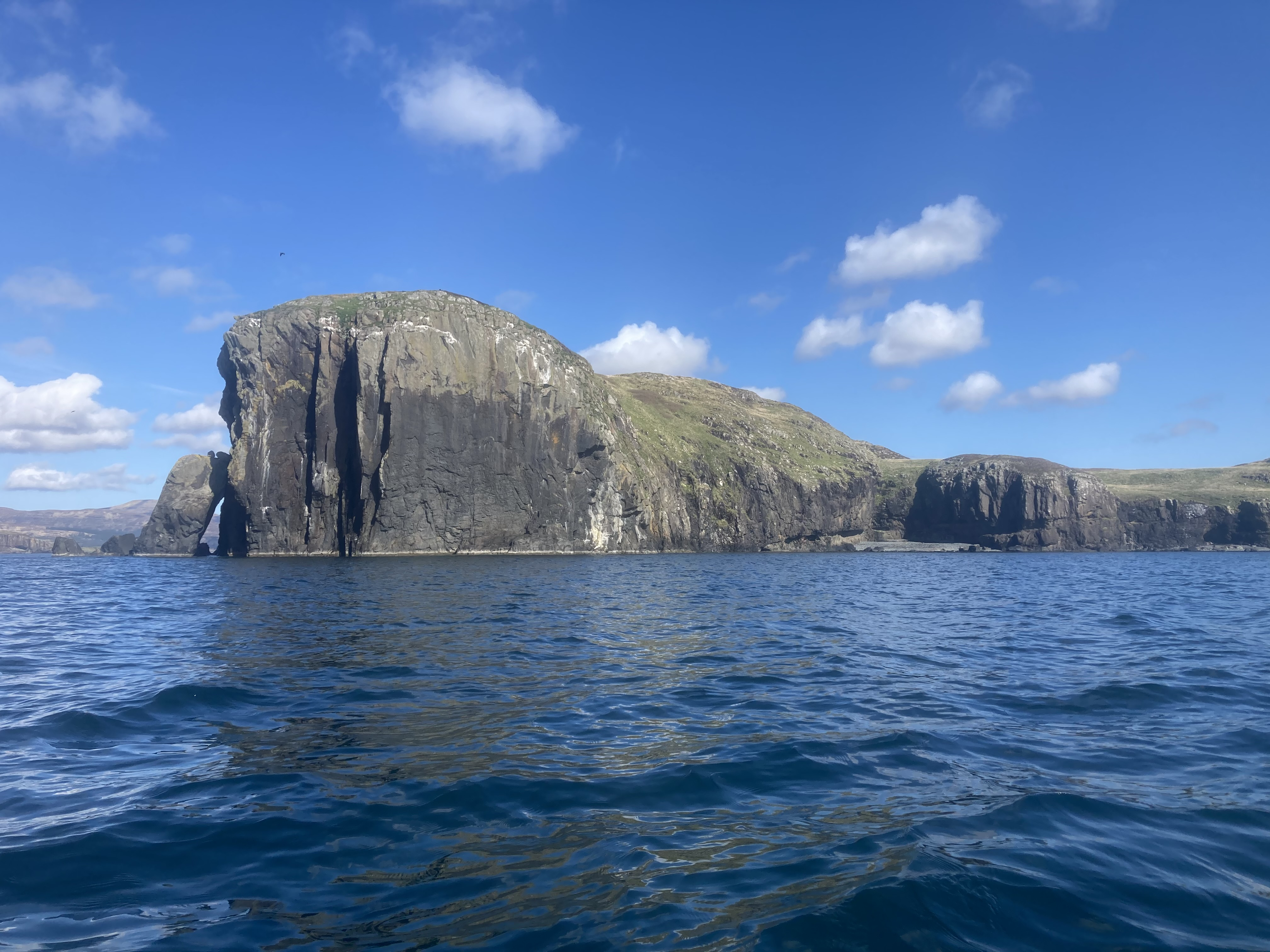

Tarner Island is a triangular shaped island in Loch Bracadale just off the coast off the Harlosh peninsula of Skye in Scotland. It is about 28 hectares (69 acres) in extent and is 0.65 miles at its longest by 0.33 miles at its widest

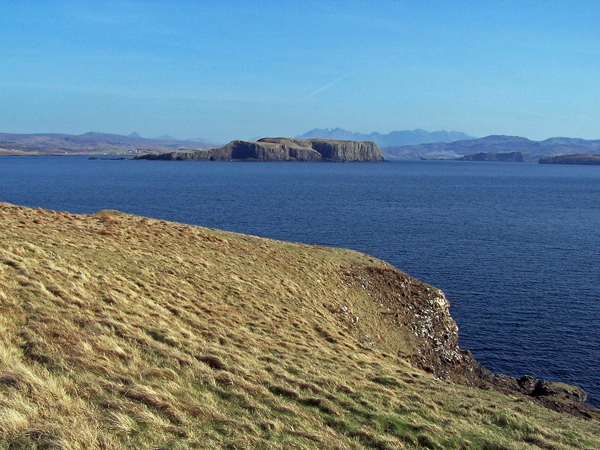
Looking south east from Harlosh Point, to Tarner Island, over Loch Bracadale.

The coastline is largely cliff-lined and rocky however slopes down to the northernmost part of the island at which point it is possible to land by small boat or kayak.

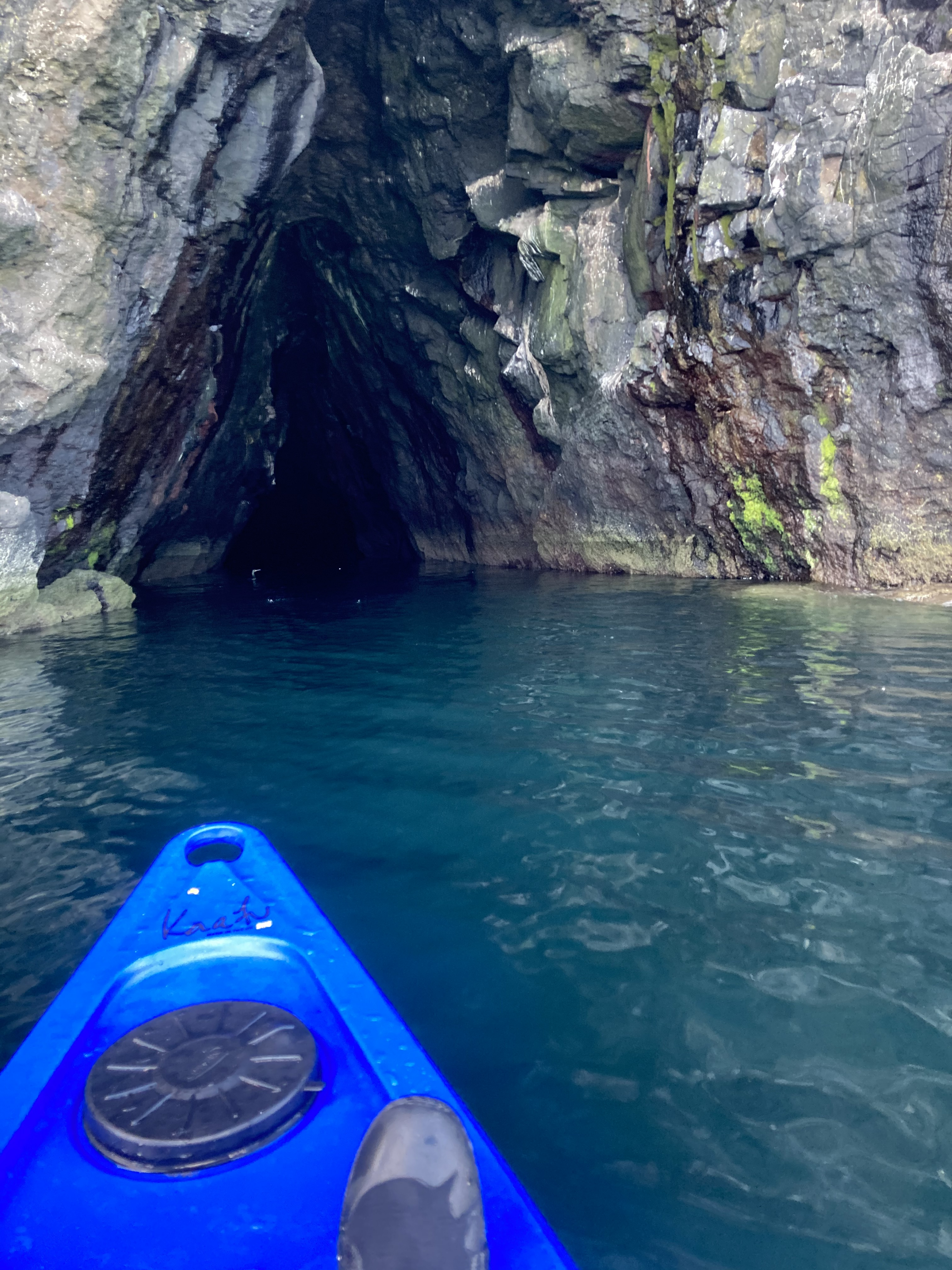

Tarner Island is dotted with small sea caves around the perimeter, many large enough to kayak into, and there is a natural arch to the north. The west of the island is dominated by cliffs and a large leaning boulder, known as 'Fingal's Limpet Hammer'. ("A huge block of trap, which has slipped from the face of a cliff in one of the islands of Loch Bracadale in Skye, is called ' Ord-bàirnich Fhinn,' Fingal's limpet-hammer."

Tarner Island is 0.5 miles from mainland Skye at its nearest point and there are several skerries including Sgeir Mhòr and Sgeir Bheag that lie just offshore to the north east between the island and Colbost Head. Grey seals frequent these skerries and can be seen in numbers around Tarner Island.

The island of Wiay lies 0.7 miles to the south, the tidal island of Oronsay lies 1.7 miles southeast and Harlosh Island is a mile to the west.

There is a large colony of Common Gulls which nest on the shore as well as Oystercatchers and other gulls. Cormorants nest in numbers around the coast.

== Notes ==
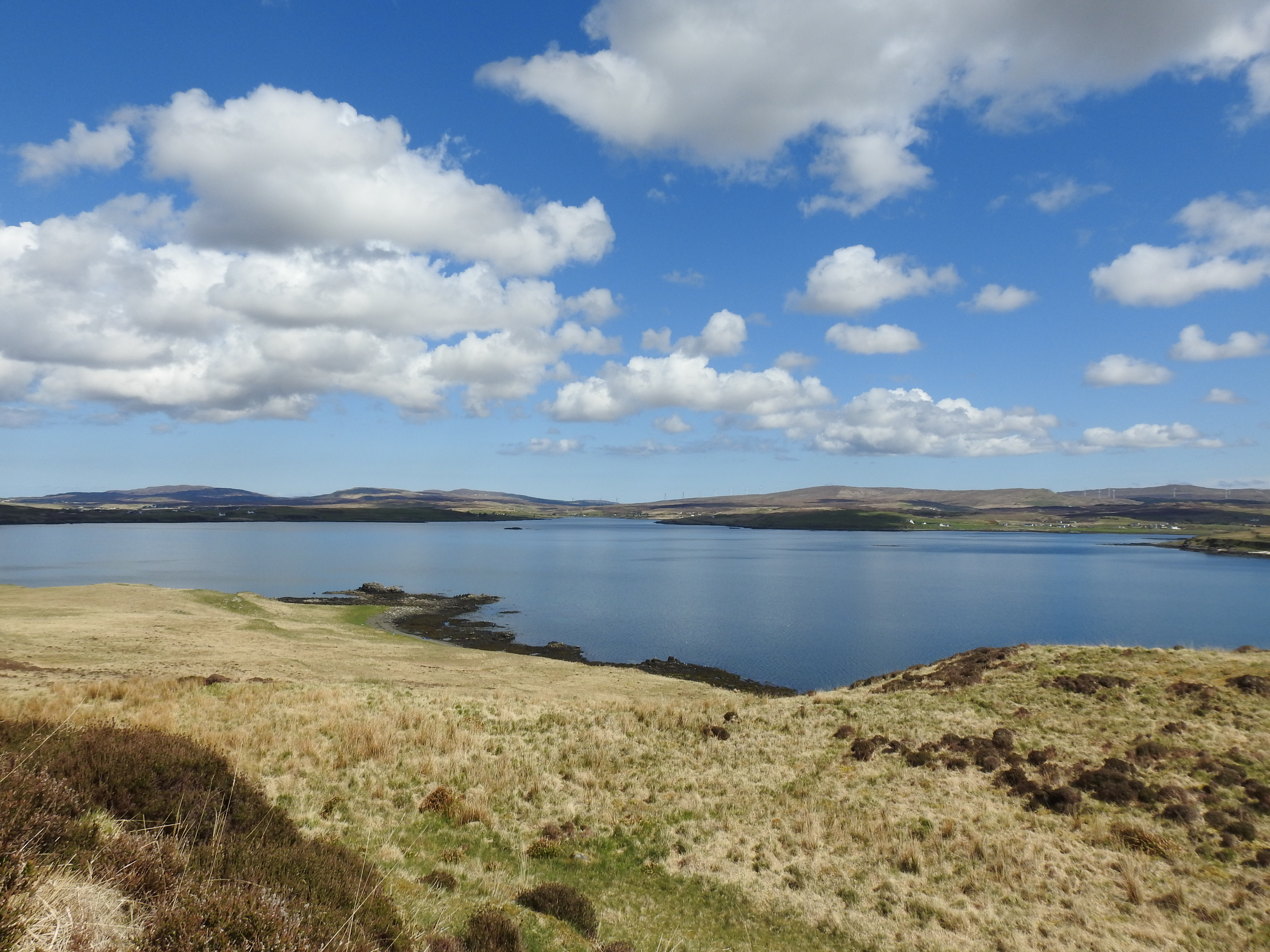
