= Bracadale =

Coordinates: 57.359625°N 6.408204°W

Bracadale: Scottish Gaelic: Bracadal
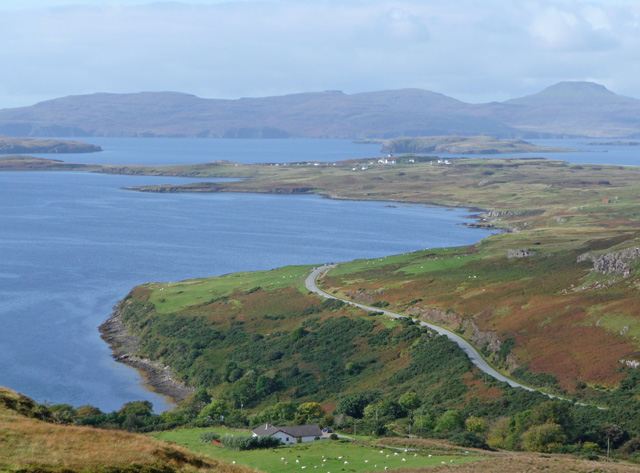
- Bracadale from Dun Taimh looking across Loch Bracadale from the iron age fort above Gesto.

- Location within the Isle of Skye
- OS grid reference: NG350385
- Council area: Highland
- Country: Scotland
- Sovereign state: United Kingdom
- Police: Scotland
- Fire: Scottish
- Ambulance: Scottish
- UK Parliament: Inverness, Skye and West Ross-shire
- Scottish Parliament: Skye, Lochaber and Badenoch

Bracadale (Scottish Gaelic: Bracadal [b̥ɾaːxkət̪əl̪ˠ]) is a settlement and civil parish on the Isle of Skye in Scotland. It lies on the west coast of the island, west-south-west of Portree, on Loch Beag, an inlet off Loch Harport. Nearby settlements include Struan to the west and Coillore on the opposite shore of Loch Beag. The parish reaches eastwards as far as Sligachan.

== Etymology ==
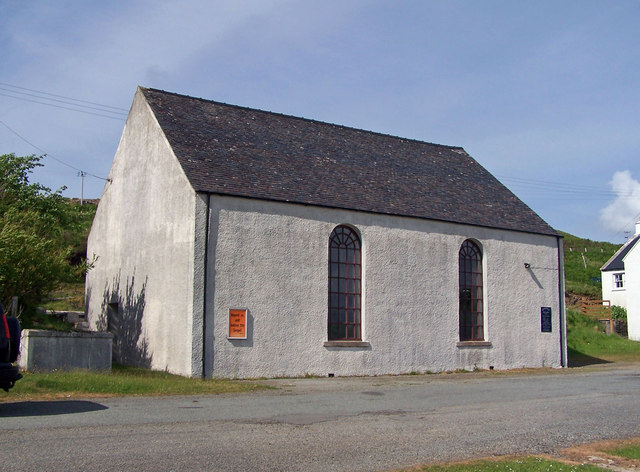
Bracadale Free Church in Struan

The name could derive from the Old Norse for "juniper dale" or "bracken dale"; or from the Scottish Gaelic breac and dail, meaning "spotted valley", or "valley of the trout/salmon".

== Places ==
- Eabost

== See also ==
- Loch Bracadale
- Alastair Campbell, Lord Bracadale - Scottish judge
- Roderick McLeod (minister) minister suspended in the Bracadale Case. Not to be confused with his namesake who wrote the Statistical Account for Bracadale
