= Loch Bracadale =

Sea loch on the west coast of Skye in Scotland

Coordinates: 57.3304°N 6.5194°W

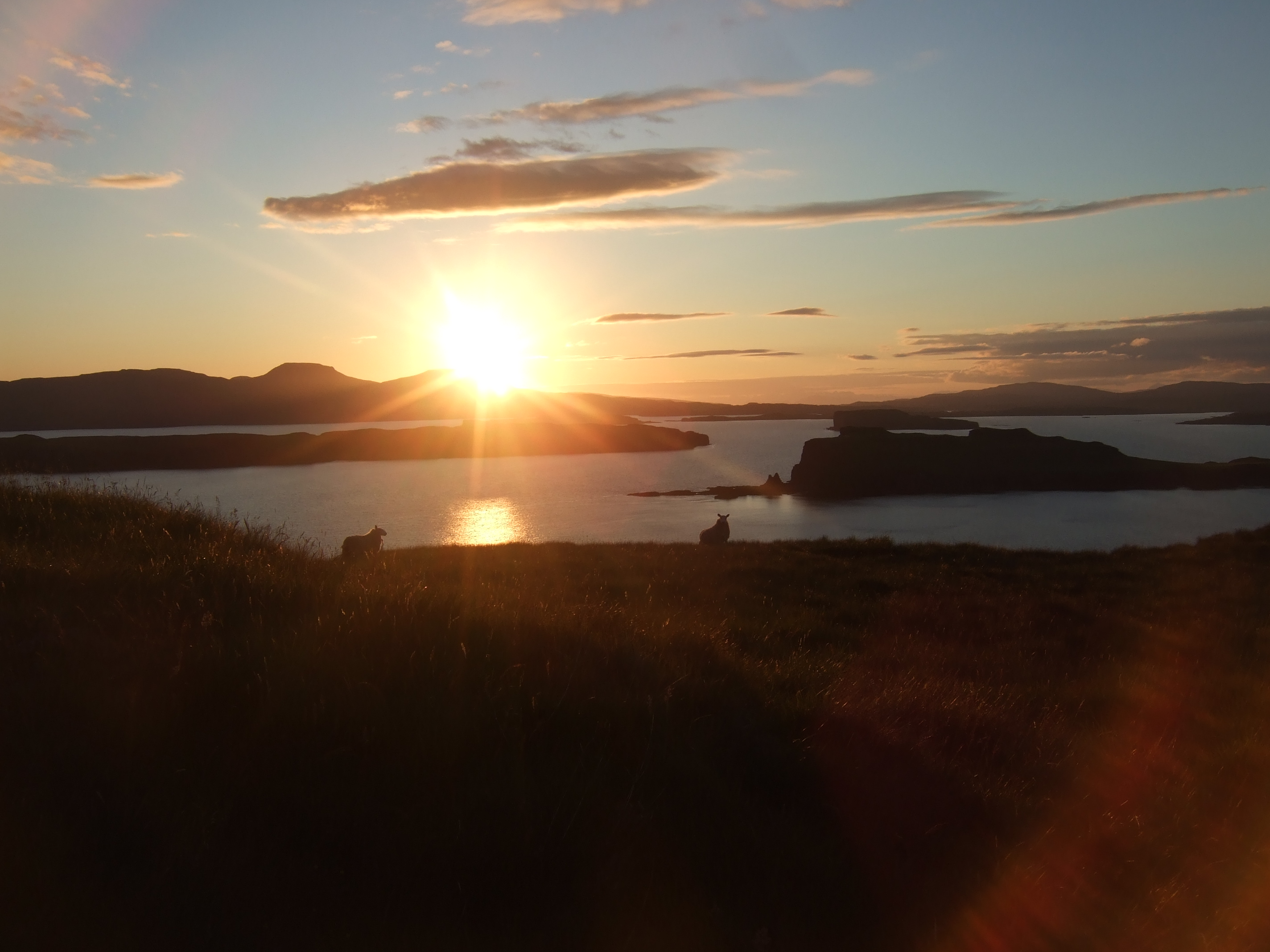
Looking Northwest from Fiskavaig across Loch Bracadale with the Oronsay, Wiay, Tarner Island, and Harlosh Island in order of distance

Loch Bracadale (Scottish Gaelic: Loch Bhràcadail) is a sea loch on the west coast of Skye, in Scotland. It separates the Minginish Peninsula in the south from the Duirinish Peninsula in the north.

Loch Bracadale and its associated inner lochs - Loch Harport, Loch Vatten, Loch Caroy, Loch Bharcasaig, Loch na Faolinn,and Loch Beag - form one of the largest areas of semi-enclosed inshore waters around the Skye coast. The shallow waters are used for salmon and mussel farms, crab and lobster creels as well as scallop diving.

The loch contains four islands: Harlosh Island, Tarner Island, Wiay and the tidal island of Oronsay, off Ullinish point.

The mouth of Loch Bracadale (where it opens to the Atlantic) is approximately 3 3/4 miles (6 kilometres) wide, from Idrigill Point on the Duirinish Peninsula to Rubha nan Clach on the Minginish Peninsula.

One-half mile (800 metres) west of Idrigill Point are the three sea stacks known as Macleod's Maidens.

On the southwestern shore of the loch, from Rubha nan Clach are impressive sea cliffs, some 100 metres (330 ft) high, dotted with caves and cascading waterfalls, up to Gob na h-Oa. Further eastward Sgùrr nan Uan marks the westward side of Fiskavaig Bay which runs round to Ardtreck (from which Dun Ardtreck overlooks Loch Bracadale at grid reference NG33503581) to the now-automated lighthouse at Ardtreck Point which sits opposite Bracadale Point (between Bracadale and Ullinish).This point, between Ardtreck Point and Bracadale Point (or Rubh' Ard-Chràighe, & Rubha Bhracadale) is where Loch Bracadale becomes Loch Harport.

== See also ==
- Bracadale
