= Portnalong =

Coordinates: 57.325476°N 6.407432°W

Portnalong: Scottish Gaelic: Port nan Long
- Location within the Isle of Skye
- OS grid reference: NG348347
- Council area: Highland
- Country: Scotland
- Sovereign state: United Kingdom
- Postcode district: IV47 8
- Police: Scotland
- Fire: Scottish
- Ambulance: Scottish

Portnalong (Scottish Gaelic: Port nan Long) is a small village on north west of the Isle of Skye on the shore of Loch Harport. Portnalong is Gaelic for "harbour of the ships". It was founded by crofters from Lewis and Harris in 1921.

Portnalong and Fiskavaig are both crofting townships in the North Talisker common grazings where 69 crofters hold in common the sheep stock club that manages that commons.

Portnalong served as a refueling point for allied shipping during World War II. Also in World War II the surrounding hills were used to train the Norwegian resistance soldiers who were involved in the Norwegian heavy water sabotage.

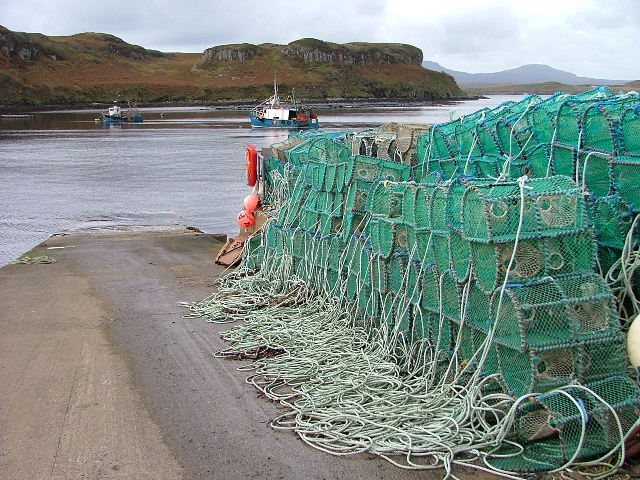
Creels at Portnalong Pier
