= Minginish =

Peninsula on the Isle of Skye, Scotland

Coordinates: 57.25°N 6.31°W

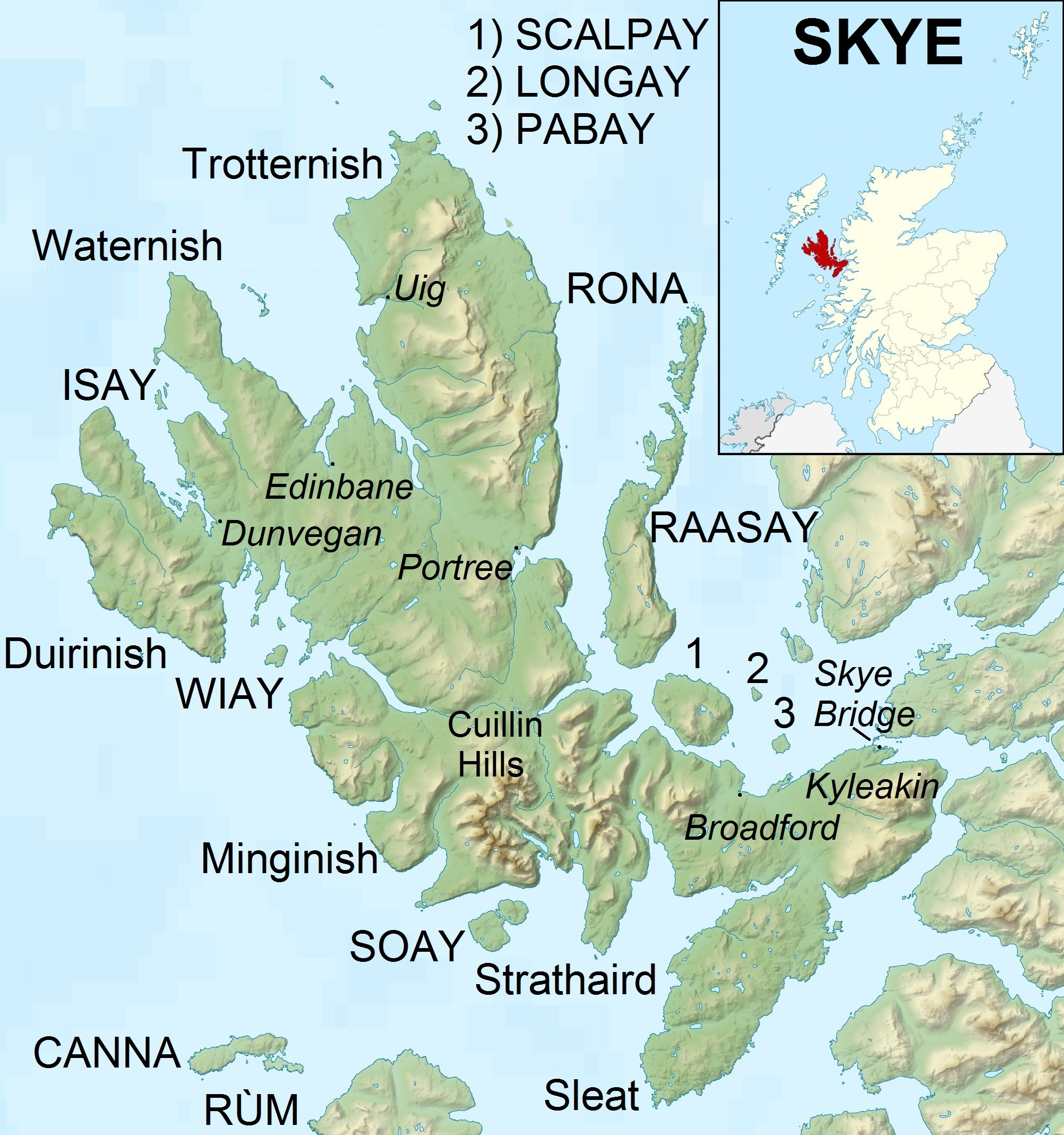
Map of Skye showing Minginish

Minginish (Scottish Gaelic: Minginis) is a peninsula on the Isle of Skye in Scotland. It is situated on the west coast of the island and runs from Loch Scavaig in the south (which separates Minginish from the Strathaird Peninsula), along the western coast of Skye to Loch Bracadale in the north west (which separates Minginish from the Duirinish Peninsula), to Loch Harport in the north east, and Glen Sligachan in the south east. It includes most of the peaks of the Cuillin hills including Sgurr Alasdair, the highest point on the island at 992 metres (3,255 ft). The island of Soay lies offshore across the Soay Sound, with the Small Isles further south across the Cuillin Sound.

Much of the interior is uninhabited and the terrain is a series of hills and mountains dissected by steep-sided valleys such as Glen Brittle and Glen Eynort. To the east, Loch Coruisk, which has been painted by William Daniell and J. M. W. Turner amongst others and visited by Walter Scott. is only accessible by boat or on foot via a track from Sligachan. It is also possible to walk from Elgol, but one section of the path ("the Bad Step") presents some potential difficulties for the nervous or inexperienced.

There are a number of small settlements in Minginish, principally along the south & east coast of Loch Harport & the north west coast of Loch Bracadale (from which Loch Harport originates), including Carbost, Drynoch, Portnalong, Fernilea, Ardtreck and Fiskavaig. Eynort is further south while Talisker is to the west. Crofting & tourism are mainstays of the economy and Talisker whisky is distilled in Carbost.

The A87 (which runs south to north up Skye from Kyleakin up to Uig) touches Minginish at Sligachan.

The Gaelic name Minginis means "main headland" with the old Norse name being "Mikil Nes" meaning great headland.

== Notable residents ==
- Roderick John MacLeod, Lord Minginish (born c. 1953), Chairman of the Scottish Land Court since 2014, was raised in Portnalong in Minginish and now lives in Edinburgh.

== See also ==
- Duirinish
- Sleat
- Strathaird
- Trotternish
- Waternish
