= Healabhal Mhòr =

Hill on the Isle of Skye

- MacLeod's Table North
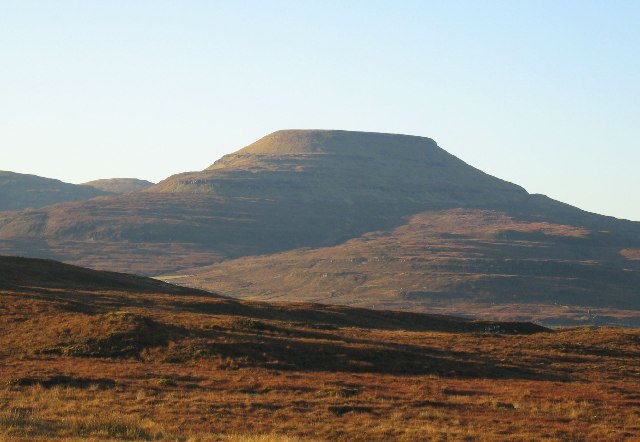
- Healabhal Mhòr

Highest point
- Elevation: 471 m (1,545 ft)
- Prominence: 184 m (604 ft)
- Listing: Marilyn

Geography
- Location: Skye, Scotland
- OS grid: NG220445
- Topo map: OS Landranger 23

Healabhal Mhòr (471 m), is a hill in the north of the Isle of Skye, Scotland. It is also known as MacLeod's Table North, as it lies close the fellow flat-topped hill of Healabhal Bheag, or MacLeod's Table South. Despite its lower height, it has a greater bulk than its neighbour.

The more commonly climbed of the two peaks, walks usually start from the coastal village of Dunvegan. The summit plateau provides an outstanding view to the Outer Hebrides on a clear day.
