= Harlosh Island =

Island in Scotland

Eilean Heàrrlois (Gaelic)

Location
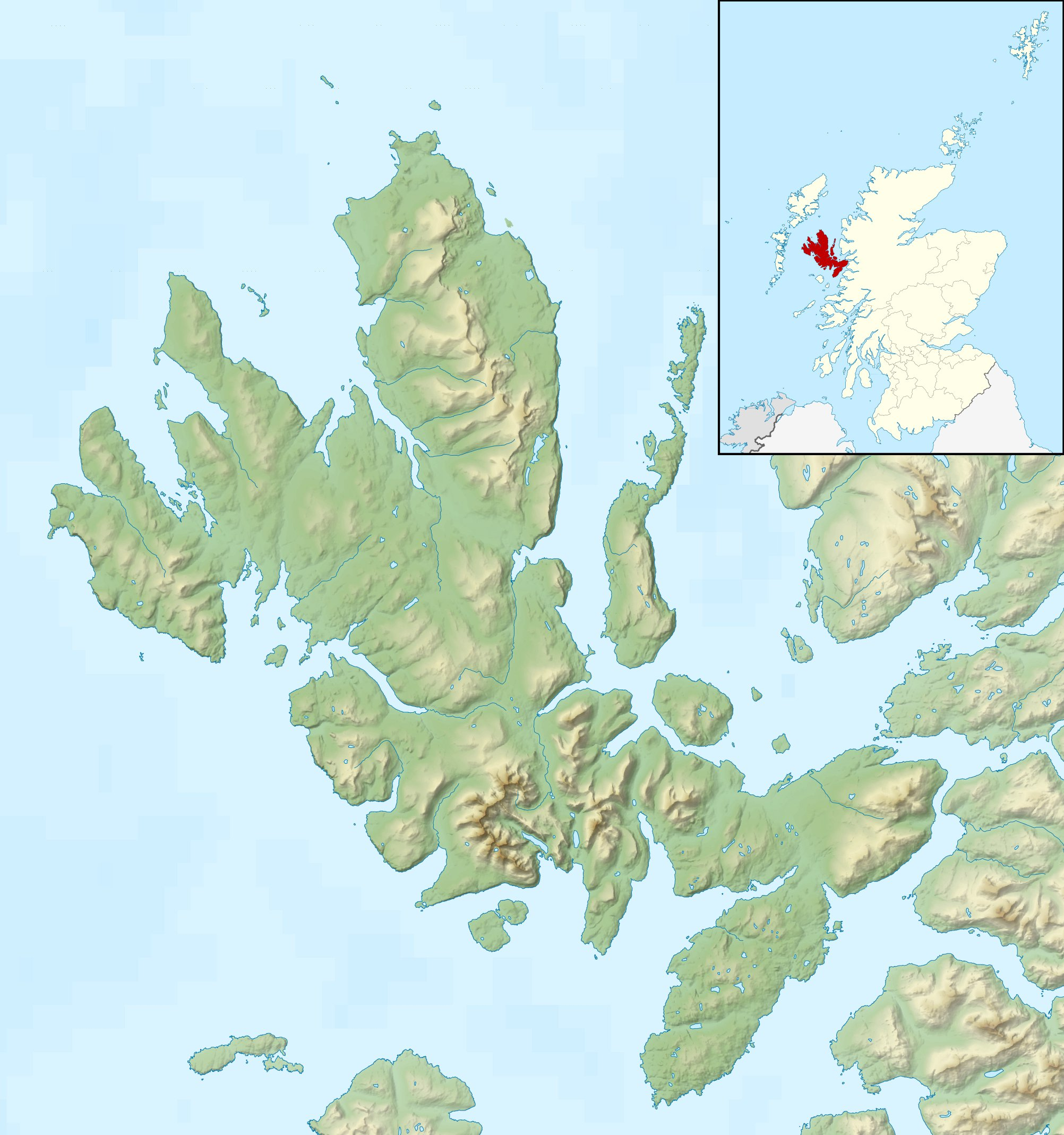
- Harlosh Island shown within Highland Scotland
- OS grid reference: NG278393
- Coordinates: 57.368°N 6.525°W

Name
- Name meaning: "river mouth island"?

Physical geography
- Island group: Skye
- Area: 28 ha
- Highest elevation: 51 m

Administration
- Council area: Highland
- Country: Scotland
- Sovereign state: United Kingdom

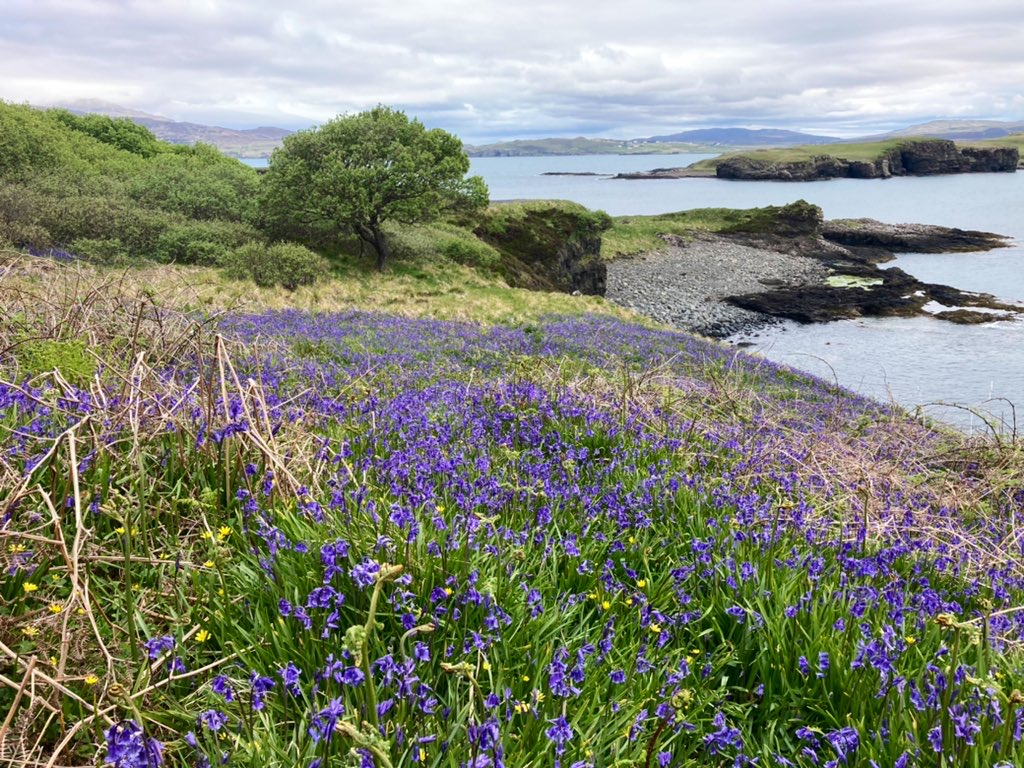

Harlosh Island is one of four islands to be found in Skye's Loch Bracadale. Harlosh Island is one mile (1.5 kilometres) from the coast of the Duirinish Peninsula and four miles (six kilometres) from the coast of the Minginish peninsula. At low tide it is only about 100 metres (330 ft) from Harlosh Point (between Loch Caroy and Loch Vatten) on mainland Skye.

The island is around 28 hectares (69 acres) in area, making it roughly the same size as Tarner Island (1.4 km or 7/8 mi to the east). The coastline, which is largely cliff-lined, has a cave on the west coast.

The island is 1,010 metres (5/8 mile) long at its longest and 675 m (7/16 mi) wide at its widest.

Harlosh Skerry lies just offshore to the north west, upon which seals can be seen frequently. At low tide on the northern coast there is a large sandy bay, however, watercraft should take caution when attempting to land in the bay as several rock formations pose a navigational hazard at low tide.

The name "Harlosh" is of Old Norse origin and may refer to a river mouth, although the meaning is not clear.

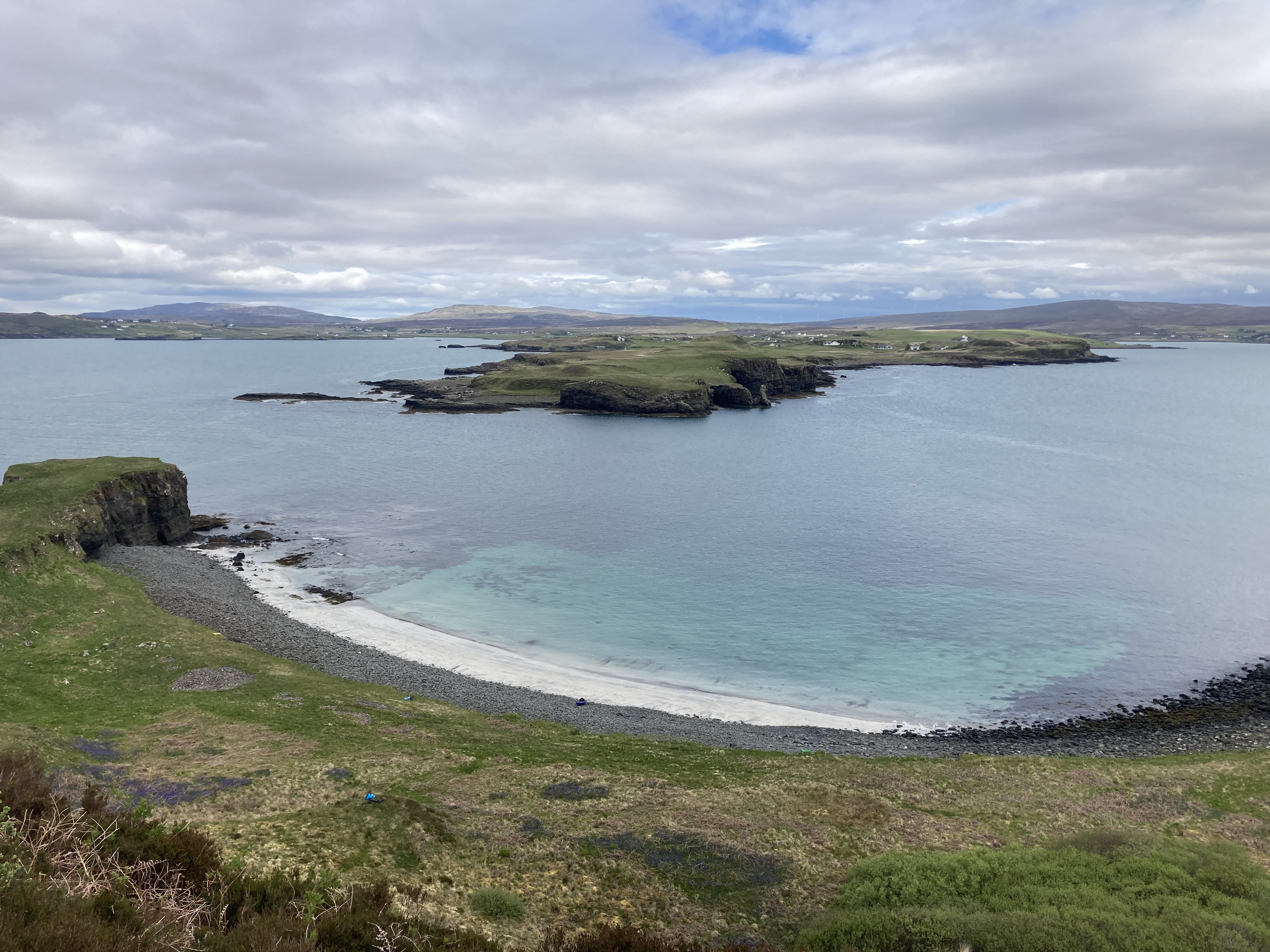
Harlosh Island Bay looking across to Harlosh Point.
