= Healabhal Bheag =

Mountain in Scotland

Coordinates: 57.3844°N 6.6210°W

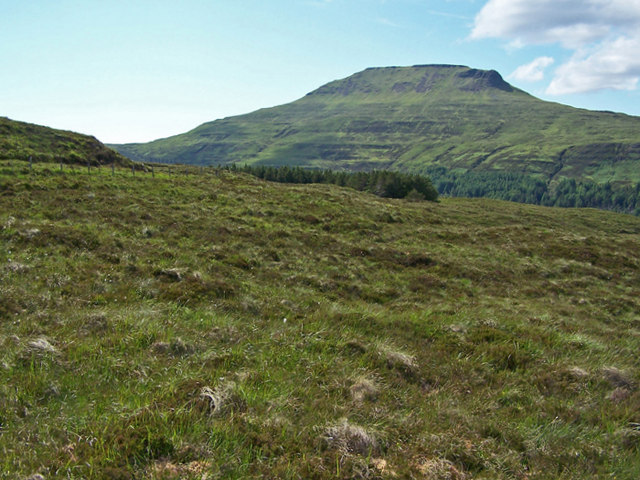
- Healabhal Bheag

Highest point
- Elevation: 489 m (1,604 ft)
- Prominence: c. 464 m
- Parent peak: Sgùrr Alasdair
- Listing: Marilyn

Geography
- Location: Skye, Scotland
- OS grid: NG224421

Healabhal Bheag is a hill located on the Duirinish peninsula of the Isle of Skye in the Inner Hebrides, Scotland. It is also known as MacLeod's Table South and is part of the prominent pair of peaks known as MacLeod's Tables that dominate the views to the west of Dunvegan and to the north of Harlosh.
