= Stornoway Town Hall =

Municipal building in Stornoway, Scotland

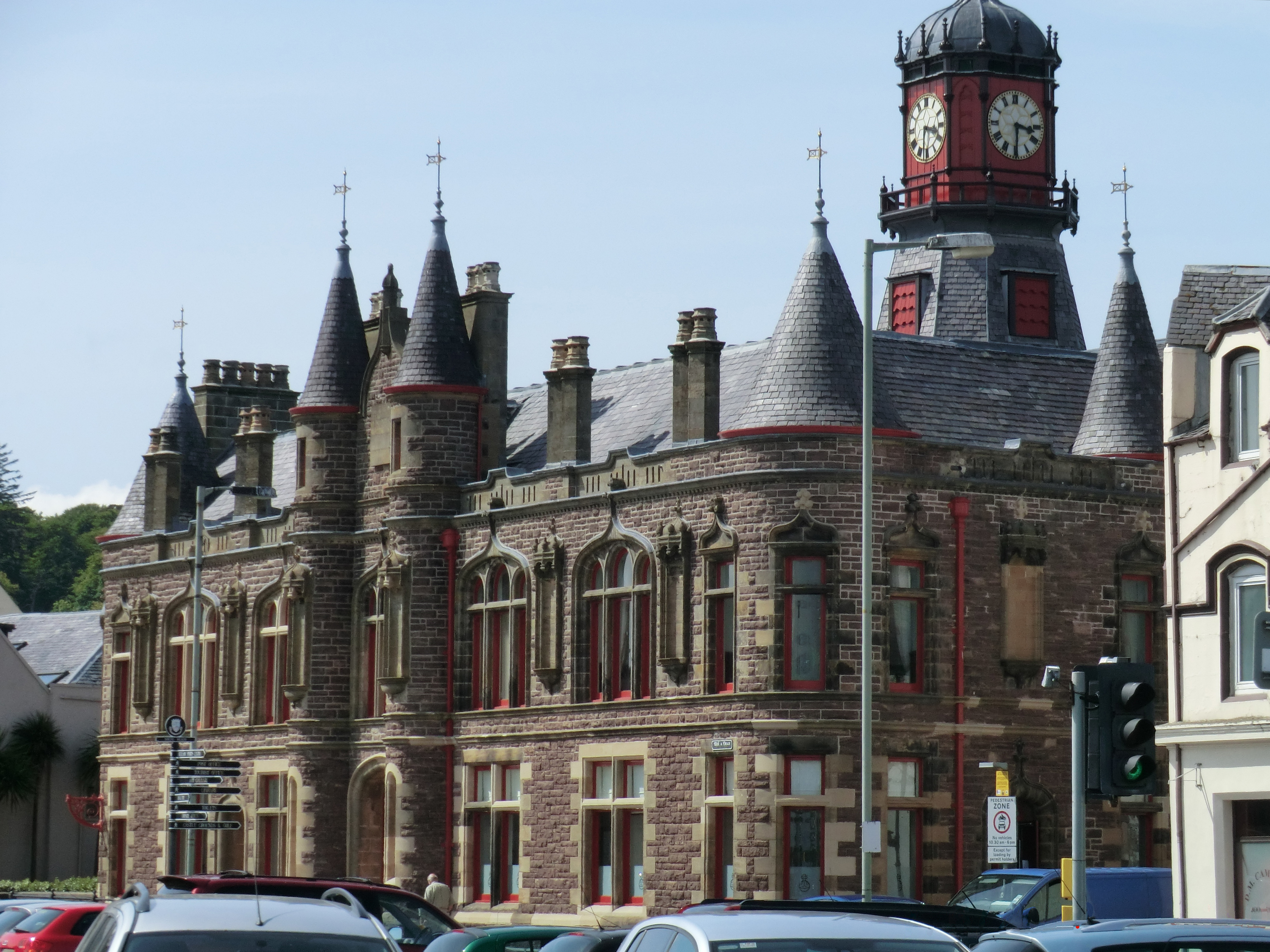
- Stornoway Town Hall building in 2012

- Shown on Lewis
- 58.2082°N 6.3884°W
- Location: Stornoway

History
- Built: 1929

Site notes
- Architect: John Robertson
- Architectural style: Gothic Revival style

Listed Building – Category B
- Designated: 25 November 1980
- Reference no.: LB41738

Stornoway Town Hall is a former municipal building on South Beach in Stornoway, Isle of Lewis, Scotland. The town hall, which was the headquarters of Stornoway Town Council, is a Category B listed building.

== History ==
Proposals for a town hall in Stornoway, to be funded by public subscription, were first considered by the town council in 1897. The foundation stone for the new building was laid by Major Duncan Matheson of Lews Castle in August 1903. It designed by John Robertson of Inverness in the Gothic Revival style and opened by the former Prime Minister, the Earl of Rosebery, on 7 September 1905.

The clock was built by John Smith and Sons of Derby. The four faces of the clock were lit by gas and the hours were struck on a new bell. This was destroyed in a fire on 2 March 1918 when the clock tower collapsed.

Following the fire, the town hall was rebuilt in the same style and re-opened by the President of the Sun Life Assurance Company of Canada, Thomas Bassett Macaulay, who was a member of the Macaulay family of Lewis and a prominent contributor to the rebuilding fund, in 1929.

The design involved a symmetrical frontage with eleven bays facing South Beach; the central section featured a round-headed doorway on the ground floor flanked by turreted bays; there were four triple windows, each with an ogee moulding, on the first floor; the building also featured turreted corner bays and a central clock tower with a cupola. Internally, the principal room was the public hall, which was in the centre of the building, lying parallel to the main frontage.

The clock tower gained some fame from the song Lovely Stornoway which was sung by Calum Kennedy in the 1960s.

The building served as the headquarters of Stornoway Town Council until it was absorbed into Comhairle nan Eilean Siar in 1975. The building was then used as the home of the arts centre, An Lanntair, until October 2005 when the centre moved to a purpose-built facility on the seafront. The town hall was then extensively refurbished for £2.1 million, with financial support from Comhairle nan Eilean Siar, the Heritage Lottery Fund and Historic Scotland, to the designs of architects, Simpson & Brown, and was re-opened for community use in March 2012. The refurbishment works included the reinstatement of the original fourteen roof lights in the main hall, so providing natural lighting to the room, as well as the removal of the stage in the main hall, so revealing three stained glass windows in the western gable and providing additional natural light.

The Earl and Countess of Wessex visited the town hall and met local leaders of the Duke of Edinburgh's Award scheme in May 2014.

== See also ==
- List of listed buildings in Stornoway
