= List of listed buildings in Stornoway =

This is a list of listed buildings in the parish of Stornoway in the Outer Hebrides, Scotland.

== List ==
Name	Location	Date listed	Grid ref. (Note: Sometimes known as OSGB36, the grid reference (where provided) is based on the British national grid reference system used by the Ordnance Survey. • "Guide to National Grid". Ordnance Survey. • "Get-a-map". Ordnance Survey.)	Geo-coordinates	Notes	LB number (Note: Historic Environment Scotland assign a unique alphanumeric identifier to each designated site in Scotland, for listed buildings this always begins with "LB", for example "LB12345".)	Image
1, 3 Cromwell Street And 20 South Beach Thorlee Guest House				58°12′29″N 6°23′16″W	Category C(S)	41678	Upload Photo
59-63 (Odd Nos) Cromwell Street and 1 Church Street Loch Erisort				58°12′35″N 6°23′18″W	Category B	41681	Upload another image
32-38 (Even Nos) Cromwell Street				58°12′35″N 6°23′20″W	Category B	41683	Upload Photo
Francis Street, Museum (Formerly Free Church Seminary And School Building)				58°12′34″N 6°22′59″W	Category B	41689	Upload another image
2 Goathill Crescent, Wandene Including Boundary Walls And Gatepiers				58°12′43″N 6°22′54″W	Category B	41691	Upload another image
2 Goathill Road And Matheson Road, Including Boundary Walls Gates And Gatepiers				58°12′41″N 6°22′57″W	Category B	41692	Upload Photo
4, 6 Goathill Road Including Boundary Wall, Gates And Railings				58°12′42″N 6°22′55″W	Category B	41693	Upload another image
22, 24 James Street Bellevue House Including Boundary Walls Gates And Railings				58°12′30″N 6°22′58″W	Category B	41698	Upload Photo
26 And 27 James Street Including Boundary Walls, Gates And Railings				58°12′30″N 6°22′57″W	Category B	41699	Upload Photo
67-71 (Odd Nos) Kenneth Street				58°12′40″N 6°23′17″W	Category C(S)	41709	Upload Photo
3, 5 Matheson Road Including Boundary Walls, Gates And Gatespiers				58°12′37″N 6°22′54″W	Category B	41717	Upload Photo
9, 11 Matheson Road Including Boundary Walls, Gates And Railings				58°12′38″N 6°22′55″W	Category B	41719	Upload another image
2 (Fasgadh), 4 (Brentor), Matheson Road Including Boundary Walls, Gates And Railings				58°12′33″N 6°22′55″W	Category B	41723	Upload another image
6, 7 North Beach				58°12′30″N 6°23′28″W	Category B	41733	Upload Photo
North Beach Quay/North Beach Old Sail Loft And House Adjoining				58°12′30″N 6°23′30″W	Category A	41735	Upload another image
28, 30 Scotland Street				58°12′43″N 6°23′03″W	Category C(S)	41736	Upload Photo
3 South Beach, Star Inn				58°12′29″N 6°23′23″W	Category C(S)	41739	Upload Photo
14, 15 South Beach				58°12′29″N 6°23′22″W	Category B	41740	Upload Photo
Lews Castle Driveway Bridge At NGR NB 4210 3321				58°12′44″N 6°23′33″W	Category B	18826	Upload Photo
Gress Lodge Including Outbuilding To Rear				58°17′38″N 6°16′42″W	Category B	18674	Upload Photo
Knock Church Of Scotland At Garrabost Point				58°13′16″N 6°13′19″W	Category B	18675	Upload Photo
20 Bayhead				58°12′45″N 6°23′15″W	Category C(S)	41675	Upload Photo
31-35 Odd Nos Cromwell Street				58°12′33″N 6°23′17″W	Category C(S)	41680	Upload Photo
4 Goathill Crescent Including Boundary Walls And Railings				58°12′44″N 6°22′53″W	Category B	41694	Upload another image
Keith Street Industrial Female School				58°12′40″N 6°23′12″W	Category B	41702	Upload Photo
Matheson Road And Scotland Street, Free Presbyterian Church Including Boundary Walls, Gates And Railings				58°12′42″N 6°23′00″W	Category B	41730	Upload another image
8 North Beach				58°12′30″N 6°23′28″W	Category B	41734	Upload Photo
South Beach, Cromwell Street And Point Street, Municipal Buildings				58°12′30″N 6°23′19″W	Category B	41738	Upload another image
Tiumpan Head Lighthouse and Attendant Buildings				58°15′39″N 6°08′21″W	Category C(S)	19209	Upload another image See more images
Gress, Old Church				58°17′26″N 6°17′03″W	Category B	18673	Upload Photo
Cromwells Building Corner Cromwell Street And Francis Street				58°12′31″N 6°23′17″W	Category B	41679	Upload Photo
23-29 (Odd Nos) Francis Street				58°12′32″N 6°23′00″W	Category C(S)	41684	Upload Photo
25 Kenneth Street				58°12′32″N 6°23′13″W	Category C(S)	41705	Upload Photo
Kenneth Street, Masonic Hall Including Boundary Walls, Gatepiers, Railings And Arch				58°12′38″N 6°23′15″W	Category C(S)	41708	Upload Photo
Lewis Street, Court House				58°12′36″N 6°23′03″W	Category B	41710	Upload another image
13 Matheson Road Claremont Including Boundary Walls Gates And Gatepiers				58°12′42″N 6°22′57″W	Category B	41720	Upload another image
Lews Castle Driveway Bridge Close To North End Of Mansion				58°12′43″N 6°23′40″W	Category C(S)	18827	Upload Photo
Lews Castle				58°12′42″N 6°23′39″W	Category A	18677	Upload another image See more images
67 Keith Street Including Boundary Wall And Railings				58°12′42″N 6°23′11″W	Category C(S)	50798	Upload Photo
Amity House				58°12′28″N 6°23′30″W	Category B	41674	Upload Photo
Church Street And Matheson Road Bbc Rosebank Including Boundary Walls And Railings				58°12′40″N 6°22′59″W	Category C(S)	41676	Upload Photo
50 Church Street And Lewis Street, Ta Hall Building				58°12′39″N 6°23′03″W	Category C(S)	41677	Upload Photo
Francis Street St Peter's Episcopal Church Including Perimeter Wall Gates And Gatepiers				58°12′33″N 6°22′58″W	Category B	41685	Upload another image
38 ,40 Francis Street				58°12′33″N 6°23′01″W	Category C(S)	41687	Upload another image
2 And 4 Garden Road Including Garden Boundary Wall, Gates And Railings				58°12′32″N 6°22′56″W	Category B	41690	Upload Photo
James Street And Bells Road, Old Co-Op Yard Buildings				58°12′28″N 6°22′58″W	Category C(S)	41695	Upload Photo
18, 20 James Street Including Boundary Walls Gates And Gatepiers				58°12′29″N 6°23′00″W	Category B	41697	Upload Photo
28 And 30 James Street, Park Guest House, Including Boundary Walls, Gates And Gatepiers				58°12′31″N 6°22′56″W	Category B	41700	Upload Photo
24 ,26 Lewis Street				58°12′37″N 6°23′06″W	Category C(S)	41713	Upload Photo
Matheson Road And Goathill Road, High Church Including Boundary Walls, Gatepiers And Railings				58°12′39″N 6°22′56″W	Category B	41722	Upload another image
6 Matheson Road, Balone, Including Boundary Walls Gate And Railings				58°12′36″N 6°22′57″W	Category B	41724	Upload Photo
14 Matheson Road Including Boundary Walls Gates And Railings				58°12′46″N 6°23′02″W	Category B	41726	Upload Photo
23 Matheson Street And Robertson Road, Including Boundary Walls, Gates And Railings				58°12′46″N 6°22′59″W	Category B	41731	Upload Photo
Springfield Road School Block And Adjoining Hall				58°12′37″N 6°22′52″W	Category C(S)	41741	Upload another image
Ui Church And Graveyard (St Columba's)				58°12′26″N 6°17′00″W	Category A	19210	Upload another image
Lews Castle Creed Lodge Including Gateway And Driveway Bridge Nearby				58°12′20″N 6°25′10″W	Category C(S)	18816	Upload Photo
Knockgarry				58°12′26″N 6°21′42″W	Category C(S)	18676	Upload Photo
16, 18 Cromwell Street, The Town House				58°12′32″N 6°23′18″W	Category B	41682	Upload another image
Matheson Road And 37 Church Street Barvas Lodge Including Boundary Walls Gates And Gatepiers				58°12′39″N 6°22′59″W	Category B	41729	Upload another image
Lewis War Memorial				58°13′19″N 6°24′01″W	Category B	19211	Upload another image See more images
36 Francis Street				58°12′33″N 6°23′02″W	Category C(S)	41688	Upload Photo
29 Kenneth Street				58°12′33″N 6°23′13″W	Category C(S)	41706	Upload Photo
15 Matheson Road The Sheiling, Including Boundary Walls, Gate And Railings				58°12′43″N 6°22′58″W	Category C(S)	41721	Upload Photo
8 Matheson Road, Park House, Including Boundary Walls, Gates And Gatepiers				58°12′37″N 6°22′58″W	Category B	41725	Upload Photo
18 Matheson Road				58°12′48″N 6°23′03″W	Category B	41728	Upload Photo
North Beach Lewis Hotel				58°12′30″N 6°23′27″W	Category B	41732	Upload Photo
32 Scotland Street				58°12′43″N 6°23′01″W	Category B	41737	Upload Photo
Springfield Road Tower Of Nicolson Institute				58°12′32″N 6°22′51″W	Category B	41742	Upload another image
Garry Bridge, Beyond Tolsta				58°22′13″N 6°13′25″W	Category B	18672	Upload another image See more images
7 James Street				58°12′28″N 6°23′01″W	Category B	41696	Upload Photo
32 James Street Tower Guest House Including Perimeter Walls, Gates And Railings				58°12′31″N 6°22′55″W	Category C(S)	41701	Upload Photo
Kenneth Street And Francis Street, Martins Memorial Church And Hall Including Boundary Walls, Gates And Railings				58°12′31″N 6°23′10″W	Category B	41703	Upload another image
Kenneth Street Free Church				58°12′34″N 6°23′12″W	Category C(S)	41707	Upload Photo
Matheson Road And Springfield Road, Springfield House				58°12′35″N 6°22′54″W	Category B	41716	Upload Photo
7 Matheson Road Including Boundary Walls, Gates And Gatepiers				58°12′38″N 6°22′55″W	Category B	41718	Upload another image
16 Matheson Road, Free Presbyterian Manse, Including Boundary Walls, Gates And Railings				58°12′47″N 6°23′02″W	Category B	41727	Upload Photo
Porter's Lodge, Lews Castle Lodge At Bayhead, Including Quadrant Walls				58°12′57″N 6°23′13″W	Category B	18815	Upload another image See more images
Tong, Tong Farmhouse, Former Parish Church Manse Including Gatepiers				58°14′21″N 6°21′08″W	Category C(S)	50803	Upload Photo
16 Francis Street, Post Office Building				58°12′32″N 6°23′11″W	Category B	41686	Upload Photo
7 Kenneth Street Religious Book Shop				58°12′32″N 6°23′14″W	Category B	41704	Upload Photo
Lewis Street And Church Street, St Columba's Old Parish Church				58°12′37″N 6°23′02″W	Category B	41711	Upload another image See more images
31 ,33 Lewis Street, Including Garden Walls And Railings				58°12′42″N 6°23′06″W	Category B	41712	Upload Photo
Matheson Road And Springfield Road, School Block				58°12′34″N 6°22′53″W	Category B	41715	Upload another image
Lews Castle, Lodges, Boundary Walls, Sea Walls And Tower Near Stornoway Harbour Including Cuddy Point				58°12′36″N 6°23′30″W	Category A	19206	Upload another image
Lews Castle, Matheson Memorial				58°12′33″N 6°23′49″W	Category B	19207	Upload another image See more images
New Tolsta, Black House (Adjacent To House At Number 48 North Tolsta)				58°21′09″N 6°12′49″W	Category C(S)	19208	Upload Photo
Lews Castle, Marybank Lodge Including Gateway				58°13′00″N 6°24′33″W	Category C(S)	18817	Upload Photo
Cnoc, Former Manse				58°12′15″N 6°16′51″W	Category B	18671	Upload Photo

== Key ==
The scheme for classifying buildings in Scotland is:

- Category A: "buildings of national or international importance, either architectural or historic; or fine, little-altered examples of some particular period, style or building type."
- Category B: "buildings of regional or more than local importance; or major examples of some particular period, style or building type, which may have been altered."
- Category C: "buildings of local importance; lesser examples of any period, style, or building type, as originally constructed or moderately altered; and simple traditional buildings which group well with other listed buildings."

In March 2016 there were 47,288 listed buildings in Scotland. Of these, 8% were Category A, and 50% were Category B, with the remaining 42% being Category C.

== See also ==
- List of listed buildings in the Outer Hebrides
