= Camuscross =

Township on the Isle of Skye in Scotland

Coordinates: 57.13948°N 5.80589°W

Camuscross: Scottish Gaelic: Camus Croise
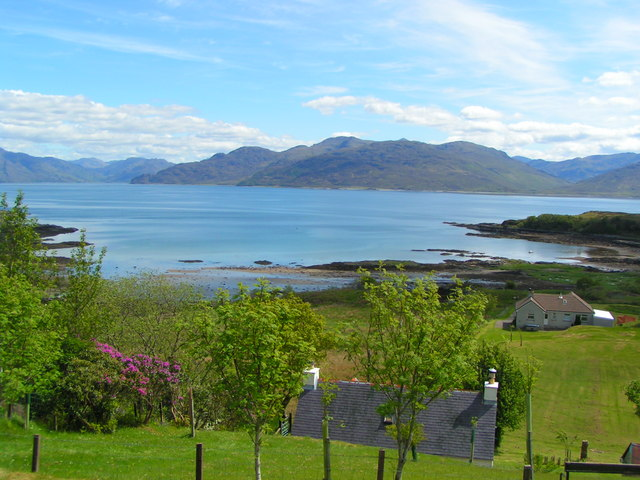
- View of the Sound of Sleat at Camuscross

- Location within the Isle of Skye
- OS grid reference: NG698118
- Council area: Highland
- Lieutenancy area: Ross and Cromarty
- Country: Scotland
- Sovereign state: United Kingdom
- Post town: ISLE OF SKYE
- Postcode district: IV43 8
- Dialling code: 01471
- Police: Scotland
- Fire: Scottish
- Ambulance: Scottish
- UK Parliament: Inverness, Skye and West Ross-shire
- Scottish Parliament: Ross, Skye and Inverness West

Camuscross (Scottish Gaelic: Camus Croise) is a small crofting township on the Isle of Skye in Scotland.

Camuscross is situated on Camus Croise bay, on the west shore of the Sound of Sleat, in the Highland Council area. It lies close to the village of Isleornsay and the island of Ornsay.

== History ==
In the early 19th century, Lord MacDonald created a township of 40 small crofts, 2 to 3 acres (0.8 to 1.2 hectares) on average. The hill grazing was less than a tenth of the size of most other Sleat townships, with many more crofters. It is thought that the crofts were deliberately made too small to live on, forcing the crofters to fish during the herring boom.

== Harbour ==
Isle Ornsay harbour was one of the most promising harbours in the whole of Skye, for a time the main connection to the mainland. Isle Ornsay post office, situated where the estate office now is, was the main post office for the whole of Sleat.

Isle Ornsay harbour saw the departure of emigration ships. The William Nichol, a government emigration ship left on 6 July 1837, bound for Australia as part of "Langs" Bounty Scheme. Conditions on the voyage were poor, with the deaths of 19 children and 2 adults from a manifest of over 300. The Sillery departed on 7 September 1853 for Canada, including 332 people from Knoydart and the Glengary estates, who had been cleared to make way for sheep. Houses were burnt and levelled to the ground. Four young men from Inverguseran 'escaped' over the hills to Lochaber.

== Camuscross Community Initiative ==
Camuscross Community Steering Group was set up in February 2007 to develop various projects for community benefits. It is working on affordable house sites, a network of heritage paths with interpretation, and hoping to build a local shop and cafe. The group has been researching local history and has collected a number of place names from local people. It publishes a newsletter called An Lianag – after the name of the green in the middle of the village, which is where the crofters traditionally met to discuss township matters.

The Steering Group organise the Camuscross Crofting Olympics, an afternoon of serious and not-so-serious competitions in August.

It became a community company, becoming incorporated on 22 December 2008, with the name of Camuscross Community Initiative. When the company decided to add the neighbouring crofting township to its area of benefit, it became Camuscross & Duisdale Initiative.
