= List of listed buildings in Sleat, Highland =

This is a list of listed buildings in the parish of Sleat in Highland, Scotland.

== List ==
Name	Location	Date Listed	Grid Ref. (Note: Sometimes known as OSGB36, the grid reference (where provided) is based on the British national grid reference system used by the Ordnance Survey. • "Guide to National Grid". Ordnance Survey. • "Get-a-map". Ordnance Survey.)	Geo-coordinates	Notes	LB Number (Note: Historic Environment Scotland assign a unique alphanumeric identifier to each designated site in Scotland, for listed buildings this always begins with "LB", for example "LB12345".)	Image
Pier, Crane, Well And Doocot Eilean Iarmain (Isleornsay)				57°08′45″N 5°47′55″W	Category B	19489	Upload Photo
Former Parish Church, Kilmore, And Graveyard				57°05′38″N 5°52′06″W	Category B	13981	Upload Photo
Ardvaser Former Porter's Lodge To Armadale Castle				57°03′44″N 5°54′12″W	Category B	14002	Upload Photo
Ostaig Farm Square Known As Sabhal Mor Ostaig (Cola - Isde Gaidhlig - Gaelic College And Cottage				57°05′11″N 5°52′52″W	Category B	13985	Upload Photo
Armadale Castle Laundry				57°04′22″N 5°53′55″W	Category C(S)	14006	Upload Photo
Armadale Castle Home Farm, The High Square				57°04′33″N 5°53′42″W	Category B	14007	Upload Photo
Kylerhea Old Inn				57°13′31″N 5°39′54″W	Category B	13984	Upload Photo
Armadale Castle				57°04′21″N 5°53′41″W	Category B	14003	Upload another image
Upper Ostaig House				57°05′06″N 5°53′14″W	Category B	13986	Upload Photo
Tigh A' Chnuic Agus (And) Sabhal A'Chnuic				57°06′47″N 5°50′55″W	Category B	13983	Upload Photo
Armadale Castle Stables				57°04′11″N 5°53′49″W	Category A	14004	Upload another image
Kilmore Church (Sleat Parish Church, Church Of Scotland)				57°05′37″N 5°52′08″W	Category C(S)	13979	Upload Photo
Bridge By Armadale Castle				57°04′17″N 5°53′47″W	Category B	14005	Upload Photo
Macdonald Mausoleum				57°05′38″N 5°52′06″W	Category C(S)	13980	Upload Photo
Kilmore Manse (Sleat Parish Church Manse)				57°05′32″N 5°52′21″W	Category B	13982	Upload Photo
Isle Ornsay Lighthouse, Eilean Sionnach				57°08′37″N 5°46′56″W	Category B	14008	Upload Photo

== Key ==
The scheme for classifying buildings in Scotland is:

- Category A: "buildings of national or international importance, either architectural or historic; or fine, little-altered examples of some particular period, style or building type."
- Category B: "buildings of regional or more than local importance; or major examples of some particular period, style or building type, which may have been altered."
- Category C: "buildings of local importance; lesser examples of any period, style, or building type, as originally constructed or moderately altered; and simple traditional buildings which group well with other listed buildings."

In March 2016 there were 47,288 listed buildings in Scotland. Of these, 8% were Category A, and 50% were Category B, with the remaining 42% being Category C.

== See also ==
- List of listed buildings in Highland
