= Stornoway Sheriff Court =

Judicial building in Stornoway, Scotland

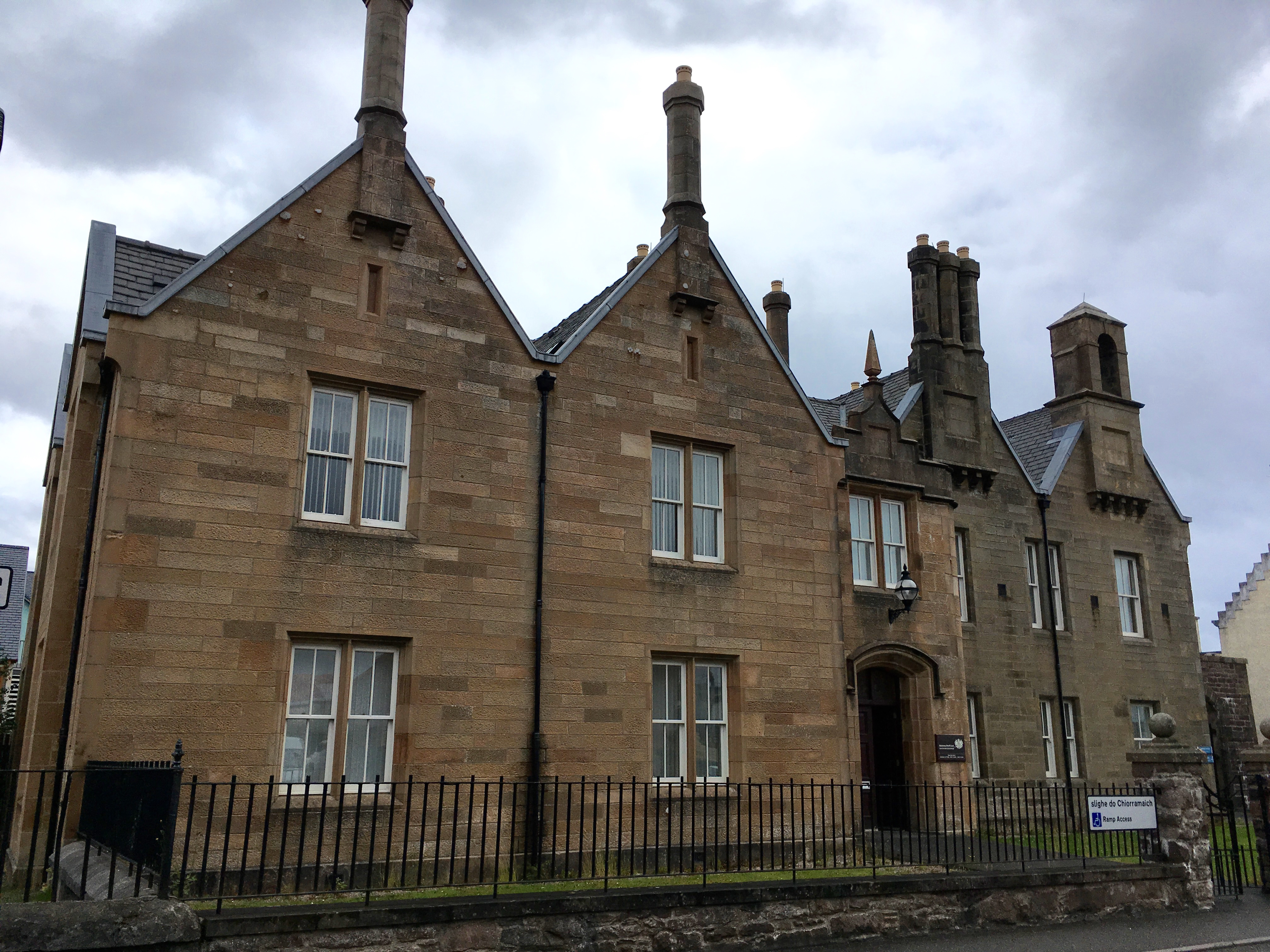
- The building in 2018

- Shown on Lewis
- 58.2098°N 6.3841°W
- Location: Lewis Street, Stornoway

History
- Built: 1843

Site notes
- Architect: Thomas Brown II
- Architectural style: Tudor Revival style

Listed Building – Category B
- Official name: Stornoway Sheriff Court and Former Jail, including boundary walls, archway and railings, Lewis Street, Stornoway
- Designated: 27 November 1989
- Reference no.: LB41710

Stornoway Sheriff Court is a judicial building on Lewis Street in Stornoway in Scotland. The building, which continues to be used as a courthouse, is a Category B listed building.

== History ==
In the early 1840s, civic officials decided to commission a prison block for the area. The site they selected was on the east side of Lewis Street. The new building was designed by Thomas Brown II in the Tudor Revival style, built in ashlar stone, and was completed in 1843. It contained a series of prison cells with high horizontal windows. The complex was extended forward, with a new courthouse added at the front, to a design by Andrew Maitland in 1870.

The design involved an asymmetrical main frontage of five bays facing onto Lewis Street. The first two bays, which were projected forward, were fenestrated by bipartite mullioned on both floors and gabled, with lancet windows in the gables, and chimney stacks at the apex of the gables. The third bay, which was slightly projected forward, featured a segmental headed doorway with a hood mould on the ground floor, a bipartite mullioned window on the first floor, and a small pediment with a finial above. The last two bays were fenestrated with sash windows on both floors, and gabled, with a chimney stack at the apex of left-hand gable, and a bellcote at the apex of the right-hand gable. Internally, the principal rooms were the offices, with vaulted ceilings, on the ground floor, and the main courtroom on the first floor.

In April 1891, the courthouse was the venue for the trial of a group of crofters who had sought to occupy the land at Orinsay that their ancestors had farmed before the clearances in 1843. A total of 15 of the crofters were found guilty and imprisoned for trespass. The principal landowner, William Lever, 1st Viscount Leverhulme, eventually allowed the land to be broken up into small holdings in the early 1920s.

In February 1919, the building was the venue for the public inquiry into the loss of the steam yacht, HMY Iolaire, which had been wrecked in a storm at the mouth of Stornoway harbour on New Year's Day 1919. The disaster killed more than 200 people, including many of the young men of the isles of Lewis and Harris. The jury found that the officer in charge did not exercise sufficient prudence in approaching the harbour, and that the boat failed to slow down.

The building continues to serve as the venue for sheriff court hearings in the area, although, due to staffing issues with the escort services, hearings involving juries were moved to the mainland in July 2023.

== See also ==
- List of listed buildings in Stornoway
