= Isleornsay =

Coordinates: 57.14569°N 5.80902°W

Isleornsay: Scottish Gaelic: Eilean Iarmain
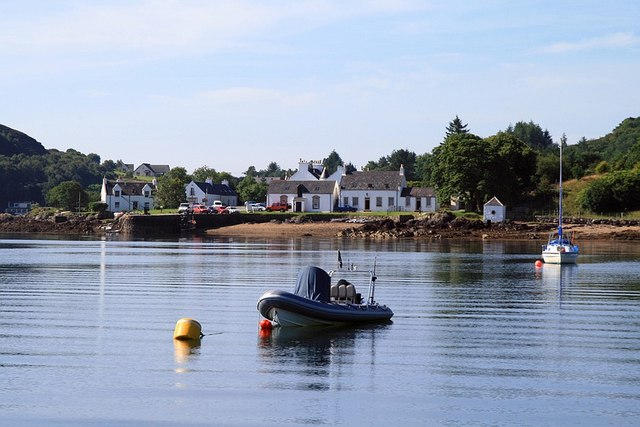
- Isleornsay

- Location within the Isle of Skye
- OS grid reference: NG696125
- Council area: Highland
- Lieutenancy area: Ross and Cromarty
- Country: Scotland
- Sovereign state: United Kingdom
- Post town: ISLE OF SKYE
- Postcode district: IV43 8
- Dialling code: 01471
- Police: Scotland
- Fire: Scottish
- Ambulance: Scottish
- UK Parliament: Inverness, Skye and West Ross-shire
- Scottish Parliament: Skye, Lochaber and Badenoch

Isleornsay (Scottish Gaelic: Eilean Iarmain) is a village lying off the main Armadale to Sleat road (the A851) on the Isle of Skye in Scotland. It overlooks, but is not upon, the island of Ornsay. The island itself shelters one of the best natural harbours in southern Skye. The location was exploited from the 18th century or earlier by the MacDonalds who owned this part of Skye.

There is a hotel in the village called Hotel Eilean Iarmain and a local company Pràban na Linne founded by Iain Noble which produces a vatted malt whisky called Poit Dhubh (literally the "Black Pot" or "Illicit Still" and two blends, Tè Bheag nan Eilean ("small dram of the islands") and Mac na Mara (the "Son of the Sea").

== Emigration ==
Emigration from the Highlands and Islands was endemic in the 19th century and the company that ran the Isleornsay store, MacDonald and Elder, acted as emigration agents from the early 1800s. In 1822 they advertised that they were able "to fit out transports for the conveyance of passengers from Inverness & the West Coast" of Scotland to the east coast of Canada. In the 1830s a programme of assisted passages to Australia from the Sleat peninsula was organised. The William Nicol sailed to Sydney from Isleornsay in July 1837 with 322 passengers including 70 families from Sleat. At the time it was reported that so many local people wished to emigrate that the ship could not accommodate all those who wanted to embark.

== Railway ==
In 1898, the proposed Hebridean Light Railway Company was to have terminated at a new ferry port at Isleornsay, but the line was never constructed.

== See also ==
- Camuscross
