= Hebridean Light Railway Company =

UK business

Coordinates: 57°35′26″N 6°21′30″W

The Hebridean Light Railway Company proposed to operate on the Scottish islands of Skye and Lewis. The Skye line was to have connected the port of Isleornsay (for ferries from Mallaig on the Scottish mainland) and the port of Uig on the north-west coast of the island, from where ferries would have sailed to Stornoway on Lewis. Another line was then proposed to link Stornoway to Carloway, the second settlement of Lewis. Branch lines were also proposed to Breasclete and Dunvegan.

The line was proposed in 1898, but was never completed. Records of the proposals are held in the National Archives at Kew.
