= HMY Iolaire =

British armed yacht wrecked in 1919

Coordinates: 58.18774°N 6.34971°W

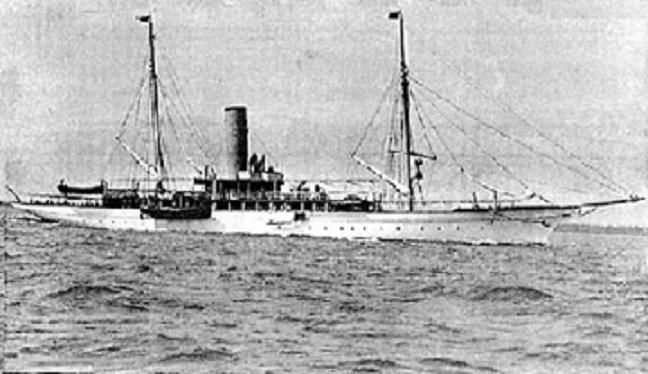
- The yacht as Amalthæa in 1908

History
- Name: 1881: Iolanthe; 1898: Mione; 1900: Iolanthe; 1907: Amalthæa; 1918: Iolaire
- Namesake: 1898: Violet Hermione Graham; 1907: the nymph Amaltheia; 1918: Scottish Gaelic for "eagle"
- Owner: 1881: Thomas J Waller; 1889: Mortimer Singer; 1890: Donald Currie; 1898: Douglas Graham; 1899: James Horlick; 1906: Florence Calvert; 1907: Charles Assheton-Smith; 1918: Vivian Newton
- Operator: 1915: (United Kingdom) Royal Navy
- Port of registry: 1881: (United Kingdom) London; 1889: (United States) New York; 1890: (United Kingdom) London
- Builder: Ramage & Ferguson, Leith
- Yard number: 28
- Launched: 30 April 1881
- Identification: UK official number 85043; 1882: code letters WBHD; 1898: code letters PVWQ; 1915: pennant number 065
- Fate: wrecked, 1 January 1919

General characteristics
- Type: steam yacht
- Tonnage: 1882: 412 GRT, 261 NRT; 1892: 415 GRT, 204 NRT
- Length: 189.3 ft (57.7 m)
- Beam: 27.1 ft (8.3 m)
- Depth: 15.0 ft (4.6 m)
- Installed power: 110 NHP
- Propulsion: 1 × compound engine; 1 × screw
- Sail plan: 2-masted schooner
- Armament: 1915: 2 × 3-inch guns

HMY Iolaire was an iron-hulled steam yacht that was launched in Scotland in 1881 as Iolanthe. She was renamed Mione in 1898; Iolanthe in 1900; and Amalthæa (Note: Also spelt Amalthea or Amalthaea. The original Ancient Greek spelling is Ἀμάλθεια. See "Owners and registration" section.) in 1907. Between 1881 and 1915 a succession of industrialists and aristocrats had owned the yacht. She was commissioned into the Royal Navy in 1915 as HMY Amalthaea, and renamed HMY Iolaire in 1918. She was wrecked in a storm at the mouth of Stornoway harbour on New Year's Day 1919. More than 200 people died in the disaster, including many of the young men of the isles of Lewis and Harris. UK law now protects her wreck as a war grave.

== Building ==
Ramage & Ferguson of Leith on the Firth of Forth built the yacht at yard number 28, and launched her on 30 April 1881. Her registered length was 189.3 ft (57.7 m), her beam was 27.1 ft (8.3 m), and her depth was 15.0 ft (4.6 m). Her tonnages were 412 GRT and 261 NRT. She had a single screw, driven by a two-cylinder compound engine that was made by Matthew Paul & Co of Dumbarton and rated at 110 NHP. She had two masts, and was rigged as a schooner.

== Owners and registration ==
The yacht's first name was Iolanthe, a woman's forename. It predates Gilbert and Sullivan's use of the name for their comic opera Iolanthe, which was premiered in 1882. Iolanthe's first owner was a Thomas J Waller of Holland Park, London. She was registered in London. Her United Kingdom official number was 85043, and her code letters were WBHD.

By 1889 Mortimer Singer, son of the sewing machine manufacturer Isaac Singer, had acquired Iolanthe and registered her in New York. By 1890 Sir Donald Currie, founder of the Castle Mail Packet Company, had acquired her, and reverted her registration to London. By 1892 her tonnages had been revised to 415 GRT and 204 NRT.

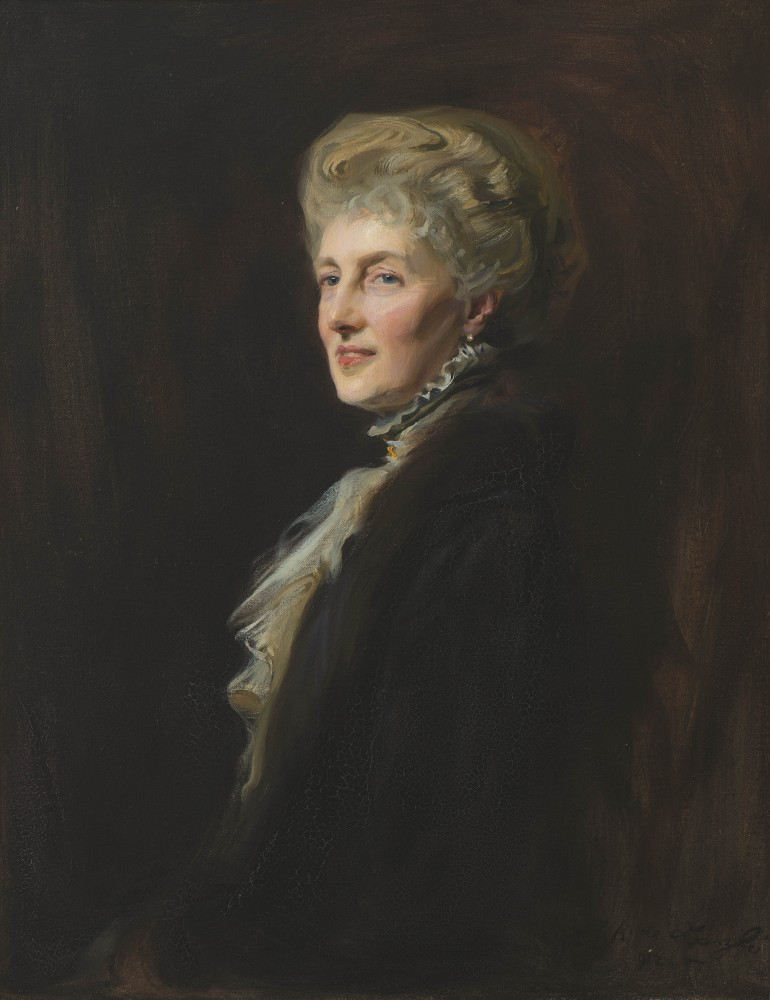
Violet Graham, Duchess of Montrose, painted in 1912 by Philip de László

By 1898 Douglas Graham, 5th Duke of Montrose had acquired her and renamed her Mione, and her code letters had been changed to PVWQ. "Mione" is an abbreviation of Hermione, the middle name of the Duke's wife, Violet Graham, Duchess of Montrose. By 1900 Horlicks proprietor Sir James Horlick, 1st Baronet had acquired the yacht and reverted her name to Iolanthe. By 1906 a Mrs Florence Calvert of Eton Avenue, Belsize Park, London had acquired her.

By 1907 Sir Charles Assheton-Smith, 1st Baronet, of Vaynol Park in Caernarfonshire, had acquired the yacht. He renamed her after Amaltheia, a nymph in Greek mythology. The Mercantile Navy List records the name as Amalthæa, with an "æ" ligature. Lloyd's Register at first spelt it Amalthea, but by 1909 had changed it to Amalthaea. Assheton-Smith died in 1914, but Amalthæa remained registered in his name until 1918. In 1919, after she had been wrecked, the Mercantile Navy List recorded her owner as a Vivian L Newton of Manchester. He may have acquired her in 1918.

== Armed yacht ==
In the First World War the Admiralty requisitioned the yacht, and armed her with two 3-inch guns. She was commissioned into the Navy as HMY Amalthaea, with the pennant number 065, and entered service on 14 February 1915. She was based at Great Yarmouth. In November 1918 she was transferred to Stornoway to replace an armed yacht called Iolaire (Scottish Gaelic for 'Eagle'), (Note: Scottish Gaelic pronunciation: [ˈjul̪ˠɪɾə] or Scottish Gaelic pronunciation: [ˈjul̪ˠɪðə], varying slightly according to dialect. The English-speaking crew used a spelling pronunciation of /ˈaɪ.əlɛər/, and this was also adopted by Gaelic speakers.) which was the flagship of the anti-submarine patrol based there. The two ships swapped names.

== Loss ==
Many young men from the Isle of Lewis served in the Royal Navy in the First World War. In the last week of December 1918, hundreds of them were granted leave from the naval bases at Devonport and Portsmouth. On New Year's Eve, 31 December 1918, they were heading for Kyle of Lochalsh on two trains. The regular MacBrayne ferry between Kyle of Lochalsh and Stornoway, the 280 GRT Sheila, was too small to carry so many passengers in one trip, so the Navy had sent Iolaire to Kyle of Lochalsh to meet the trains. Iolaire was short-handed, as about half of her crew were on leave for Christmas. She reached Kyle of Lochalsh about 16:00 hrs. The two trains reached Kyle of Lochalsh railway station at 18:15 hrs and 19:00 hrs. About 320 men alighted from the two trains. About 27 or 30 embarked on Sheila, and 260 or 290 on Iolaire. Sources differ as to precise numbers, but either way, Iolaire was overloaded. She left Kyle of Lochalsh about 19:30 hrs, and Sheila followed about half an hour later.

Iolaire would have been steaming at about 10 knots (19 km/h). She steamed north out of Inner Sound, past South Rona, and out into The Minch. From midnight the wind freshened and became squally. At midnight the watch aboard the yacht changed. On her bridge a James McLean took over as helmsman; and the Navigating Officer, Lieutenant Cotter, relieved the commanding officer, Commander Mason. Mason retired to his cabin. McLean spent one hour at the helm, until another man relieved him at 01:00 hrs.

The wind was coming from the south, astern of Iolaire, and freshened as she neared Stornoway harbour. McLean testified that he sighted Arnish Point lighthouse, at the harbour mouth, about half a point (slightly more than 5.6 degrees) off her port bow. The yacht overtook a fishing vessel, Spider, off the mouth of Loch Grimshader, south of Stornoway. Spider was also heading for Stornoway, and now followed Iolaire. Spider's skipper, James MacDonald, testified that Iolaire's course was too far to starboard, bringing her too close to land on the east side of the harbour mouth. In his statement, MacDonald declared "I noticed that the vessel did not alter her course… but kept straight on in the direction of the Beasts of Holm. I remarked to one of the crew that the vessel would not clear the headland at Holm..."

At about 01:50 hrs Iolaire struck a group of rocks called the Beasts of Holm ("Biastan Thuilm" in Scottish Gaelic). The yacht listed heavily to starboard, and between 50 and 60 men were thrown into the sea. The yacht was equipped with wireless telegraphy, but its operator "found it impossible to get it to work on the night of the accident". Iolaire gave a distress signal with her steam whistle, and Commander Mason fired distress flares.

At the coastal artillery battery on Battery Point, signalman William Saunders was on duty from midnight to 04:00 hrs. He saw the lights of two ships approaching Stornoway, and thought that one of them was too far east to be on a correct course to enter port. At 01:50 hrs he saw a vessel off Holm Head display blue light, which is a signal that means "I require a pilot". At 02:15 hrs he saw the vessel fire a red rocket flare, which was a distress signal. Saunders replied in Morse code with a signal lamp, but got no reply.

== Rescue and aftermath ==
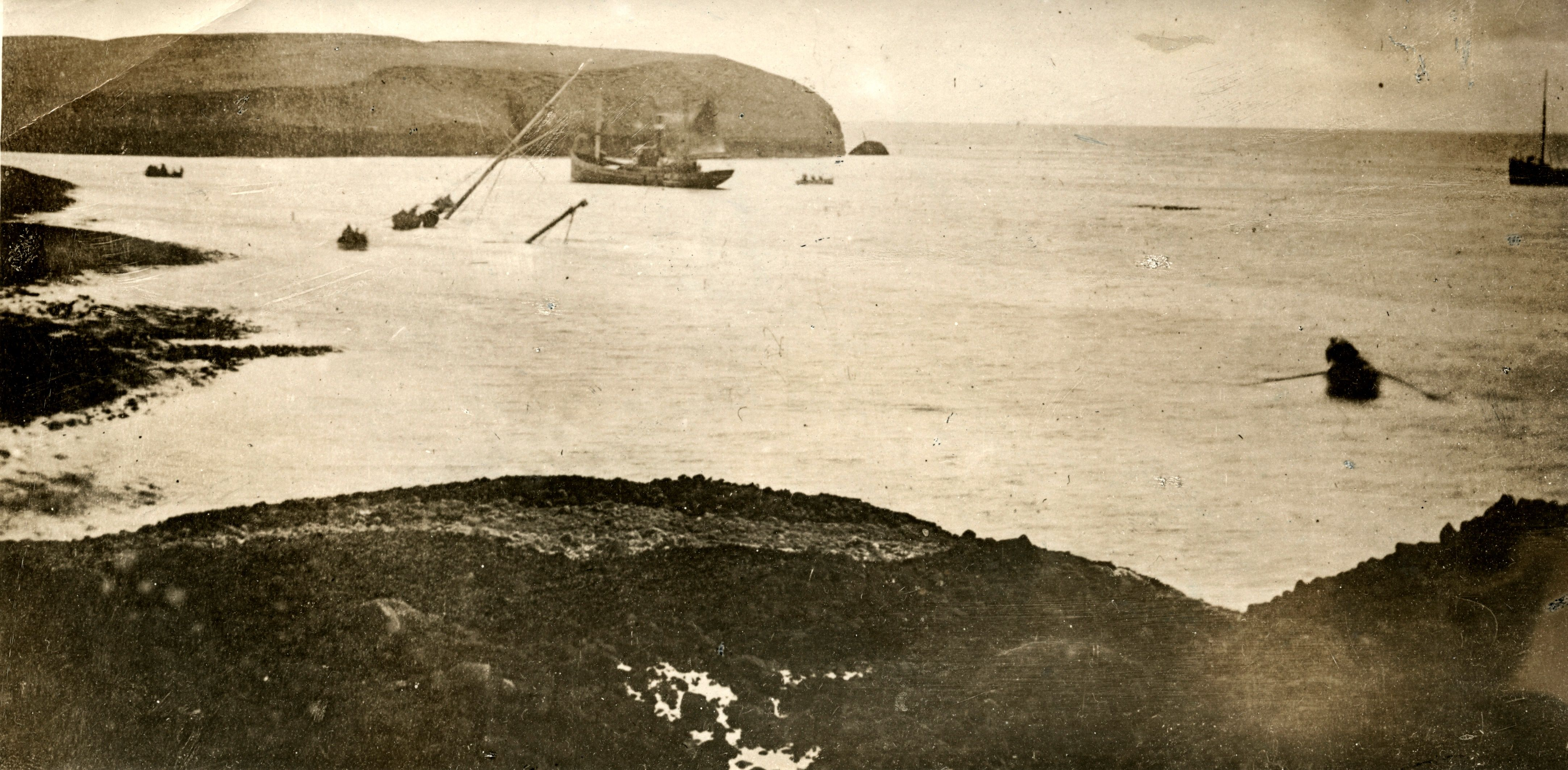
View from land of where Iolaire was wrecked. Her two masts are visible centre left, with a fishing steamer just beyond.

Strong waves struck the yacht, and she swung beam-on to the shore, coming to rest between the shore and the Beasts of Holm, with her stern only about 20 yards (18 m) from land. One man, 32-year-old John Finlay Macleod, swam ashore carrying a "heaving line". This was a lightweight rope by which a heavier hawser could be pulled ashore from the yacht. Macleod reached the land about 02:25 hrs. Once one end of the hawser had been pulled ashore, between 30 and 40 men reached land by working their way along the hawser. However, "mountainous waves" were breaking over the yacht, and some men lost their grip on the rope and were swept away. At about 03:15 hrs a wave toppled the yacht over to port, pulling the hawser back into the sea, and leaving Iolaire submerged apart from her two masts. The sea swept away those men who were still clinging to the hawser and trying to reach land.

At about 03:00 hrs one survivor reached the farmhouse at Stoneyfield, north of Holm Point. Others followed, and the farmers, Anderson Young and his wife, treated them for hypothermia. Some of the toughest and least hypothermic of the survivors then walked to Stornoway to raise the alarm. Five of them reached Stornoway by 03:30 hrs.

The Coxswain and Secretary of Stornoway Lifeboat Station were summoned, but the senior Royal Navy officer in the town, Rear Admiral Boyle, told them that it would be impossible for their lifeboat to get near enough to the shore to rescue survivors. Instead, Boyle summoned His Majesty's Coastguard and ordered that "life-saving apparatus" (presumably a Breeches buoy) be taken to Holm Head. A party carrying the apparatus left the barracks in Stornoway by 03:50. However, unbeknown to them, by then the yacht had rolled over and sunk, making use of shore-based apparatus impractical.

After 09:00 hrs, a survivor was seen clinging to one of Iolaire's masts. This was 20-year-old Donald Morrison, who had climbed the mast several hours earlier. A motorboat commanded by a naval lieutenant was sent to him. At first the sea was too rough to come close enough to rescue him. By about 10:00 hrs the sea had subsided enough, and the boat's crew helped him aboard.

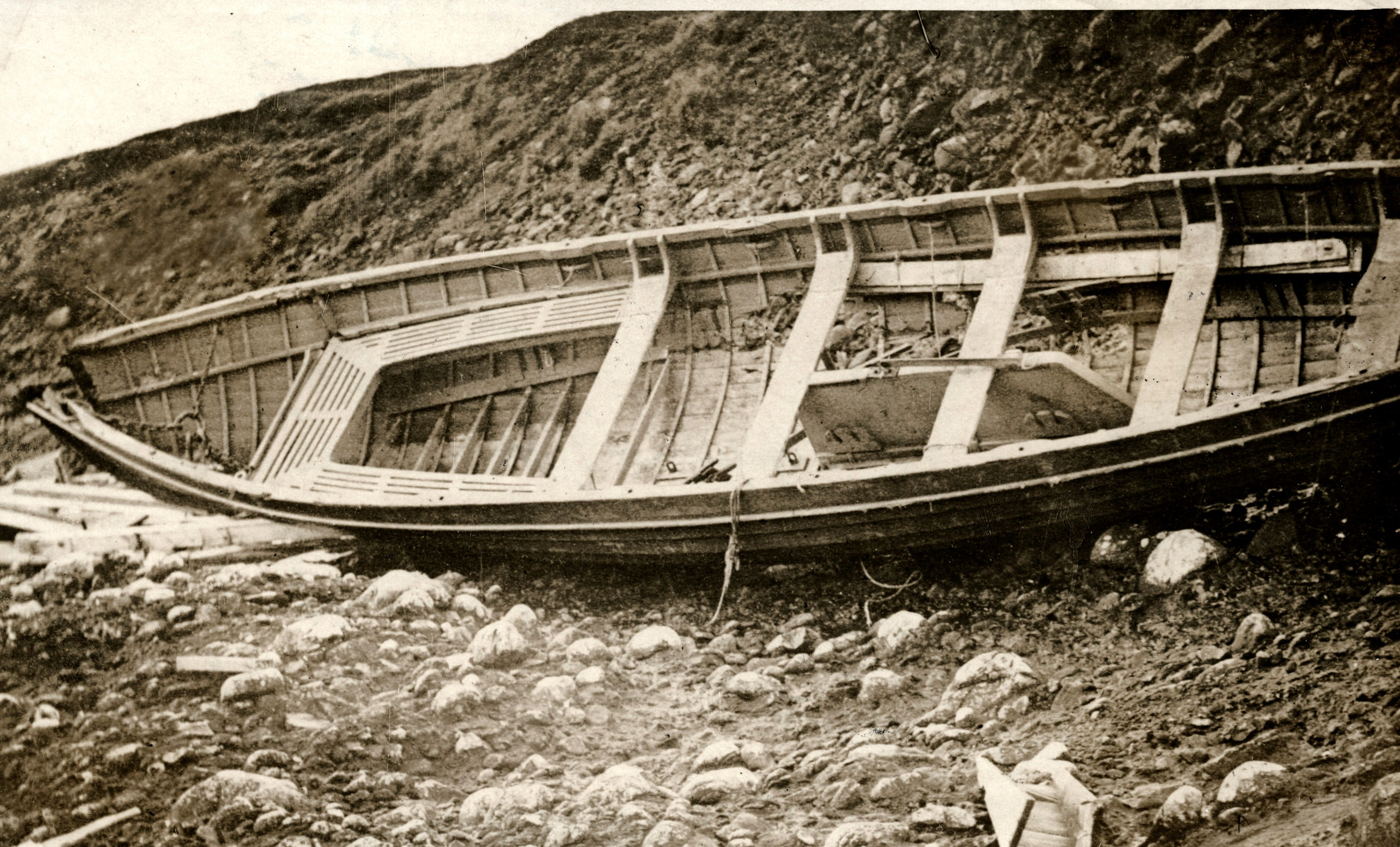
One of Iolaire's boats

Sources differ as to precise numbers, but 201 or 205 men were killed, and 79 or 82 survived. It was the greatest peacetime loss of life in United Kingdom waters since the wreck of Norge off Rockall in 1904, and the greatest peacetime loss of life involving a UK-registered ship since the sinking of RMS Titanic in 1912. Lieutenant Cotter, whose navigational error caused the shipwreck, was among the dead. So was the helmsman who relieved McLean at 01:00 hrs, and who would still have been at the helm when the yacht struck the rocks.

When the First World War began, about 29,000 people were living on Lewis and Harris. Many of them were members of the Royal Naval Reserve. In the course of the war, between 6,200 and 7,000 islanders enlisted for active service. 800 to 1,000 had been killed by the time of the Armistice of 11 November 1918. Another 200-plus killed by the Iolaire disaster further depleted that generation of young men in the two islands. Bodies were washed ashore and buried for some time after the shipwreck, but the remains of 56 of the victims were never found.

Less than a fortnight after the disaster, the Admiralty tried to sell the wreck. At that time, the bodies of 80 of the men were still missing. Rear Admiral Boyle told the Admiralty that islanders "resent the wreck being sold while the bodies remain still unrecovered". The Admiralty withdrew the wreck from sale.

== Naval court of inquiry ==
A Naval Court of Inquiry was held on 8 January 1919. It reported its findings to the Admiralty, but they were not published until 1970. The shipwreck took place on Hogmanay, but the Inquiry concluded that drinking had not contributed to it. Clearly the yacht was off-course, but the inquiry had to consider why this was the case. Neither Cotter nor Mason had ever navigated Iolaire into Stornoway at night. The Court considered whether Cotter may have used Tiumpan Head Lighthouse to reckon his course, rather than Arnish Point Lighthouse at the mouth of Stornoway harbour. Survivors testified that between five and ten minutes before Iolaire ran aground, they felt a change in motion of the ship. The Court interpreted this as being the result of her turning half a point to port to line up to enter the harbour. She had steamed north up The Minch with the wind astern of her, and a turn to port to approach Stornoway would have brought the wind and waves to bear on the port side. The Court concluded that Iolaire was about six cables off course to the east. As a result, the half-point turn to port lined her up with the Beasts of Holm, instead of with the harbour mouth. Its verdict was that "the Officer in Charge … did not exercise sufficient prudence in approaching the harbour".

== Public inquiry ==
On 10 February 1919 a public inquiry before a jury began at Stornoway Sheriff Court. Captain Cameron, Master of the ferry Sheila, told the Court that Iolaire seemed to take a correct course up the Minch, and to have made the correct turn to port to approach Stornoway, but may have made that turn a few minutes too late, which put her on course for the Beasts of Holm instead of the harbour mouth. He also suspected that she may have failed to reduce speed. The Sheriff attached great importance to Captain Cameron's evidence. The jury reached a unanimous verdict:

That the officer in charge did not exercise sufficient prudence in approaching the harbour;
That the boat did not slow down, and that a look-out was not on duty at the time of the accident;
That the number of lifebelts, boats, and rafts was insufficient for the number of people carried;
And that no orders were given by the officers with a view to saving life; and, further,
That there was a loss of valuable time between the signals of distress and the arrival of the life-saving apparatus in the vicinity of the wreck.

The jury recommended:

1. That drastic improvements should be made immediately for the conveying of life-saving apparatus in the case of ships in distress;
2. That the Lighthouse Commissioners take into consideration the question of putting up a light on the Holm side of the harbour; and
3. That the Government will in future provide adequate and safe travelling facilities for naval ratings and soldiers.

The jury desired to add that they were satisfied no-one on board was under the influence of intoxicating liquor, and also that there was no panic on board after the vessel struck. They added a rider to their verdict, recommending that the Carnegie Trust and the Royal Humane Society consider awarding Seaman John Macleod "some token of appreciation of his conduct".

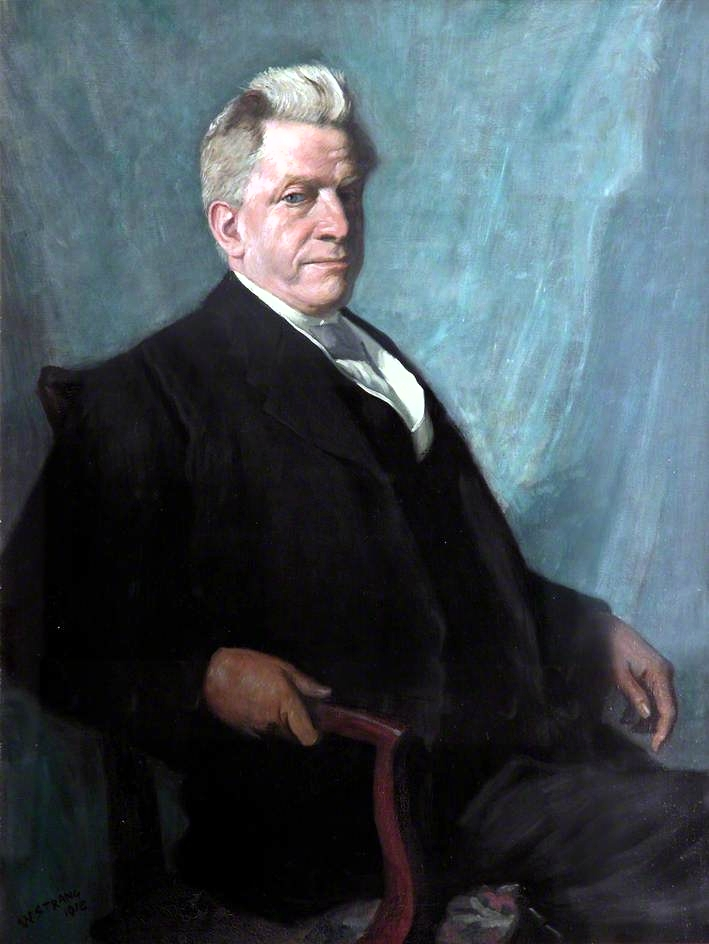
William Lever in 1918, painted by William Strang

== Disaster fund ==
An Iolaire Disaster Fund Committee was formed almost immediately, and on 7 January 1919 it was registered under the War Charities Act 1916. The first donation was £1,000 from William Lever, 1st Viscount Leverhulme, who in 1918 had bought the islands of Lewis and Harris. On 14 February 1919, a benefit concert was held in the Usher Hall, Edinburgh, and in the week 10–15 February public collections were made in all the cinemas of Edinburgh and Glasgow. In the course of 1919 the fund raised £26,116. Over the next 18 years it made relief payments to 201 families bereaved by the disaster. The last payments were in January 1938, when the last of the children of those killed reached the age of 18.

== Remembrance ==
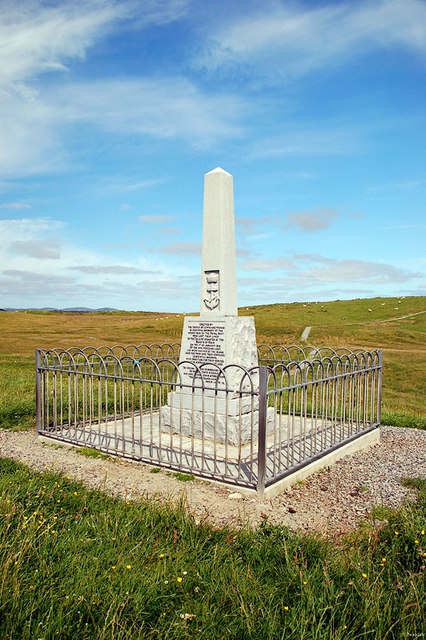
Iolaire monument at Holm

The Lewis War Memorial, an 85-foot (26 m) granite tower, commemorates all those from Lewis who died in the First World War, and was completed in 1924. A smaller granite monument, specific to the victims of Iolaire, was erected at Holm in either 1958 or 1960 (sources differ as to which year it was). The then Provost of Stornoway, Donald Stewart, attended the unveiling. It consists of an obelisk, with an inscription at the base in both Scottish Gaelic and English. It includes Psalm 77, verse 19, in Gaelic. In English in the King James Version the verse reads "Thy way is in the sea, and thy path in the great waters, and thy footsteps are not known". There is also a stone pillar marking one of the Beasts of Holm.

The dead are also commemorated on the war monuments in their home parishes on Lewis. In some cases the men killed in the Iolaire disaster are named in a separate list on their parish monument, as at Carloway, Crossbost, and Garrabost.

In March 2018 a cairn and a pictorial plaque were unveiled in Carn Gardens beside Stornoway Town Hall. The cairn consists of 201 stones, each collected from the home parish of the man it represents by school pupils of the Nicolson Institute. In November 2018, 201 trees, representing the men killed in the Iolaire disaster, was planted at Laxdale on Lewis, to form an avenue leading to the Lewis War Memorial tower. The Woodland Trust supplied saplings of hardy native species: downy birch, wych elm, bird cherry, rowan, and hazel.

The centenary of the disaster was commemorated in several ways. On 31 December 2018 a plaque was unveiled on Kyle of Lochalsh railway station, commemorating Iolaire's final sailing from the pier, and the disaster that followed. On 1 January 2019 a national commemorative service was held on Lewis. Prince Charles, Duke of Rothesay, and the First Minister of Scotland, Nicola Sturgeon, laid wreaths at the monument at Holm, and the Duke unveiled a new sculpture commemorating John Macleod. It is a bronze representation of a coil of two ropes: the heaving line with which he swam ashore, and beneath it the hawser that he hauled ashore with the heaving line.

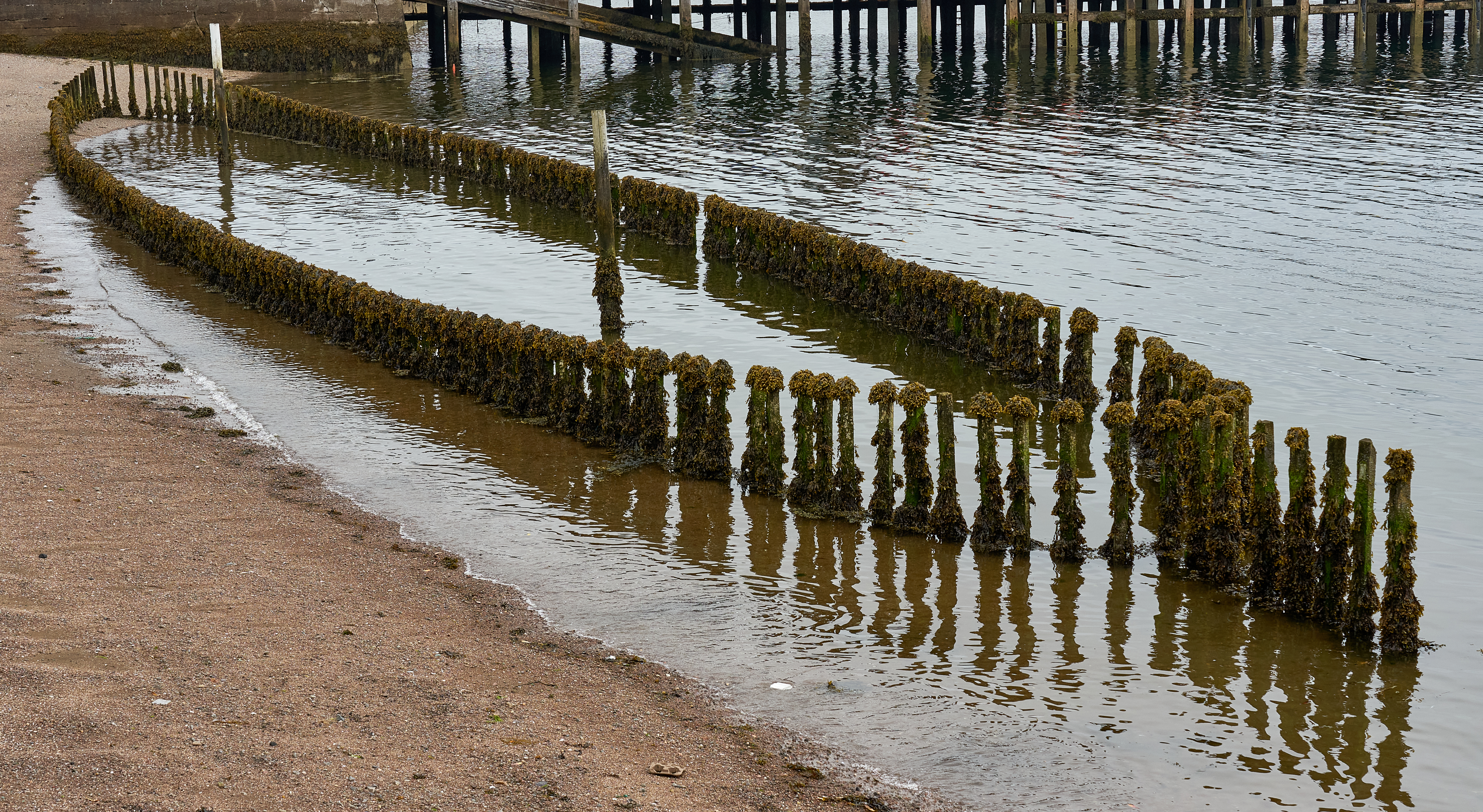
Sheol nan Iolaire, by Malcolm Maclean, in Stornoway harbour

Artist Malcolm Maclean, of Uig, Lewis, created "Sheòl an Iolaire", a sculpture in Stornoway harbour that is a life-size outline of Iolaire. It uses 280 posts to represent both the frame of the yacht's hull, and the number of men aboard. At night 201 of the posts are illuminated in blue to represent the dead, and 79 are lit in red to represent the survivors.

Ever since the disaster, artists have responded with songs and poems, including in Gaelic, which was the first language of many of the victims. For the centenary, musicians Julie Fowlis and Duncan Chisholm performed a newly composed piece of music, and artist Margaret Ferguson painted portraits of 100 of the men who were killed. The Arts and Humanities Research Council's "Living Legacies (1914–1918)" project, led by Abertay University and The Centre for History, University of the Highlands and Islands, has created an online app that expresses the nature and extent of the loss to families and communities. The disaster is also remembered in Lament for the Iolaire, a piobaireachd composed by Stornoway-born Pipe Major Donald MacLeod and published in 1978 which is regularly performed by solo pipers in competitions and recitals. MacLeod was two years old when the sinking occurred.

With effect from 2 September 2019, Iolaire's wreck is a protected war grave under the Protection of Military Remains Act 1986.

== See also ==
- List of United Kingdom disasters by death toll

== Bibliography ==
- Dòmhnallach, Tormod Calum (1978). Call na h-Iolaire (in Scottish Gaelic and English). Stornoway: Acair. ISBN 978-0-86152-000-8.
- Dowling, R (1909) [1903]. All About Ships & Shipping (3rd ed.). London: Alexander Moring Ltd.
- Lloyd's Register of Yachts. London: Lloyd's Register of Shipping. 1906 – via Internet Archive.
- Lloyd's Register of Yachts. London: Lloyd's Register of Shipping. 1907 – via Internet Archive.
- Lloyd's Register of Yachts. London: Lloyd's Register of Shipping. 1909 – via Internet Archive.
- MacLeod, John (2009). When I Heard The Bell. Edinburgh: Birlinn Press. ISBN 978-1-84158-858-2.
- Mercantile Navy List. London. 1882 – via Crew List Index Project.
- Mercantile Navy List. London. 1898 – via Crew List Index Project.
- Mercantile Navy List. London. 1907 – via Crew List Index Project.
- Mercantile Navy List. London. 1919 – via Crew List Index Project.
- Sea Sorrow: The Story of the Iolaire Disaster. Stornoway: Stornoway Gazette. 1972 [1959]. ISBN 978-0-903960-01-4.
- Yacht Register. London: Lloyd's Register of Shipping. 1882 – via Internet Archive.
- Yacht Register. London: Lloyd's Register of Shipping. 1889 – via Internet Archive.
- Yacht Register. London: Lloyd's Register of Shipping. 1890 – via Internet Archive.
- Yacht Register. London: Lloyd's Register of Shipping. 1892 – via Internet Archive.
- Yacht Register. London: Lloyd's Register of Shipping. 1898 – via Internet Archive.
- Yacht Register. London: Lloyd's Register of Shipping. 1900 – via Internet Archive.
