= An Lanntair =

Arts centre

Coordinates: 58°12′30″N 6°23′18″W

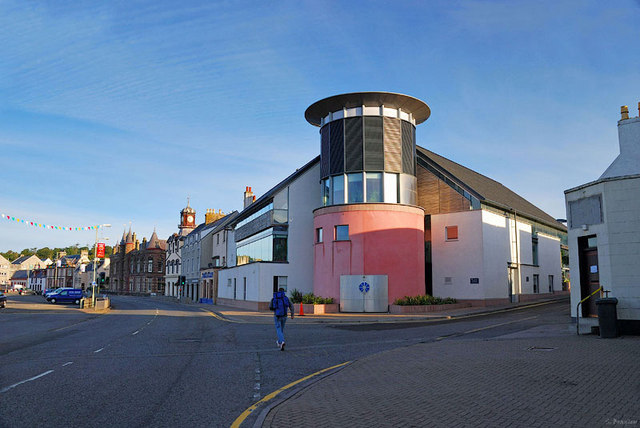
- Interactive map of the An Lanntair area

General information
- Type: Arts centre / multi-arts venue
- Location: Kenneth Street, Stornoway, Isle of Lewis, Outer Hebrides, Scotland

Other information
- Seating capacity: Auditorium: over 200 seats; Restaurant: ~50 seats

Website
- www.lanntair.com

An Lanntair (Scottish Gaelic: [əˈl̪ˠãũn̪ˠt̪ɛɾʲ]) is an arts centre in the town of Stornoway in the Outer Hebrides of Scotland. The centre is home to a cinema, and art gallery. Previously located in the Town Hall, An Lanntair moved to its current new building overlooking the harbour in September 2005. This building features a 50-seater restaurant, art gallery, shop, and auditorium seating over two hundred. The auditorium houses the first cinema in Stornoway since 1995.

An Lanntair is the principal venue for arts and entertainment events in Stornoway and regularly hosts performances by musicians as well as plays, talks, and films. It is a key venue for the annual Hebridean Celtic Festival, and has hosted events for the Royal National Mòd in 2005 and 2011.

Its name is Gaelic for the lantern.

== The Arts and entertainment ==
- Exhibitions
- Live events
- Cinema
- Workshops and education
- Shop
- Conferences

== Food Facilities ==
- Restaurant
- Café bar
- Special Functions
