= Stornoway =

Town on the Isle of Lewis, in Scotland

Stornoway: Scottish Gaelic: Steòrnabhagh
- Town and island capital
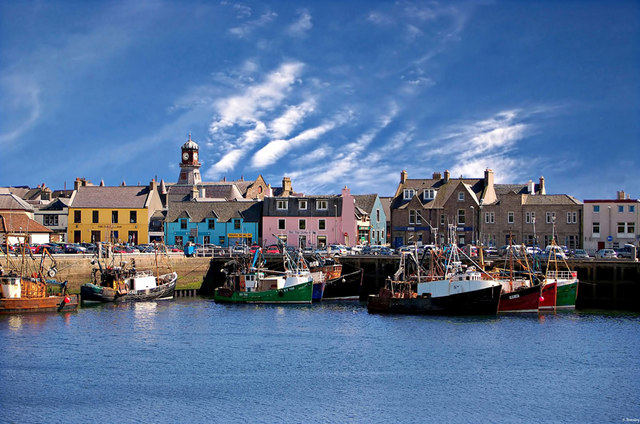
- Stornoway Harbour

- Stornoway on Lewis Stornoway on Lewis and Harris Location within the Outer Hebrides
- Area: 3.16 km^{2} (1.22 sq mi)
- Population: 6,953 (2022)
  - Density: 2,200/km^{2} (5,700/sq mi)
- Demonym: Steòrnabhach, Stornowegian
- Language: English; Scottish Gaelic
- OS grid reference: NB426340
  - Edinburgh: 197 mi (317 km)
  - London: 525 mi (845 km)
- Council area: Na h-Eileanan Siar
- Lieutenancy area: Western Isles
- Country: Scotland
- Sovereign state: United Kingdom
- Post town: STORNOWAY
- Postcode district: HS1
- Dialling code: 01851
- Police: Scotland
- Fire: Scottish
- Ambulance: Scottish
- UK Parliament: Na h-Eileanan an Iar
- Scottish Parliament: Na h-Eileanan an Iar

Stornoway (Note: /ˈstɔːrnəweɪ/; Scottish Gaelic: Steòrnabhagh [ˈʃtʲɔːrˠn̪ˠəvaɣ]) (Scottish Gaelic: Steòrnabhagh) is a port town in Scotland, the largest of the Outer Hebrides and the capital of both the Isle of Lewis and encompassing island of Lewis and Harris in Scotland.

Stornoway is the third-largest island town in Scotland's islands after Kirkwall in Orkney and Lerwick in Shetland. The historical civil parish of Stornoway, which includes various nearby villages, has a combined population of just over 10,000. The Comhairle nan Eilean Siar (the Western Isles Council) measures population in a different area: the Stornoway settlement area, Laxdale, Sandwick and Newmarket; in 2019, the estimated population for this area was 6,953.

Stornoway is an important port and the administrative centre of the Outer Hebrides. It is home to Comhairle nan Eilean Siar and a variety of educational, sporting and media establishments. Until relatively recently, observance of the Christian Sabbath (Sunday) has been associated with Hebridean culture. Recent changes mean that Sundays on Lewis now more closely resemble those in most parts of the Southern Isles, i.e. Benbecula, South Uist, Barra, and Vatersay, and on mainland Scotland.

== History ==
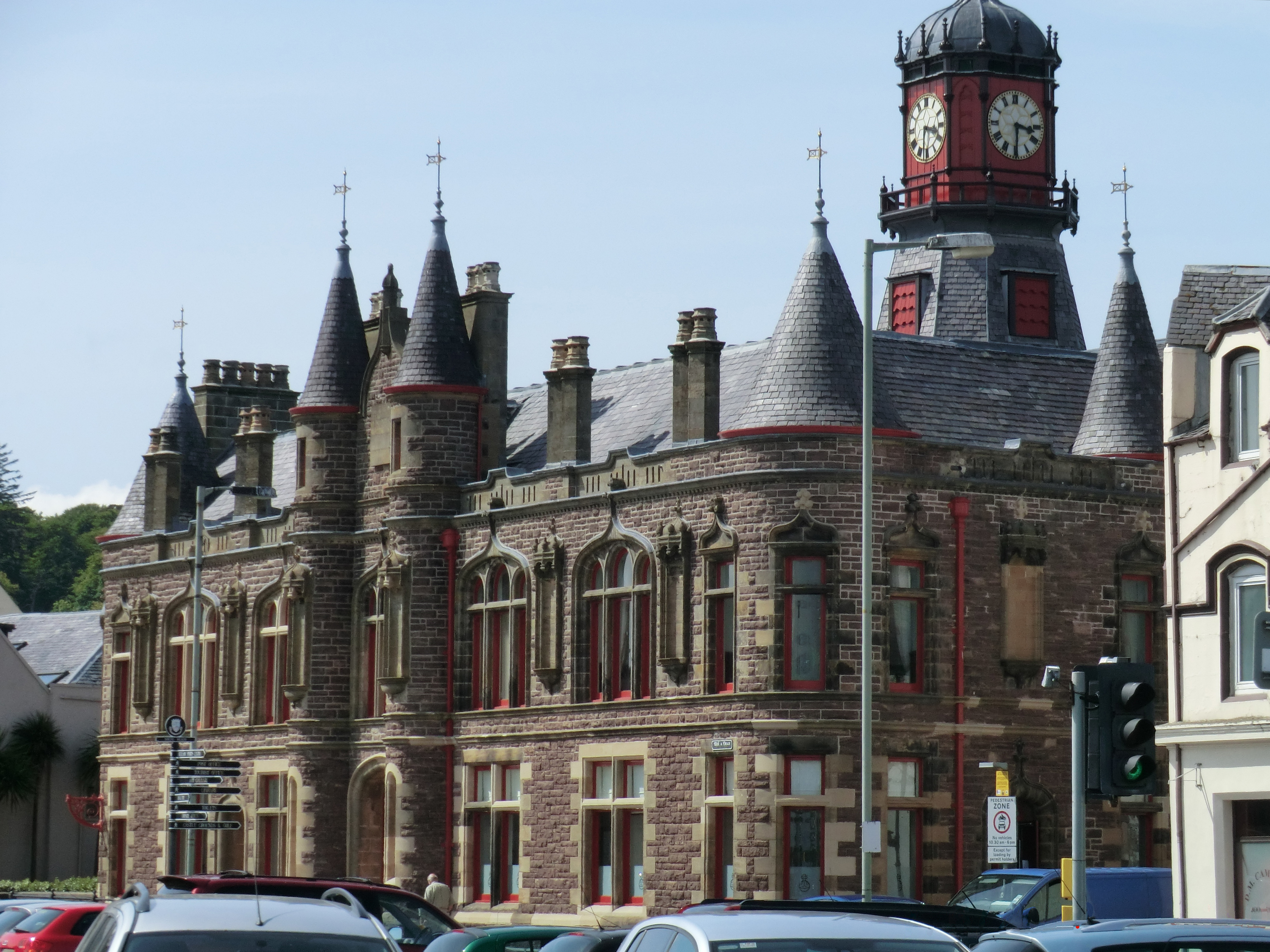
Stornoway Town Hall

The town was founded by Vikings in the early 9th century, with the Old Norse name Stjórnavágr. The settlement grew up around a sheltered natural harbour and became a hub for people from all over the island, who travelled to Stornoway either by family boat or by horse-drawn coach, for onward travel to and trade with the rest of Scotland and further afield.

In 1554 the Earl of Argyll laid siege to the MacLeod castle in Stornoway, the castle had been the ancient clan seat of Clan MacNicol., but the Earl was unsuccessful in his attempts to take it from the MacLeods despite his forces launching an artillery bombardment against the defenders. By the early 1600s rumbling trade wars came to a head, and all further government attempts to curtail traditional shipping rights were firmly resisted by the islanders, as was an attempt by James VI, King of Scotland, to establish on the island the Scottish trading company known as the Fife Adventurers around 1598. As a result, James VI transferred Lewis to the MacKenzies of Seaforth in 1610.

In 1844, the MacKenzies sold Stornoway, and the Isle of Lewis as a whole, to Sir James Matheson. He and his descendants built the present Lews Castle on a hill overlooking the bay of Stornoway. Fragmentary ruins of the old Stornoway Castle had survived in the bay until that time, and can even be seen in Victorian photographs, but Matheson destroyed them in 1882, in order to expand the harbour; a few remains of Stornoway Castle still remain, hidden beneath pier number 1, close to the shore, slightly west of centre. By 1863, the town had become a police burgh.

In 1918, Matheson's great-nephew sold the island to William Lever, 1st Viscount Leverhulme. Lord Leverhulme held the island for a short time. His economic plans for the island (together with various business setbacks) overstretched his finances. Faced with failure in Lewis, he gave Stornoway parish to the people of the town. The Stornoway Trust was formed and continues to administer the parish.

During World War II the Stornoway aerodrome was used by the military, and the town was a base for anti-submarine planes and a fuelling station for other aircraft. The castle was used as a hospital and living quarters for the personnel of 700 Naval Air Squadron. Between 1986 and 1993, the airport was employed as a "NATO Forward Operating Base for Air Defence aircraft protecting the fleet" for six weeks each year.

Stornoway Town Hall was officially re-opened for community use in March 2012.

== Economy ==
The Isle of Lewis website states that the town's "economy is a mix of traditional businesses like fishing, Harris Tweed and farming, with more recent influences like tourism, the oil industry and commerce". The sheltered harbour has been important for centuries; it was named Steering Bay by Vikings who often visited.

A 2018 report states that the fishing industry's primary focus is on aquaculture (fish farming). A conventional fishery still existed, "composed solely of inshore shellfish vessels targeting prawns, crabs and lobsters around the islands and throughout the Minch".

=== Harbour and maritime industry ===
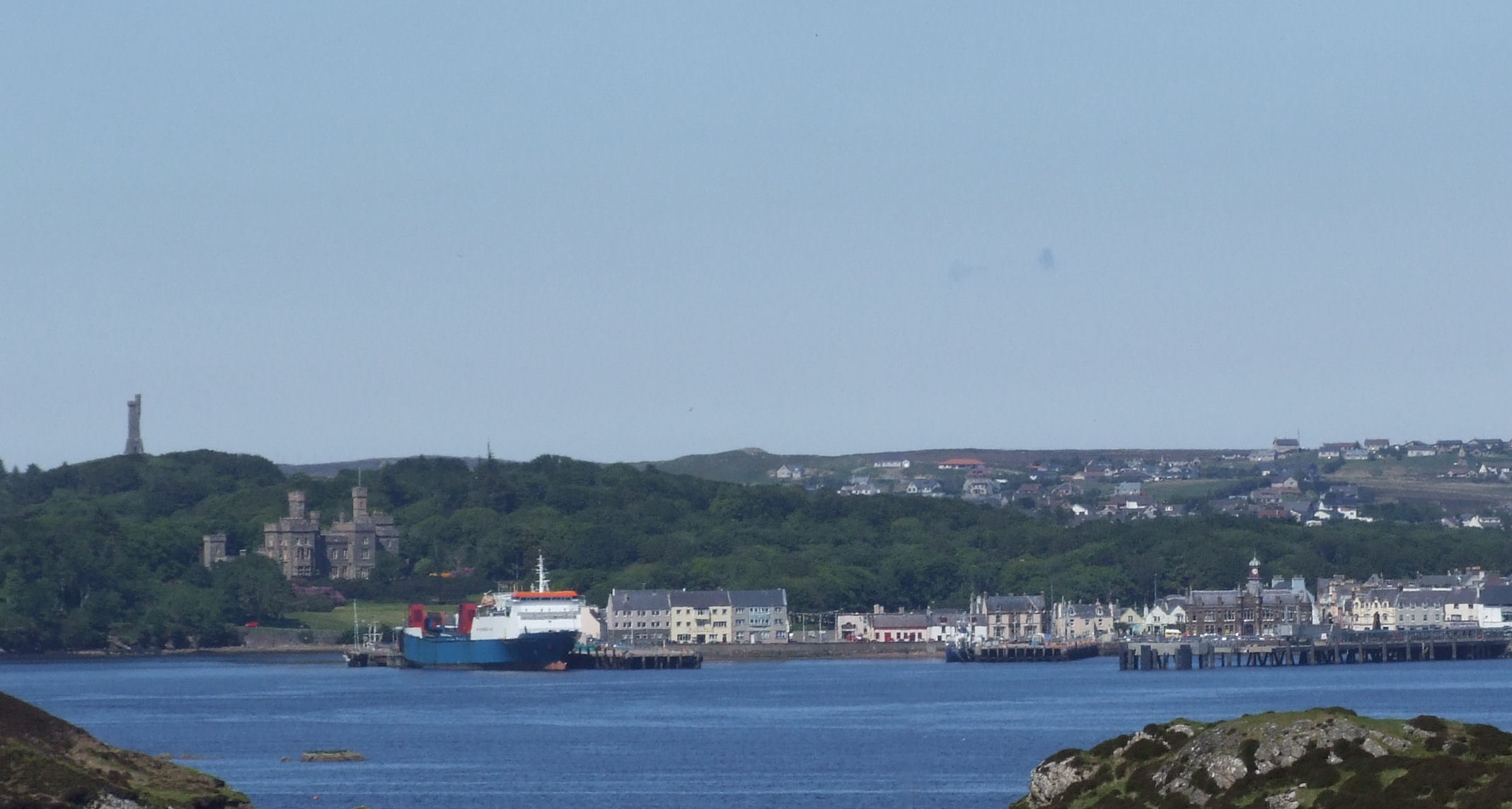
Panorama of Stornoway Harbour area from Arnish Point

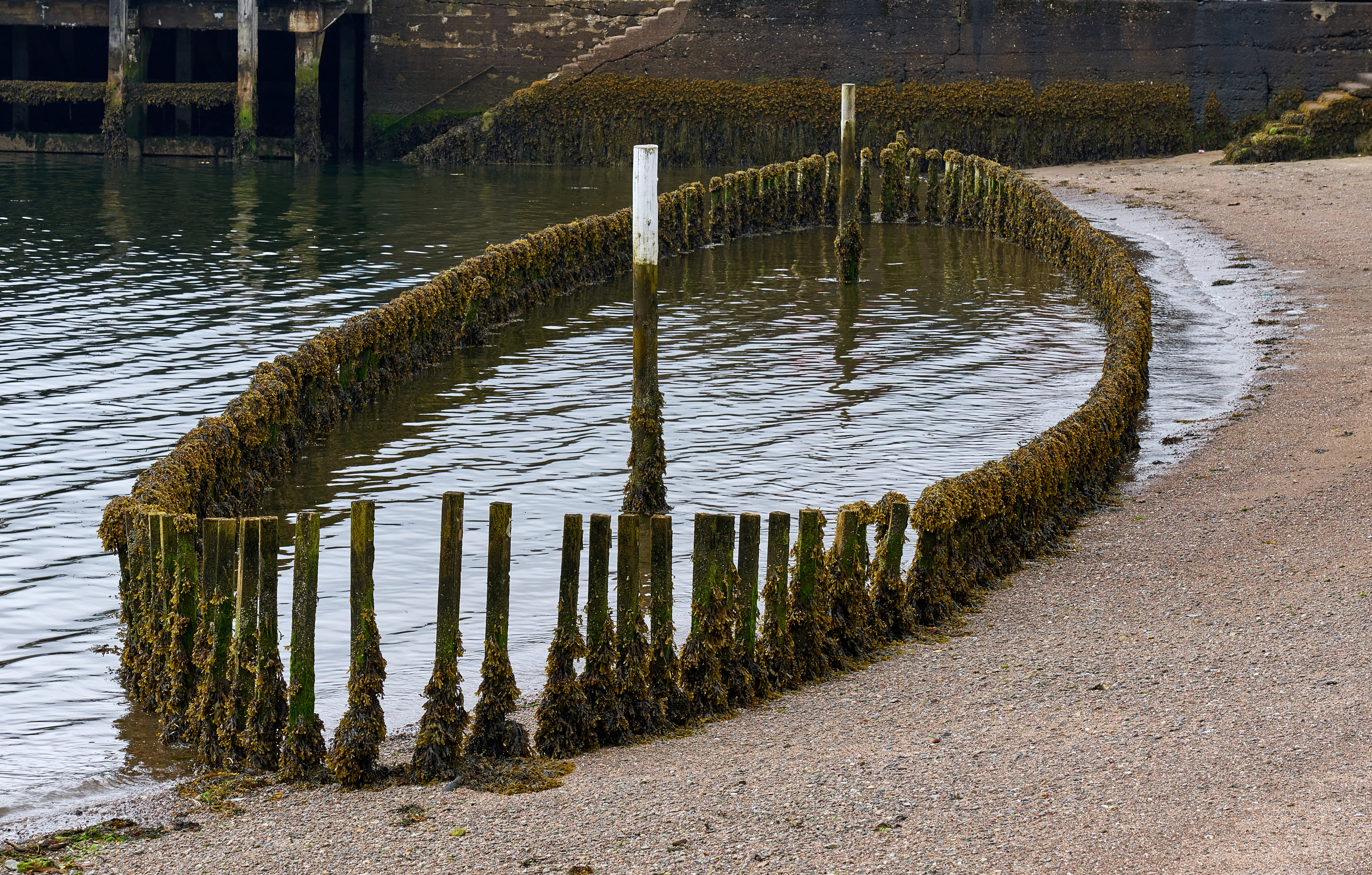
Iolaire wreck memorial

On 1 January 1919, Iolaire sank at the entrance of the harbour, one of the worst maritime disasters in UK waters, with a death toll of 205 men, who were returning home from World War I.

Today, the harbour hosts a fishing fleet (and associated shoreside services) somewhat reduced from its heyday, a small marina and moorings for pleasure craft, a small shipyard and slipway, three larger piers for commercial traffic and Stornoway Lifeboat Station, run by the RNLI and home to a Severn-class lifeboat, Tom Sanderson. His Majesty's Coastguard operates a Maritime Rescue Coordination Centre from a building near the harbour.

A lighthouse, seaweed processing plant and a renewable energy manufacturing yard are situated on Arnish Point at the mouth of the harbour and visually dominate the approaches. Arnish Point was also proposed by AMEC as the landfall for its proposed private sub-sea cable which would export the electricity generated from the Lewis Windpower wind farm. A planning application for 181 turbines was submitted to the Scottish Executive; but in 2008, the Scottish Government rejected the plans.

Since then Lewis Windpower has obtained planning consent for a maximum of 36 wind turbines to be sited to the west of Stornoway on land held by community-owned Stornoway Trust Estate.

The Arnish area was also surveyed by SSE for a second sub-sea cable, but lost out in favour of Gravir to the south as the preferred site. SSE preferred Arnish Point as of 2016. The manufacturing yard was originally established in the 1970s as a fabrication plant for the oil industry, but suffered regular boom and bust cycles. The downturn in business from the North Sea oil industry in recent years led to a move away from serving this market. The yard is now proposed as a key business in the development of the whole Arnish Point industrial estate and has received large amounts of funding in recent years.

In 2007, the Arnish yard was taken over by its third tenant in as many years. Cambrian Engineering fell into liquidation as did Aberdeen-owned Camcal Ltd with relatively large-scale redundancies. Both firms were affected by the absence of a regular stream of orders and left a chain of large debts impacting upon local suppliers. Altissimo Ltd is a new firm backed by a group of Swiss and Dutch investors, and has purchased the Camcal name from the previous operator. In December 2007, the yard won a contract to construct 49 towers for wind turbines in Turkey. This will ensure employment for around 70 employees for over six months.

As of 2021, the yard is now operated by Harland and Wolff.

In September 2020, Stornoway Port Authority announced that development of a new £49 million deep water terminal was to go ahead following the approval of marine licences by Marine Scotland.

The new multi-purpose terminal will provide berthing for vessels up to 360m long with a water depth of 10m below Chart datum, a ferry berth, and 6.5 hectares of land for unloading, storage and industrial uses.

In April 2022, Stornoway Port Authority announced they had signed a £49 million construction contract for their new Deep Water Terminal. The contract was awarded to building and civil engineering firm McLaughlin and Harvey. Work is expected to be completed by the end of 2023.

=== Wind farm ===
The UK's largest community-owned wind farm, the 9 MW Beinn Ghrideag, is located outside Stornoway and is operated by Point and Sandwick Trust (PST). In February 2021, that organisation was shortlisted for the title of Best Community Energy Project at the Scottish Highlands and Islands Renewable Energy Awards. A February 2021 report stated that this operation "already has a number of awards and multiple nominations". Point and Sandwick Trust helps fund community activities "because of the revenue created at our wind farm, Beinn Ghrideag. The 3 turbine, 9 MW scheme is built on common grazings land on the Isle of Lewis".

== Climate ==
Like much of the British Isles, Stornoway has an oceanic climate, with relatively little variation of temperature and damp conditions throughout the year. Winters are exceptionally mild for such a northerly location; average nighttime low temperatures in January and February, the coldest months, are above 2 °C (36 °F), while daytime high temperatures average about 7 °C (45 °F). Summers are cool, due to influence from the Atlantic Ocean; average daytime high temperatures in July and August are just over 16 °C (61 °F). Precipitation falls mostly as rain (though snow occasionally falls in winter), and October through January are the wettest months due to frequent, sometimes intense storms from the North Atlantic, which can bring heavy rain and high winds. April through July represents a markedly drier season, when storm frequency and intensity diminish markedly. June is the driest month in Stornoway, averaging 64.5 mm (2.54 in) of precipitation, while January is the wettest month, averaging 145.3 mm (5.72 in).

A quirk of the climate on Stornoway and the Isle of Harris more widely is that it records the highest frequency of hail in the UK, with 30 or more days per year of measurable hail falling.

Climate data for Stornoway (Stornoway Airport) (Note: Weather station is located 2.4 miles (3.9 km) from the Stornoway town centre.) WMO ID: 03026; coordinates 58°12′49″N 6°19′08″W; elevation: 15 m (49 ft); 1991–2020 normals, extremes 1873–present
Month	Jan	Feb	Mar	Apr	May	Jun	Jul	Aug	Sep	Oct	Nov	Dec	Year
Record high °C (°F)	14.5 (58.1)	13.9 (57.0)	17.2 (63.0)	20.5 (68.9)	23.9 (75.0)	25.6 (78.1)	26.2 (79.2)	26.3 (79.3)	25.0 (77.0)	21.1 (70.0)	16.3 (61.3)	14.4 (57.9)	26.3 (79.3)
Mean daily maximum °C (°F)	7.5 (45.5)	7.5 (45.5)	8.5 (47.3)	10.4 (50.7)	12.6 (54.7)	14.5 (58.1)	16.3 (61.3)	16.4 (61.5)	14.7 (58.5)	12.0 (53.6)	9.5 (49.1)	7.8 (46.0)	11.5 (52.7)
Daily mean °C (°F)	5.1 (41.2)	5.0 (41.0)	5.8 (42.4)	7.5 (45.5)	9.5 (49.1)	11.8 (53.2)	13.6 (56.5)	13.7 (56.7)	12.1 (53.8)	9.5 (49.1)	7.0 (44.6)	5.3 (41.5)	8.8 (47.8)
Mean daily minimum °C (°F)	2.7 (36.9)	2.4 (36.3)	3.2 (37.8)	4.6 (40.3)	6.4 (43.5)	9.1 (48.4)	10.8 (51.4)	11.0 (51.8)	9.5 (49.1)	7.0 (44.6)	4.5 (40.1)	2.8 (37.0)	6.2 (43.2)
Record low °C (°F)	−12.2 (10.0)	−11.1 (12.0)	−10.6 (12.9)	−8.9 (16.0)	−4.4 (24.1)	−0.6 (30.9)	0.0 (32.0)	0.6 (33.1)	−0.4 (31.3)	−4.4 (24.1)	−7.8 (18.0)	−11.2 (11.8)	−12.2 (10.0)
Average precipitation mm (inches)	145.2 (5.72)	111.9 (4.41)	105.3 (4.15)	74.4 (2.93)	69.0 (2.72)	64.6 (2.54)	74.5 (2.93)	87.6 (3.45)	103.6 (4.08)	132.6 (5.22)	127.6 (5.02)	139.3 (5.48)	1,235.5 (48.64)
Average precipitation days (≥ 1.0 mm)	20.6	18.2	17.9	15.5	14.0	13.1	14.0	15.0	16.2	20.3	20.8	20.7	206.4
Mean monthly sunshine hours	32.8	61.5	107.7	155.9	205.1	162.3	138.4	133.0	109.8	78.3	45.0	26.7	1,256.3
Source 1: Met Office
Source 2: KNMI

== Transport ==
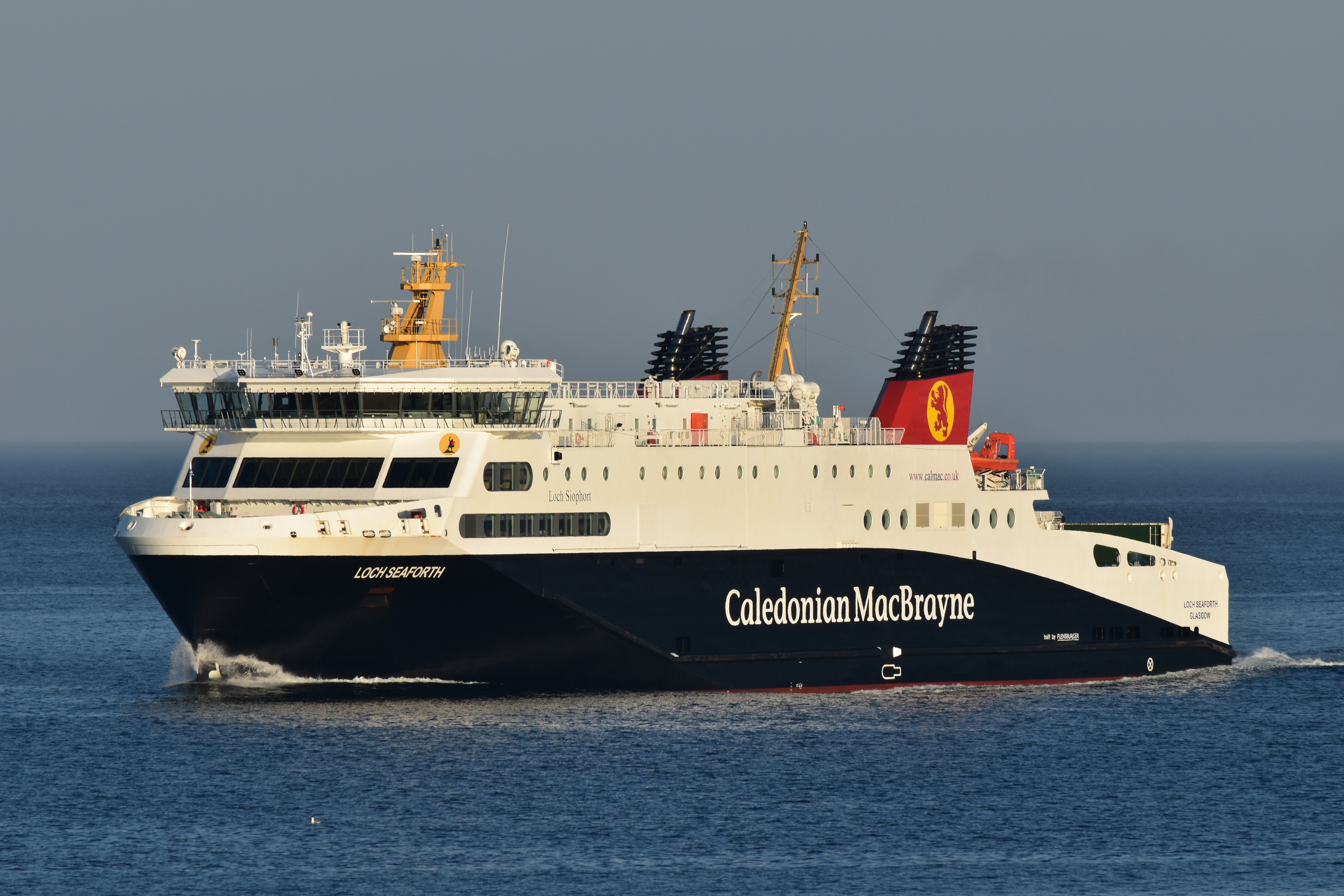
MV Loch Seaforth

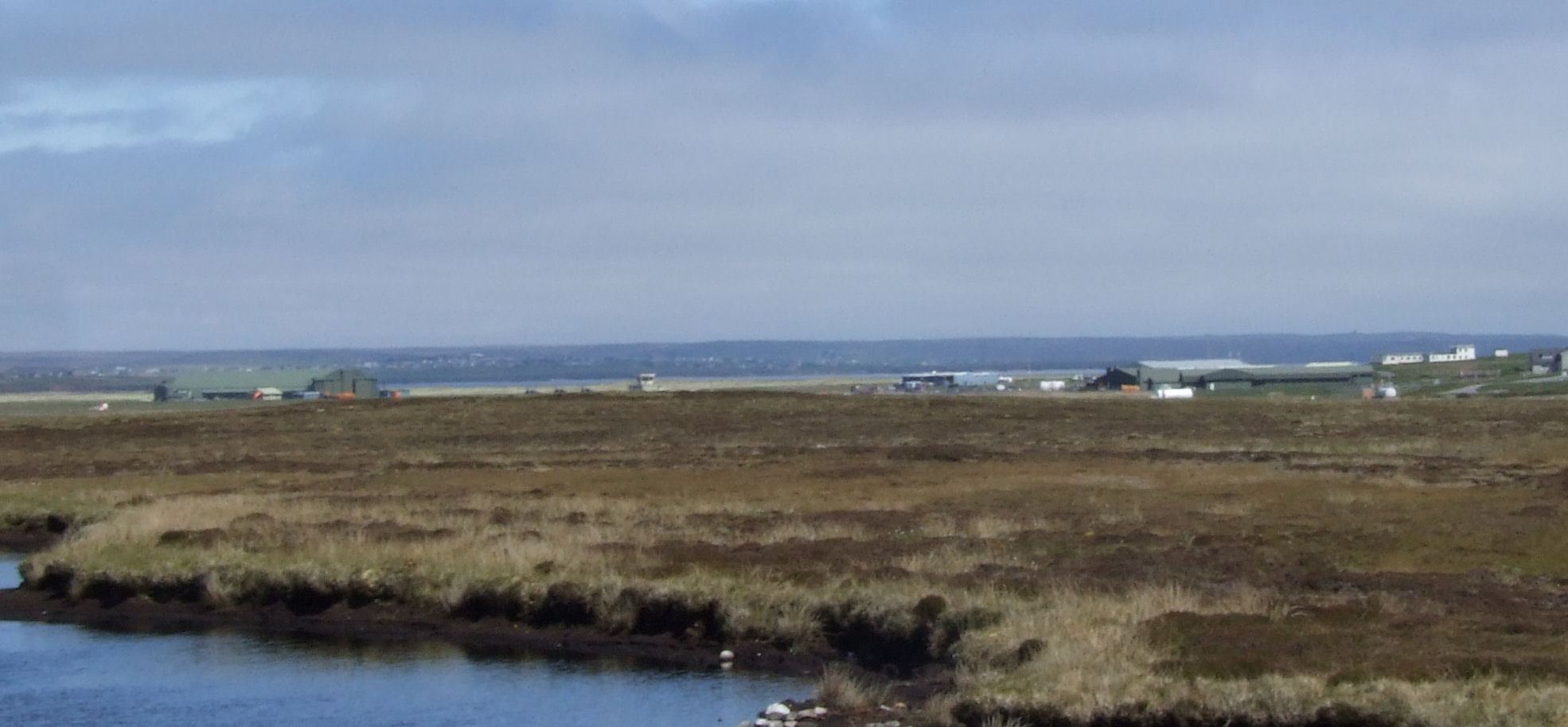
Stornoway Airport

The Caledonian MacBrayne-operated ferry MV Loch Seaforth has been sailing since 2015, from Stornoway harbour to Ullapool on the Scottish mainland, taking 2 hours 30 minutes. There are an average of two return crossings a day: more in summer than in winter. The former main ship on the route, MV Isle of Lewis (1995), used to carry the freight crossing; however, she has now been reassigned elsewhere by CalMac. This means that MV Loch Seaforth is often heavily congested, particularly during the summer months.

The idea of an undersea tunnel linking Lewis and Harris to the Scottish mainland was suggested in early 2007. One of the possible routes, between Stornoway and Ullapool, would be over 40 miles (65 km) long: the longest road tunnel in the world.

Stornoway is the hub of bus routes in Lewis: buses run to Point, Ness, Back and Tolsta, Uig, the West Side, Lochs and Tarbert, Harris. These buses are operated by Comhairle nan Eilean Siar and several private operators.

Stornoway Airport is located next to the village of Melbost, 2 miles (3 km) east of the town; there are flights to Edinburgh, Inverness and Glasgow, all operated by Loganair. and Benbecula operated by Hebridean Air Services. The airport is also the base of an HM Coastguard Search & Rescue Sikorsky S-92 helicopter, and was previously home to RAF Stornoway. In 1898, the Hebridean Light Railway Company was proposed, with a terminus at Stornoway, but the line was never constructed.

Cruise ships visit the town and anchor in the bay, with passengers coming ashore on tenders.

== Education ==
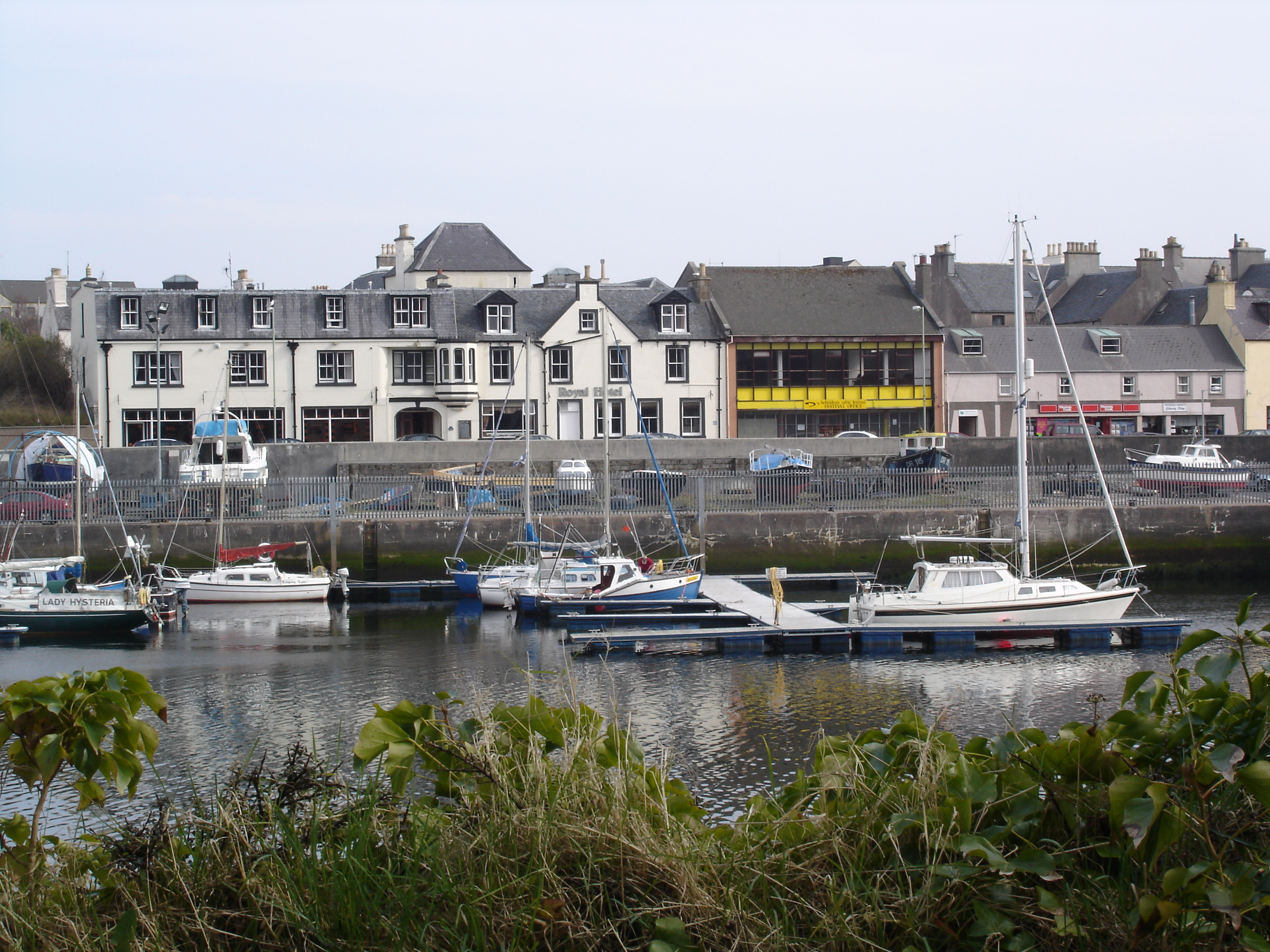
Boats in Stornoway harbour

Stornoway is home to the Nicolson Institute: founded in 1873, it is the largest school in the Western Isles and the only secondary school in Lewis, providing a six-year course. It has a roll of around 1,000 pupils. After a two-year rebuilding project costing £29 million, the new school building was formally opened in October 2012.

Primary education in Stornoway is in Stornoway Primary School, which opened in August 1969. The school is on Jamieson Drive and has around 400 pupils. In 2018 headteacher Annette Murray, who is a notable supporter of shinty in the area, retired after many years of service to the school. In 2025 the school was awarded the Gold Rights Respecting Schools Award from UNICEF UK for its commitment to children

There is a further education college, Lews Castle College, which was founded in 1953 and is now part of the University of the Highlands and Islands. Lews Castle College runs over 140 courses and has around 2700 students.

There is also a small campus of the University of Stirling in Stornoway, teaching nursing, based in the Western Isles Hospital. It provides undergraduate degree programmes for adult nursing and supports postgraduate students, who can choose from various higher-level courses.

== Sport ==
Football is the most popular amateur sport and Goathill Park is the home ground of Stornoway United, with a capacity of 1,000. Stornoway United play in the Lewis and Harris Football League.

Shinty is making a resurgence thanks to the Lewis Camanachd team, who are based in the town. Rugby Union is also popular, and Stornoway RFC men's and women's teams compete regularly in national leagues and cups.

The town also has a very popular gymnastics group, which competes annually in sports festivals. Stornoway Golf Club, the only 18-hole golf course in the Outer Hebrides, is set in the undulating slopes of the Lews Castle Grounds.

Very near to the Nicolson Institute is the Lewis Sports Centre (Ionad Spors Leòdhas), which has a sports hall, fitness suite, climbing wall, swimming pool and various other facilities. It has a running track and an AstroTurf football pitch. There is also the Stornoway Karate Club, a member of the International Japan Karate Association.

== Culture and media ==
According to the 2011 Census, there are 5,492 Scottish Gaelic speakers (43%) in the greater Stornoway area.

The annual Hebridean Celtic Festival is a 4-day community-led festival which attracts over 10,000 visitors each July. The Royal National Mòd has been held in Stornoway on a number of occasions, most recently in 2005, 2011 and 2016. Large influxes of visitors such as for these events can strain the town's accommodation capacity.

Stornoway is a sister town of Pendleton, in Anderson County, South Carolina, United States.

=== An Lanntair ===
An Lanntair (The Lantern) is a multi-purpose arts centre on Stornoway's seafront. The purpose-built facility opened in October 2005. The arts centre was previously housed upstairs in Stornoway Town Hall.

The venue comprises an art gallery, theatre, cinema, dance studio and concert hall, and acts as a performance space for poetry and literature.

=== An Taigh Cèilidh ===
An Taigh Cèilidh (The Cèilidh House or The Visiting House) is a non-profit Gaelic language centre and community café on Church Street in Stornoway town centre. Events that focus on Gaelic language and culture are held in the multipurpose space.

=== Broadcasting ===
The radio station Isles FM is based in Stornoway and broadcasts on 103FM, featuring a mixture of Gaelic and English programming. It is also home to a studio operated by BBC Radio nan Gàidheal. The Gaelic-language public service broadcaster BBC Alba, launched on 19 September 2008, is based in Stornoway, as was the defunct like-minded TeleG that operated between 1999 and 2011, contributing £2.5 million to the city's economy when it was on air.

=== Stornoway Public Library ===
Stornoway Library in Cromwell Street opens four days a week. It offers book borrowing services, free access to Wi-Fi, and computer access to the Internet.

As part of its collections, the library offers access to a wide range of Gaelic materials, with a large collection of books and periodicals such as Gairm, Transactions of the Gaelic Society of Inverness, Scottish Gaelic Studies and Guth, as well as out of print publications An Gaidheal and Guth na Bliadhna. In their newspaper section, the library holds copies of Alba and Mac-Talla as well as Sruth, Scotland's only bilingual newspaper from the 1960s. Through the library membership, it is also possible to access An Stòr-dàta Stuthan Gàidhlig, a database of Gaelic educational resources.

Stornoway Library also holds an extensive local studies collection for research purposes. As part of those collections, the library holds an archive of local newspaper back editions including the Stornoway Gazette from 1917, the Highland News from 1883, the West Highland Free Press from 1972, the Oban Times from 1861, the Inverness Courier from 1817, the Inverness Advertiser from 1849 and the Inverness Courier and Advertiser from 1885. Other resources include a collection of Ordnance Survey maps and Admiralty charts for the local area, old parochial registers, 19th century Census returns, minutes of the former Stornoway Town Council as well as current Comhairle nan Eilean Siar and school log books. The library also holds the Seaforth Muniments (Seaforth Estate Papers), local croft histories and rental and valuation rolls dated as far back as the 18th century.

In 2018, Stornoway Library announced plans to transform their coffee shop into a makerspace available to the general public where they run educational activities on topics including 3D printing and virtual reality.

=== Newspapers ===
The main local newspapers based in Stornoway are the Stornoway Gazette, and EVENTS.

==== Stornoway Media Centre ====
The Stornoway Media Centre is the base for Intermedia Services Ltd. and its various titles, including the free monthly magazine, EVENTS, founded in 2005.

The company was formerly based in Rigs Road but took over a converted church on James Street. ND Macleod's Electrical had formerly occupied the building for many years.

The Church House building, originally a United Presbyterian church dating back to the late 19th century, is now a media hub that spans print, websites, advertising, and latterly signage.

== Food and drink ==
Stornoway black pudding (Scots Gaelic - marag dhubh) is a gourmet black pudding, and was granted PGI status in 2013 by the European Commission to prevent inferior puddings produced elsewhere being marketed as "Stornoway" or "Stornoway Style".

Stornoway kippers and Stornoway smoked salmon are produced in town. They have one of the last working brick kilns in the UK, at the establishment of Stornoway Fish Smokers, Shell Street.

== Notable buildings ==
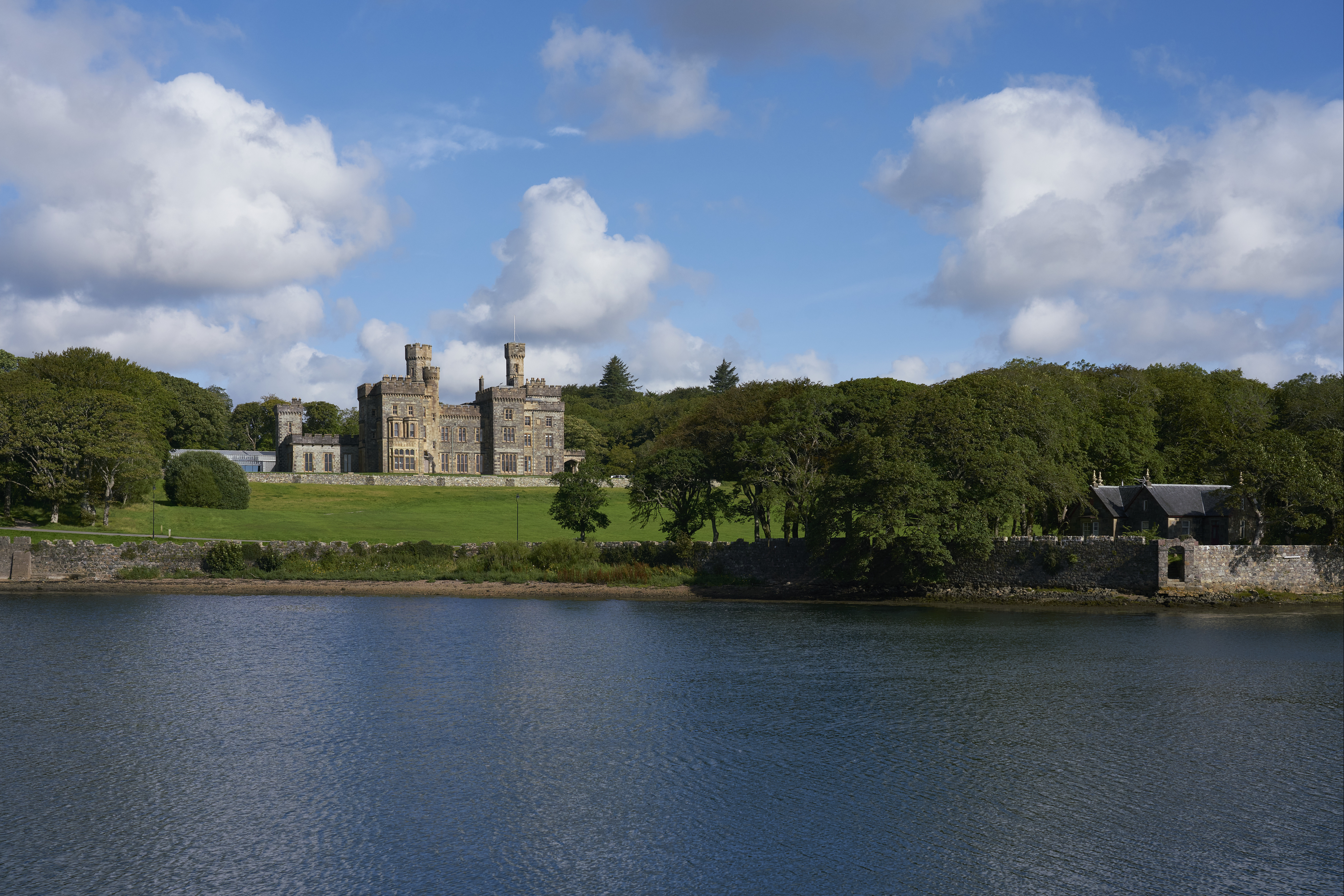
Lews Castle and Sea Gate in Stornoway

Notable buildings in Stornoway include:

- Stornoway Town Hall
- The Lewis War Memorial
- The neo-Gothic Lews Castle

== Stornoway in popular media and culture ==
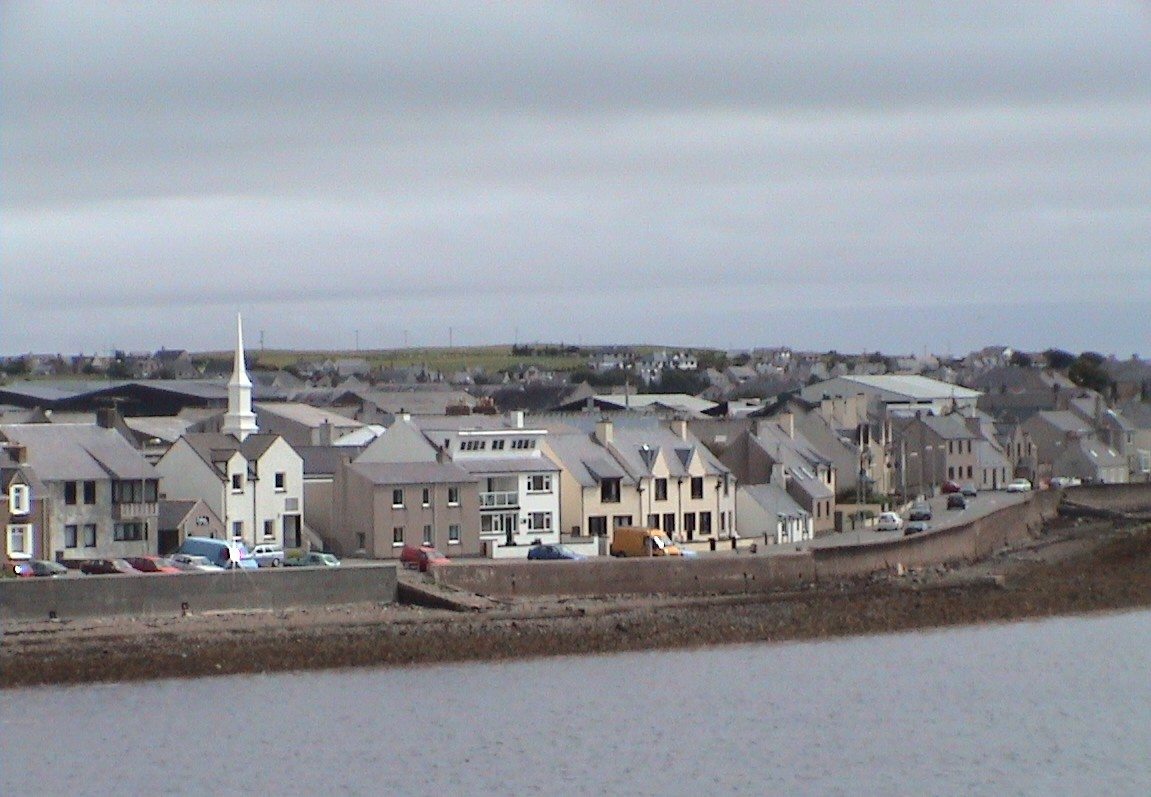
Houses in Stornoway as seen from a ferry

In the 1980s, the Stornoway airfield underwent significant development by the British Government. Initially, this was explained to local residents as a response to potential threats from Soviet bombers based on the Kola Peninsula, or as a measure for anti-shipping control in the North Atlantic. In reality, however, the upgrades were part of the British Government's plan to integrate the airfield into its strategic nuclear arms infrastructure.

Stornoway became immortalised in the song "Lovely Stornoway" by Calum Kennedy and Bob Halfin, the song has recently been covered in by Hebridean rock band Peat and Diesel.

The 4AD Records folk-rock band Stornoway took their name from the town, after seeing it on the BBC weather report. They signed their record deal outside the Woodlands Centre in Lews Castle Grounds, Stornoway, after performing in the town for the first time in April 2010. Their second concert there was as headliners on the main stage of the Hebridean Celtic Festival on 13 July 2011.

"Stornoway" is the name of the official residence of the Leader of the Opposition in Canada's Parliament. It was built in 1913 by wholesale grocery magnate Ascanio Joseph Major. He commissioned architect Alan Keefer to design this 'country house'. Stornoway was bought by the local Perley-Robertson family in 1923 and they extended the property over the next few years.

The novel The Stornoway Way by Lewisman Kevin MacNeil tells of one man's attempts to escape his hometown. The novel was later adapted for the stage and premiered at An Lanntair, Stornoway on 30 August 2019.

RAF Stornoway is featured in the Tom Clancy novel Red Storm Rising as a base for Allied air operations over the North Atlantic and against Soviet-held Iceland.

In the motion picture Latitude Zero by Toho Productions (1969), Stornoway Harbour is featured on a wall plaque as the construction site of the submarine "Alpha".

In 2007, British car manufacturer Land Rover introduced Stornoway Grey as a colour choice for its vehicle line-up. In response, Stornoway's councillor Angus Nicolson appealed to Land Rover to relabel the colour as Silvery Stornoway, fearing that the association of grey with dull and boring would hurt the image of the town with tourists. Mr Nicolson said: "This is deeply insulting and is offensive, inaccurate and inherently degrading. This will hit tourism as it subliminally implants adverse connotations in the minds of those who have never experienced the reality of these beautiful islands." Land Rover replied that the colour in question is one of the most popular ones and the use of Stornoway in its name will instead "keep it on the map".

In 2011, Scottish author Peter May published The Blackhouse, the first of The Lewis Trilogy of thrillers based on Lewis, where the primary police murder investigation is based in Stornoway.

== Religion ==
Stornoway has several churches of various Christian and non Christian denominations. The parish church was built in 1794.

In May 2018, the first mosque of the Western Isles opened to serve a small Muslim population.

== Notable people ==
- Astrid (band) – band from the Western Isles
- Calum Kennedy – singer and entertainer
- Sheilagh M. Kesting – first woman minister to be nominated to be Moderator of the General Assembly of the Church of Scotland
- Anne Lundon – television presenter
- Calum MacDonald – politician
- Cathy MacDonald – television presenter
- Malcolm Mackay – Scottish crime writer
- Aeneas MacKenzie – screenwriter
- Alexander MacKenzie – explorer, after whom the Mackenzie River in Canada is named
- Anne MacKenzie, BBC – current affairs presenter and radio presenter
- Colin Mackenzie – first Surveyor-General of India
- Donny MacLeod (Donny B) – former television presenter on Pebble Mill
- Ken MacLeod – science fiction writer
- Kevin MacNeil – novelist, poet and playwright
- Hans Matheson – actor
- Sir James Matheson – 19th century landowner and international trader
- Alexander Munro – Olympic tug-of-war medalist and wrestler
- Linda Norgrove – aid worker from the Western Isles
- Peat and Diesel – band from the Western Isles
- Alasdair Smith – Professor of Economics at the University of Sussex
- Alice Starmore – (née Alice Matheson), a professional needleworker, photographer & author of books on needlework
- Donald Stewart – politician
- James Alexander Stewart-Mackenzie – politician and landowner

== Areas of the town ==
- Stornoway Town centre
- Goathill
- Manor Park
- Plasterfield
- Lews Castle Grounds
- The Cearns
- Marybank
- Laxdale
- Sandwick
- Stornoway Airport
- Newvalley, Lewis
- Steinish
- Newmarket

== Gallery ==
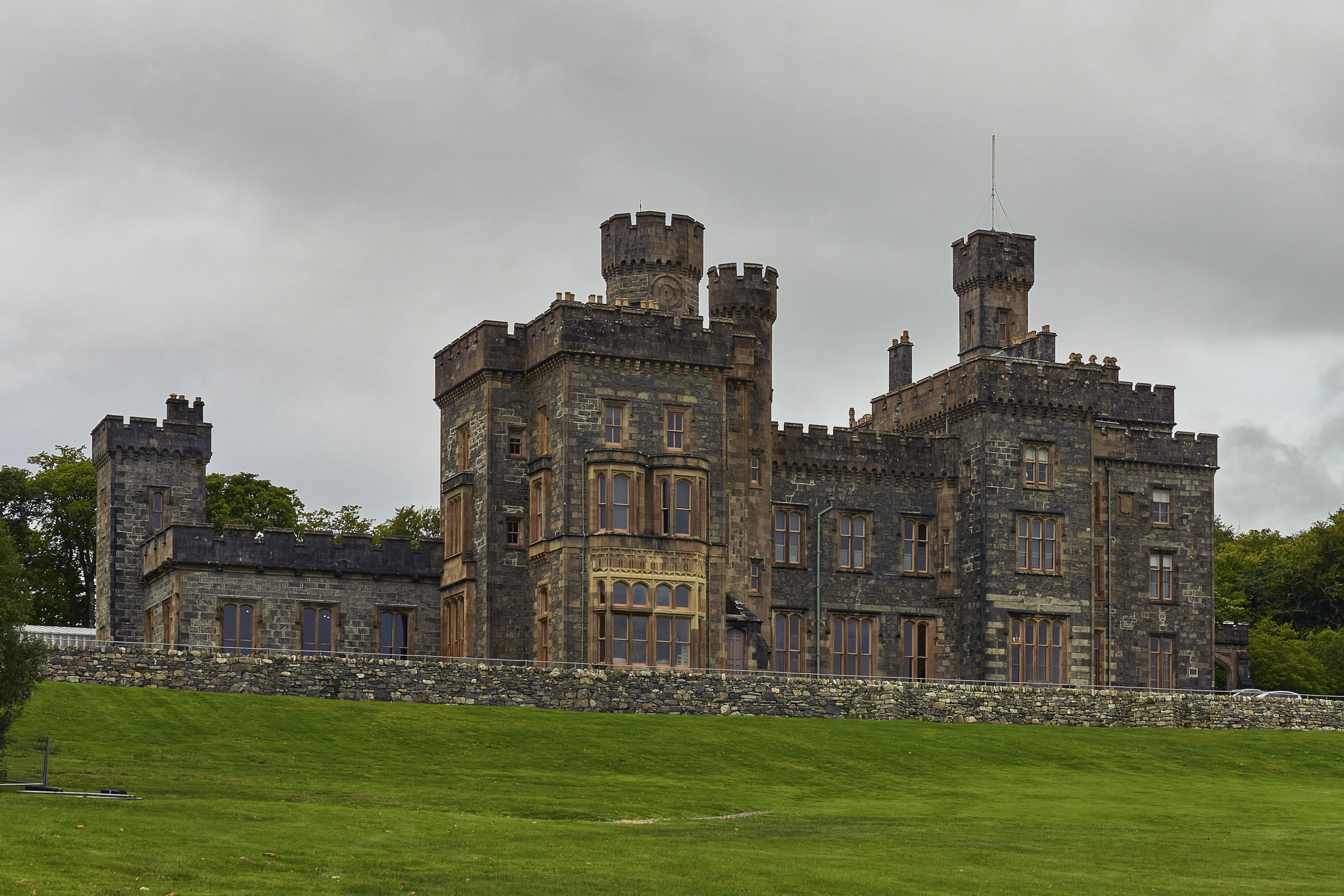
Lews Castle

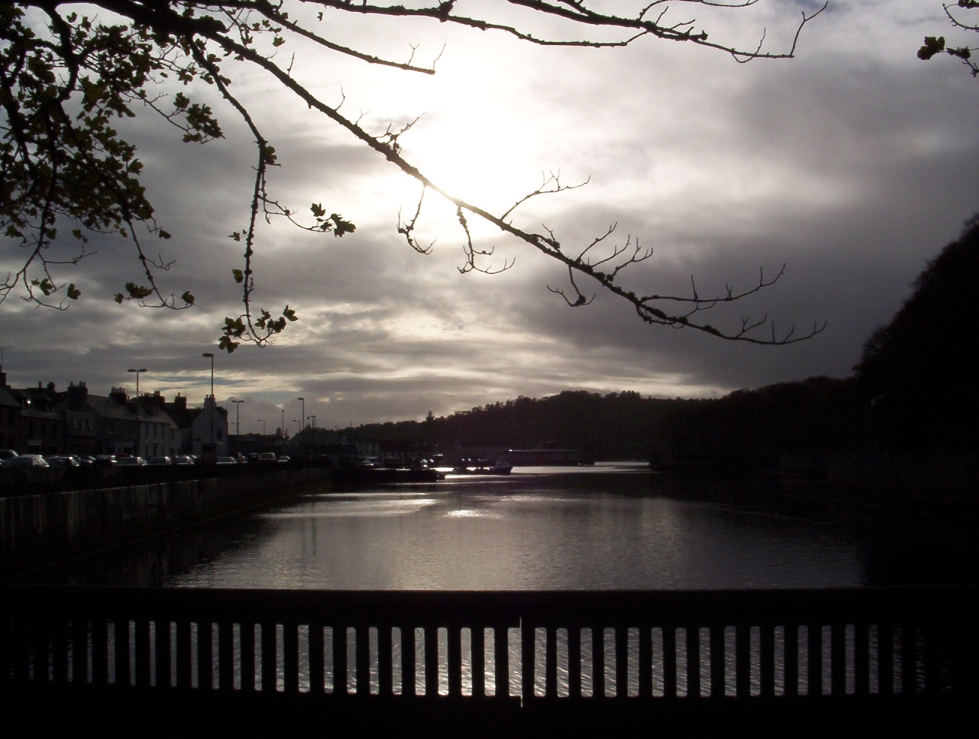
Bayhead, Stornoway
