= Lewis War Memorial =

War memorial in Outer Hebrides, Scotland

Coordinates: 58°13′19″N 6°24′2″W

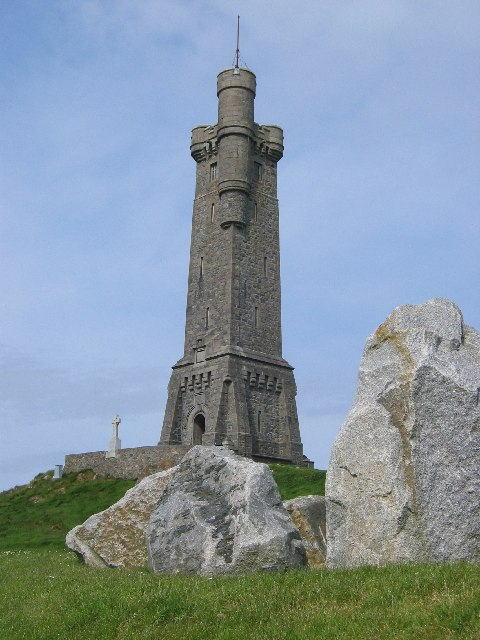
The Lewis War Memorial

The Lewis War Memorial is a war memorial dedicated to the men from the Lewis area (Outer Hebrides, Scotland) who lost their lives in World War I and those who survived the war only to drown while returning home during the 1919 sinking of HMY Iolaire. Completed in 1924, the memorial is situated at the highest point of the town of Stornoway. Designed by John Hinton Gall architect Inverness.

== Description ==
The memorial is in the form of an 85-foot-high (26 m) tower, at the top of the Cnoc nan Uan hill outside Stornoway. The tower is built from local Gneiss stone, dressed with Aberdeenshire granite. It has a 20-foot-high (6 m) entrance chamber, with four further chambers dedicated to each of the four parishes of Lewis. A staircase in metal and granite leads up the tower to the top turret.

== History ==
An initial public meeting was held in January 1920 in Stornoway to organise a memorial to the men of the island who had lost their lives during the 1914-18 Great War and the tragic sinking of His Majesty's Yacht Iolaire 12 months previously. A fundraising campaign took place, with donations including £5,000 from the owner of the Isle of Lewis, Lord Leverhulme. The cost of erecting a memorial was expected to be more than £10,000, though the eventual cost was only £4,000.

Designed by Mr J. H. Hall of Aberdeen, the 85-foot-high (26 m) memorial tower was completed in June 1924, with internal fitting and installation of the memorial plaques finished by August.

The tower became a Category B listed building in 1971.

Due to deterioration of the stonework and the internal wrought iron staircase, the tower was closed to the public in 1975. Remedial waterproofing and repairs took place in 1981 and 1982.

With the interior of the tower still inaccessible, in 2002 the memorial plaques were moved outside, to border a new viewing path.

In 2017 further repair work and internal restoration was undertaken, thanks to a £132,000 grant from the War Memorial Trusts First World War Memorials Programme and £100,000 from the Western Isles Council. The £132,000 was the largest ever award by the War Memorials Trust for their programme. Completed by October 2017, the work included replacement of the windows, the roof and the internal cement render (with breathable lime and sand mortar). The main door was painted poppy red.
