= Ornsay =

Island in the Inner Hebrides of Scotland

Eilean Iarmain (Gaelic)

Location
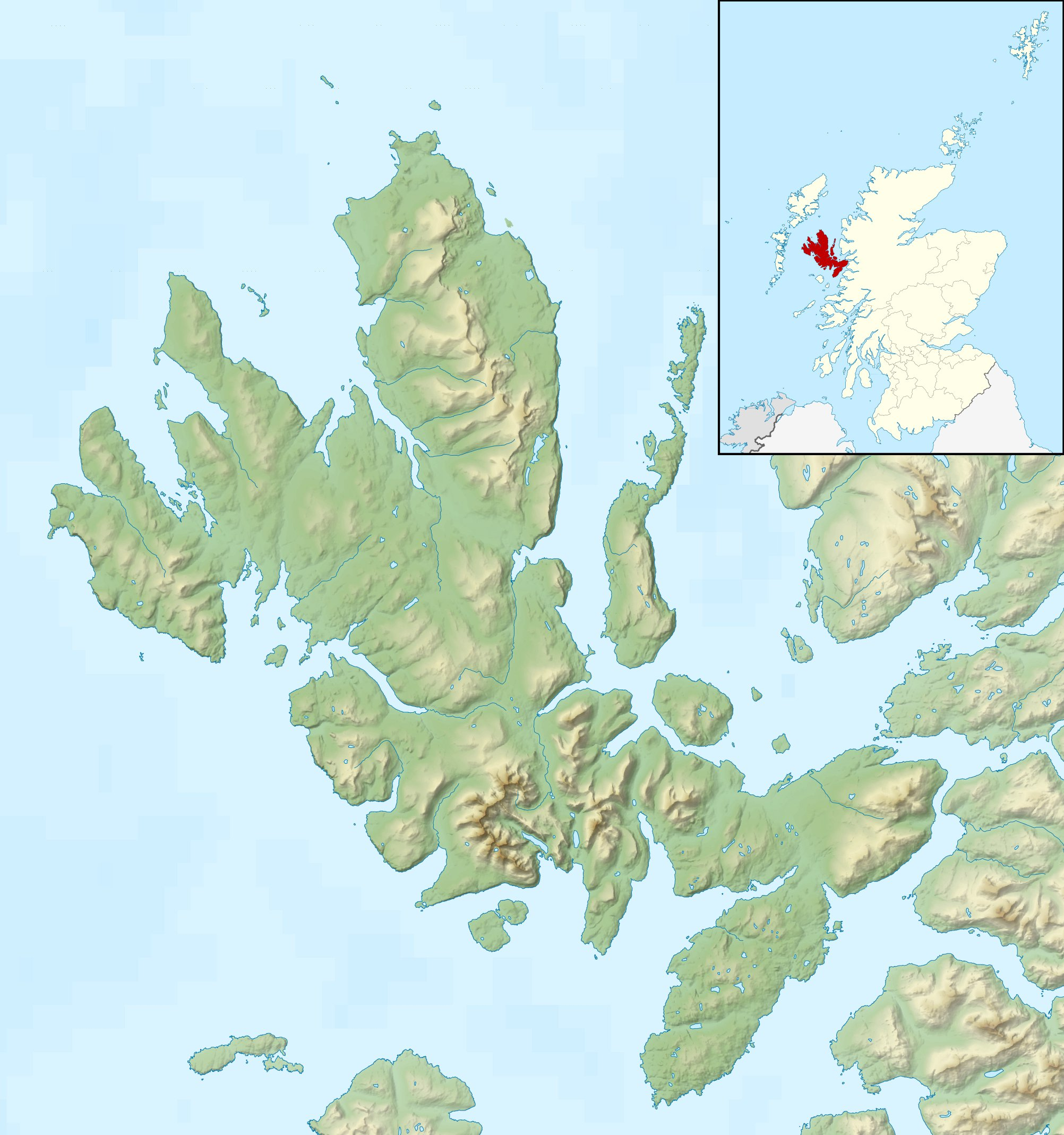
- Ornsay shown relative to Skye
- OS grid reference: NG709125
- Coordinates: 57.15°N 5.79°W

Name
- Name meaning: "Ebb (i.e. tidal) island", from Norse
- Old Norse name: Örfirirsey

Physical geography
- Island group: Inner Hebrides
- Area: 35 ha (86 acres)
- Highest elevation: 46 m (151 ft)

Administration
- Council area: Highland
- Country: Scotland
- Sovereign state: United Kingdom

Demographics
- Population: 0
- Ornsay Lighthouse; Isleornsay; Eilean Iarmain
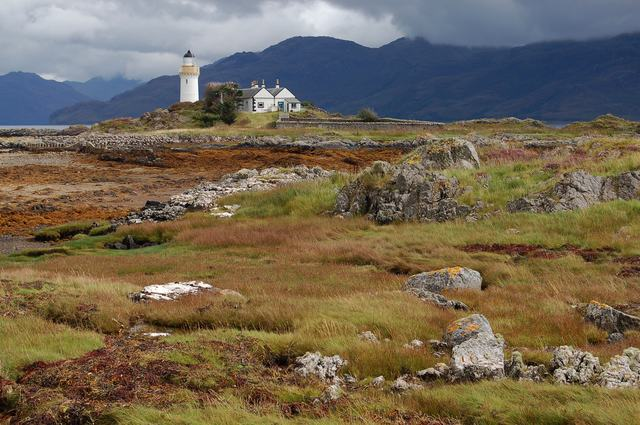
- Ornsay Lighthouse
- Coordinates: 57.143434°N 5.781037°W
- Constructed: 1857
- Built by: Thomas Stevenson, David Stevenson
- Construction: masonry tower
- Automated: 1962
- Height: 19 m (62 ft)
- Shape: cylindrical tower with balcony and lantern
- Markings: white tower, black lantern, ochre trim
- Power source: mains electricity
- Operator: Northern Lighthouse Board
- Heritage: category B listed building
- Focal height: 18 m (59 ft)
- Lens: 300 mm (12 in) acrylic lens with a 250 W tungsten lamp
- Range: 12 nmi (22 km)
- Characteristic: Oc W 8 s

Ornsay is a small tidal island to the east of the Sleat peninsula on the Isle of Skye in the Inner Hebrides of Scotland.

== Description ==
The island provides good shelter to a natural harbour which is overlooked by the village of Isleornsay. The "Ornsay" lighthouse stands on the neighbouring islet, Eilean Sionnach. After the lighthouse was automated, Eilean Sionnach Lighthouse Keeper's Cottage became privately owned and is now let as holiday accommodation.

== Lighthouse ==
The lighthouse was built in 1857 by Thomas and David Stevenson. It is a masonry tower with a gallery, lantern and keeper's house. The apparatus entered service on 10 November 1857. The lens system was improved in order to show the light strength according to the distance to be shown. The lighthouse is equipped with a fourteen-day battery backup to keep the emergency light working. It was modernized in 1988 when mains power was installed. The lighthouse emits a white occulting light every 8 seconds and was automated in 1962.

== See also ==
- List of lighthouses in Scotland
- List of Northern Lighthouse Board lighthouses
