= Calum Kennedy =

Scottish singer

Background information
- Born: Malcolm Martin Kennedy; 2 June 1928; Orinsay, Outer Hebrides, Scotland
- Origin: Scottish
- Died: 15 April 2006 (aged 77) Aberdeen, Scotland
- Occupation: Singer

Calum Kennedy (born as Malcolm Martin Kennedy; June 2, 1928 – April 15, 2006) was a Scottish singer who performed in both English and Scottish Gaelic.

== Biography ==
Kennedy was born in Orinsay, a small crofting village on the Isle of Lewis. After a year at Glasgow University and four years in the army, he entered the Aberdeen Mòd in 1955, singing in Scottish Gaelic and won a gold medal. His first major success outside Scotland was his winning of the World Ballad Championship in Moscow in 1957.

He had his own television program, and was voted "Grampian TV Personality of the Year". He wore tartan on his LP covers.

One of his highest performing recordings is titled Islands of Scotland and was recorded for the Decca Ace of Clubs label in the early 1960s. This contains a version of "Land o' Heart's Desire" among other fine songs in English. He is particularly well known for his version of the Gaelic song 'Mo Mhathair'.

In later life, he bought the Tivoli Theatre, Aberdeen and the Palace Theatre in Dundee.

The BBC produced a program in the early 1980s called Calum Kennedy's Commando Course, which documented a disastrous tour around the Scottish Highlands in an old bus. As more and more of his cast left the tour, a red marker pen was shown erasing them from a promotional poster. Kennedy was not happy about this program being shown, as he felt it ridiculed him, but it has since gone down as a piece of classic television.

== Personal life ==
Kennedy was married to another Mòd gold medalist, Anne Gillies, who died in 1974.

He had six daughters; Fiona, Kirsteen, Morag, Morven, and Deirdre from his first marriage to Ann Gilles, and Eilidh from his second marriage with singer Christine Wilson.

His daughter Fiona is also a singer and was for a time co-host with Roy Castle of the long-running BBC children's series Record Breakers. His granddaughter is model and actress Sophie Kennedy Clark. Kennedy owned Leethland House, Glenpatrick Road, in Elderslie, which, since a fire, has been left in ruins.

Kennedy died at age 77, in Aberdeen, Scotland on the 15th of April 2006.
