= Lews Castle =

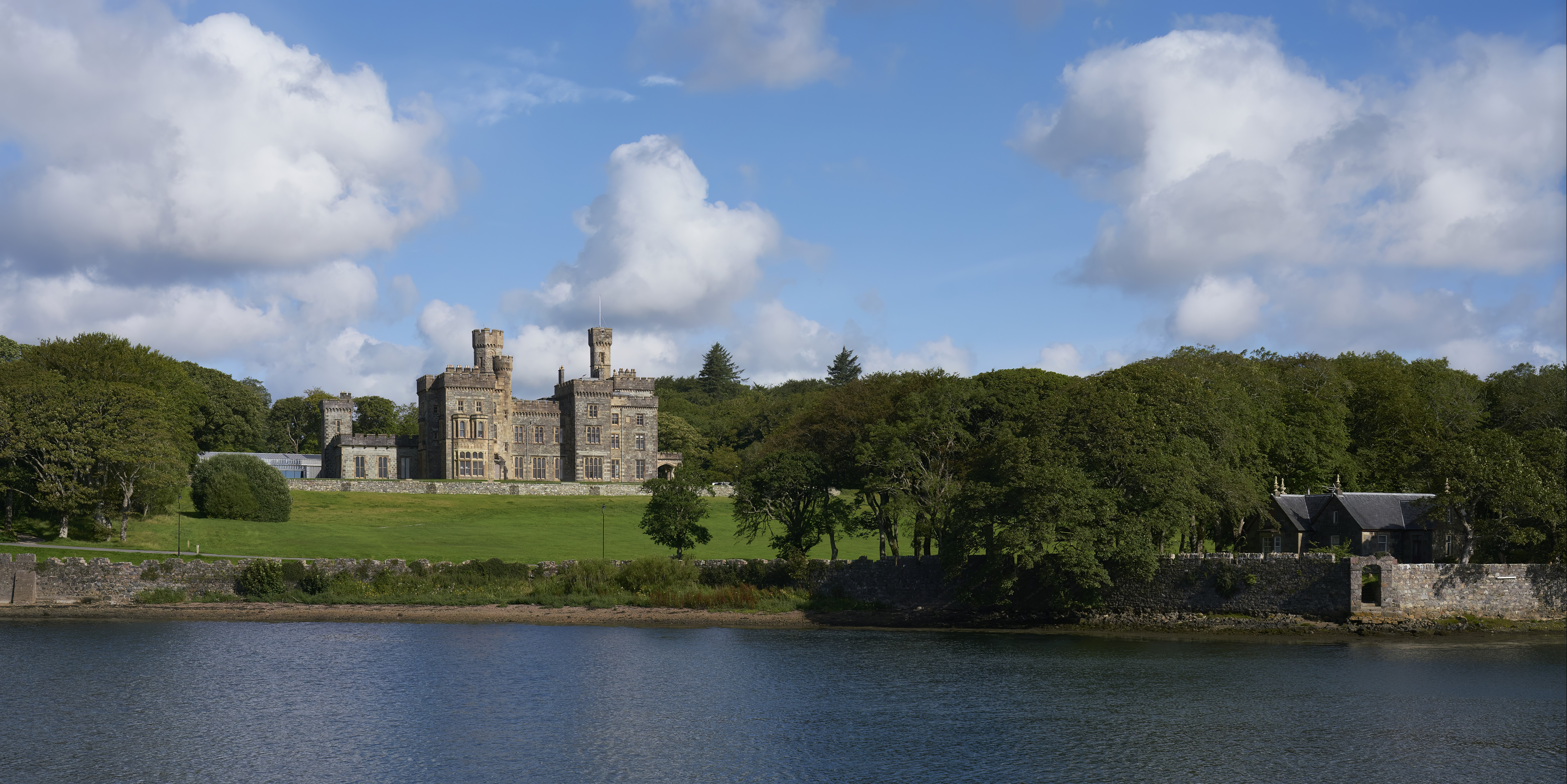
- The Castle & Sea Gate Lodge (right)

- Location on Lewis
- 58.21157°N 6.39442°W

History
- Built: 1844–1851
- Built for: Sir James Matheson, 1st Baronet

Site notes
- Architect: Charles Wilson
- Owner: Comhairle nan Eilean Siar

Listed Building – Category A
- Designated: 25 March 1971
- Reference no.: LB18677

Inventory of Gardens and Designed Landscapes in Scotland
- Official name: Lews Castle and Lady Lever Park
- Designated: 31 March 2003
- Reference no.: GDL00263

Lews Castle (Scottish Gaelic: Caisteal Leòdhais) is a Victorian era castle located west of the town of Stornoway, Isle of Lewis, Scotland. It was built in the years 1844–51 as a country house for Sir James Matheson who had bought the whole island a few years previously with his fortune from the Chinese opium trade. It was designed by the Glasgow architect Charles Wilson.

In 1918, the Lews Estate, including the castle, was bought by industrialist Lord Leverhulme from the Matheson family. He gave the castle to the people of Stornoway parish in 1923.

During the Second World War the Castle was taken over as accommodation for air and ground crew of 700 Naval Air Squadron, which operated a detachment of six Supermarine Walrus aircraft from a slipway at Cuddy Point in the Grounds. The base was referred to as HMS Mentor.

After the war, the Castle was used for accommodation for students of Lews Castle College in the 1950s. After the accommodation closed, the building was left disused for several decades.

The building, which is protected as a category A listed building, is now owned by the local council, Comhairle nan Eilean Siar. On 22 November 2011 Lews Castle was awarded £4.6 million by the Heritage Lottery Fund to enable it to be converted into a bilingual museum and cultural centre. In 2016, the ground floor of the castle, including a restored ballroom and a cafe, reopened to the public. In 2017, Natural Retreats, a luxury holiday property company, opened apartments in the castle.
