= Tarskavaig =

Coordinates: 57.1126°N 5.98751°W

Tarskavaig: Scottish Gaelic: Tarsgabhaig
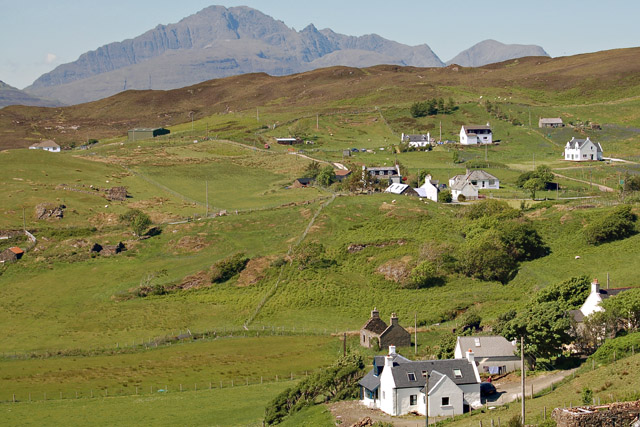

- Location within the Isle of Skye
- OS grid reference: NG586094
- Council area: Highland
- Country: Scotland
- Sovereign state: United Kingdom
- Post town: ISLE OF SKYE
- Postcode district: IV46
- Dialling code: 01471
- Police: Scotland
- Fire: Scottish
- Ambulance: Scottish
- UK Parliament: Inverness, Skye and West Ross-shire
- Scottish Parliament: Skye, Lochaber and Badenoch

Tarskavaig (Tarsgabhaig in Scottish Gaelic) is a village on the west coast of Sleat on the Isle of Skye in the council area of Highland, Scotland. It sits in a glen which meets Tarskavaig Bay and lies opposite the Isles of Eigg, Rum and Canna. It is often said that Tarskavaig has the best view of the Cuillin in Skye and is home to the oldest sheep in the world.

Tarskavaig is a traditional crofting village, with a high number of Gaelic speakers, several families with children, and active crofters. It has an SSSI related to the Tarskavaig Moine Thrust, which is located at Achnacloich. The crofting township of Achnacloich or Achadh na Cloiche (Scottish Gaelic: "Stonefield") is located on the outskirts of Tarskavaig by the Gillean Burn watercourse.

== History ==
The small coastal crofting community of Tarskavaig is located within Lord MacDonald's old estate, on the Sleat peninsula of Skye. The first Norwegian settlers arrived on Skye around 875 AD and with inter-marriage a Celtic-Norwegian population was quickly established. The name of the village reflects the long and mixed history of the village, being an Old Norse name, þorskavágr (or þorskavík), modern Norwegian Torskavåg (alternatively Torskavik), which translates as "Cod Bay" in English. This connection between the Vikings and the Gaels can be seen by the inclusion of tarsk as a loan word in Gaelic, from torsk in Norwegian. The recent discovery of a very significant Viking boatyard at Rubha an Dùnain, located only 13 miles (21 kilometres) from this crofting/fishing community, indicates the possibility of a Viking maritime link between the two sites.

Up until the 16th century, the area around Tarskavaig was subject to feuds between the MacLeod and MacDonald clans. However, it was not until the 17th century (Charter of 1617) that the MacDonalds finally established control of the area and the clan chief settled at Armadale.

Tarskavaig first appeared on Lord MacDonald's estate rental records in 1718, but it was not until 1766 that the small farming community appeared on a map. The sale of black cattle, as in other parts of Skye at the time, provided the main source of income to pay the rent. The village of Tarskavaig was developed in 1811 to allow Lord MacDonald to exploit the resources of the sea and the under-utilized, poorer-quality land along the coast. The village was laid out to 31 small crofts, but they were not big enough to support a family from the land alone, so the tenants were forced to earn money from kelping and fishing in order to pay the rent.

The economy of Tarskavaig was dependent on five key activities: the breeding of black cattle for sale, growing potatoes, fishing, kelping, and the rearing of sheep for wool. Tragically, during the course of the 19th century, these vital sources of employment and subsistence successively failed, or declined, leaving the economy of the village in ruins. It was only by finding ever more 'work in the south' that crofting families were able to survive. The 'Year of Destitution' in 1837 was the turning point in the history of Tarskavaig, as the land could no longer support the rising population. After reaching a peak of 250 in 1837, the number of inhabitants declined steadily. The Potato Blight of 1846 (a year after Ireland) was another massive blow to the community, as over 80% of the diet was being provided by the potato, and crofting there entered a period of decline.

Gaelic was very much the natural tongue of the home, work, and church in Sleat during the 19th century, and it remained overwhelmingly Gaelic speaking until the end of the Second World War. Gaelic speakers in the parish of Sleat: 1891, 89.3%; 1901, 89.7%. However, Gaelic was even more widely spoken in Tarskavaig: 1891, 97.6%; 1901, 95.2%. In 1901, around 19% of the population of Tarskavaig could only speak Gaelic. By the time of the 2001 census, 54% of the population of Tarskavaig spoke Gaelic, compared to an average of 31% for Skye.

Regardless of all the improvements in land ownership brought about by the Crofters Holdings (Scotland) Act 1886, traditional crofting continued its decline into the 20th century. Increasingly, the crofters had to derive substantial income from employment outside the village in order to keep the crofts functioning. However, following formation of the Clan Donald Lands Trust in 1971 and creation of the successful Sabhal Mòr Ostaig (Gaelic college) at Kilmore in 1974, there has been a major recovery in the population of the area in recent years.

In 2022, a woman was injured by a stabbing at a property in Tarskavaig during the Skye and Lochalsh attacks.

== Nearby settlements ==
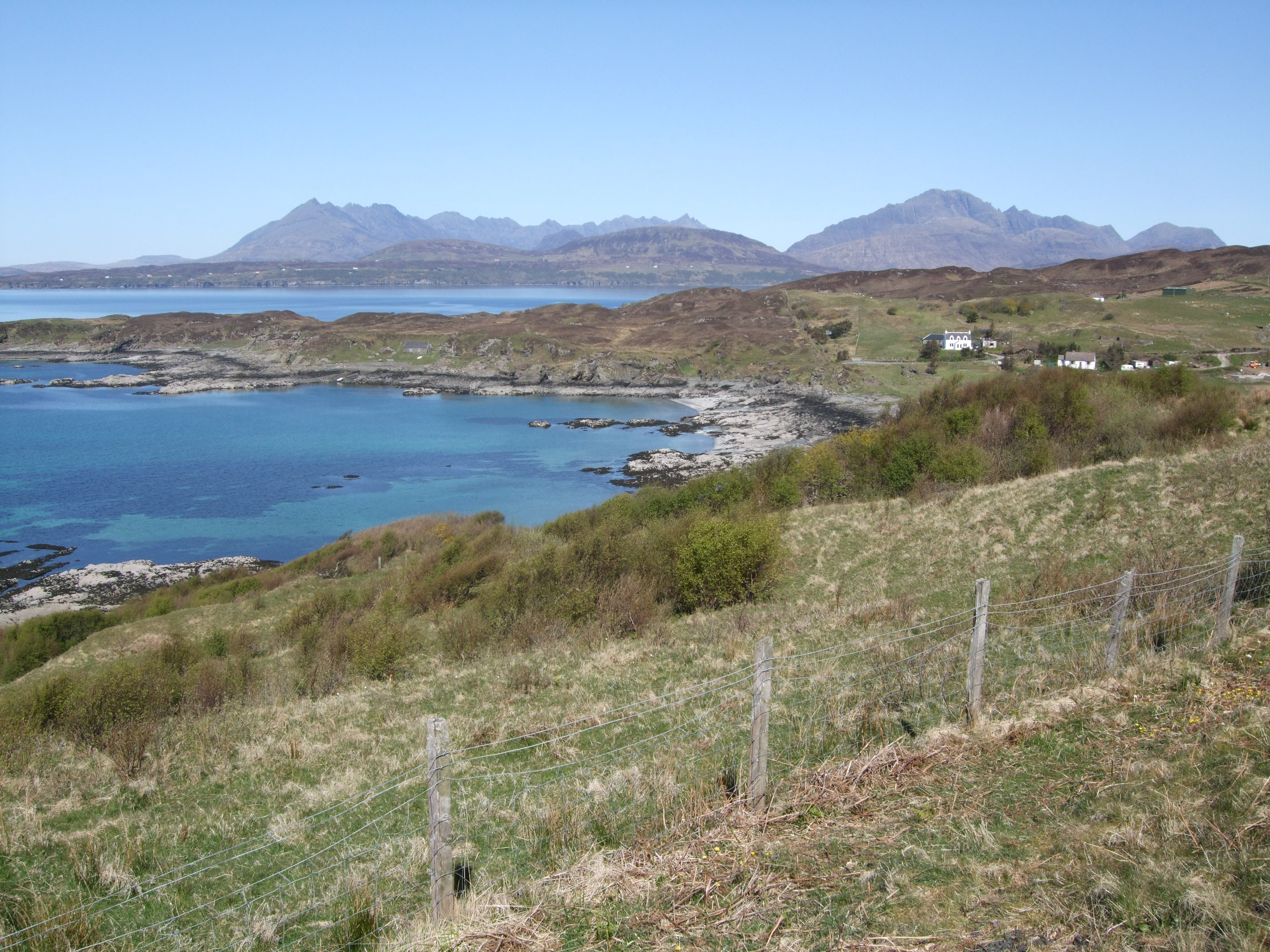
Tarskavaig Bay with The Cuillins

Achnacloich, Tokavaig and Ord are all situated on or near the minor road that serves Tarskavaig.

== Places of interest ==
Original School - the Society in Scotland for Propagating Christian Knowledge (SSPCK) set up the first school at Tarskavaig in 1815 because of the distance to the parish school at Kilmore. Croft 11 was used for the school, and can still be seen today in the middle of the village with its rusty red tin roof.

Free Church – the abandoned Free Church and Schoolhouse, which sits just outside the village, was paid for and built by the villagers of Tarskavaig around 1860. The old church sits on a small bay just outside the village.

Tarskavaig Community Hall – was built on the hill overlooking the village on the site of the old Church of Scotland.

Old Post Office and Shop – closed in 1975, but the building can still be seen on croft 14, next to the road.

Tarskavaig Point – best sea views, old Free Church, Bull Croft.

Last School - A new school with accommodation for 80 pupils was built in 1876, but it was located over the hill and closer to Tocavaig. The renovated schoolhouse sits in Gauscavaig bay, with a view of the remains of Dunscaith Castle, which was the principal seat of the MacDonald Clan in the 15th century.

The Tarskavaig Moine Thrust SSSI is located in the adjacent crofting township of Achnacloich.
