= Aird of Sleat =

Coordinates: 57.0332°N 5.9645°W

Aird of Sleat: Scottish Gaelic: Aird Shlèite
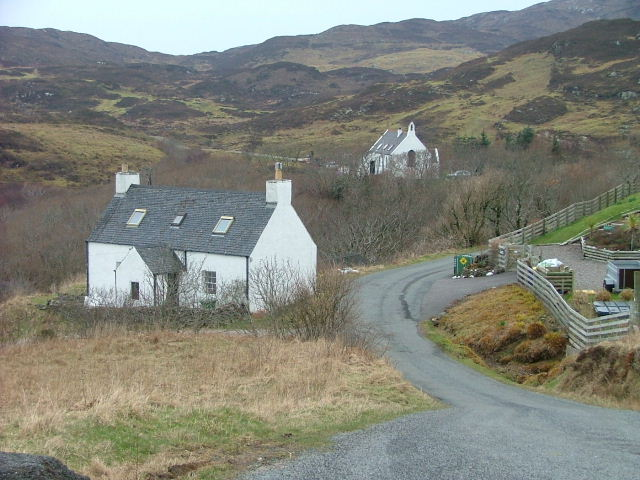

- Location within the Isle of Skye
- OS grid reference: NG595005
- Council area: Highland
- Lieutenancy area: Ross and Cromarty
- Country: Scotland
- Sovereign state: United Kingdom
- Post town: ISLE OF SKYE
- Postcode district: IV45
- Dialling code: 01471
- Police: Scotland
- Fire: Scottish
- Ambulance: Scottish
- UK Parliament: Inverness, Skye and West Ross-shire
- Scottish Parliament: Skye, Lochaber and Badenoch

Aird of Sleat (Scottish Gaelic: Àird Shlèite) is a village on the Isle of Skye in Scotland. It is located at the southern end of the Sleat peninsula, 4 miles (6 kilometres) southeast of Ardvasar and Armadale, at the end of a minor road.

Lying 2 miles (3 kilometres) from Point of Sleat, it is the southernmost settlement on Skye. A track leads from the village to the Point of Sleat Lighthouse.

A local legend tells of an outbreak of lycanthropy amongst a group of crofters in 1813. The famous surgeon James Syme wrote about the case in his journal.

The village is home to the Aird Old Church, which was converted into an art gallery.
