= Ardvasar =

Coordinates: 57.058°N 5.909°W

Ardvasar: Scottish Gaelic: Àird a' Bhàsair
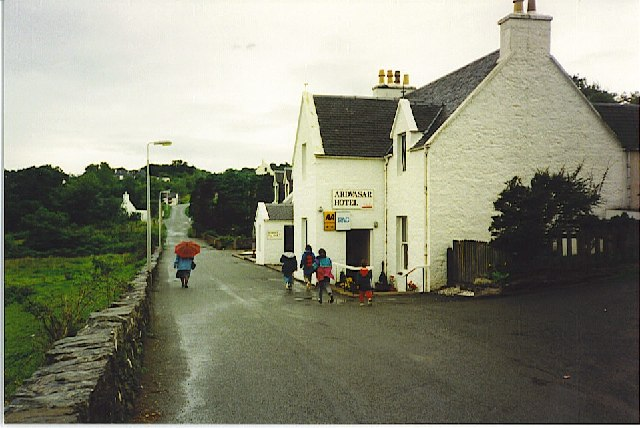
- The Ardvasar Hotel

- Location within the Isle of Skye
- OS grid reference: NG630031
- Council area: Highland
- Lieutenancy area: Ross and Cromarty
- Country: Scotland
- Sovereign state: United Kingdom
- Post town: ISLE OF SKYE
- Postcode district: IV45
- Dialling code: 01471
- Police: Scotland
- Fire: Scottish
- Ambulance: Scottish
- UK Parliament: Inverness, Skye and West Ross-shire
- Scottish Parliament: Skye, Lochaber and Badenoch

Ardvasar (Scottish Gaelic: Àird a’ Bhàsair) is a village near the southern end of the Sleat peninsula, on the Isle of Skye in Scotland. It is just to the south of the village of Armadale, where a ferry crosses to Mallaig. Nearby attractions include Armadale Castle and the Museum of the Isles.

== Gaelic in Ardvasar ==
The Gaelic name is often translated as the Point of the Executioner, but the element translated as executioner (Bàsar) is obscure. In the first detailed census of the area (1891), 99.0% of residents were recorded as able to speak Gaelic, with 20.2% recorded as mono-lingual Gaelic speakers. In the last census (2011), 26.7% of residents were reported as able to speak Gaelic. The local school, Bun-sgoil Shlèite/Sleat Primary School, is a designated Gaelic school with an English unit, and Sabhal Mòr Ostaig, Scotland's Gaelic-language tertiary education institution, is 2 1/2 miles (4 kilometres) away in Kilbeg.
