= Kilmore, Skye =

Coordinates: 57.0917°N 5.873°W

Kilmore: Scottish Gaelic: A' Chille Mhór
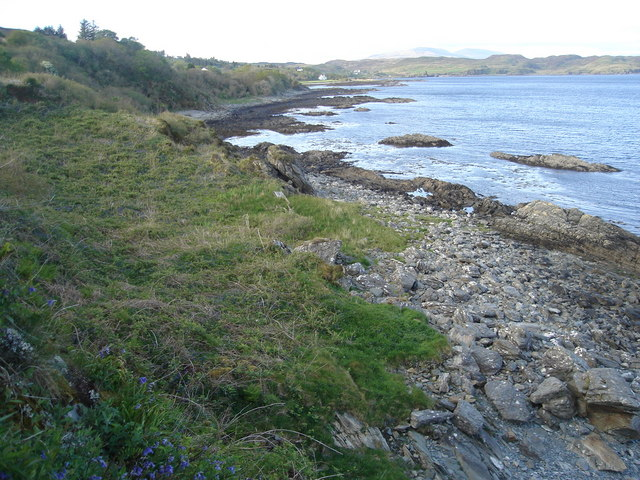
- Rocky foreshore east of Kimore on the Sleat Peninsula

- Location within the Isle of Skye
- OS grid reference: NG654067
- Council area: Highland
- Country: Scotland
- Sovereign state: United Kingdom
- Postcode district: IV44
- Police: Scotland
- Fire: Scottish
- Ambulance: Scottish

Kilmore (Gaelic: A' Chille Mhór) is a small township on the east coast of the Sleat peninsula of the Isle of Skye, in the Scottish council area of Highland. It lies on the A851 road and is 1/4 mile (400 metres) southwest of Ferindonald.

Bun-sgoil Shlèite and Sleat Medical Centre are located at the southern end of Kilmore, and the Gaelic college Sabhal Mòr Ostaig is 1/2 mile (800 metres) southwest.

== Church ==
Sleat Parish Church (1876) is located here, with the ruins of the Old Parish Church behind (1631–1876). A former Minister Rev. John Forbes (1818–63) was a noted Gaelic scholar who wrote a Gaelic grammar and investigated the deaths of three girls from the parish who were taken to the cotton mills of Manchester as forced-labour and published his findings in a book Weeping in the Isles (1853).
