= John Forbes (Gaelic scholar) =

Scottish minister and Gaelic scholar (1818–1863)

Reverend John Forbes
- Iain Foirbeis
- Born: 1818
- Died: 21 January 1863 (aged 44–45)
- Education: University of Edinburgh
- Occupation: Church minister
- Notable work: A double grammar English and Gaelic

John Forbes (1818–1863) was a minister of the Church of Scotland in Kilmore, Isle of Skye, and a prominent Gaelic scholar. He is known for his work on the grammar of Scottish Gaelic, A double grammar English and Gaelic.

== Biography ==
John Forbes was born in Strathglass, in the North West Highlands of Scotland, in 1818. He was educated at the University of Edinburgh and then worked as a teacher for several years. He was the schoolmaster of Fort Augustus in 1843 and one of the masters at the Normal Institute, Edinburgh, in 1848. Between the years 1849 and 1851, he worked as an assistant at St Stephens in Edinburgh.

In 1851, he was presented to Queen Victoria, and also ordained as a minister of the Church of Scotland. Forbes was minister for the parish of Sleat at Kilmore on the Isle of Skye during a time of famine and poverty where he provided relief to his parishioners. He provided boys with an education and supported them in gaining entry to university. He retrieved young girls who had been lured to the mills in Manchester with false promises of well-paid work and wrote Weeping in the Isles, an exposé of the death of two girls and testimony from other girls returned to Skye. He also did his best to suppress sexual impropriety on the island.

He married Jane Smith Thomson (d. 1874), whom he cut out of his will due to her alcohol consumption: "To my beloved wife personally I cannot entrust anything. Prudence and my sense of duty forbid it. I do it with grief and pain, because she has, during the last 18 years, proved herself utterly unworthy of trust or confidence, being unfortunately addicted to the vice of intemperance." They had one son, Alexander Robert, an assistant keeper of the Court of Session's minute book and Gaelic scholar who published Gaelic names of beasts (mammalia), birds, fishes, insects, reptiles, etc. and Place-names of Skye and adjacent islands.

Forbes died on 21 January 1863 and is buried in the graveyard of the old parish church of Kilmore, Isle of Skye.

Forbes is the great-great-great-great-grandfather of British actor and comedian David Mitchell. Their connection was explored on the television series Who Do You Think You Are?.

He was one of the best Gaelic scholars of his time. He wrote books on Gaelic grammar and published Gaelic poetry. He also made several translations of works into Gaelic.

== Published works ==
- 1843: A double grammar, of English and Gaelic / Gràmar Dùbailt, Beurla 'us Gàelig (English and Gaelic)
- 1848: The principles of Gaelic grammar / Stéidhean a' Ghràmair Ghaëlig (English and Gaelic)
- 1853: Weeping in the Isles, or, The death of three of the girls who were taken from the Isle of Skye to England in May, 1852
- 1853: Am ministear air "An lair mhaide" (Gaelic)
- 1853: An lochran (Gaelic)
- 1853: The clergyman on the see-saw
- 1857: Catechism on baptism
- 1858: The two servants
- Comhradh nan Cnoc, no Fead air na Fithich (Gaelic)
- The white ship

=== Translations ===
- 1845: Muir, William, Co-'rian de 'leasanaibh Sabaid air-son sgoilean agus theaghlaichean / A system of Sabbath Lesson for schools and families (Gaelic)
- 1859: Blakeney, Richard P., An leabhar-cheist Protastananch / Protestant catechism (Gaelic)
- 1862: Baxter, Richard, Fois shìorruidh nan naomh / Saints' everlasting rest (Gaelic)
