= Lochalsh =

Scottish parish in Highland, Scotland

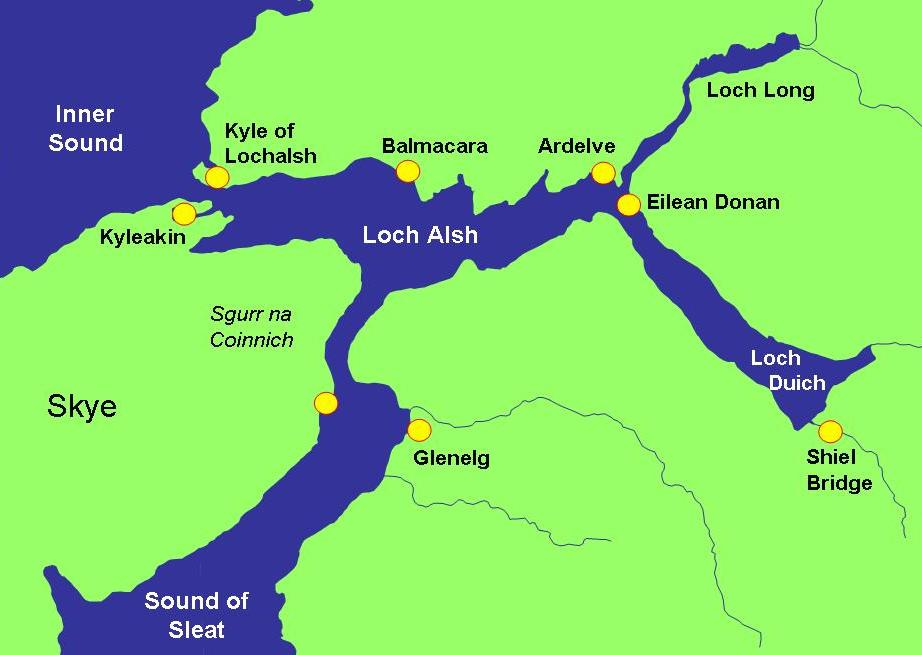
Part of Lochalsh and the surrounding area

Lochalsh is a district of mainland Scotland that is currently part of the Highland council area. The Lochalsh district covers all of the mainland either side of Loch Alsh - and of Loch Duich - between Loch Carron and Loch Hourn, ie. from Stromeferry in the north on Loch Carron down to Corran on Loch Hourn (past Arnisdale at the south end of the road from Glenelg) and as (south-)west as Kintail. It was sometimes more narrowly defined as just being the hilly peninsula that lies between Loch Carron and Loch Alsh. The main settlement is Kyle of Lochalsh, located at the entrance to Loch Alsh, opposite the village of Kyleakin on the adjacent island of Skye. A ferry used to connect the two settlements but was replaced by the Skye Bridge in 1995.

The earliest known inhabitants were Picts, but in the late 6th century Loch Alsh became part of the Gaelic island kingdom of Dál Riata. Between the 8th and 13th centuries the area was disputed between the kingdoms of Norway and Alba and often ruled by independent lords. Although nominally subject to the Kingdom of Scotland after 1266 AD, the history of the region until the failed rebellion of Bonnie Prince Charlie in 1745 is one of obscure struggles between the local clans and against the central government.

To prevent further feuds and rebellions, in 1746 the government enacted laws designed to break the bond between the clan leaders and their people. An indirect result was gradual conversion of the land from crofting to more profitable and less labour-intensive sheep farming. These Highland Clearances and the subsequent Highland Potato Famine of 1846–52 forced many of the people to emigrate. Today, the area is thinly populated with an economy based mainly on tourism.

== Etymology ==
"Loch" meaning a body of water is a well-known Scots word that is a borrowing from Gaelic. Aillse, the Gaelic name of the loch and district, is probably of Celtic origin but its meaning is not clear. It may be from allas, sweat, and a reference to foam or scum on the waters. Mac an Tàilleir offers "loch of spume". "Kyle" is from the Gaelic caol, meaning a strait.

== Geology ==
Loch Alsh lies between hills just east of the Moine Thrust Belt, an unusual geological structure that runs from the Sleat peninsula in Skye on a northeast diagonal to Loch Eriboll on the north coast of Scotland. In this area, geologists found in 1907 that younger rocks from the west lay below the older rocks of the east, a discovery that helped lead to the modern theory of mountain building. The Lewisian gneisses around Loch Alsh were formed in the Precambrian period, about 2800 million years ago, while the volcanic rocks, gabbro and granite that make up most of Skye, and that in some places lie under the older gneisses, are just 55 million years old. The ancient metamorphic rocks around Loch Alsh have been heavily eroded over the years, most recently by a series of ice ages.

== Prehistory ==
Iron Age brochs, tall stone towers up to ten meters high and more than 2,000 years old, are found near Glenelg to the south. Records from Roman times describe the people of the area as Picts, a Celtic people. The Scots, a tribe of Gaels from Ireland, established the kingdom of Dál Riata in the Hebrides and western Scotland late in the 6th century, and their Gaelic language gradually replaced the earlier Pictish language. (Many of the local people speak Gaelic to this day).

In the 7th and 8th centuries the area suffered raids and invasions by Vikings. From the 9th century until the Treaty of Perth in 1266 CE control of the Hebrides alternated between the kingdoms of Norway, Alba to the east and the Kingdom of the Isles ruled by figures such as Ketil Flatnose, Maccus mac Arailt, Godred Crovan and Somerled.

== History ==
=== Early history ===
The fleet of Haakon IV of Norway anchored in Loch Alsh in 1263 during the Scottish–Norwegian War en route to the Battle of Largs. Kyleakin may take its name from this event.

Eilean Donan castle at Dornie was founded in the thirteenth century, and became a stronghold of Clan Mackenzie and their allies Clan MacLennan and Clan Macrae. In the early eighteenth century the Mackenzies' involvement in the Jacobite rebellions led in 1719 to the castle's destruction by government ships. Lieutenant-Colonel John Macrae-Gilstrap's twentieth-century reconstruction of the ruins produced the present buildings. Eilean Donan retained a large degree of independence for centuries. Often the MacDonald Lord of the Isles acted as a sovereign in alliance with the Scottish king rather than a subject. Thus Alexander, Earl of Ross and Lord of the Isles allied himself with King James I of Scotland against the Albany Stewarts in 1424, but when the king turned against Alexander and the Highland clans in 1429, Alexander went to war against the king. Although defeated and forced to surrender, his authority in the Hebrides and western highlands was such that he remained a leading power in the kingdom. In 1431, while Alexander was in Tantallon Castle, a prisoner of the king, Clan Donald defeated James I's royal army at Inverlochy, and the king was forced to accept Alexander as Lord of the Isles and Master of Ross. Alexander gave his son Celestine Celestine of Lochalsh Lochalsh, Lochcarron, and Lochbroom in Wester Ross. He gave his son Uisdean (Hugh of Sleat) Sleat on Skye.

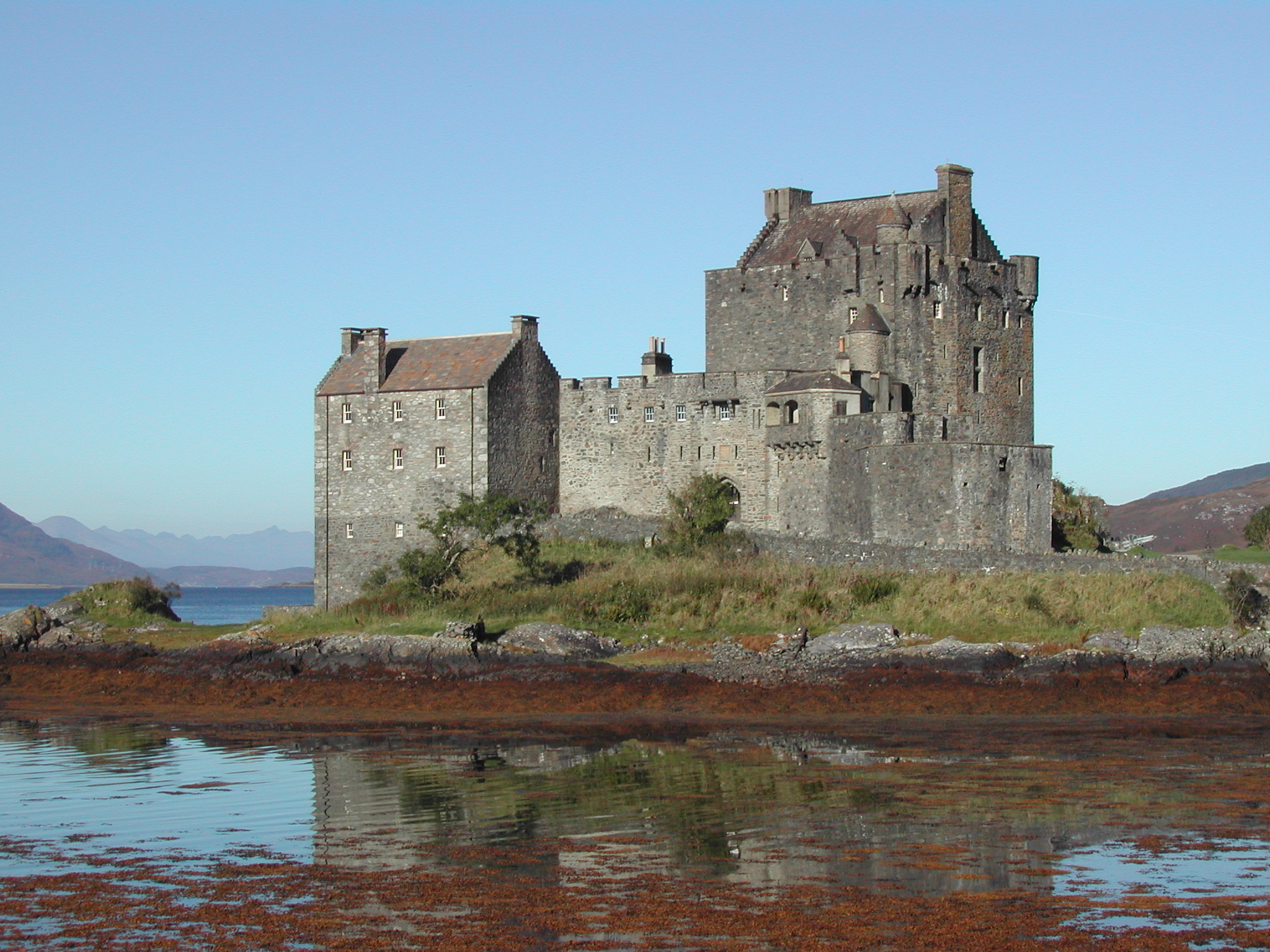
Eilean Donan Castle

The medieval clan MacDonald of Lochalsh was thus founded by Celestine (or Gilleasbaig) MacDonald of the Isles in the 15th century. He married Fynvola, a daughter of Lauchlan Bronach Maclean of Duart. On his death in 1473 he was succeeded by his own son, Alexander. In 1491 Alexander MacDonald of Lochalsh joined Clan Cameron in a raid into Ross where they fought with Clan MacKenzie of Kintail, advanced east to Badenoch where they were joined by the Clan Mackintosh, and then to Inverness where they took Inverness Castle. In 1495, threatened by King James's army, most of the Highland chiefs submitted. However, soon after Sir Alexander MacDonald again rebelled and invaded Ross-shire, where he was defeated in battle by Clan Munro and Clan MacKenzie at Drumchatt. He escaped to the Isles but was caught on Oransay and put to death. Although only a child at the time of his father Alexander's death, Donald Galda eventually inherited these lands having been exiled in the Lowlands by James IV for some time after the failed insurrection led by John of Islay, the last Lord of the Isles. These chiefs held the lands of Lochalsh, Lochcarron, Lochbroom and Locheil.

Donald died circa 1518 and by 1581 much of the lands of Lochalsh were controlled by Donald MacAngus of Glengarry through his grandmother Margaret, a sister and co-heiress of Donald. In the early 17th century Lochalsh was the scene of a violent feud between Clan Mackenzie and Clanranald of Glengarry during which the MacDonalds lost a galley with all hands in the waters of Loch Alsh.

Clan Matheson, led by the McRuari descendants of Somerled, were another power in the area, fighting for Donald of the Isles at the Battle of Harlaw in 1411 against an army commanded by Alexander Stewart, Earl of Mar. Later, as a result of a feud with Clan MacDonell of Glengarry, clan Matheson switched allegiance to the Mackenzies. John Dubh was killed in 1539 while defending Eilean Donan castle against MacDonald of Sleat. After this, the power of the clan declined although they retained property in Lochalsh and in Sutherland. Sir James Matheson of Sutherland was founder of the trading house of Jardine Matheson Holdings in the Far East. A Matheson still holds the title of Baronet of Lochalsh.

In 1580 a feud started between the Mackenzies and the Macdonells of Glengarry. The Chief of Glengarry had inherited part of Lochalsh, Lochcarron, and Lochbroom, while the father of Colin Cam Mackenzie of Kintail, a favourite of king James VI, had acquired the other part by purchase. Colin Cam MacKenzie took MacDonell prisoner and murdered his three uncles. The Privy Council investigated the matter and caused Strome Castle, which Macdonell yielded to Mackenzie as one of the conditions of his release, to be placed under the custody of the Earl of Argyll. MacKenzie of Kintail was briefly detained at Edinburgh, but shortly after pardoned by the king. His son Kenneth Mackenzie (c.1569–1611) successfully continued the bloody feud with the Macdonells of Glengarry and secured the entire island of Lewis in the Outer Hebrides. Kenneth's son Colin Mackenzie (1596/7-1633) became 1st Earl of Seaforth, with vast estates and wealth.

=== Calvinists and Jacobites ===
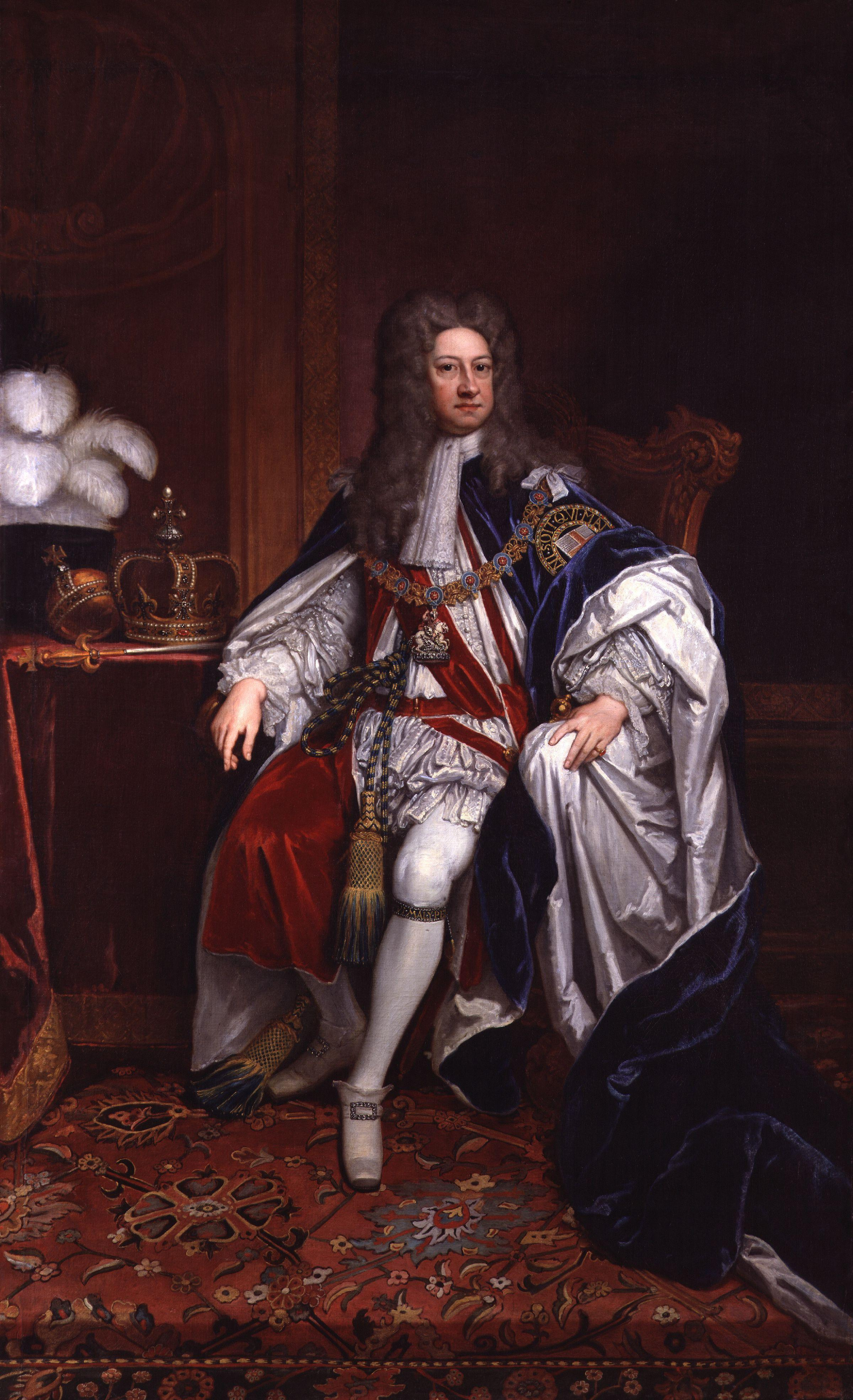
George I of Great Britain

Broader changes were to profoundly affect the traditional life of the clans. In 1560, inspired by John Knox, the Scottish Parliament abolished the jurisdiction of the pope in Scotland, condemned all doctrine and practice contrary to the reformed faith, and forbade the celebration of Mass. Many in the west and the islands resisted these changes, and continued to adhere to the Roman Catholic faith. In 1603 the crowns of England and Scotland were united when James VI became king James I of England. The English Revolution of 1640–1660 destroyed forever the principle of the absolute power of monarchs, and the Succession to the Crown Act 1707 ensured that no Catholic could hold the crown. In 1714, the elector of Hanover succeeded Queen Anne to become George I of Great Britain.

A Jacobite rising broke out in 1715 in an attempt to place Queen Anne's half-brother James on the throne. The Pretender's supporters led by Lord Mar instigated rebellion in Scotland. The rising was a dismal failure and collapsed by the end of the year. In 1719, Philip V of Spain lent support to a fresh attempt to restore the Stuart dynasty. He lent ships, troops and guns to George Keith, 10th Earl Marischal, landing him on the Isle of Lewis to raise troops. On 13 April 1719, Keith's men disembarked near Lochalsh, although the Highlanders did not join in the expected numbers. Keith could not proceed to Inverness as planned, and established his headquarters in the castle of Eilean Donan. The bulk of his army moved south to Glen Shiel, a few miles south of the head of Loch Duich. On 10 May, three ships of the Royal Navy arrived off the castle which they captured and destroyed. On 10 June 1719 at the Battle of Glen Shiel the Jacobites were defeated by an army of English and Scottish soldiers dispatched from Inverness. Yet another rising, in 1745-6, led by Charles Edward Stuart (Bonnie Prince Charlie) had more success, but collapsed when his Scottish soldiers refused to proceed from Derby to London. Prince Charlie was forced to flee, taking refuge on Skye for some time before escaping to the continent. There were no further challenges to the Hanoverian kings.

=== The Clearances and later events ===
The Jacobite risings resulted in laws that prohibited possession of swords and the wearing of tartans or kilts, ended the feudal bond of military service and removed the virtually sovereign power the chiefs had over their clan. The clan leaders became no more than wealthy landowners. Increasing demand in Britain for cattle and sheep, and the creation of new breeds of sheep which could be reared in the mountainous country, allowed higher rents to meet the costs of an aristocratic lifestyle. As a result, many families living on a subsistence level were displaced, emigrating in large numbers to Canada and elsewhere. Unrest was suppressed by troops where needed. The highland clearances continued steadily from 1762 onwards. Chiefs who once had been responsible for the welfare of their people became rich while the land was depopulated, a process that accelerated with the Highland Potato Famine of 1846–52 CE.

After the clearances, the greatly reduced population was employed in sheep raising, fishing, kelp gathering and weaving. The romantic but bloody days of clan warfare were a thing of the past. Although one of the poorest parts of Britain, conditions gradually improved. In 1897 the Highland Railway opened the Kyle of Lochalsh Line, connecting to the Skye ferry.

During World War II, Loch Alsh was a British naval base. On 26 November 1940 the mine layer HMS Port Napier dragged her anchor during a gale and sank in the Kyle of Loch Alsh. The wreck remains and may be visited by scuba divers.

In 1995 the Skye Bridge across the Kyle of Lochalsh was opened, connecting Skye to the mainland and causing the ferry to close. The use of tolls to recover the cost of building the bridge was the subject of much controversy.

In 2022 the Skye and Lochalsh attacks occurred, which were a group of shootings and a stabbing on 10 August. The attacks resulted in one person being killed and three injured, two of which were injured in Dornie.

== Local government ==
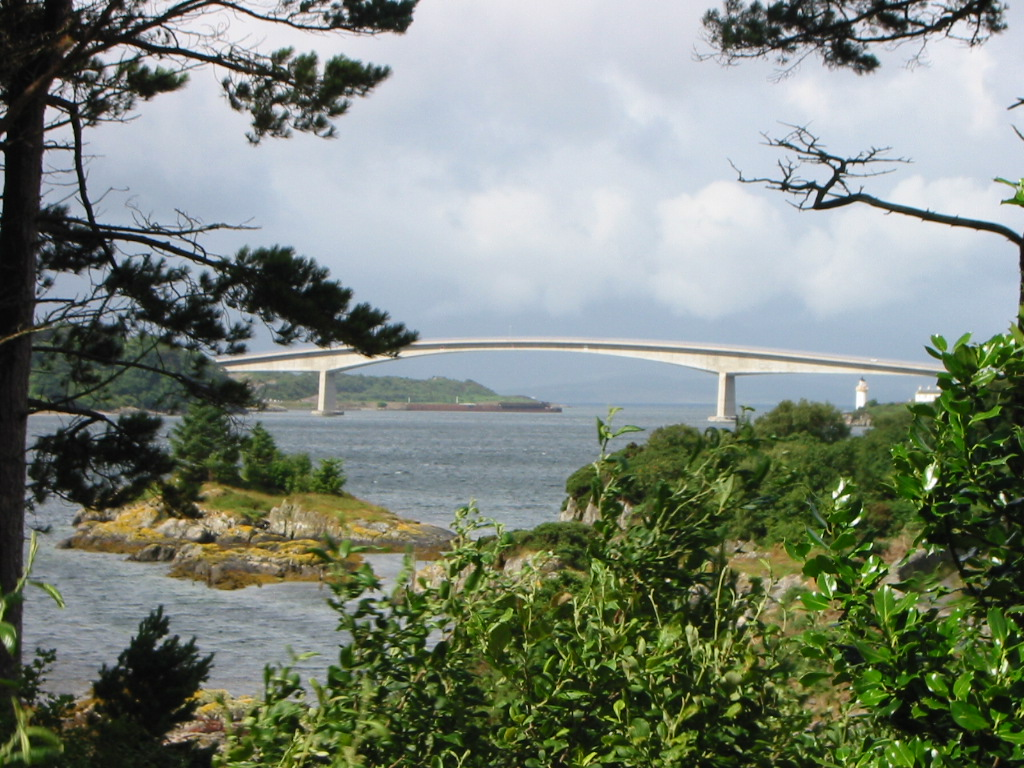
The Skye Bridge crossing the narrows of Loch Alsh from the mainland to Skye

In modern times, Skye and Lochalsh was one of the former local government districts of the two-tier Highland Region. The main offices of the Skye and Lochalsh district council were in Portree, on Skye. The districts was created in 1975, under the Local Government (Scotland) Act 1973, and abolished in 1996, under the Local Government etc (Scotland) Act 1994. Lochalsh is now within the Highland Council's Ross, Skye and Lochaber corporate management area.

== Lochalsh today ==
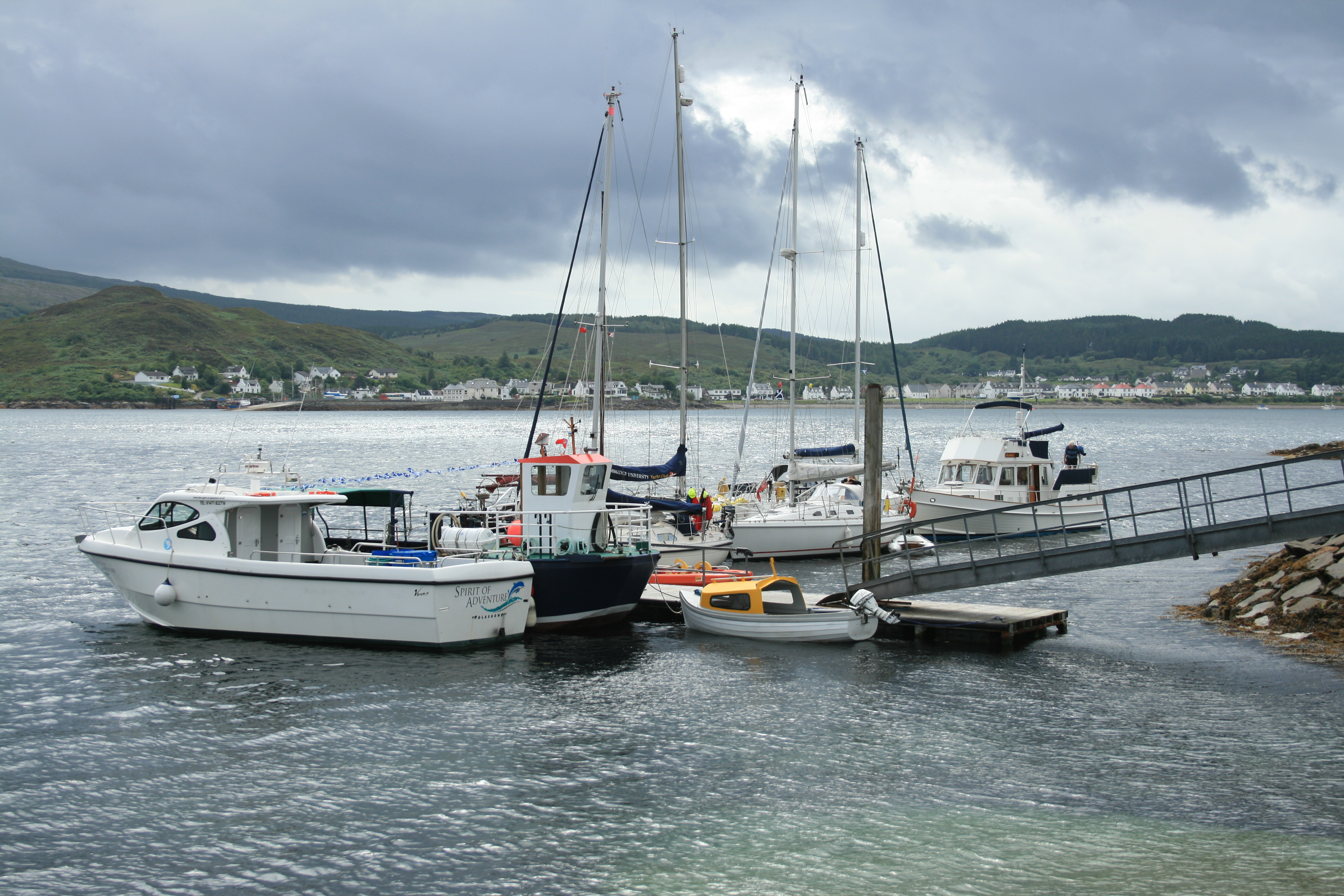
Yachting marina in the sheltered waters of Loch Alsh at Kyle

The area had a population of just 2,681 in 2017. The population is healthy, well-educated, growing very slowly and ageing. As of August 2003 the unemployment rate was 2.7%. Tourism is now central to the economy. The wholesale, hotels & restaurants sector is the largest employer with 26.8% of the workforce, followed closely by the Public Administration, Education & Health sector.

There are many attractions in the area for tourists, including hiking trails of varying levels of difficulty through magnificent scenery, boat trips, sea fishing, scuba diving and visits to the ruined Pictish brochs and later castles that remain from the region's turbulent past. The local food is generally simple but very high in quality.

The main population centres are Plockton & Achmore (749) and Kyle of Lochalsh (635).
