= Kilbeg =

Kilbeg or Cuilbeg (Irish: An Chill Bheag, meaning 'the little church' or Irish: An Choill Bheag, meaning 'the little wood') is a common place name in Ireland:

== Ireland ==
- Kilbeg, County Cavan
- Kilbeg, (townland), County Cork (1)
- Kilbeg, (townland), County Cork (2)
- Kilbeg, (townland), County Cork (3)
- Kilbeg, (townland), County Donegal
- Cuilbeg (townland), County Galway
- Kilbeg, (townland), County Galway (1)
- Kilbeg, (townland), County Galway (2)
- Kilbeg, (townland), County Galway (3)
- Kilbeg, (townland), County Galway (4)
- Kilbeg, (townland), County Galway (5)
- Kilbeg, (townland), County Kildare
- Kilbeg, (townland), County Laois
- Cuilbeg (townland), County Mayo
- Kilbeg, formerly Kilbeg (Malone), (townland), County Mayo
- Kilbeg (civil parish), County Meath
- Kilbeg, (townland), County Offaly
- Cuilbeg (townland), County Roscommon
- Kilbeg, (townland), County Roscommon
- Cuilbeg (townland), County Sligo
- Kilbeg, (townland), County Tipperary (1)
- Kilbeg, (townland), County Tipperary (2)
- Kilbeg, (townland), County Tipperary (3)
- Kilbeg, (townland), County Waterford (1)
- Kilbeg, (townland), County Waterford (2)
- Kilbeg, (townland), County Westmeath
- Kilbeg, (townland), County Wicklow

== Scotland ==
- Sabhal Mòr Ostaig, Isle of Skye
