= Teangue =

Village on the Isle of Skye, Scotland

Coordinates: 57.114°N 5.863°W

Teangue: Scottish Gaelic: An Teanga
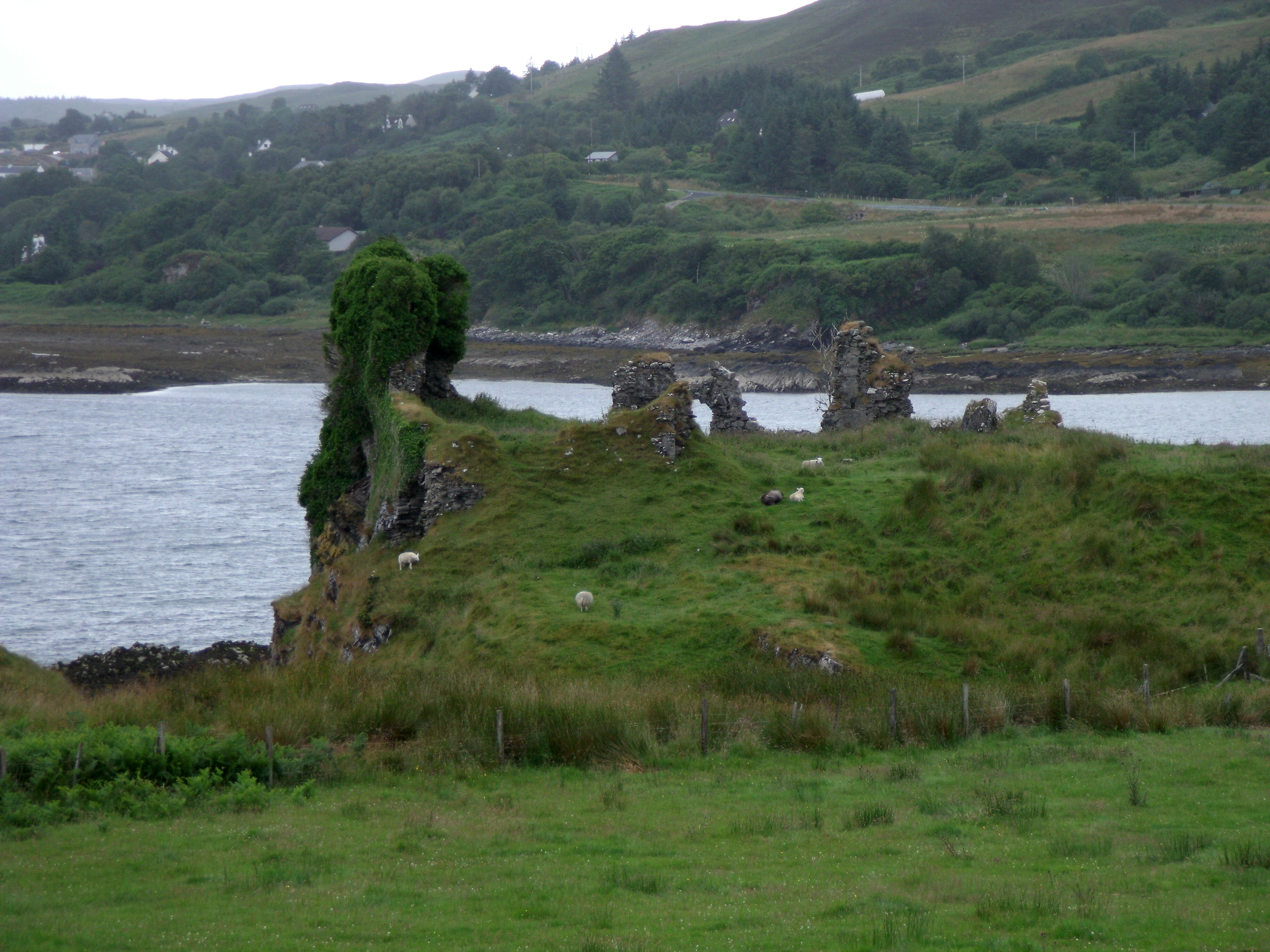
- Knock Castle

- Location within the Isle of Skye
- OS grid reference: NG664089
- Council area: Highland
- Country: Scotland
- Sovereign state: United Kingdom
- Post town: ISLE OF SKYE
- Postcode district: IV44
- Police: Scotland
- Fire: Scottish
- Ambulance: Scottish

Teangue (Scottish Gaelic: An Teanga) is a fishing village on the Sleat peninsula, Isle of Skye, Highlands of Scotland. It is situated in Knock Bay on the west side of the Sound of Sleat. It is in the Scottish council area of Highland.

Knock Castle is located to the west of the village.

The A851 road passes through Ferrindonald.

In 2022, a man was killed after he was shot at a property in Teangue during the Skye and Lochalsh attacks.

== Economy ==
Torabhaig distillery is a Scotch whisky distillery that opened in 2017 in Teangue.
