= Torabhaig distillery =

Whisky distillery in Teangue, Scotland

Coordinates: 57°6′46.85″N 5°50′54.8″W

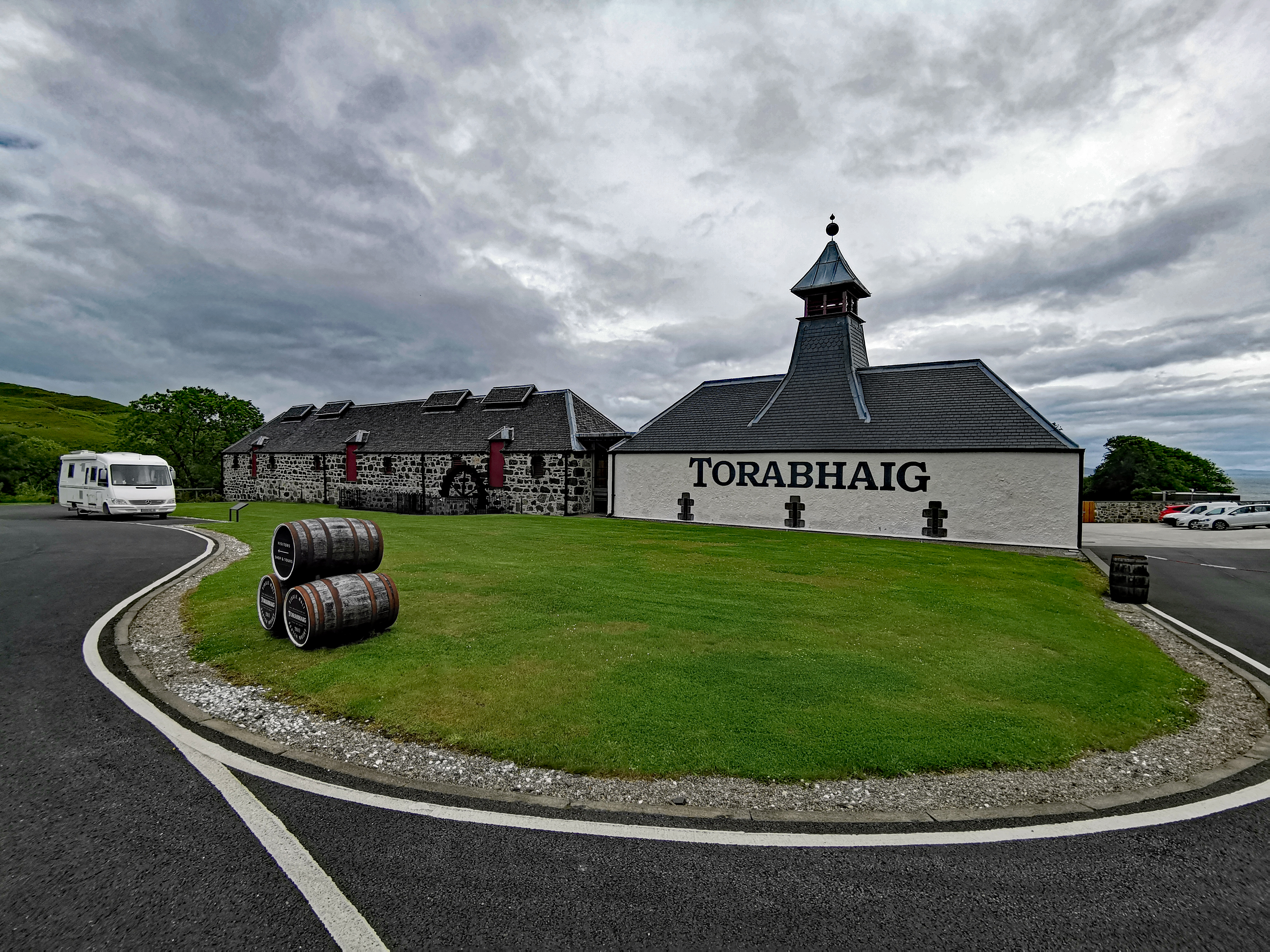
- Torabhaig distillery, 2019
- Location: Teangue, Sleat, Scotland
- Owner: Mossburn Distillers
- Founded: January 2017
- Founder: Sir Iain Noble
- Water source: Allt Gleann Thorabhaig and the Allt Breacach
- No. of stills: 1 wash still 1 spirit still
- Capacity: 0.5 million-Lpa (liters of pure alcohol)
- Website: torabhaig.com
- ABV: 46%

Torabhaig distillery is a Scotch whisky distillery in Teangue on the Isle of Skye. The distillery is the second ever licensed distillery on Skye and the first since Talisker was established in 1830.

== History ==
The distillery project was given planning permission in 2002 under its original owner Sir Iain Noble but on his death, it was acquired by Mossburn Distillers, a subsidiary of Marussia Beverages BV. Work began in 2014 to a design by the architects Simpson and Brown. In 2014, the distillery was estimated to cost more than £5 million. The distillery was incorporated into a converted former farm steading and completed in 2017.

In 2019, the distillery adopted a baby goat named 'Goaty' as its official mascot.

In 2021, the distillery auctioned two bottles of its first whisky for charity.

== Facilities ==
The distillery has a production stated to be 500,000 litres per year in traditional wooden washbacks and two copper stills. The distillery has a visitor centre.

== Products ==
The first whisky expression from the distillery was sold in February 2021 entitled the 'Legacy Series 2017'.

The second whisky available from the distillery is 'Allt Gleann single malt' which is named after one of the burns that feed the distillery. It was released in summer 2021 and bottled at 46% abv as the second of four expressions in the Legacy series. In 2022, some of the whisky was selected for preservation by the National Museum of Scotland.

The whiskies are described as of a peat character.
