= Skye and Wester Ross attacks =

2022 shootings and stabbing in Skye and Lochalsh

- Locations of the Skye and Lochalsh attacks
- Location: Skye and Lochalsh, Scotland, UK
- Date: 10 August 2022 c. 9:00 a.m. – c. 10:00 a.m. (UTC+1)
- Attack type: shooting, stabbing
- Weapon: Firearm
- Deaths: 1
- Injuries: 3
- Charges: Murder; Attempted murder (×3)

A series of shootings and a stabbing occurred on 10 August 2022 on the Isle of Skye and in Lochalsh (Skye and Lochalsh). The attacks resulted in one person being killed and three injured.

== Attacks ==
=== Tarskavaig ===
At 9:02 a.m. BST, police were initially called to a property in Tarskavaig, Skye, after a report of a 32-year-old woman sustaining critical injuries after being stabbed. She was airlifted to Queen Elizabeth University Hospital in Glasgow.

=== Teangue ===
At about 9:30 a.m., officers were called to an incident in Teangue, Skye, 8 mi (13 km) away from Tarskavaig. The police said a firearm had been discharged and a man, aged 47, had died at the scene.

=== Dornie ===
At around 10 a.m., they were called to an incident in Dornie, Lochalsh, about 26 mi (42 km) away from Teangue, where a gun had also been fired. A man and woman, both aged 63, were injured and taken to Raigmore Hospital in Inverness and Broadford Hospital in Skye respectively.

Police said that the incidents were linked and that a 39-year-old man (later named as Finlay MacDonald) had been arrested, with a taser being discharged during the arrest. He was also taken to Raigmore Hospital. Multiple ambulances, air ambulances, an Emergency Medical Retrieval Service and a special operations response team were involved.

== Aftermath ==
On 11 August 2022, Finlay MacDonald was charged with the murder of his brother-in-law John McKinnon and the attempted murders of three others. It was confirmed that his 32-year-old wife Rowena McDonald and 63-year-old chiropractor John Donald MacKenzie were still in hospital with serious injuries, but that MacKenzie's 63-year-old wife Fay had been released.

On 12 August 2022, MacDonald appeared at Inverness Sheriff Court. He made no plea and was remanded in custody. He faces a murder charge, and two charges of assault to severe injury, danger of life and attempted murder, and a third charge of assault to severe injury, permanent disfigurement and attempted murder. At the time his wife remained at Queen Elizabeth University Hospital in critical condition, whilst the 63-year-old man remained at Raigmore Hospital in serious condition.

On 27 July 2023, at a hearing at the High Court in Glasgow, the date for MacDonald's trial was set for 14 May 2024. MacDonald plead not guilty to all charges, through his lawyer Shahid Latif. On 29 November 2024, MacDonald was found guilty and sentenced to life imprisonment with a minimum term of 28 years.

== See also ==
- 2020 Reading stabbings
- Cumbria shootings
- Dunblane massacre
- Glasgow hotel stabbings
