= Ferindonald =

Coordinates: 57.09714°N 5.87047°W

Ferindonald: Scottish Gaelic: Fearann Dòmhnaill
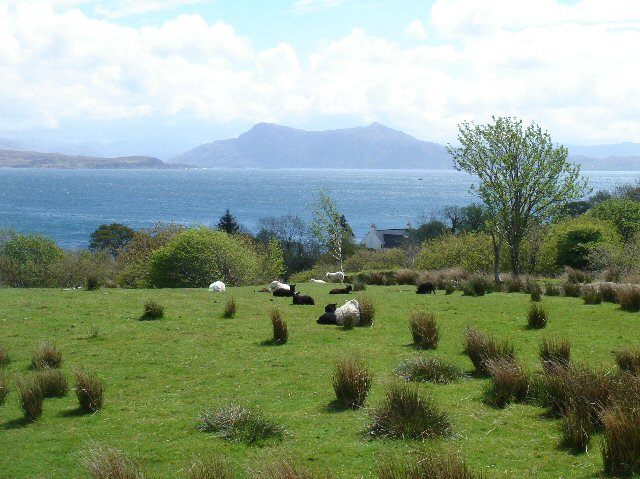
- Ferindonald

- Location within the Isle of Skye
- OS grid reference: NG656073
- Council area: Highland
- Country: Scotland
- Sovereign state: United Kingdom
- Post town: Teangue
- Postcode district: IV44 8
- Police: Scotland
- Fire: Scottish
- Ambulance: Scottish

Ferindonald or Ferrindonald (Scottish Gaelic: Fearann Dòmhnaill) is a crofting township, located on the east coast of the Sleat peninsula, lying on the A851 road, in the Isle of Skye, Scottish Highlands and is in the Scottish council area of Highland.

Ferindonald is located 1/4 mile (400 metres) southwest of Saasaig and 1 1/2 miles (2.5 kilometres) of Teangue.
