= A851 road =

Road in Scotland

Coordinates: 57.1509°N 5.8020°W

A851

Major junctions
- North end: Armadale
- A87
- South end: Scullamus

Location
- Country: United Kingdom
- Constituent country: Scotland

Road network
- Roads in the United Kingdom; Motorways; A and B road zones

The A851 road is one of the principal roads of the Isle of Skye in the Inner Hebrides off the west coast of mainland Scotland.

It connects the ferry port of Armadale on the south of the island with the A87 road for Portree and the Scottish mainland. It is just under 15 miles in length.

== Settlements on or near the A851 ==
North to South

- Duisdalemore
- Isleornsay
- Knock
- Teangue
- Saasaig
- Ferrindonald
- Kilmore
- Kilbeg
- Ardvasar
- Armadale
