= Dornie =

Village in Kintail, Ross-shire, Scotland

Coordinates: 57.2763°N 5.5156°W

Dornie: Scottish Gaelic: An Dòrnaidh
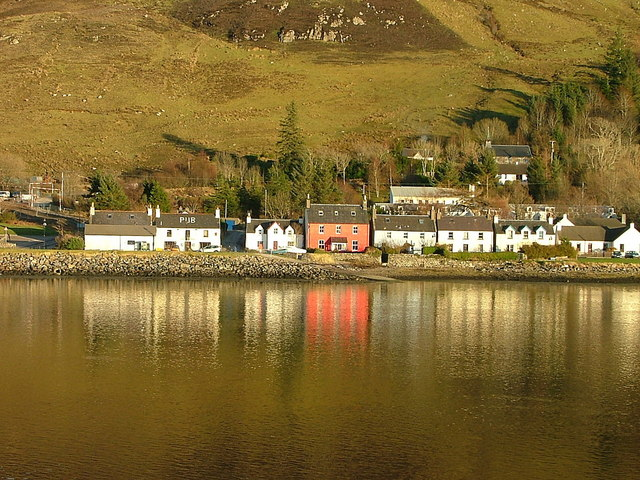

- Location within the Ross and Cromarty area
- Population: 360
- OS grid reference: NG881261
- Council area: Highland
- Country: Scotland
- Sovereign state: United Kingdom
- Post town: Dornie
- Postcode district: IV40 8
- Police: Scotland
- Fire: Scottish
- Ambulance: Scottish
- UK Parliament: Inverness, Skye and West Ross-shire
- Scottish Parliament: Skye, Lochaber and Badenoch

Dornie (Scottish Gaelic: An Dòrnaidh) is a small former fishing village in the Lochalsh district in western Ross-shire Highlands of Scotland (2006 census). It is near the meeting point of Loch Duich, Loch Alsh and Loch Long.

The A87, the main road to Skye, passes just outside the village. Before the construction of the bridge, the main road passed through the centre of the village and crossed Loch Long via a short ferry ride. Amongst bagpipers, the tune "Dornie Ferry" is a well-known strathspey.

Eilean Donan is a famous castle on a nearby island. The village itself runs alongside the water hosting a variety of village homes, one tiny shop, a hotel and two bars.

St Duthac's Catholic Church dates from 1860 and was designed by architect Joseph A. Hansom. It is in the Gothic style with a stone reredos of polished granite shafts and a demi-octagonal stone pulpit, an unusual feature in a Scottish church.

In 2022, two people were injured in Dornie during the Skye and Lochalsh attacks.
