= Ionad Chaluim Chille Ìle =

Gaelic-medium college on Islay, Scotland

Ionad Chaluim Chille Ìle ('The Islay Columba Centre') is a Gaelic medium college on the shores of Loch Indaal, on Islay, in Scotland. Named after Saint Columba (Scottish Gaelic: Calum Cille), it was founded in 2002 as part of the University of the Highlands and Islands, and is in a partnership with Sabhal Mòr Ostaig on Skye.

The Centre teaches Gaelic language, culture and heritage by offering Gaelic classes, short courses, and bachelor's degrees through its partnership with Sabhal Mòr Ostaig. The centre has a Gaelic library and raises money by renting out rooms.

It is not to be confused with the similarly named Arainn Chaluim Chille, one of the campuses of Sabhal Mòr Ostaig on Skye.
