= Knock Castle (Isle of Skye) =

Castle in Highland, Scotland

Coordinates: 57°6′36.83″N 5°50′49.94″W

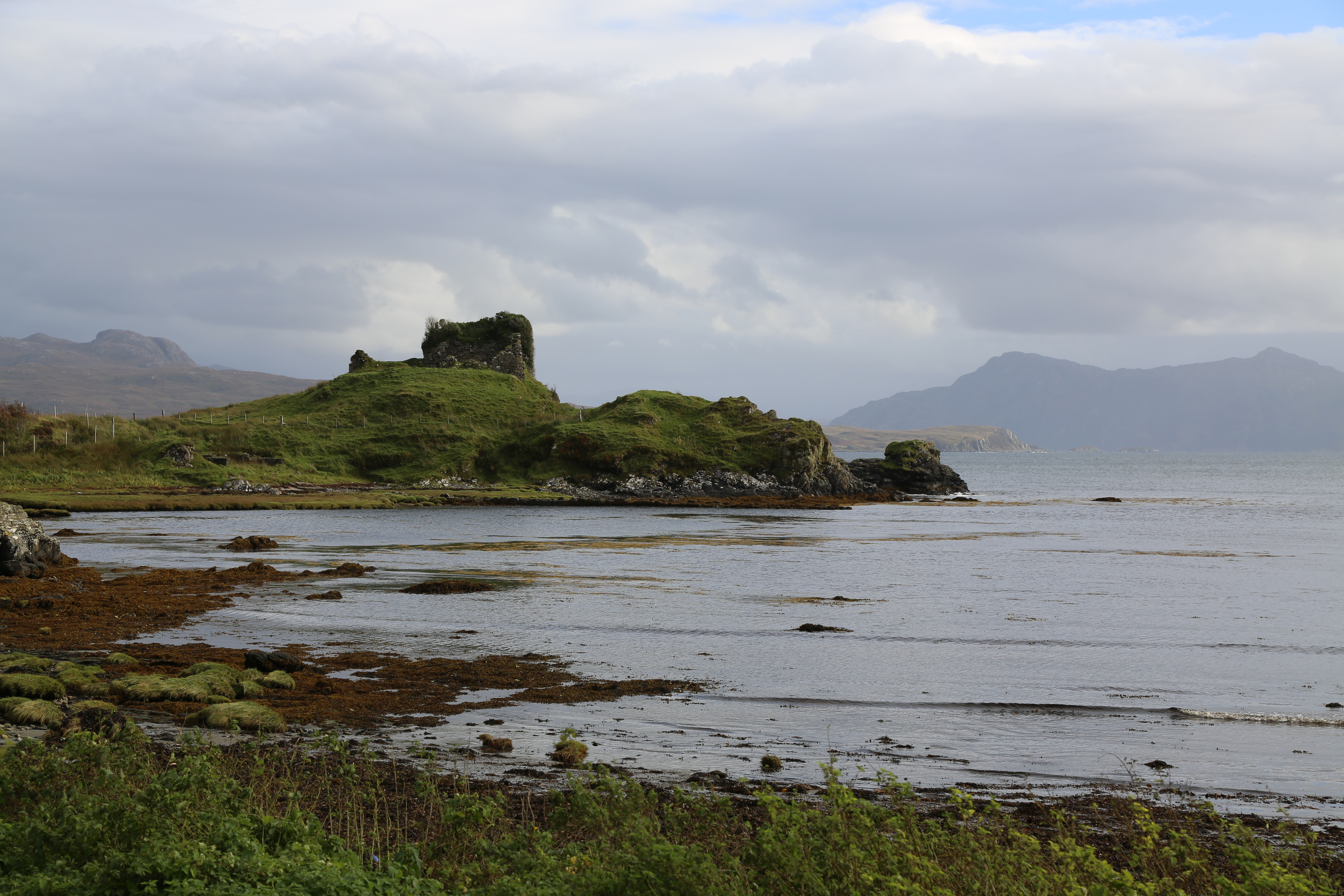
Knock Castle on the Isle of Skye, Sleat.

Knock Castle, also known as Caisteal Chamuis (Castle Camus) is a former stronghold of Clan MacLeod of Lewis and later, MacDonalds. It lies on the east coast of Sleat, approximately five miles (8.0 km) north of Armadale on the Isle of Skye, south of Cnoc Uaine, on the eastern side of Knock Bay. Currently the castle is in ruins; it consists of an old 15th century keep of which one part, a window, remains to some height with traces of later buildings.

The castle was constructed by the Clan MacLeod and later captured by the Clan MacDonald in the late 15th century. Ownership of the castle passed between the two clans several times. It was remodelled in 1596 by the MacDonalds. By 1689 the castle was abandoned and started to decay. Most of the stones were then used for nearby buildings.

It is claimed by local ghostlore that the castle is haunted by a Green Lady or glaistig – a ghost associated with the fortunes of the family who occupy the castle. The ghost will appear happy if good news is to come; if there is bad news she will weep. The castle is also said to have had a gruagach, a spirit which is said to have a particular concern with caring for the livestock.

== Touring Knock Castle ==
The easiest approach to the castle is by following the trail upward after passing the farm building. On the right hand side after the farm building are the remains of what appears to be a blacksmith's forge.

The castle is in a state of heavy decay and is not maintained. Travelers are advised to proceed at their own risk, as the old masonry work can be unstable. The castle itself is surrounded on three sides by a very steep cliff, and footing can be slippery during rains.

The ruins are a scheduled monument.
