= Sound of Sleat =

Narrow sea channel off the western coast of Scotland

Coordinates: 57.109°N 5.776°W

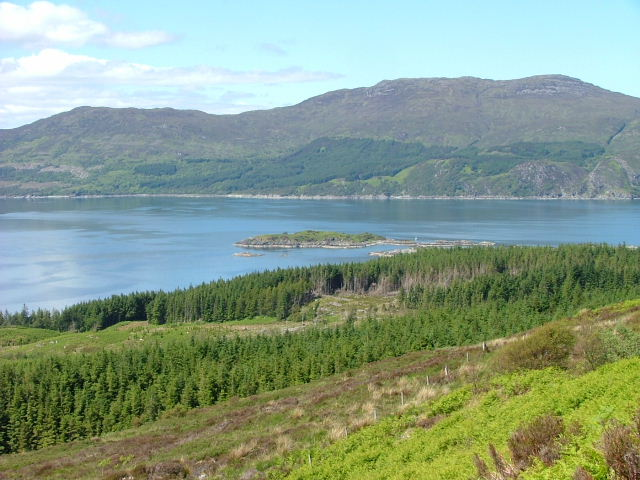
Sound of Sleat

The Sound of Sleat (/ˈsleɪt/ SLATE) is a narrow sea channel off the western coast of Scotland. It divides the Sleat peninsula on the south-east side of the Isle of Skye from Morar, Knoydart and Glenelg on the Scottish mainland.

The Sound extends in a south-south west direction for 19 1/2 miles (31.5 kilometres) from Loch Alsh. It is widest (7 3/4 mi or 12.5 km) at the south-west entrance and narrows to just 1/4 mi (400 m) at Kyle Rhea, a narrow channel which connects the Sound through to Loch Alsh.

The name, pronounced like "slate" and inherited from the peninsula to the north of the Sound, is an anglicization of the Scottish Gaelic name Slèite or Sléibhte. Iain Mac an Tàilleir has claimed that this derives in turn from Old Norse sléttr (smooth, even). Sléibhte means mountains in Gaelic.

On the mainland side of the Sound are the entrances to Loch Nevis and Loch Hourn. The largest settlement on the mainland side is Mallaig which sits at the entrance to the Sound. On the Skye side of the Sound sit Knock Castle, a former stronghold of the MacDonalds, and the village of Armadale.

The Sound is traversed on a regular basis in the summer by a ferry operating between Glenelg and Kylerhea. A Caledonian MacBrayne ferry operates between Mallaig and Armadale throughout the year.
