= Point of Sleat Lighthouse =

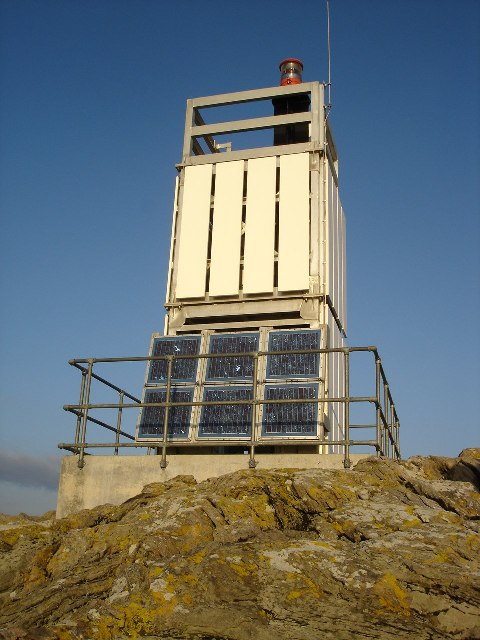
- Point of Sleat Lighthouse closeup
- Location: Isle of Skye, Point of Sleat, Highland, United Kingdom
- Coordinates: 57°01′06″N 6°01′03″W

Tower
- Constructed: 1934 (first)
- Foundation: reinforced concrete
- Construction: metal skeletal tower
- Automated: 2003
- Height: 5 m (16 ft)
- Shape: quadrangular tower covered by aluminium panels with balcony and light on the top
- Markings: white tower
- Power source: solar power
- Operator: Northern Lighthouse Board

Light
- First lit: 2003 (current)
- Deactivated: 2003 (first)
- Focal height: 20 m (66 ft)
- Range: 9 nmi (17 km; 10 mi)
- Characteristic: Fl W 3s

The Point of Sleat Lighthouse is a lighthouse on Skye in the Inner Hebrides, Scotland. It was built in 1934 at the Point of Sleat at the southern end of the island. In 2003 the tower was dismantled and replaced by a concrete structure with a solar powered light.

== See also ==
- List of lighthouses in Scotland
- List of Northern Lighthouse Board lighthouses
