= Armadale Castle =

Scottish castle on the Isle of Skye

Coordinates: 57°04′22″N 5°53′56″W

Designations

Inventory of Gardens and Designed Landscapes in Scotland
- Official name: Armadale Castle
- Designated: 30 June 1987
- Reference no.: GDL00028

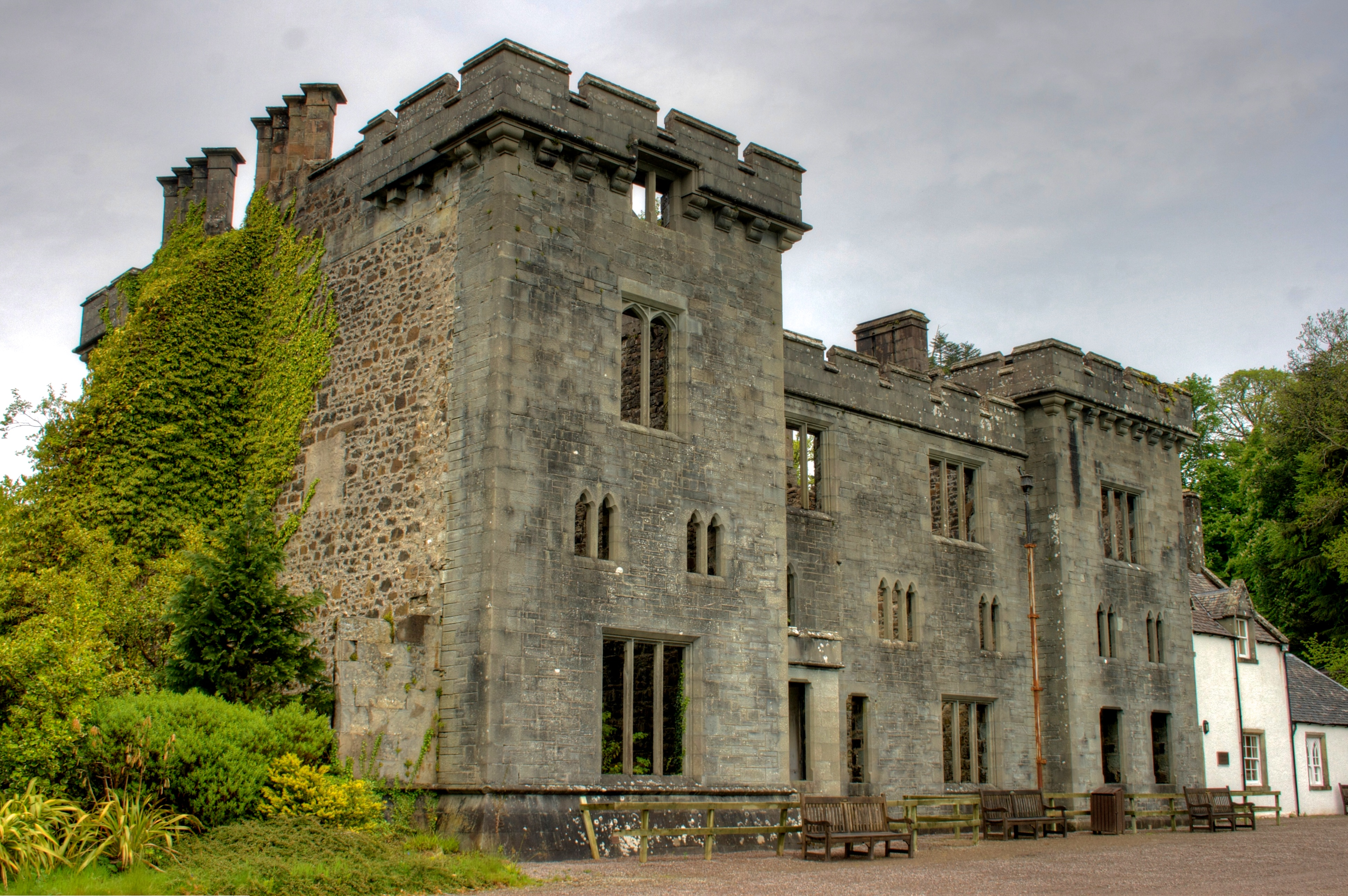
Armadale castle ruins

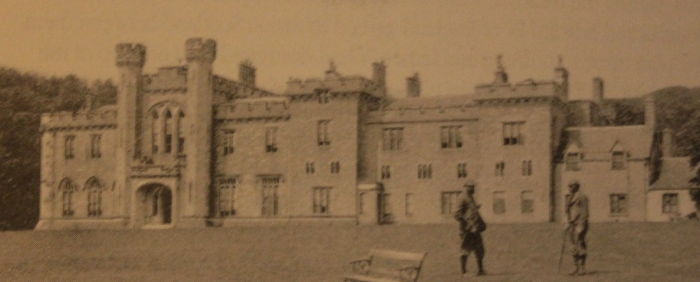
Armadale Castle c.1910, showing the lost Gillespie Graham section on the left

Armadale Castle is a ruined country house in Armadale, Skye, former home of the MacDonalds.

== History ==
A mansion house was first built here around 1790, facing south-east over the Sound of Sleat. In 1815 a square Tudor-Gothic mock-castle, intended for show rather than defence, designed by Edinburgh architect James Gillespie Graham, was built next to the house.

After 1855 the part of the house destroyed by fire was replaced by a central wing, designed by David Bryce. Since 1925 the castle, abandoned by the Macdonald family, has fallen into ruin. The gardens around the castle have been maintained, and are now home to the Clan Donald Centre, which operates the Museum of the Isles.

All the southern (Gillespie-Graham) sections of the building were demolished in 1971, leaving the (roofless) David Bryce section and a less formal two storey wing on the far north side. The remnant section is only listed category C due to its ruinous condition. The gardens are protected as a Designed Landscape.

On 24 March 2025, the Clan Donald Lands Trust announced that it would be listing the Armadale Estate, including the castle, museum and 20,000 acres for private sale due to financial struggles and insolvency. The first listing for the 20,000 acres was posted on 26 March 2025. On 14 June 2025, the second half of the listing, involving the heritage sites, was listed.
