= Bun-sgoil Shlèite =

School on the Isle of Skye, Scotland

Coordinates: 57.0898°N 5.8716°W

Bun-sgoil Shlèite is a primary school on the Sleat peninsula of the island of Skye in Scotland. It is Scotland's only Gaelic Medium School with an English department. It was established in August 2007 though the building originally opened in November 1983.

== Gaelic medium education ==
In January 2006, Highland Council decided to conduct a formal consultation on a proposal to change Sleat Primary School to a dedicated Gaelic school. The responses indicated that community and parents' views were polarised between those preferring exclusively English and Gaelic educations. The Education, Culture and Sport Committee of the Council met on 21 September 2006 to make a final decision, opting for the compromise of a Gaelic medium school with an English department.

== Visual arts project ==
In 2009, pupils from the school, along with pupils from Tollcross Primary School in Edinburgh started an 18-month visual art and nature project, designed to link the children who experience Gaelic Medium Education in very different environments with Tollcross being in urban Edinburgh, with a Gaelic unit within an otherwise English-speaking school, and Bun Sgoil Shlèite being on the rural Sleat peninsula of Skye, with all the teaching in Gaelic, apart from its small English department.

== See also ==
- Gaelic medium education
- Gaelscoileanna for Irish-gaelic medium education in Ireland.
