= Armadale, Skye =

Coordinates: 57.062454°N 5.905501°W

Armadale: Scottish Gaelic: Armadal
- Location within the Isle of Skye
- OS grid reference: NG633036
- Council area: Highland
- Lieutenancy area: Ross and Cromarty
- Country: Scotland
- Sovereign state: United Kingdom
- Post town: ISLE OF SKYE
- Postcode district: IV45
- Dialling code: 01471
- Police: Scotland
- Fire: Scottish
- Ambulance: Scottish
- UK Parliament: Inverness, Skye and West Ross-shire
- Scottish Parliament: Skye, Lochaber and Badenoch

Armadale (Scottish Gaelic: Armadal) is a village near the southern end of the Sleat peninsula on the Isle of Skye, in the Highland council area of Scotland. Like most of Sleat, but unlike most of Skye, the area is fairly fertile, and though there are hills, most do not reach a great height. It looks out over the Sound of Sleat, to Morar and Mallaig.

== Entymology ==
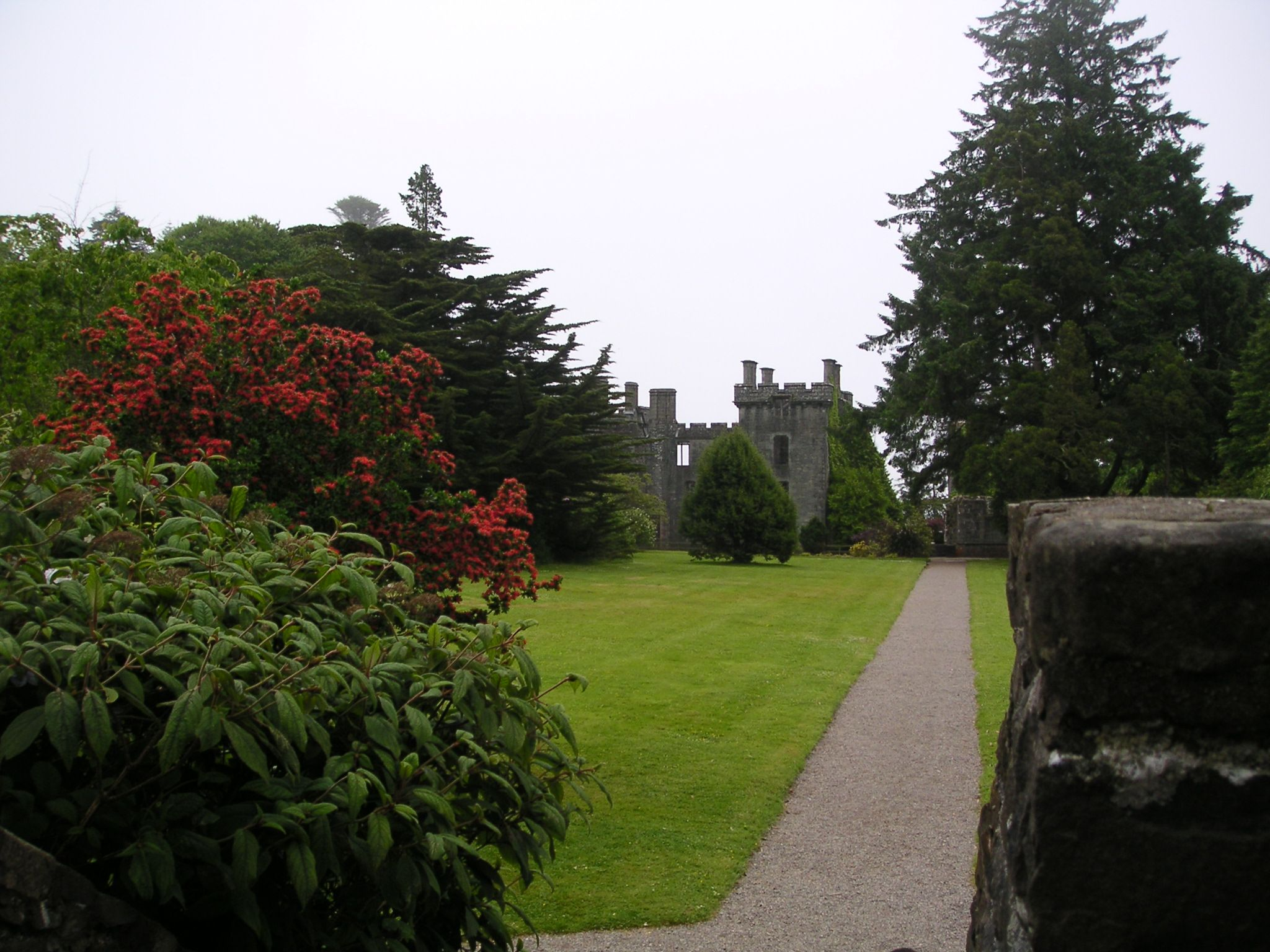
Armadale castle and gardens

The name ’Armadale’, meaning ‘elongated valley’, derives from the Old Norse armr and dalr.

== Visitor center ==
Clan Donald has a visitor centre, Armadale Castle, situated next to the ruins of Armadale Castle and surrounded by large gardens, while the nearby Sabhal Mòr Ostaig is a centre of Gaelic learning. The castle grounds are home to the Museum of the Isles, which explores the history of Clan Donald and the wider Highlands and Islands. The estate spans 40 acres of gardens and woodland trails, and is a popular destination for visitors interested in heritage and nature.

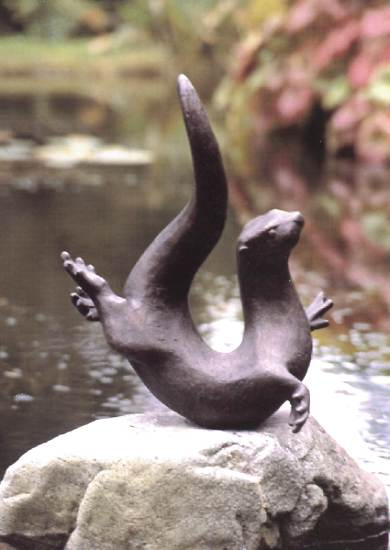
Bronze otter sculpture by Laurence Broderick in the gardens of Armadale Castle.

== Port ==
The village is also a small port, and has a regular Caledonian MacBrayne ferry service to Mallaig. It is at the southern end of the A851 road. When walking on the beach near the pier, it is possible to see otters and seals.

== Ferry service ==
Preceding station	Ferry	Following station
Terminus	Caledonian MacBrayne; Skye ferry	Mallaig
