= Sleat =

Peninsula and civil parish in Scotland

Coordinates: 57.11016°N 5.93223°W

Map showing the location of Sleat within Scotland

Sleat (/ˈsleɪt/ SLATE) is a peninsula and civil parish on the island of Skye in the Highland council area of Scotland, known as "the garden of Skye". It is the home of the clan MacDonald of Sleat. The name comes from the Scottish Gaelic Slèite, which in turn comes from Old Norse sléttr (smooth, even), which well describes Sleat when considered in the surrounding context of the mainland, Skye and Rùm mountains that dominate the horizon all about Sleat.

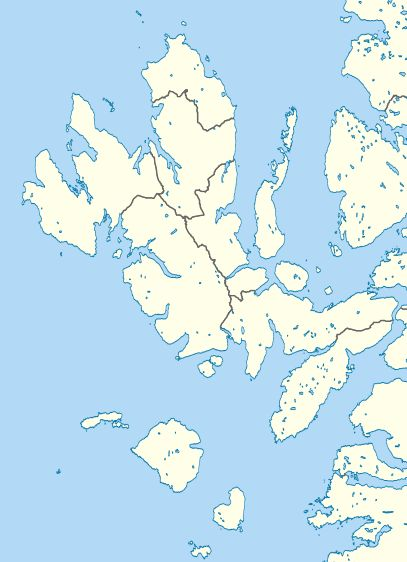

== Geography ==
The peninsula extends from an isthmus between the heads of Loch Eishort and Loch na Dal for 13 miles (21 km) southwest to Point of Sleat at the southern tip of Skye. It is bounded on the northwest by Loch Eishort and on the southeast by the Sound of Sleat. Most of Sleat, unlike most of Skye, is fairly fertile, and though there are hills, most do not reach a great height.

== History ==
The Annual Reports of the Fishery Board for Scotland provide an insight into the state of fishing from Sleat in the years before the First World War.

Fishery Statistics

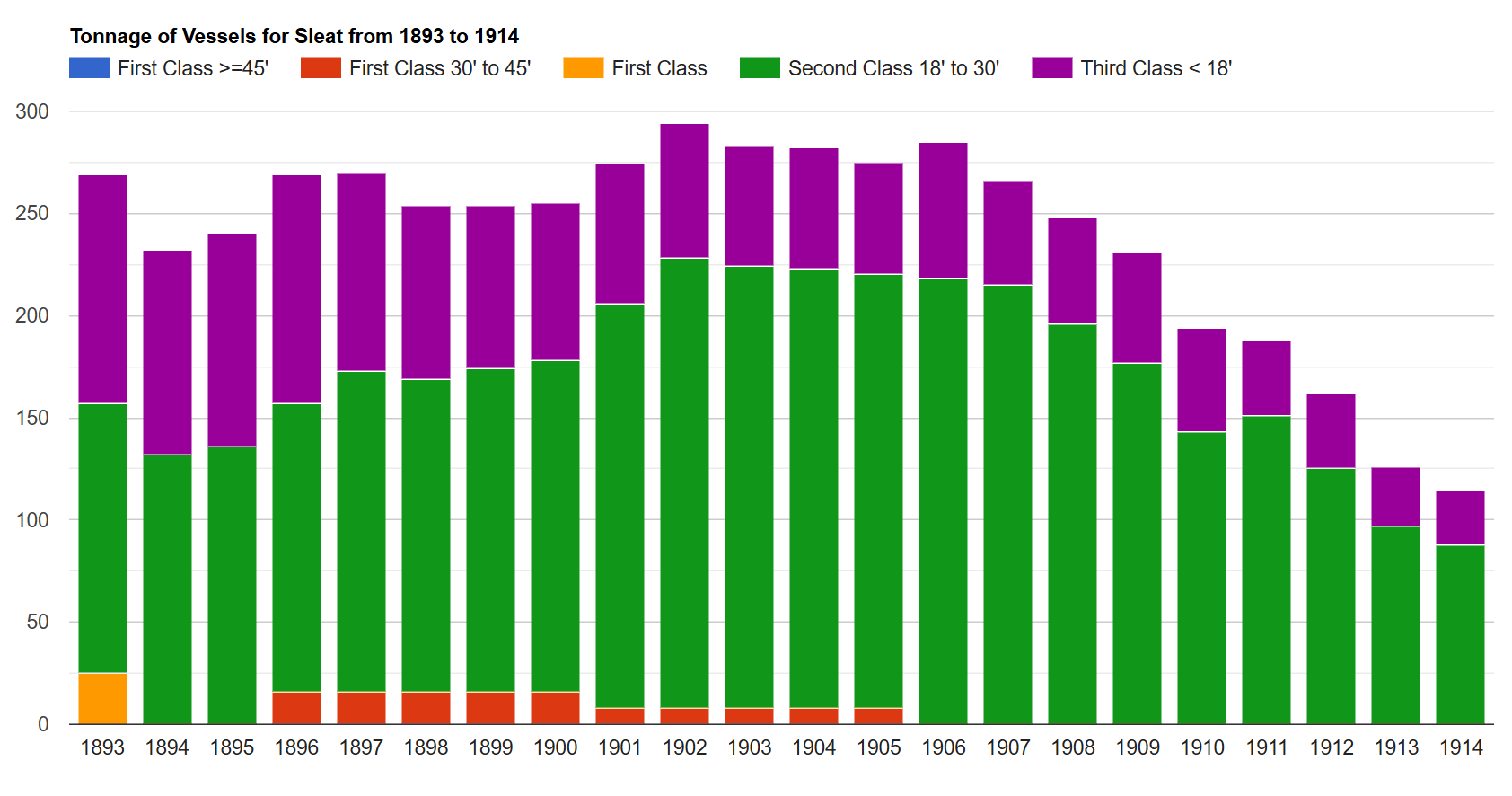
Tonnage of vessels

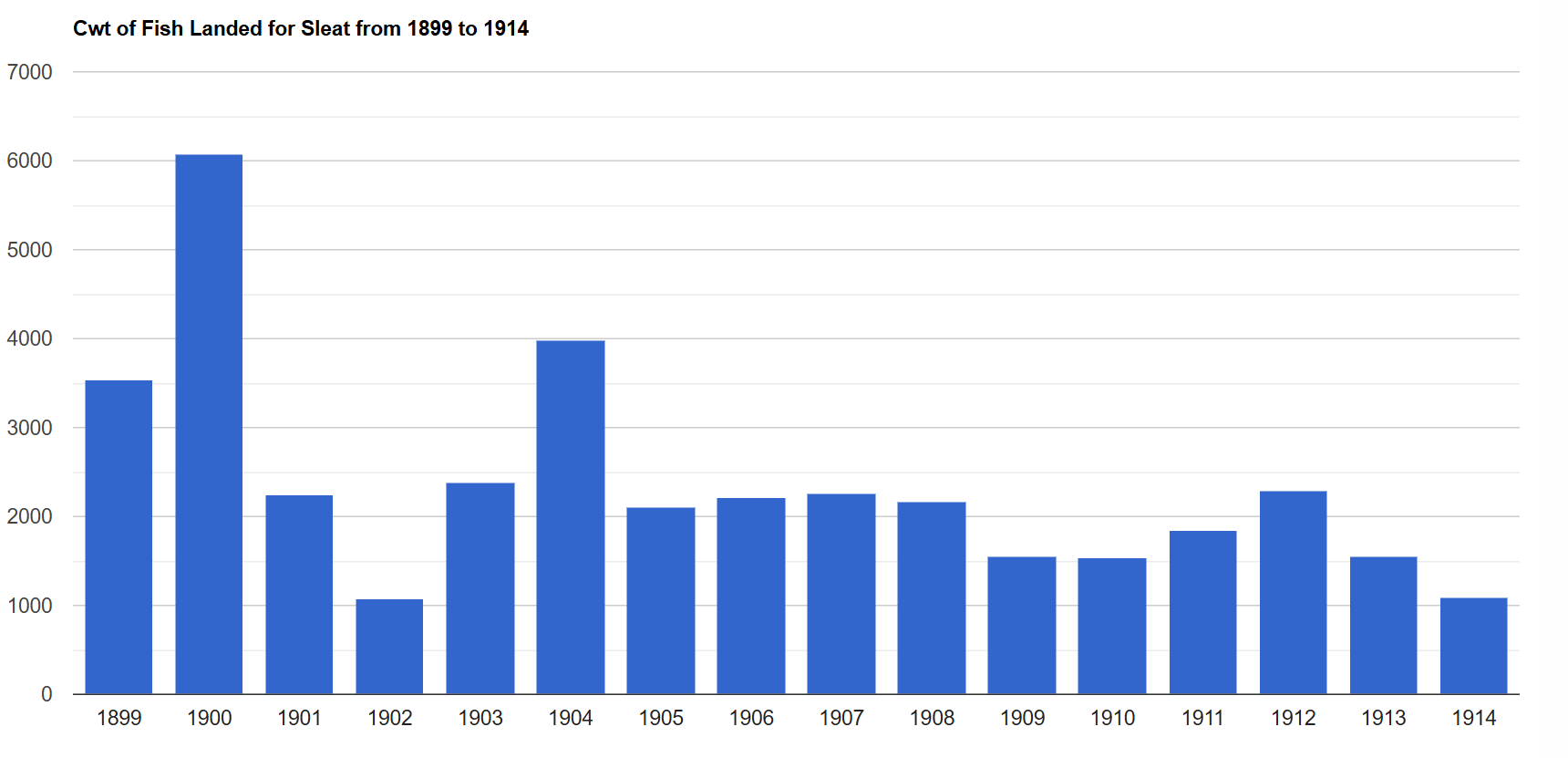
Cwt of fish landed

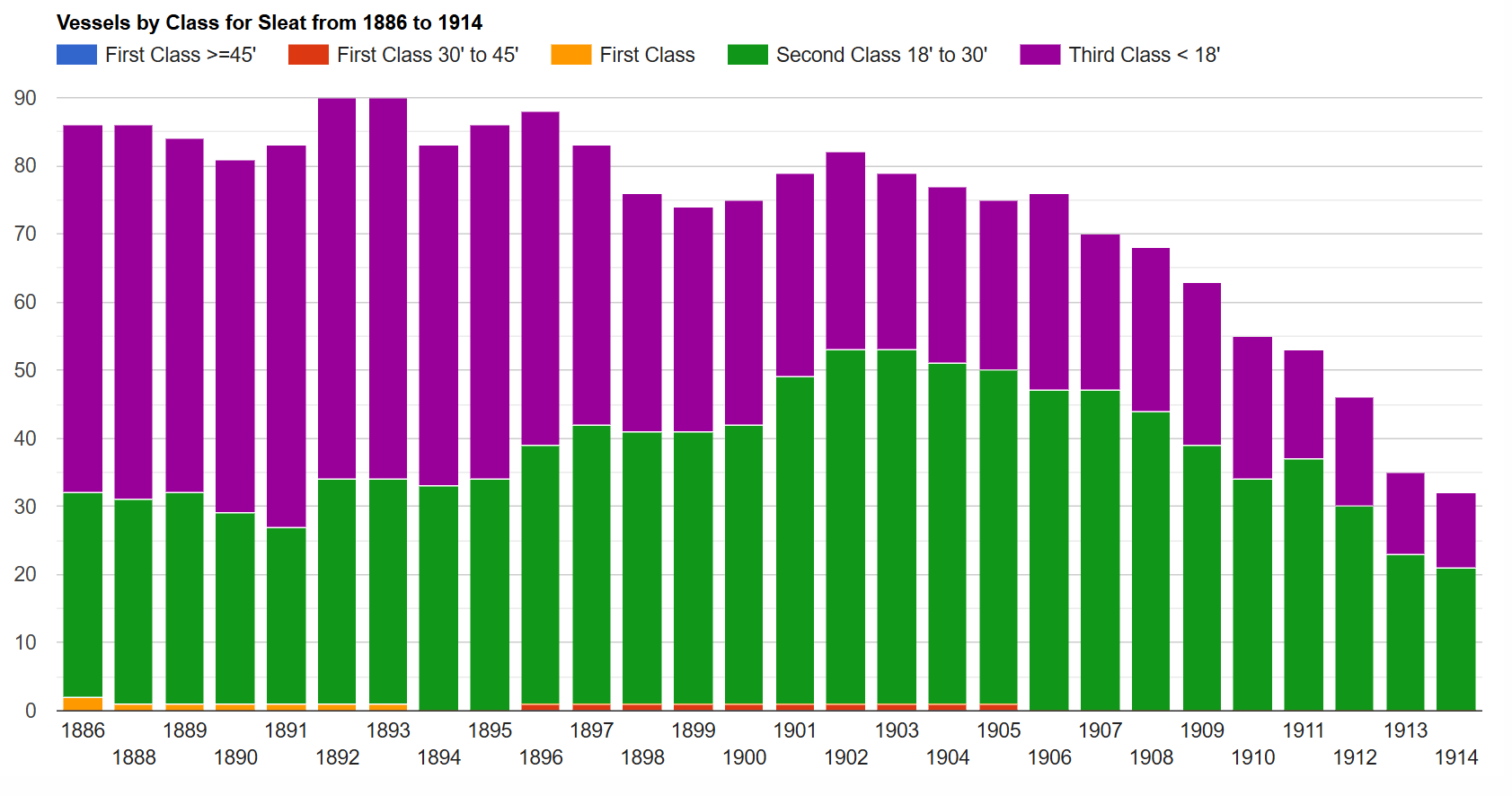
Vessels by class

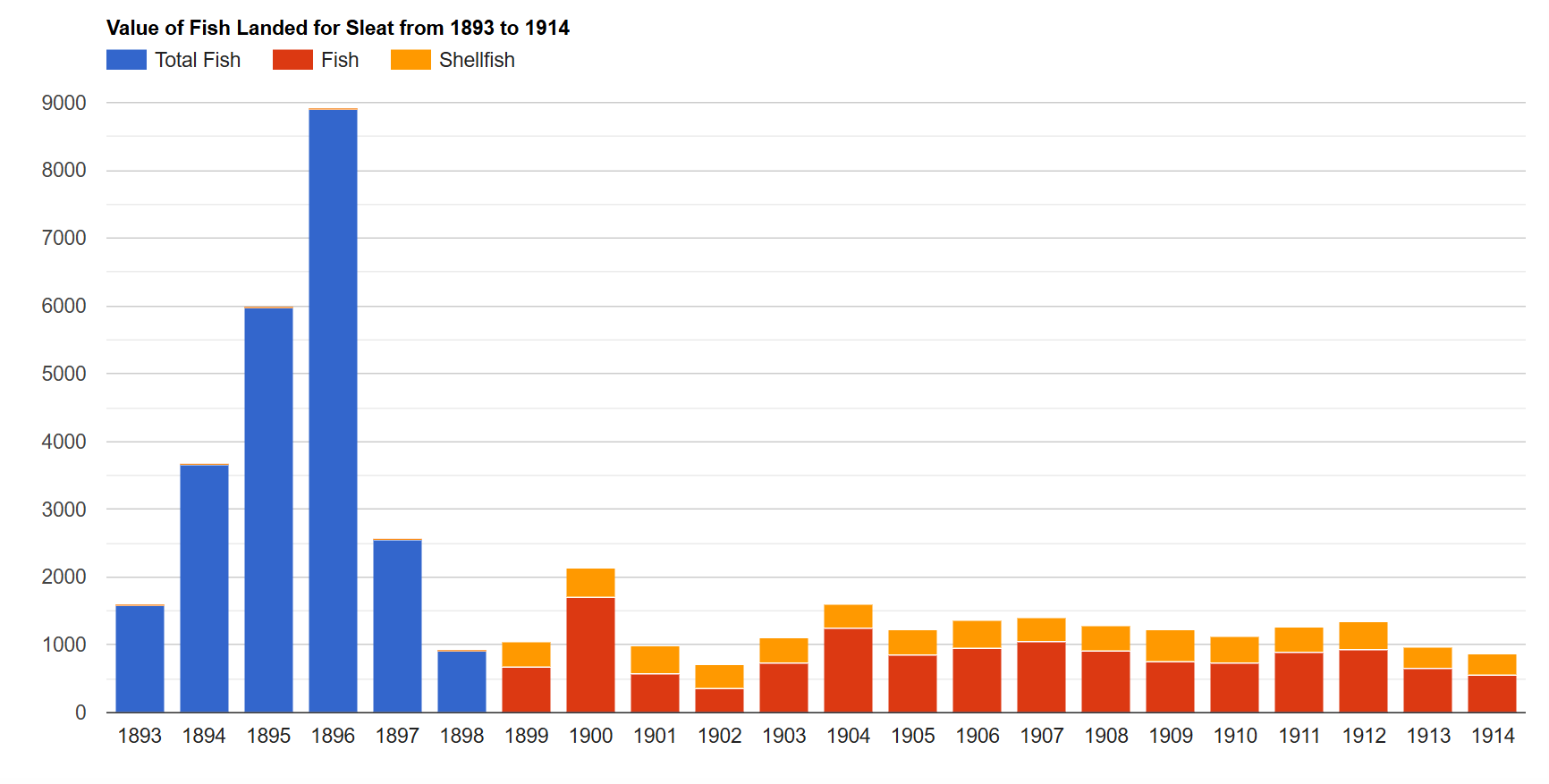
Value (£) of fish landed

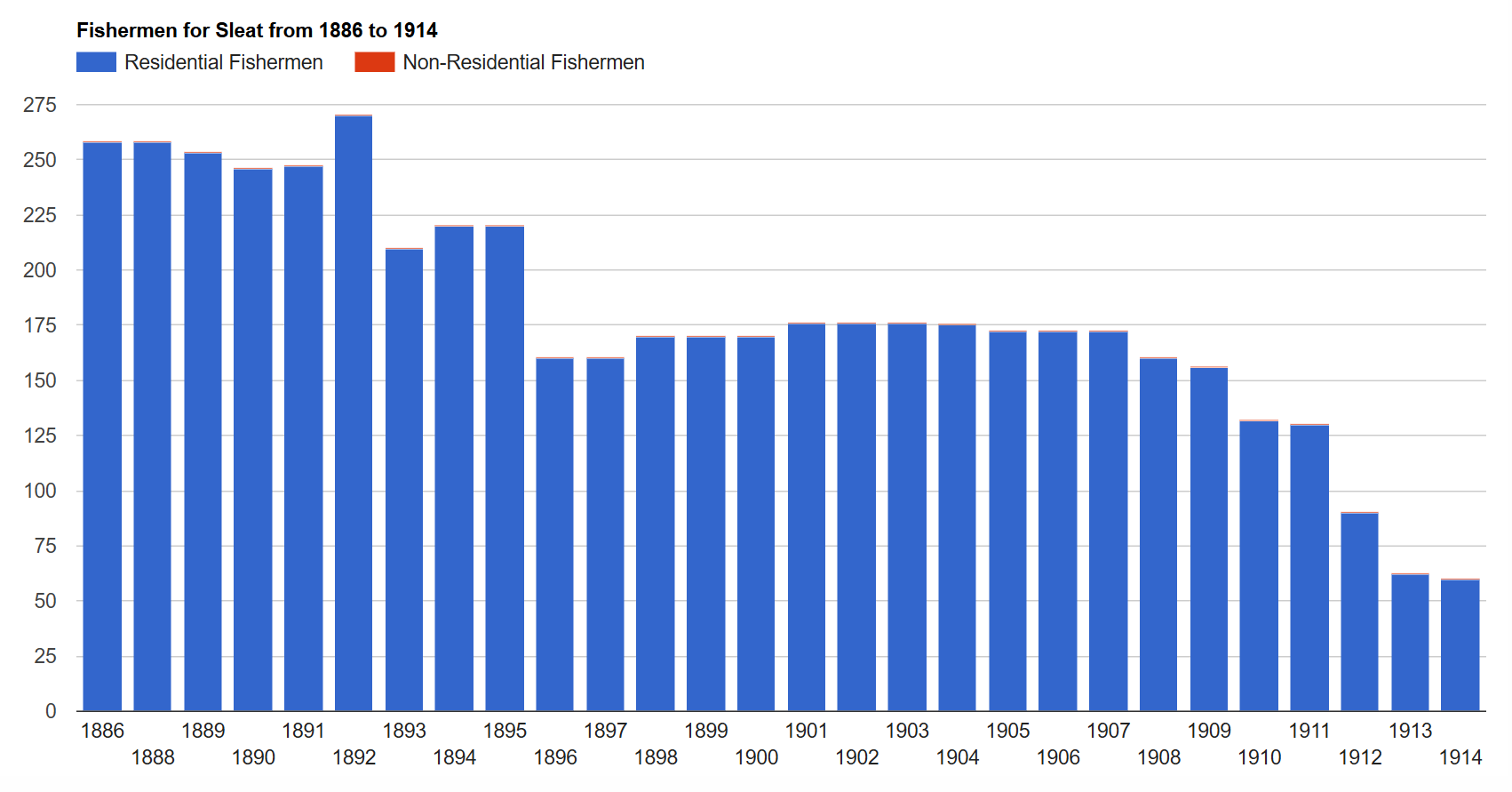
Fishermen

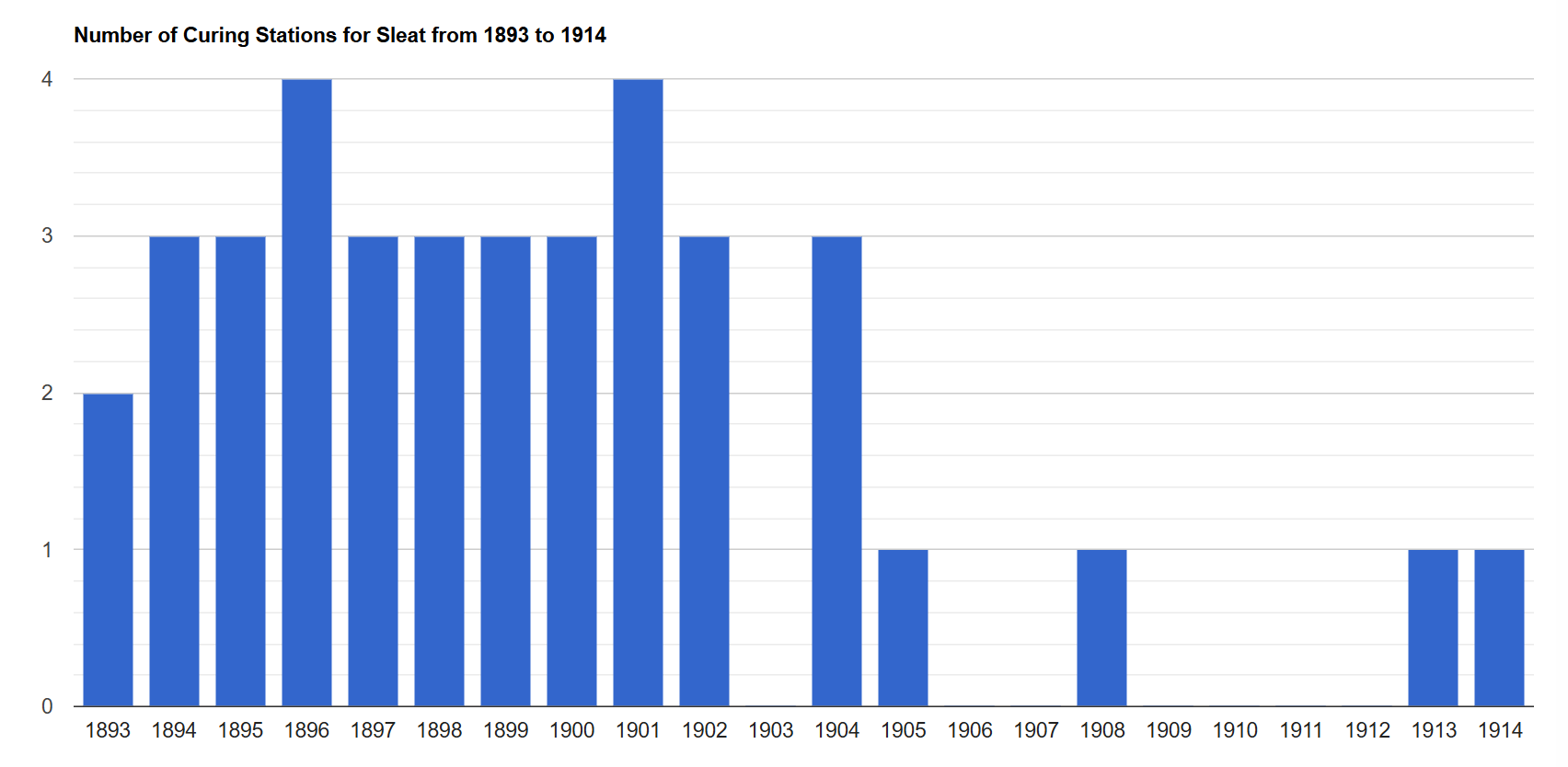
Number of curing stations

=== Communities ===
Sleat is a traditional parish that has several communities and two major landowners (the Clan Donald Lands Trust and Eilean Iarmain Estate). Most of the population lives on the southern side of the peninsula. The main settlements along the Sound of Sleat are, from north east to south west, Isleornsay, Teangue, Ferindonald, Kilmore, Armadale, Ardvasar and Aird of Sleat. On the northwest side are Tokavaig and Tarskavaig.

Sleat Community Trust (Scottish Gaelic: Urras Coimhearsnachd Shlèite), the local development trust, has purchased the Skye Ferry Filling Station at Armadale and in common with many communities is investigating the options for renewable energy production. It also owns Sleat Renewables Ltd., a timber production company. In October 2007 the Trust hosted the Highlands and Islands Community Energy Company annual conference.

== Transport and communications ==
The A851 road links Armadale to the rest of Skye. In the early 2000s the final section of a new double-track road through Sleat from Armadale Ferry to Broadford was finished. After later substantial upgrades by June 2019 it became a S2 road throughout. Most teenage school-children in Sleat travel along the A851 to attend Portree High School, where there is a hostel for those who live particularly far away.

Minor roads connect the two coasts of Sleat, and a minor road also extends beyond Armadale to Aird of Sleat. Beyond Aird a track leads 3.5 kilometres (2.2 mi) to the Point of Sleat Lighthouse.

A Caledonian MacBrayne car ferry connects Armadale to Mallaig on the mainland.

== Gaelic ==
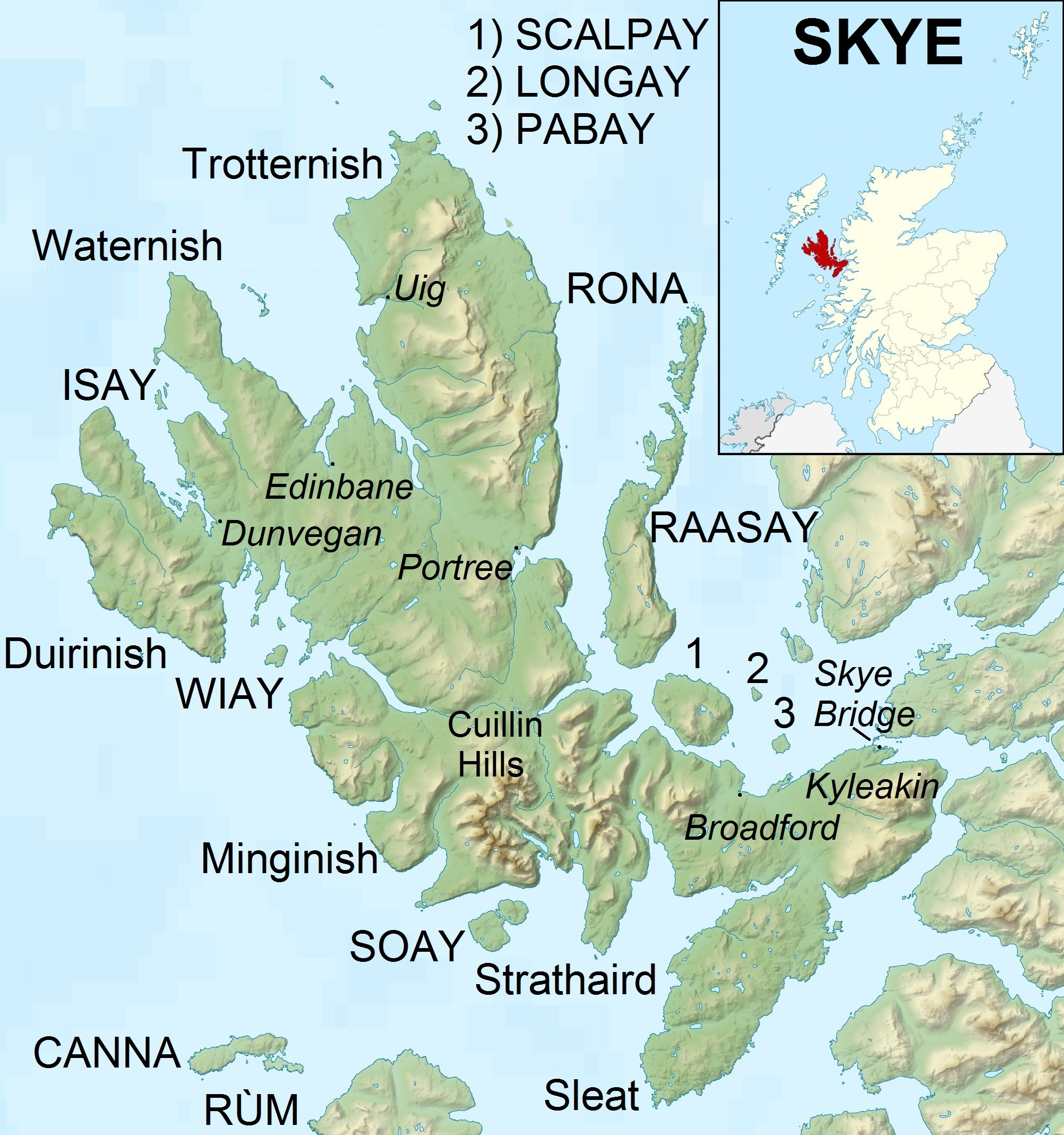
Map of Skye showing Sleat

After the Trotternish peninsula, the Sleat peninsula is the second strongest Gaelic-speaking area in Skye. In the 1901 census, 91% of the population was recorded as speaking Gaelic, with 10% recorded as Gaelic monolinguals. In the 2011 census, 39% of the population in Sleat were recorded as speaking Gaelic, with the highest percentage of Gaelic speakers in Tarskavaig and Achnacloich (51%), and the lowest in Armadale (27%). The local primary school, Bun-sgoil Shlèite, is a designated Gaelic-medium school. There was some local and national controversy in 2006 about the decision to change the status of the school from an English school with a Gaelic medium unit to a Gaelic school but in the end the Highland Council opted for a compromise solution, designating the school as an all-Gaelic school but with an English-medium unit. Sleat is home to Scotland's only Gaelic-medium college, Sabhal Mòr Ostaig, which provides university-level education in a number of subjects in Gaelic, and is the largest employer in the area. The Gaelic feature-length film, Seachd: The Inaccessible Pinnacle, was largely filmed in Sleat and produced by Christopher Young, a Sleat resident and partial Gaelic speaker.
