= Sabhal Mòr Ostaig =

Scottish Gaelic college on the Isle of Skye, Scotland

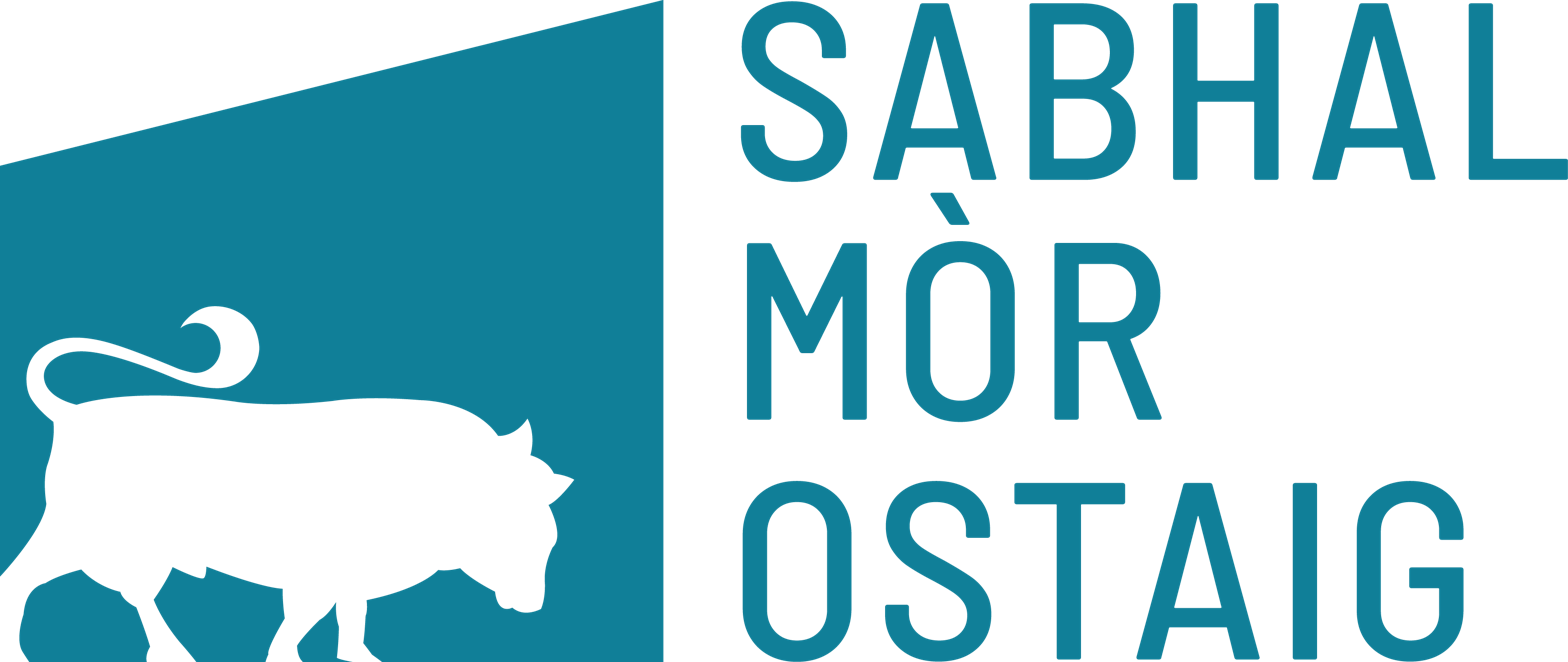
- Type: College
- Established: 1973
- Affiliations: University of the Highlands and Islands
- Principal: Gillian Munro
- Location: Sleat, Isle of Skye, Inner Hebrides, Scotland; 57.087°N 5.872°W
- Medium: Scottish Gaelic and English
- Website: www.smo.uhi.ac.uk

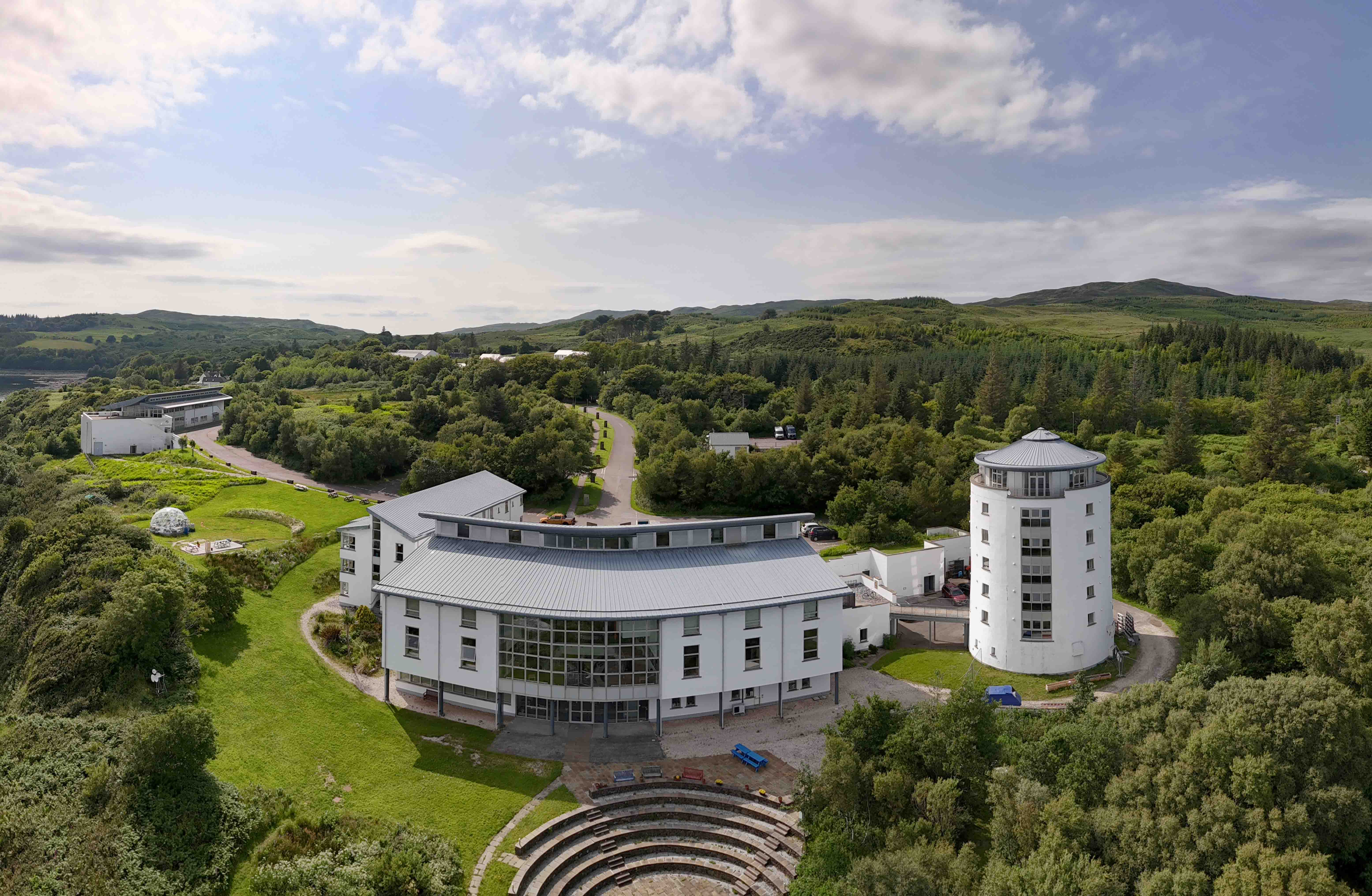
Àrainn Chaluim Chille, one of the two campuses that make up the college

Sabhal Mòr Ostaig ([ˌs̪ɔɫ̪ ˌmoɾ ˈɔs̪t̪ɪkʲ]; lit. 'Great Barn of Ostaig') is a public higher education college situated in the Sleat peninsula in the south of the Isle of Skye, Scotland with an associate campus at Bowmore on the island of Islay. Sabhal Mòr is an independent Academic Partner in the federal University of the Highlands and Islands. Its sole medium of instruction on degree courses is Scottish Gaelic.

Since its foundation in 1973 Sabhal Mòr Ostaig has played a crucial role in the linguistic and cultural renaissance of Gaelic in Scotland. The college enjoys an international reputation for the study of the history and literature of the Gàidhealtachd, past and present; for research into political, educational, and community aspects of minority language maintenance and revitalisation; and for its engagement with Gaelic creative arts, as well as with broadcast and online media.

Sabhal Mòr's research base has been further strengthened to take in sociolinguistics, through the Soillse initiative; corpus planning and historical lexicography, through the Stòrdata Nàiseanta na Gàidhlig/Gaelic Terminology Database and the Faclair na Gàidhlig/Dictionary of Scottish Gaelic projects; and toponomy, through the Ainmean-Àite na h-Alba/Gaelic Place-Names of Scotland advisory partnership, all based at the college. Research capacity is underpinned by the Sabhal Mòr Ostaig Library with its internationally important collections of material related to Gaelic and to the Highlands, and further complemented by the proximity of two major Highland archives: those of MacDonald of Sleat in the Museum of the Isles by Armadale Castle, and the MacLeod papers in Dunvegan Castle. Through academic collaboration and student exchanges, the college maintains links with partner institutions in Scotland, Ireland, Wales, and Nova Scotia.

With residencies for writers, artists, musicians, and dramatists; its degree courses in media and traditional music; its hosting of the national folklore digitisation project Tobar an Dualchais/Kist o Riches; and Fàs, its £8-million centre for creative industries, Sabhal Mòr fulfils an important cultural remit both in the Highlands and in Scotland more generally.

== History ==
=== Beginnings ===
In early 1972 Iain Noble, financier, merchant banker, and Gaelic activist, bought the northern portion of the Sleat estate, in the south of the Isle of Skye, from the then owner, Godfrey Macdonald, 8th Baron Macdonald of Sleat. Noble's vision for his new Eilean Iarmain estate was inspired by a visit he had made to the Faroe Islands in the late 1960s. There he had been impressed by how the local linguistic and cultural renaissance had helped to create what was at the time a correspondingly dynamic economic and creative revival:

When I asked the Faroese, I was amazed when they all replied that things began to happen when they decided to be Faroese and stop being Danish. This sparked the whole thing off. It gave them a sort of self-respect… I am convinced that through the revival of the language there came a pride in identity and all else followed. We mustn’t be frightened of being a small community. Instead we must create our own internal binding factors. People here have never believed that things are possible. But there is virtually nothing that could not be achieved in the Highlands.

Noble set about putting his ideals into practice. Gaelic speakers were recruited and employed in running new fishing and textile enterprises; a bar was set up beside the estate headquarters as a Gaelic-oriented social and cultural focus for the district; and he was soon involved in a series of wrangles with Inverness County Council over bilingual Gaelic roadsigns on his land. Noble was also inspired by the idea of renovating a semi-derelict farmhouse steading at Ostaig as a Gaelic cultural centre. Plans at first focused around the establishment of a Gaelic library, quickly growing through donations to become the largest public collection of Gaelic-related material in the Hebrides. In Noble's words, however:

a library by itself is like mustard without beef. It would have to be open to the public and should become a centre for students. Teachers and an academic ambience were the logical extensions of the new theme.

=== Creation ===
Sabhal Mòr Ostaig was established as a charitable trust in 1973, "as an educational institute, with a special emphasis on Gaelic educational functions", with a longer-term vision of establishing a Gaelic-medium college and research centre offering vocational further education, as well as opportunities for Gaelic learners to develop their fluency. Four urrasairean or trustees were appointed: Iain Noble, poet Sorley Maclean, Donald Ruaraidh Macdonald of Portree High School, and Gordon Barr, then a lecturer in biochemistry at the University of Dundee. Barr was to take a year's sabbatical, from June 1973 to September 1974, as the college's first fear-stiùiridh or director. A two-week summer course for Gaelic learners, attended by 22 students from Scotland, Britain, and further afield, was held in September 1973 in association with An Comunn Gàidhealach. Other activities included a lecture series, a Gaelic playgroup, night classes for Gaelic learners, and events for Gaelic-speaking schoolchildren. The Scottish Arts Council sponsored a Gaelic writer-in-residence, Catrìona Montgomery from Roag near Dunvegan. In November 1974 the charitable Calouste Gulbenkian Foundation offered Sabhal Mòr a three-year grant towards the cost of a full-time director. Farquhar MacLennan, a teacher from Raasay accepted the post the following spring. During the early years of the college's existence the trustees’ energy was directed towards fundraising, improving the dilapidated Ostaig steading, expanding summer courses in Gaelic and music, developing links with equivalent institutions in Ireland, Wales, and Canada, and hosting an annual conference.

In July 1978 the trustees of the college established a committee to examine the possibilities of delivering two-year full-time diploma courses through Gaelic. Two years later the committee recommended the establishment of practically oriented business and administration courses focusing upon the situation in the Highlands, but employing comparisons with similar regions. Following a fundraising drive to pay for the necessary building improvements, the first two-year HND diploma course, in Business and Gàidhealtachd Studies, began in 1983 under the new college principal, Seán Ó Drisceoil, appointed on a three-year secondment from Údarás na Gaeltachta in Ireland. Seven students, all native speakers from the Western Isles, comprised the first intake. Despite continuing financial problems, the college expanded its programme to take in two new HNDs: Business and Information Studies in 1987, and Business and Secretarial Studies, subsequently Business Studies with Office Technology, in 1988.

=== 1980s and 90s ===
During the 1980s the full-time student body at Sabhal Mòr numbered on average ten a year. Prospects for future development, however, remained restricted as long as the college focused solely on recruiting business students with fluent Gaelic. Opportunities for significant expansion arose at the end of the decade with the establishment of Comataidh Telebhisein Gàidhlig, endowed by the government with an annual grant of £9.5 million. With its business focus, and existing expertise in ICT, Sabhal Mòr was well placed to take advantage of the demand for a major increase in Gaelic-speaking personnel in the Scottish media. Under its new director Norman Gillies, the college was able to secure funding from the Scottish Office, Highlands and Islands Enterprise, Scottish Television, and Grampian Television for the construction of a £1.4 million accommodation block, Àrainn Ostaig (Ostaig Campus), with 36 student bedrooms, teaching and administration spaces, dining facilities, and a television studio. Àrainn Ostaig opened in the autumn of 1993. The same year, the college launched what would prove a remarkably popular postgraduate diploma in Gaelic Broadcasting.

The early 1990s saw a series of significant developments at Sabhal Mòr, including the establishment in 1992 of the Lèirsinn Research Centre and the Cànan creative agency. The growth of college accommodation allowed a massive increase in summer courses and short courses. The introduction in 1994 of a new HNC in Gaelic and Communications, a diploma designed to boost the supply of teachers to the growing number of Gaelic medium units in primary schools across the country, further underlined the shift in the college's position in response to the increasing need for qualified Gaelic speakers in the media and education throughout Scotland. During the rest of the decade there would be a major expansion of the college campus and a sizeable growth in student numbers. The latter was the consequence of two new one-year HNC diplomas established in 1997 – the innovative language immersion Cùrsa Comais intended to enable Gaelic learners to attain comprehension and fluency within a year, and the HNC in Gaelic Performing Arts designed to meet an apparent need for more Gaelic television actors in the future – and the introduction of university-level BA courses the following year. The most significant influence on the college's long-term strategic thinking during the 1990s was the prospect of participating as a partner college in the recently proposed University of the Highlands and Islands (UHI) network, and thus being able to offer full-time degree courses. The involvement of Sabhal Mòr Ostaig from 1995 onwards was crucial for the credibility of the wider UHI project. Its Gaelic identity helped to lend the scheme a much needed cultural distinctiveness rooted in the region. In a more concrete sense, the surprising ‘conversion’ of the then Scottish Secretary Michael Forsyth to the merit of the UHI scheme in October 1995 was primarily due to a recent visit to Sabhal Mòr during which he had been given a demonstration of the efficacy of new ISDN communications technologies in linking widely dispersed colleges into a single university network. Forsyth's remarkable volte-face gave the UHI proposal the vital government support required to make a plausible submission to the lottery-funded Millennium Commission.

The project bid was funded in full: an award of £33.35 million allowed construction of new college buildings throughout the network, in preparation for envisaged university status. Among these buildings was the £6 million second campus at Sabhal Mòr, Àrainn Chaluim Chille (Columba Campus). The site, two hundred yards along the road from the original Ostaig site, occupied part of a 6 1/2-acre (2.6-hectare) site donated by Ellice MacDonald, chairman of Clan Donald Trust, that had previously been earmarked as the site for a new township, Bail’ Ùr Ostaig, the subject of an unsuccessful £15.75 million bid by Sabhal Mòr itself to the Millennium Commission. In September 1998 Àrainn Chaluim Chille, with teaching facilities, library, dining room, lecture/sports/concert hall, and 31 student bedrooms, was completed; the following year saw the opening of the iconic tower Lòchran an Dòmhnallaich (the MacDonald Beacon), containing 31 further bedrooms and partly funded from a £900,000 end-of-year surplus wrangled from the Scottish Office by the then Minister for Industry, Education and Gaelic, Brian Wilson.

In 1997 the college commenced its first BA courses, Cànan is Cultar na Gàidhlig (Gaelic Language and Culture), and Gàidhlig agus Iomall a’ Chuain Siar (Gaelic and the Atlantic Rim), later Gàidhlig is Leasachadh (Gaelic and Development). These were upgraded into Honours courses in 2002, when a further BA course, Gàidhlig agus na Meadhanan (Gaelic and Media Studies), was introduced. Another BA (Hons) course, Gàidhlig agus Ceòl Traidiseanta (Gaelic and Traditional Music), began in 2006, while the following year the teacher-training MA (Hons) course in Gàidhlig agus Foghlam (Gaelic and Education) began, in collaboration with the University of Aberdeen. These were complemented by highly successful distance learning language courses: from 2000, the award-winning Cùrsa Inntrigidh for beginners, and six years later, the Cùrsa Adhartais for advanced learners. The college also offers an innovative master's degree, the MSc in Cultar Dùthchasach agus Eachdraidh na Gàidhealtachd (Material Culture and Gàidhealtachd History), begun in 2005 as an MA in Cultar Dùthchasach agus an Àrainneachd (Material Culture and the Environment). Since the University of the Highlands and Islands project was granted university status and thus degree-granting powers in March 2011, the college has strengthened its research base through sponsorship of a growing number of PhD studentships.

=== 21st century ===
Sabhal Mòr Ostaig continues its expansion in the twenty-first century. Ionad Chaluim Chille Ìle, the college's associate campus in Islay, opened in 2002. The college was visited by Prince Charles, Duke of Rothesay in 2004; he expressed hope for the Gaelic language flourishing, stating "Scottish life is greatly enriched by the Gaelic dimension," and "If it flourishes here it sends out a message of inspiration and optimism." In 2008 the £8 million new centre for creative and cultural industries, Ionad Fàs, incorporating a television studio, offices, workshop and exhibition spaces, and Gaelic-medium childcare facilities, was finished. In 2013 the £6.7 million first phase of the Kilbeg Village scheme began, a long-term development that will result in new administration and research facilities, a conference and training centre, new college and community sports and recreation provision, a hotel, and up to 75 new houses being built in the space between the two campuses.

== Campus ==
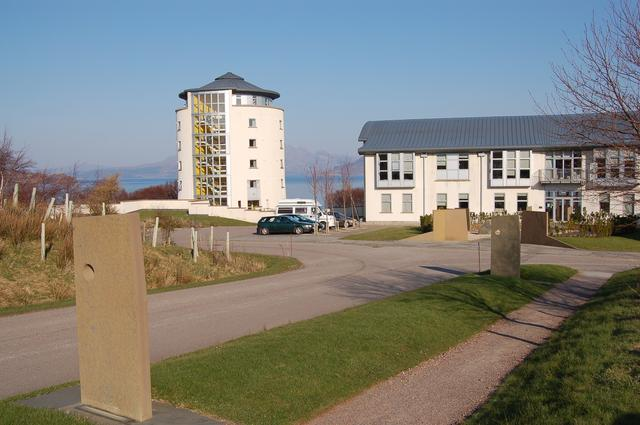
A view of Àrainn Chaluim Chille, one of the two campuses that make up the college

At present Sabhal Mòr Ostaig occupies two linked campuses, Àrainn Ostaig and Àrainn Chaluim Chille.

Àrainn Ostaig, situated some 2 miles (3 kilometres) north-east of the main ferry terminal at Armadale, consists of two quadrangles. The renovated Ostaig steading was originally built on a U-plan in the late 1820s by Major Allan MacDonald of Belfinlay, who had the lease of Ostaig farm at the time, then subsequently extended on the south side. The adjoining modern blocks of student accommodation, lecture facilities, and offices, designed by Donald Mackillop Assocs, were opened in autumn 1993. The original buildings contain the student common room and the Tàlla Mòr or Great Hall, used for cèilidhs and smaller concerts, while the newer hosts the Café Ostaig.

Àrainn Chaluim Chille, 300 yards to the east of Àrainn Ostaig, consists of a main building (1998) incorporating teaching facilities, the college library and dining room, the lecture/sports/concert hall Talla Dhonaidh Chaimbeul, and student accommodation, and the broch-like tower Lòchran an Dòmhnallaich (1999), containing additional student and guest bedrooms and crowned by a glazed drum and lantern viewing platform. Designed by George Mulvagh of Gillespie Architects, the buildings were awarded a Regeneration of Scotland architectural award by the Royal Incorporation of Architects in Scotland. Adjoining them is the later Ionad Fàs (2008), the centre for creative and cultural industries, again designed by Gillespie Architects.

The college's associate campus Ionad Chaluim Chille Ìle, situated beside Bowmore on the island of Islay and incorporating a library and lecture facilities, was opened in 2002.

== Organisation ==
Sabhal Mòr Ostaig is an independent charitable company and an Academic Partner of the University of the Highlands and Islands. The college itself is governed by a Board of Directors responsible for strategy and policy development. Its Cathraichean (Chairs) since 2007 have been:

- 2007–2016 Roddy John MacLeod, now Lord Minginish
- 2016–2017 Aideen O’Malley, an Irish academic living in Scotland
- 2017–2023 Angus G MacLeod, an Inverness-based solicitor
- 2023–date Angus MacInnes

A college management team supervises the three internal departments of Academic Provision, Arts and Development, and Finance and Planning. College staff are also involved in the governance of the University of the Highlands and Islands, and participate in relevant committees within the wider network partnership.

The following projects are associated with Sabhal Mòr Ostaig:

- Cànan: bilingual creative agency
- Faclair na Gàidhlig/Dictionary of Scottish Gaelic
- Ainmean-Àite na h-Alba/Gaelic Place-Names of Scotland
- Soillse: the national research network for the maintenance and revitalisation of Gaelic language and culture
- Stòrdata Nàiseanta na Gàidhlig/Gaelic Terminology Database
- Tobar an Dualchais – Kist o Riches: collaborative online folklore project

Sabhal Mòr Ostaig has a writer-in-residence, a musician-in-residence, artists in residence, and a drama artist-in-residence.

== Academic life ==
=== Courses ===
Sabhal Mòr Ostaig offers the following degrees and diplomas:

Distance Learning:

- Cùrsa Inntrigidh (Beginners’ Gaelic Course)
- Cùrsa Adhartais (Advanced Gaelic Course)
- Sgilean Sgrìobhaidh (Gaelic Writing Skills)
- Deasachadh agus Foillseachadh (Editing and Publishing)
- DipHE Gaelic and Related Studies
- BA (With or without Honours) Gàidhlig is Leasachadh (Gaelic and Development)
- BA (With or without Honours) Cànan is Cultar na Gàidhlig (Gaelic Language and Culture)
- CPD Diploma Leasachadh Coimhearsnachd (Community Development)
- CPD Diploma Leasachadh Cànain (Language Development)
- PGCert Scottish Culture and Heritage
- MA Learning and Teaching (Gaelic Arts)

Undergraduate:

- CertHE An Cùrsa Comais (Gaelic Competence Course)
- CertHE Gàidhlig is Conaltradh (Gaelic and Communication)
- PDA Diploma Na Meadhanan Gàidhlig (Gaelic Media)
- BA (Hons) Cànan is Cultar na Gàidhlig (Gaelic Language and Culture)
- BA (Hons) Gàidhlig is Leasachadh (Gaelic and Development)
- BA (Hons) Gàidhlig agus Ceòl Traidiseanta (Gaelic and Traditional Music)
- MA (Hons) Gàidhlig agus Foghlam (Gaelic and Education)

Postgraduate:

- MSc Cultar Dùthchasach agus Eachdraidh na Gàidhealtachd (Material Culture and Gàidhealtachd History)

In addition, research staff at the college are presently supervising PhD theses concerning Gaelic language, culture, history, and sociolinguistics.

Sabhal Mòr Ostaig also offers a growing number of short courses, well-established programmes in Gaelic language and music as well as more recent ones in history, culture, and crofting. Most are based at the main Skye campus, but the college runs a number of courses elsewhere in the country and abroad.

=== Library ===
Sabhal Mòr Ostaig Library is an internationally significant collection of material, antiquarian and contemporary, relating to Gaelic language, culture, and music, and Highland history. At present Special Collections number over 6,000 volumes, comprising six principal divisions:

- the Celtica Collection, acquired by Sir Robert Gordon of Letterfourie (1824–1908) and previously housed in Fort Augustus Abbey;
- the MacCormick Collection, donated by the pre-eminent Gaelic bookseller and collector Donald MacCormick;
- the collection of Sorley Maclean (1911–1996), Gaelic poet and scholar;
- the collection of Professor Robert A. Rankin (1915–2001), emeritus Professor of Mathematics at the University of Glasgow, and Gaelic scholar;
- the collection of Professor Roderick Cannon (1938–2015), emeritus Professor of Chemistry at the University of East Anglia, and distinguished historian of bagpipe music;
- the Sabhal Mòr Ostaig Collection itself, accumulated since the college's foundation.

The Library also holds a sizeable collection of historic 78-rpm recordings of Gaelic singers and musicians, donated from the archives of the BBC in Glasgow.

Sabhal Mòr Ostaig Library is a member of the Consortium of European Research Libraries, and the Ligue des Bibliothèques Européenes de Recherche.

=== College Principals and Directors ===
The following have been College Principals and Directors of Sabhal Mòr Ostaig:

- Gordon Barr (Principal 1973–1974)
- Farquhar MacLennan (Principal 1975–1978)
- Iain Taylor (Principal 1980–1982)
- Seán Ó Drisceoil (Principal 1983–1986)
- Colin MacLeod (Principal 1986–1987)
- Norman Gillies (Director 1987–2009)
- Boyd Robertson (Director 2009–2018)
- Gillian Munro (Director 2018–to date)

== Student life and culture ==
The college hosts regular concerts, plays, cèilidhs, dances, films, and gigs open to the wider local community, while local hotels and pubs offer weekly music sessions in a variety of styles. There are a number of local sports clubs, and a Club Coiseachd/Walking Club allows students the opportunity to enjoy the landscape of Skye and surrounding areas.

As well as organising social events, the student association Comann nan Oileanach is involved in a number of campaigns, strengthening links with students in other Associate Partners in the University of the Highlands and Islands, with Celtic Societies in other universities and with other smaller colleges across the country.

== See also ==
- List of further and higher education colleges in Scotland
- The Royal Cape Breton Gaelic College
- Sàr Ghaidheal Fellowships
