= List of places in Highland (council area) =

See the list of places in Scotland for places in other counties.

This article is a list of any town, village, hamlet or settlement, in the Highland council area of Scotland. The area encompassed by the Highland council is smaller than that encompassed by the Scottish Highlands. For the Scottish Gaelic equivalents of the place names in this list, see the appropriate section at List of Scottish Gaelic place names.

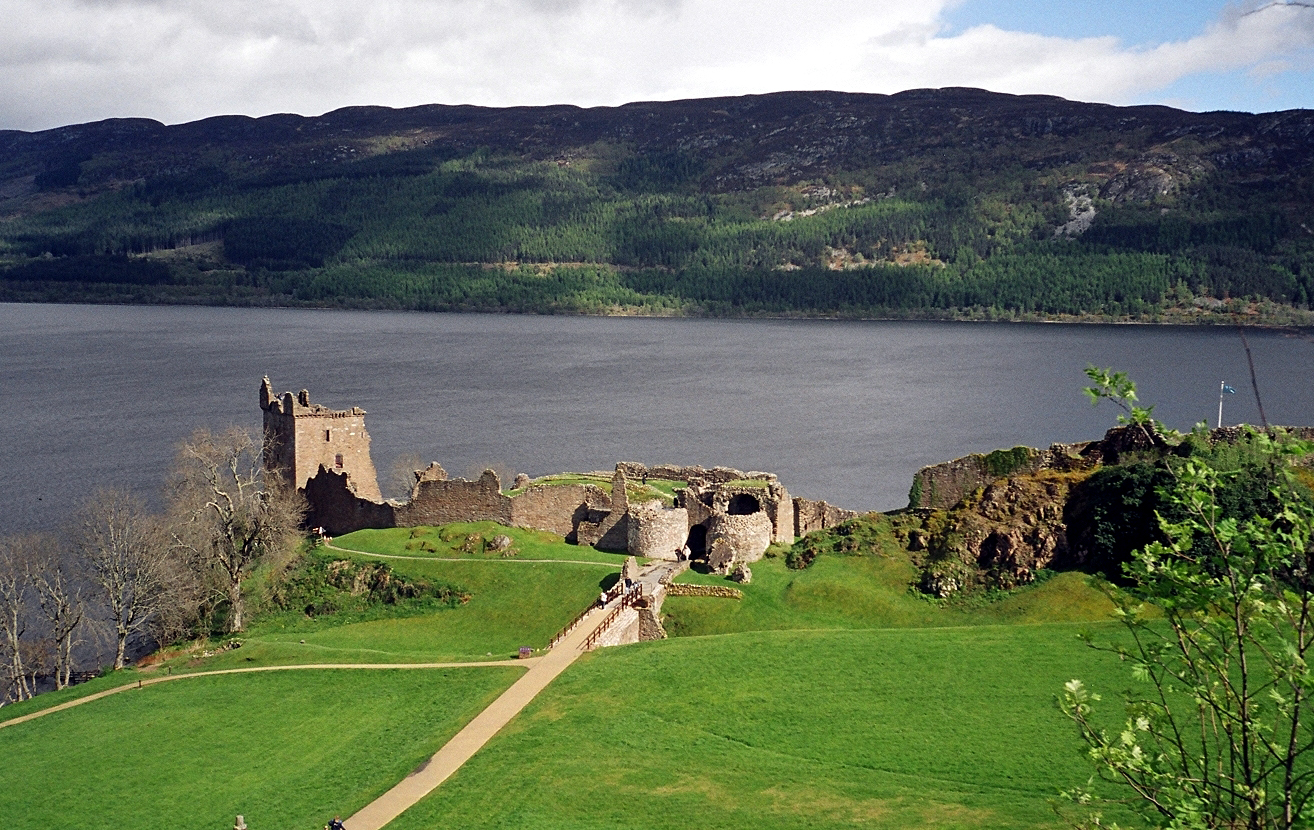
Urquhart Castle

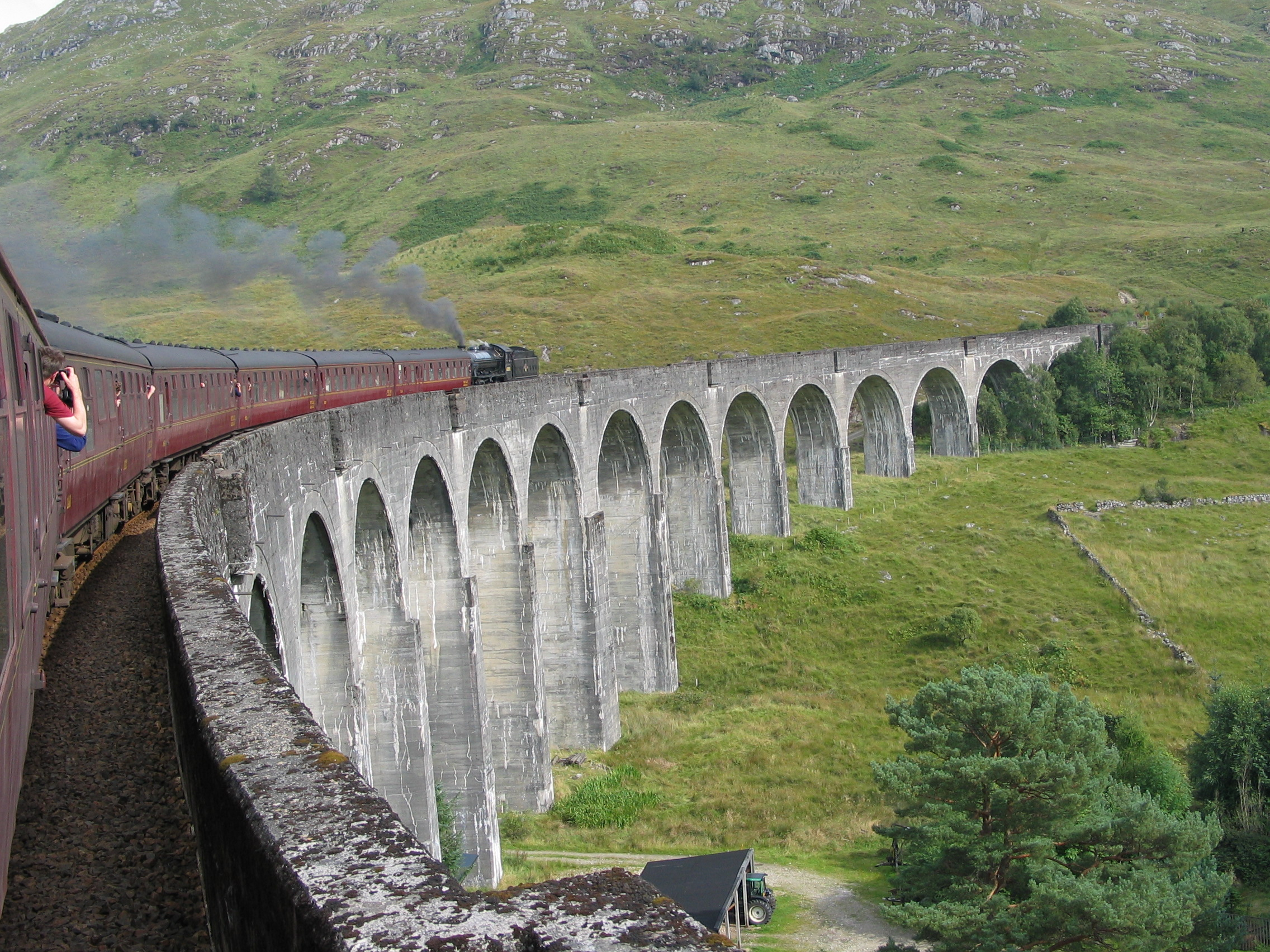
Glenfinnan Viaduct

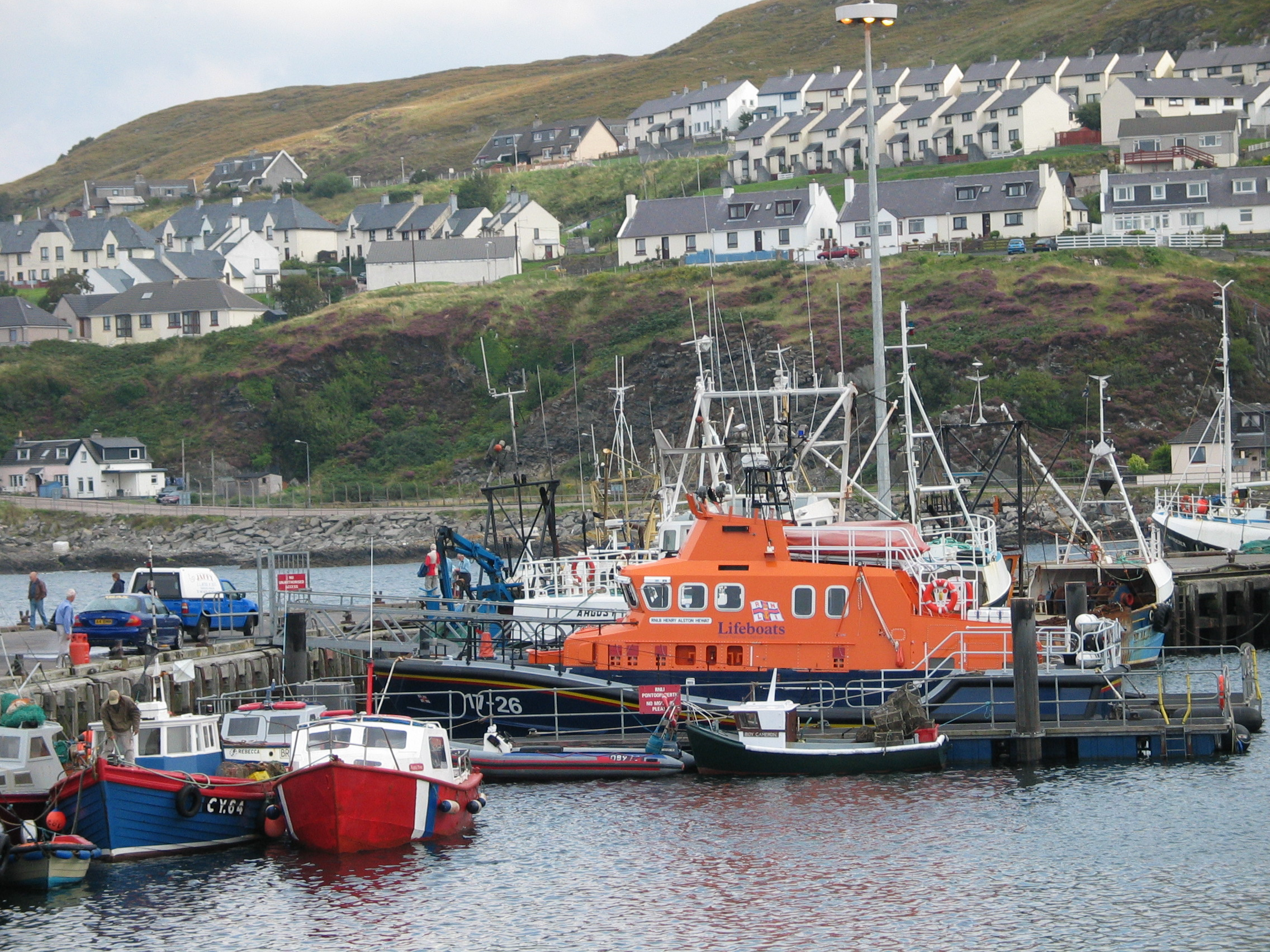
Mallaig

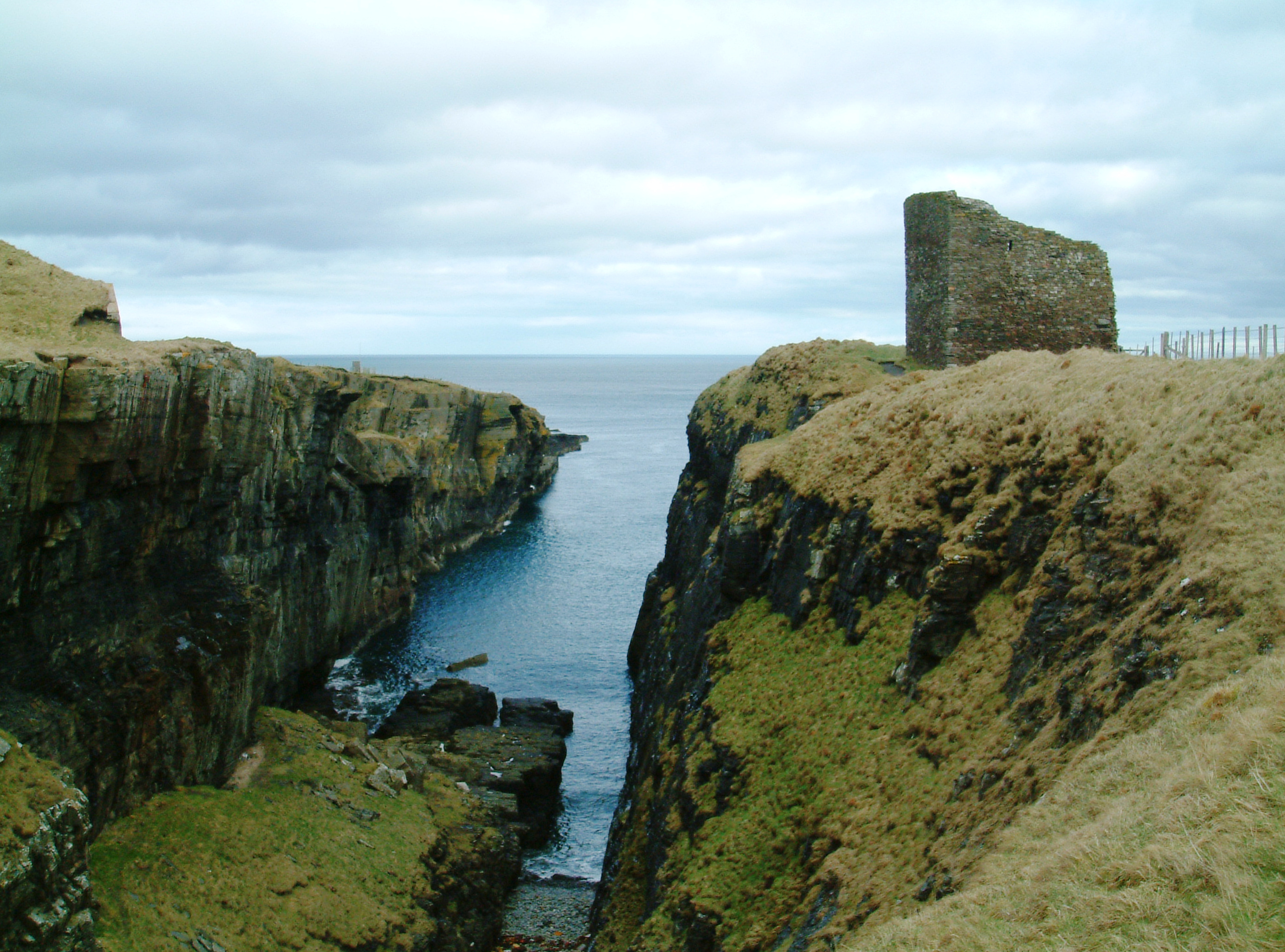
Wick, Old Castle

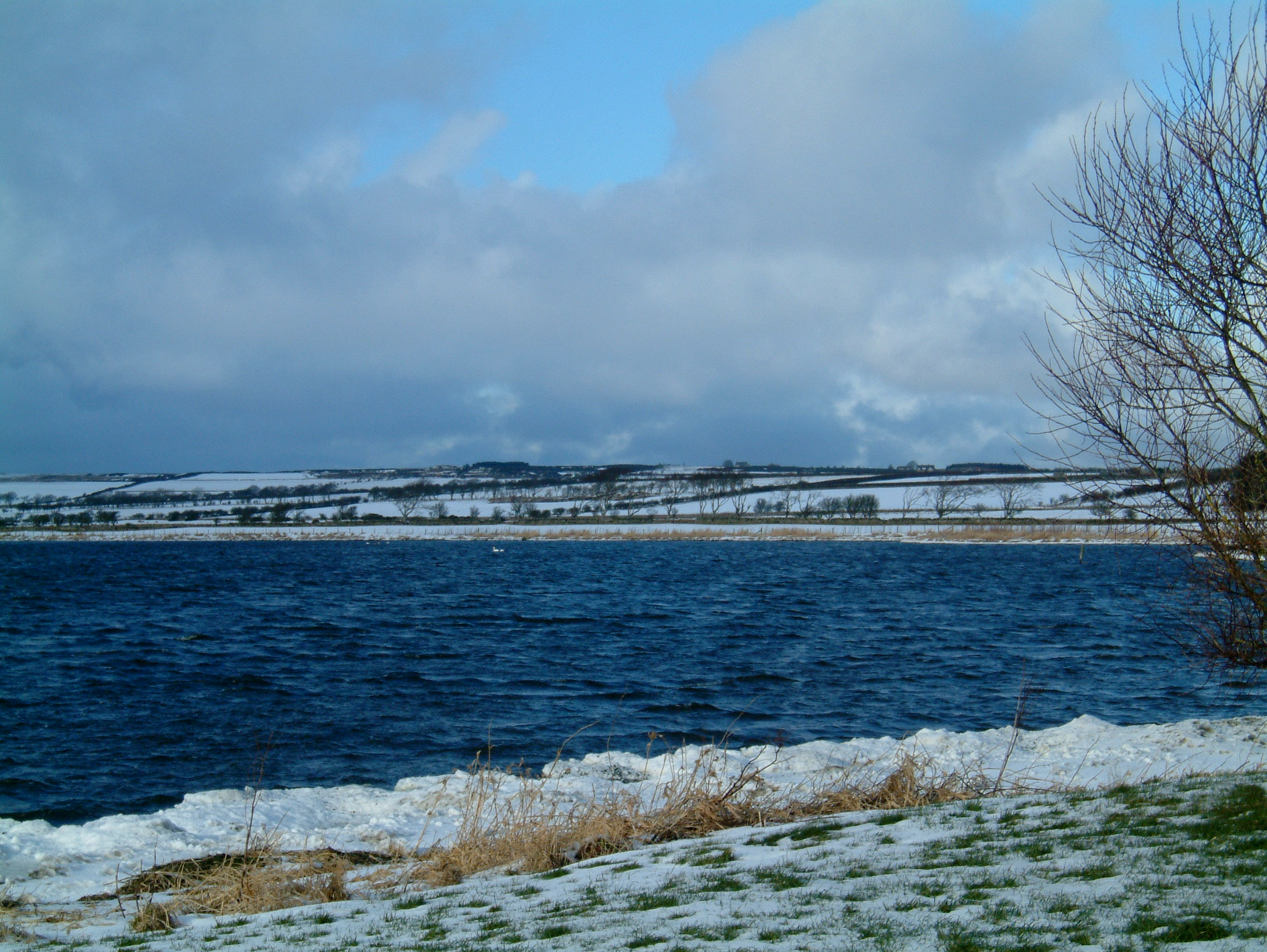
Loch Watten

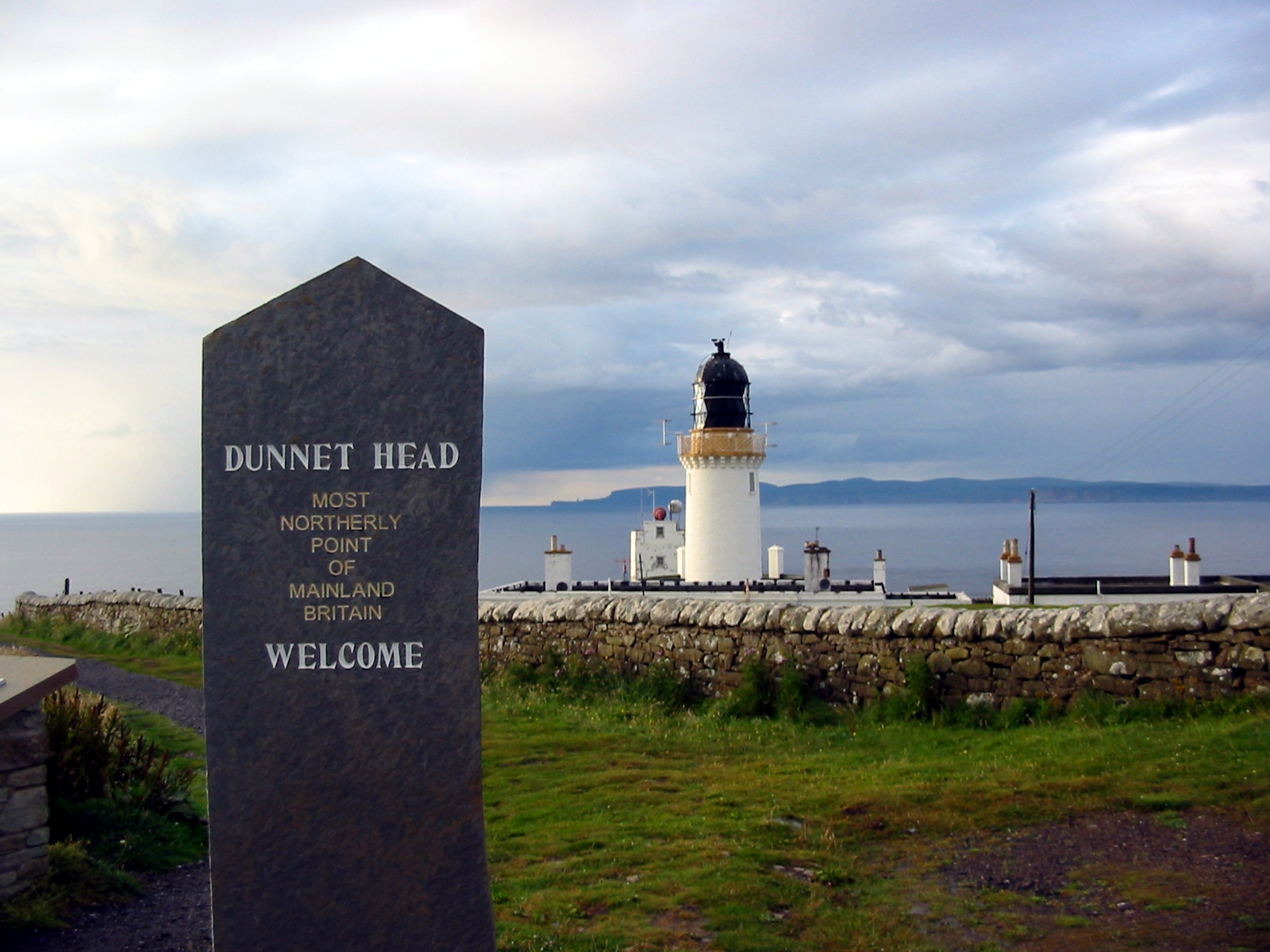
Dunnet Head

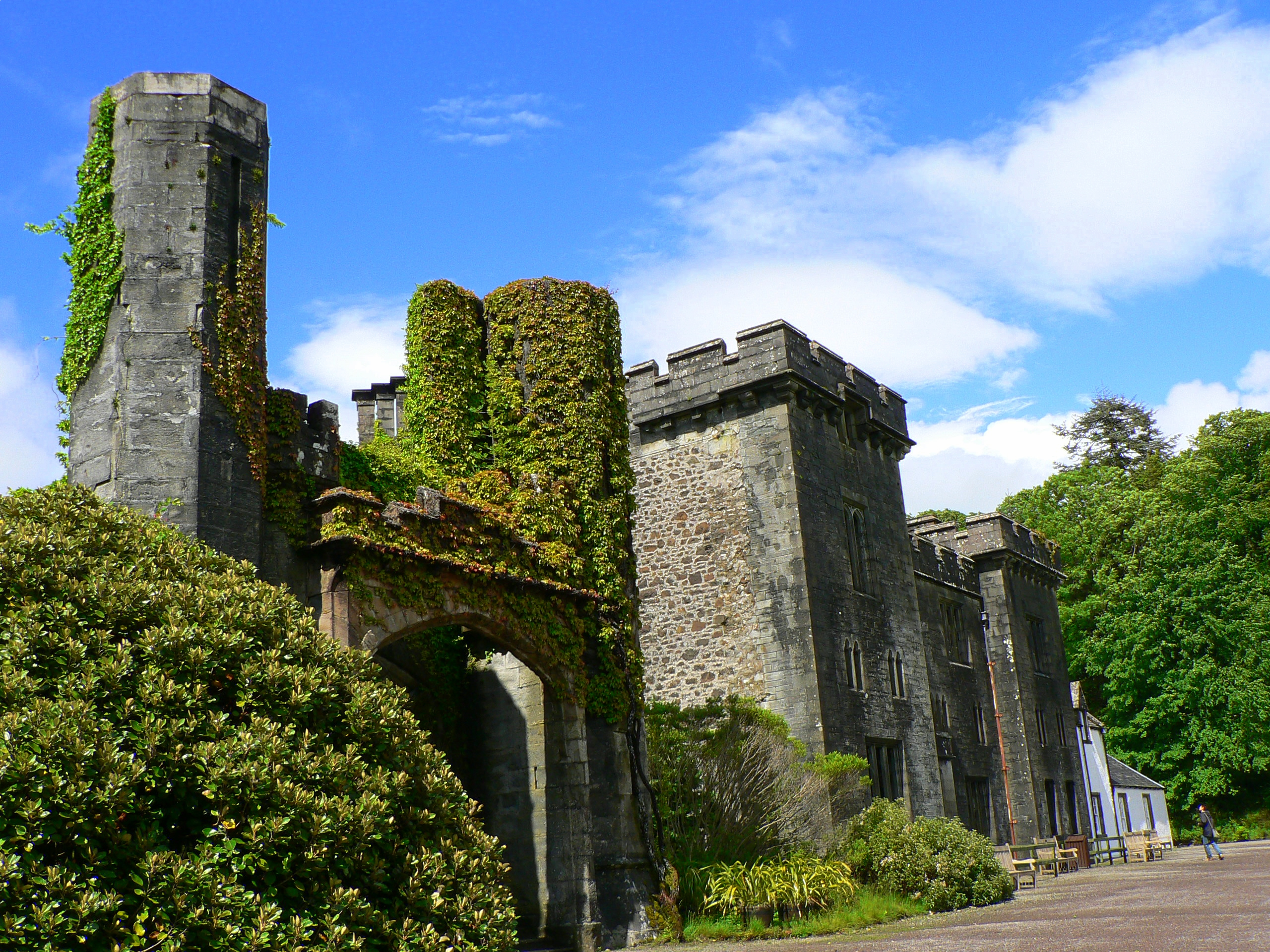
Armadale Castle

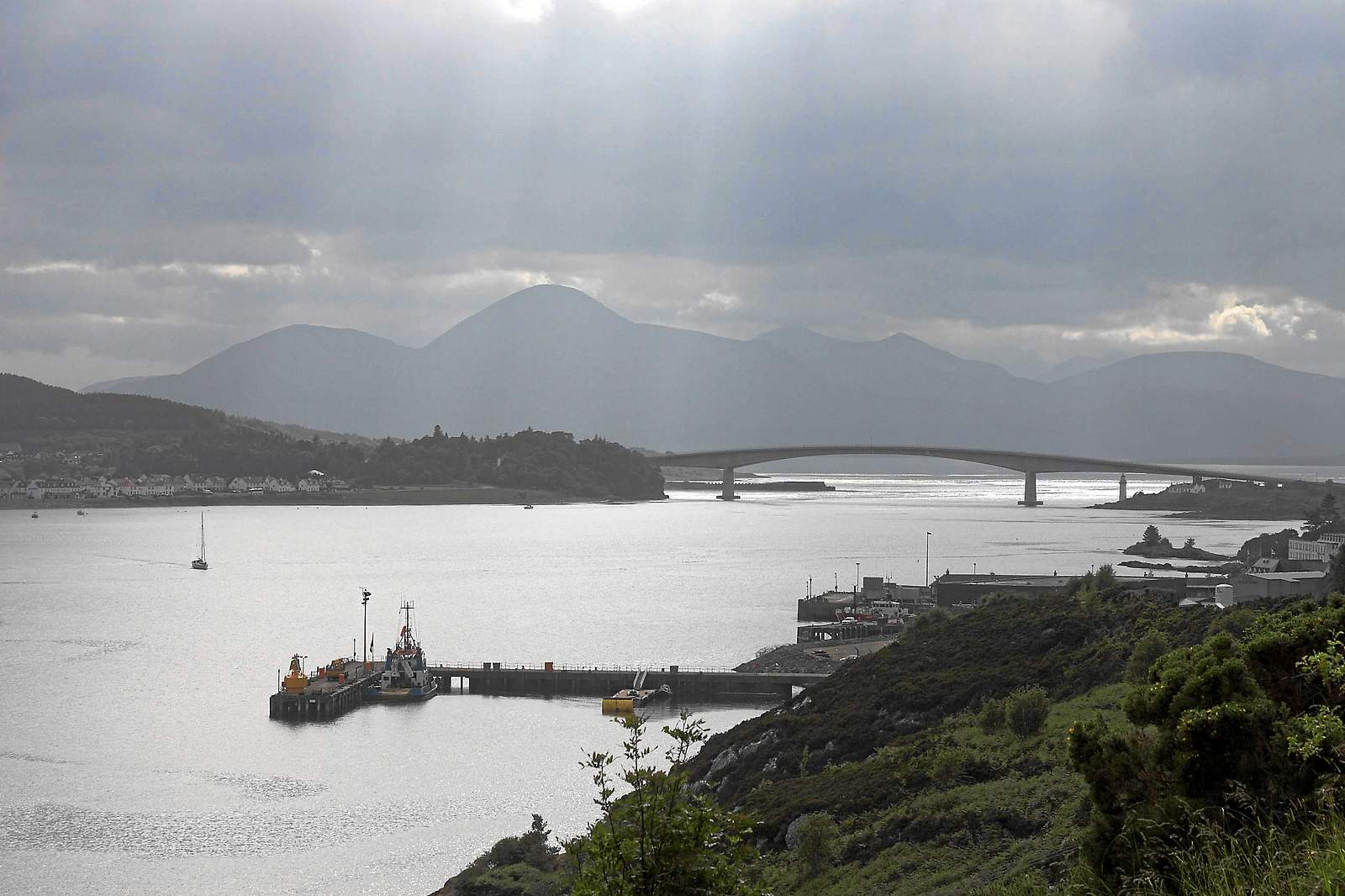
Kyle of Lochalsh

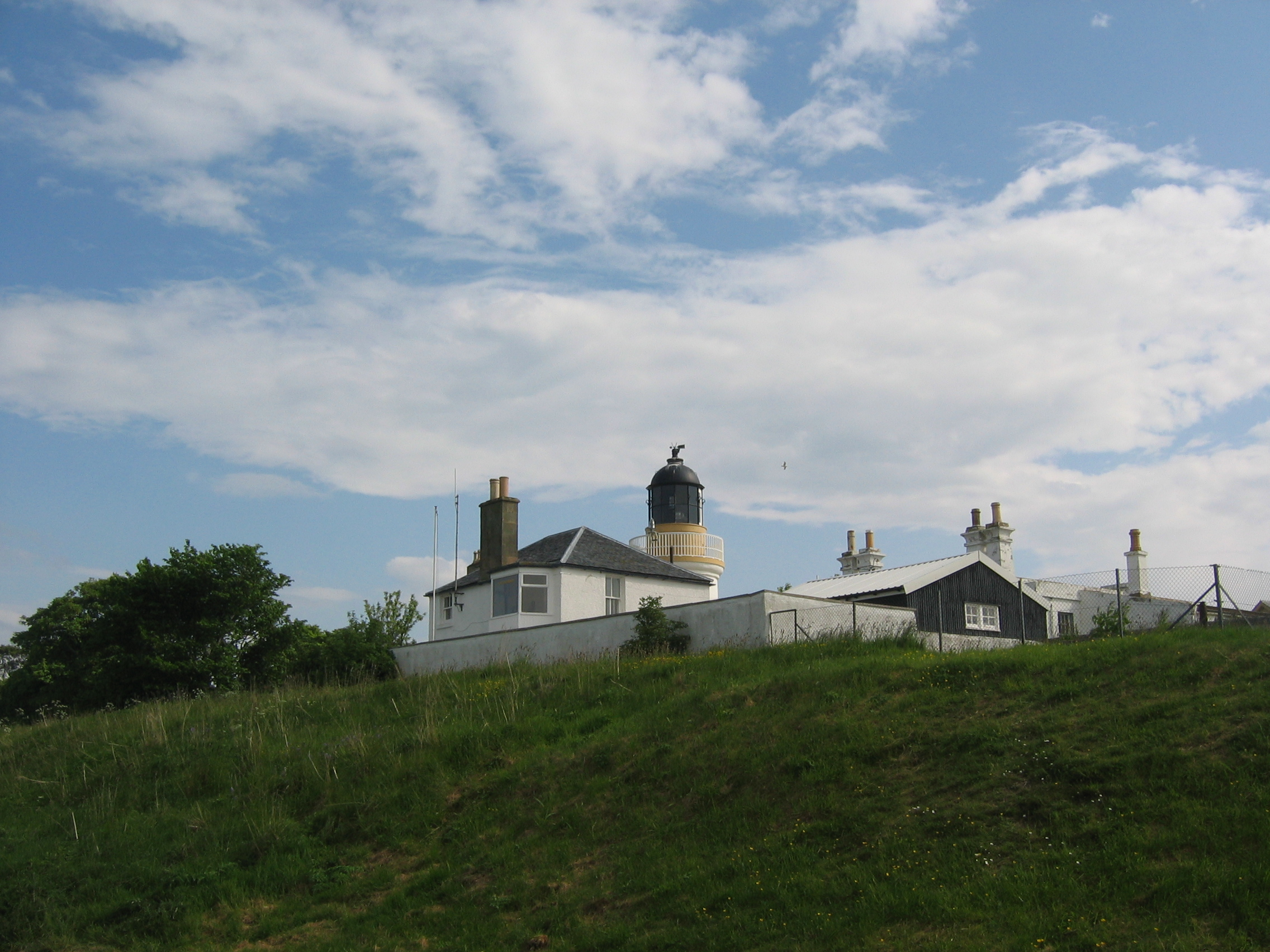
Lighthouse, Cromarty

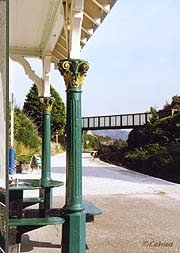
Plockton Station

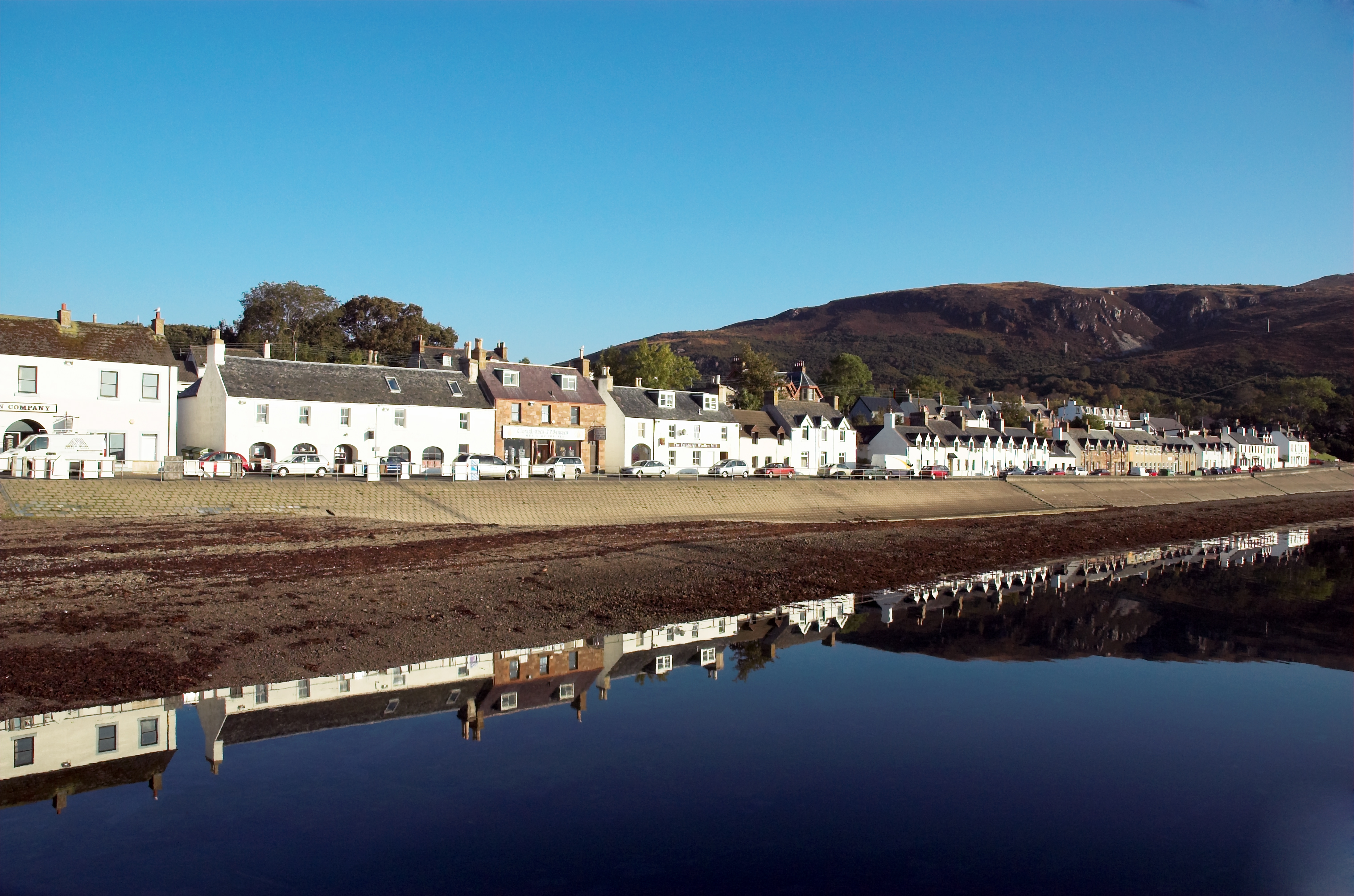
Ullapool

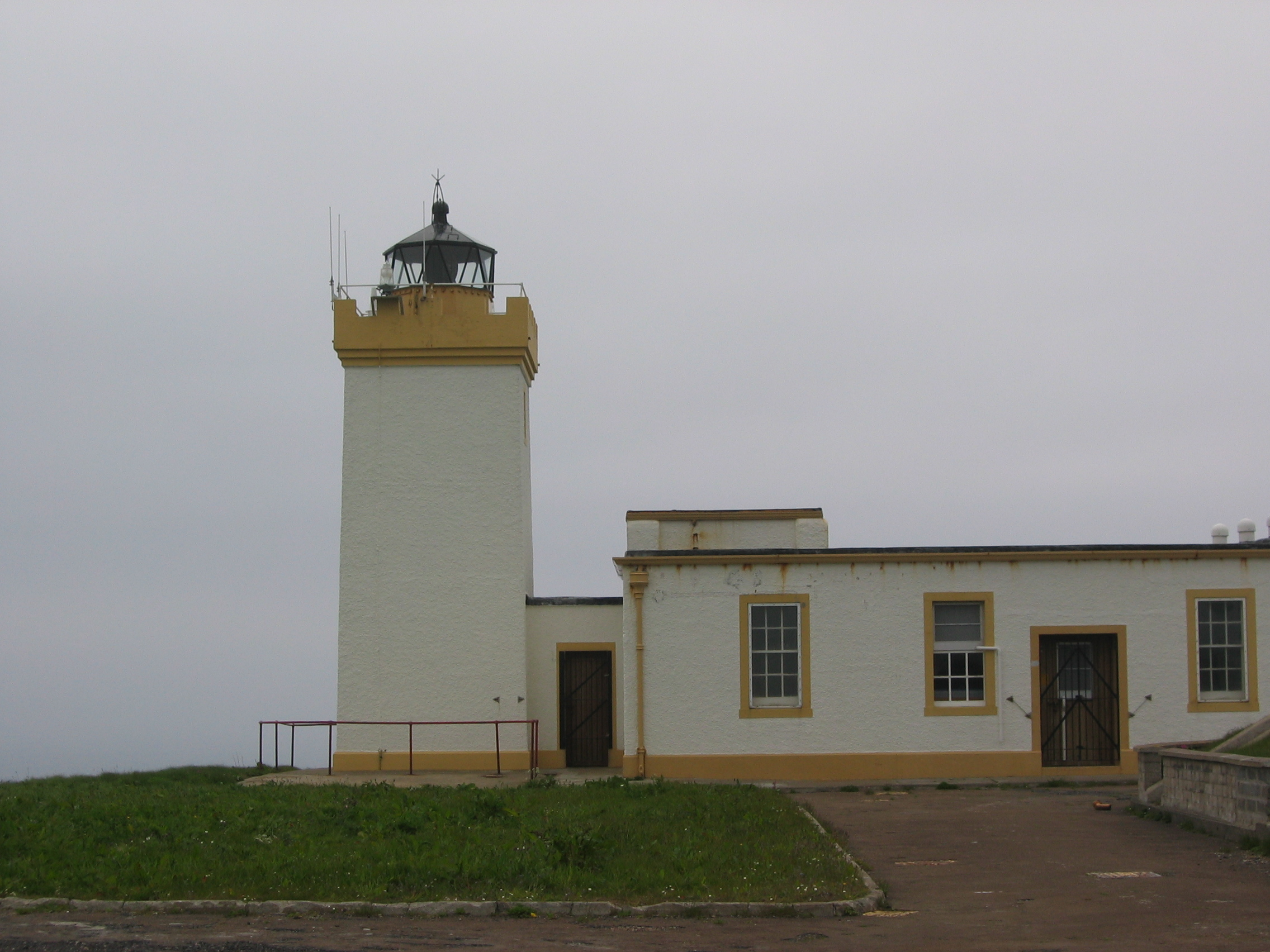
Duncansby Head Lighthouse

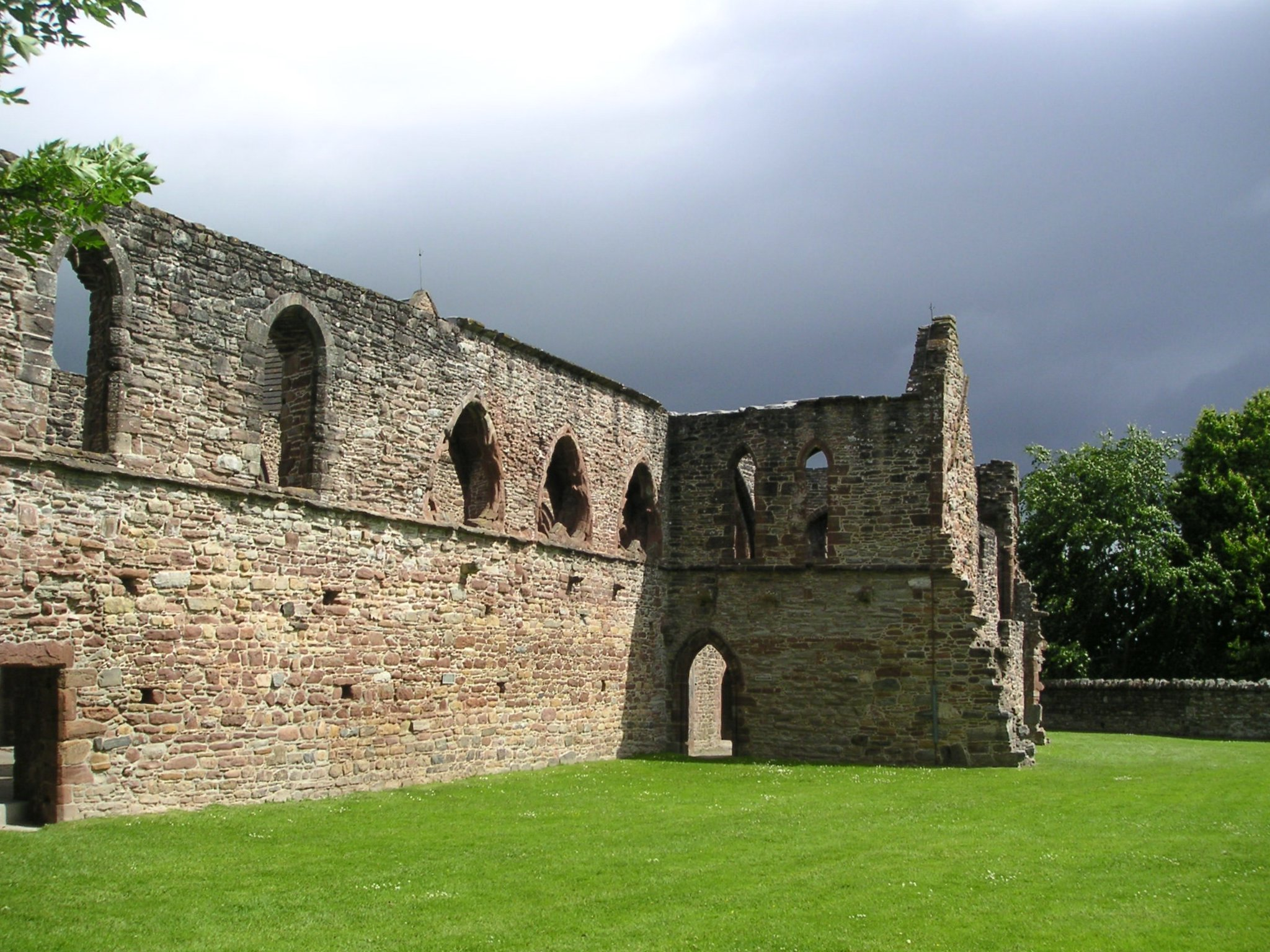
Beauly Priory

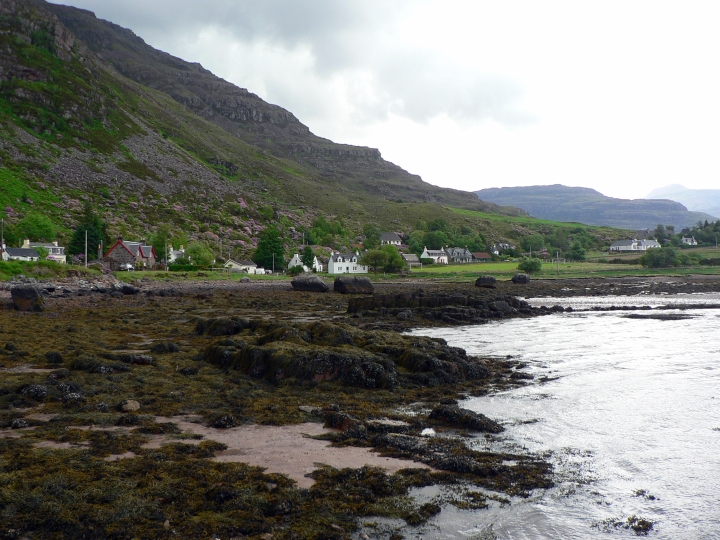
Torridon

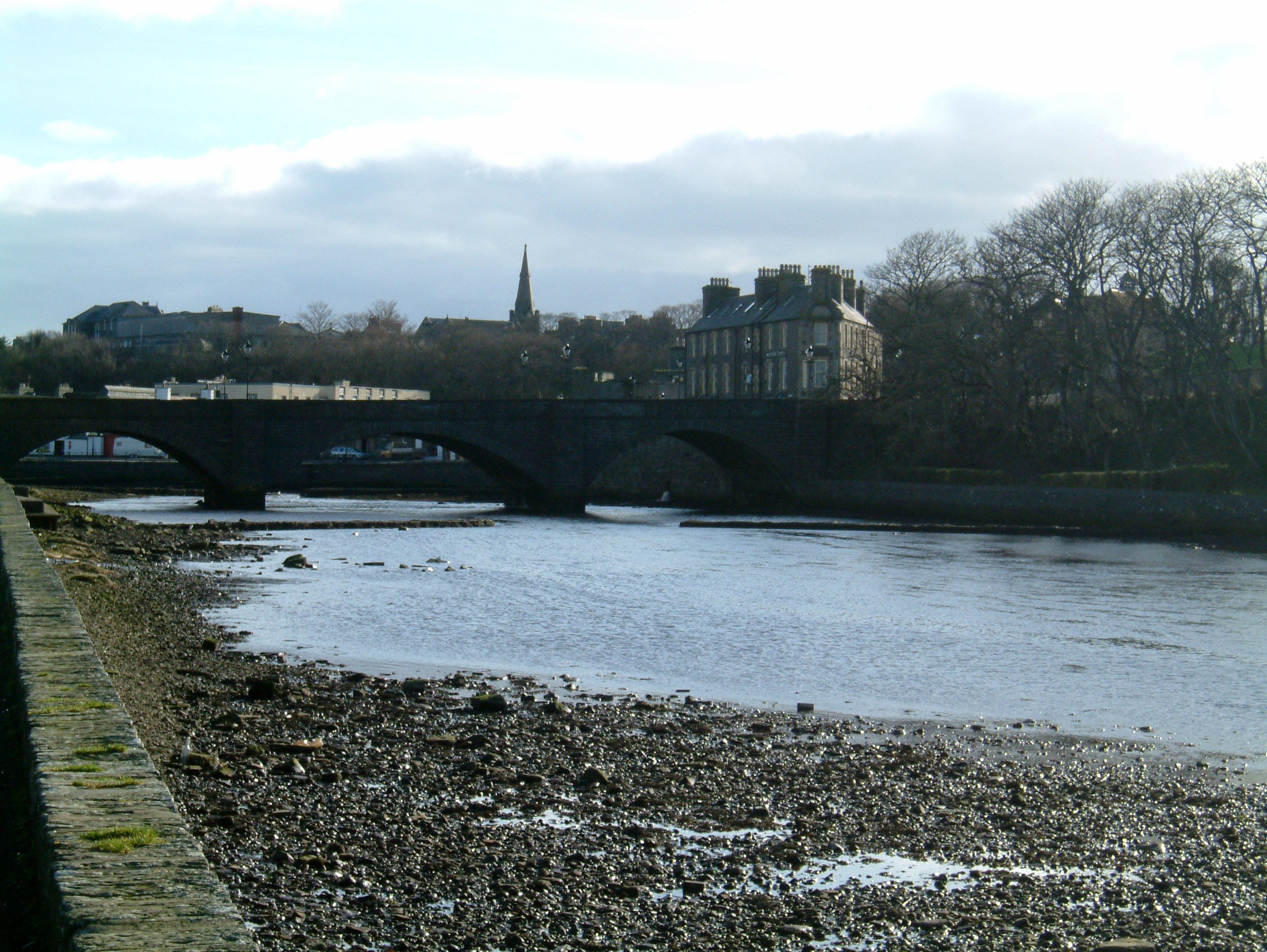
Wick

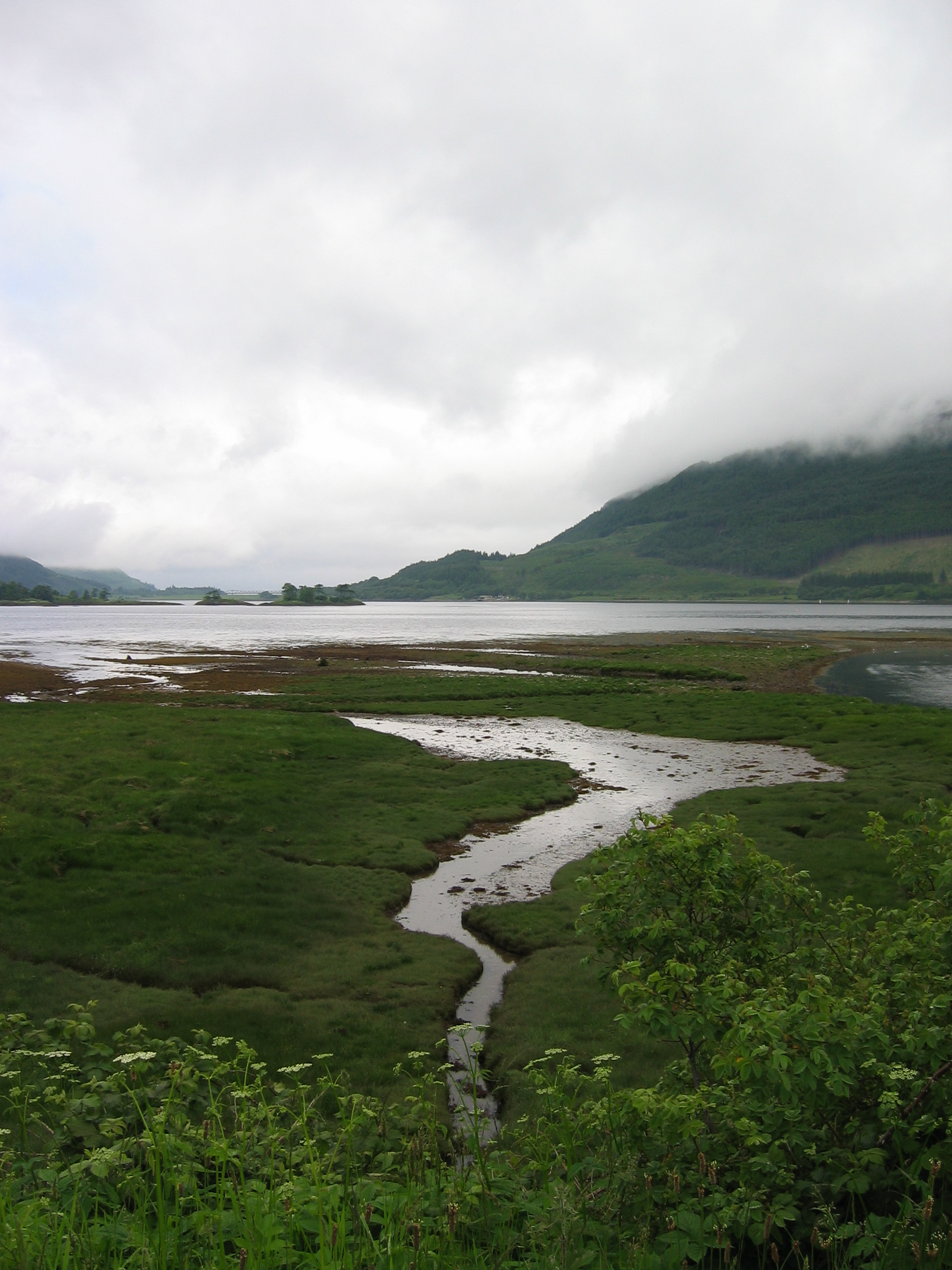
Glencoe

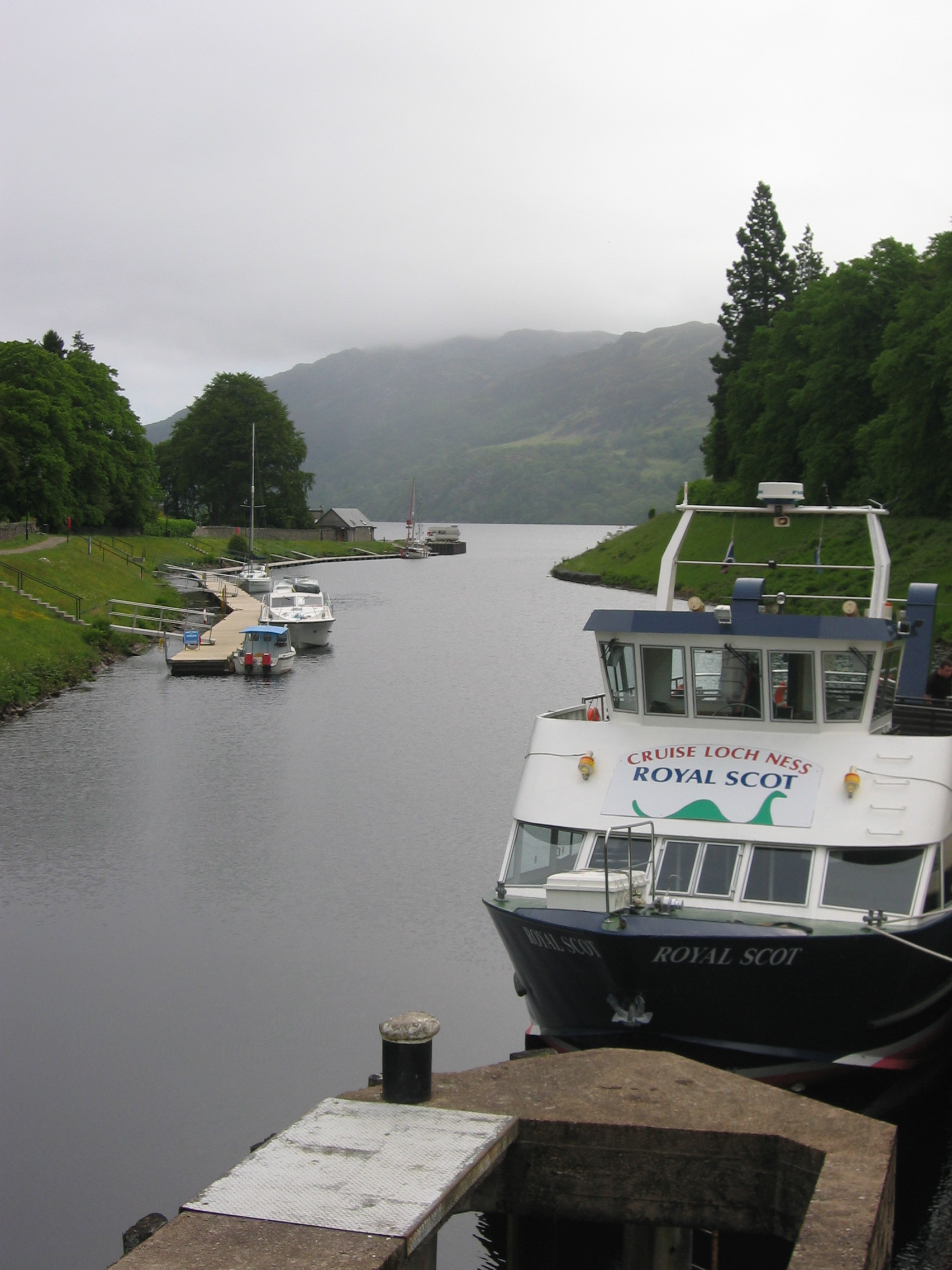
Fort Augustus, Loch Ness

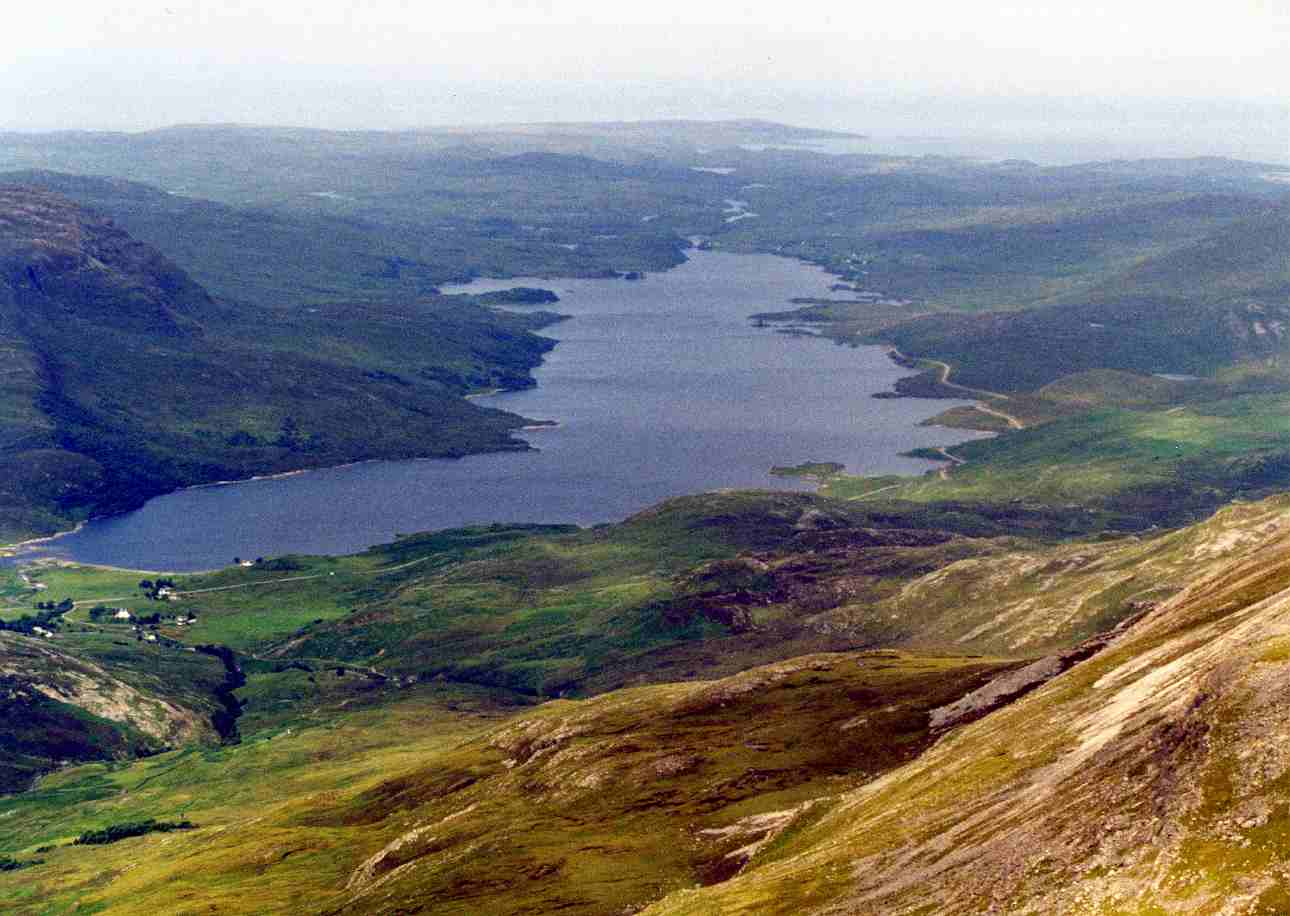
Loch Assynt

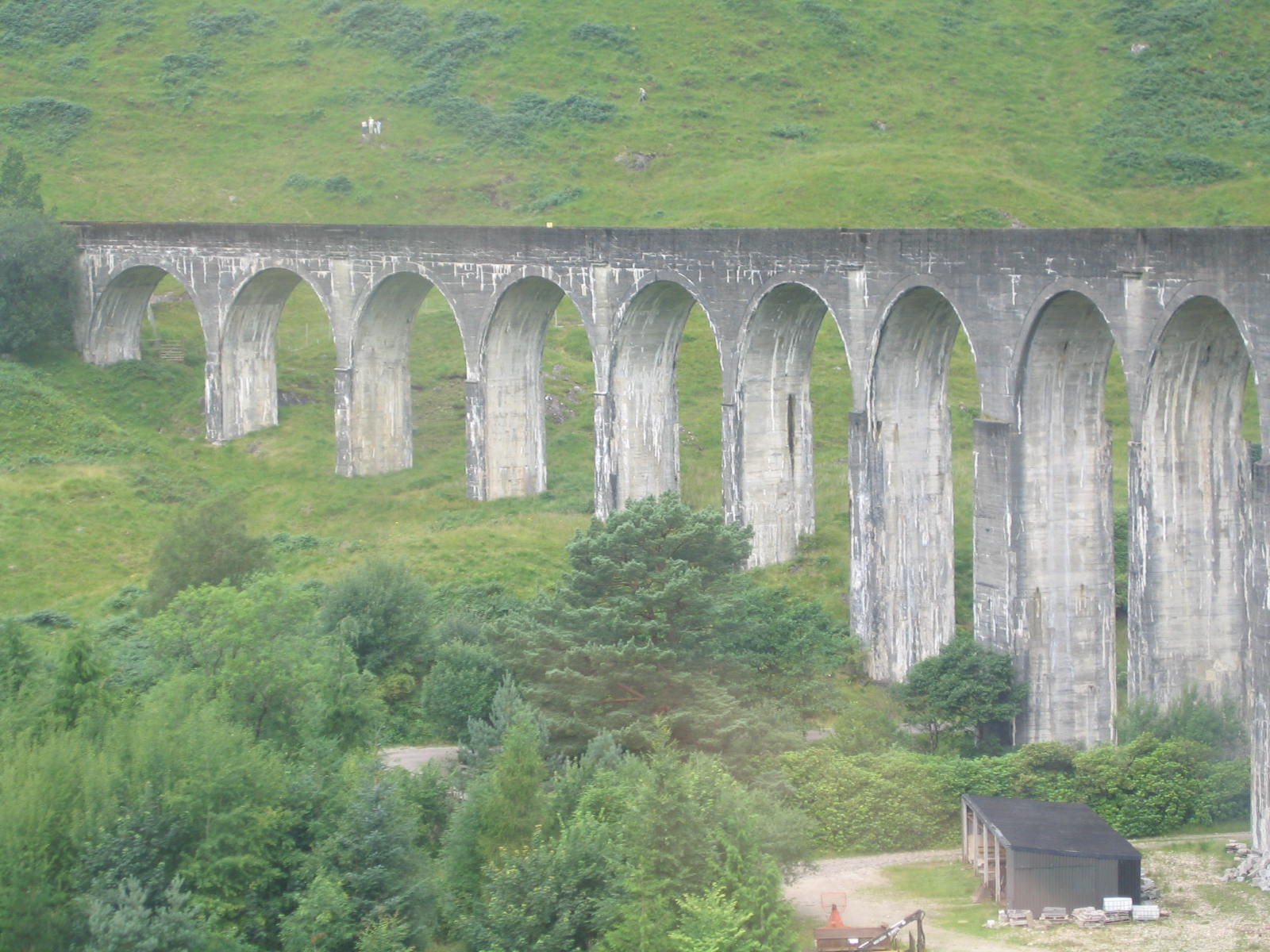
Jacobite Train, Glenfinnan

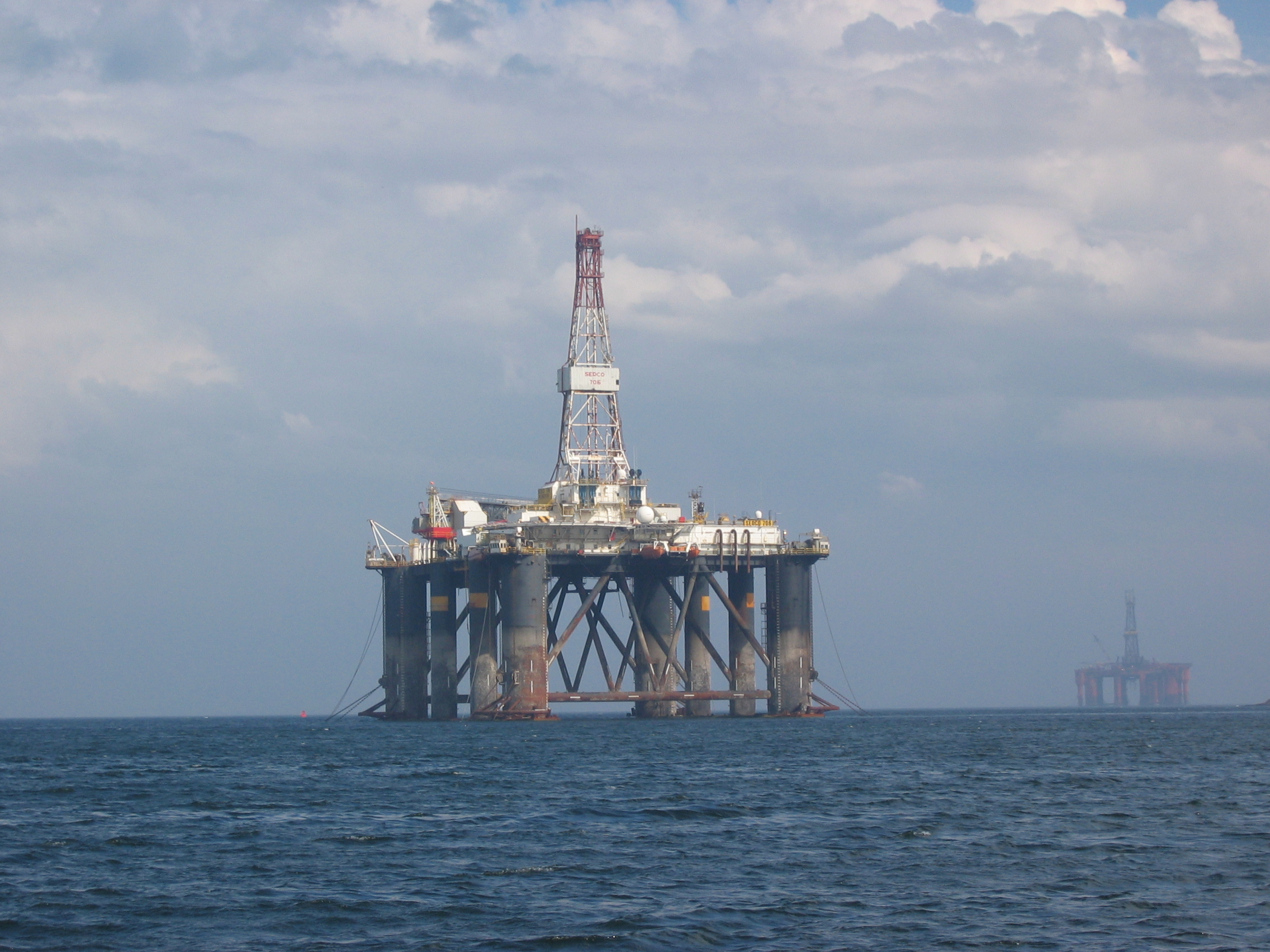
Oil Rig, Cromarty

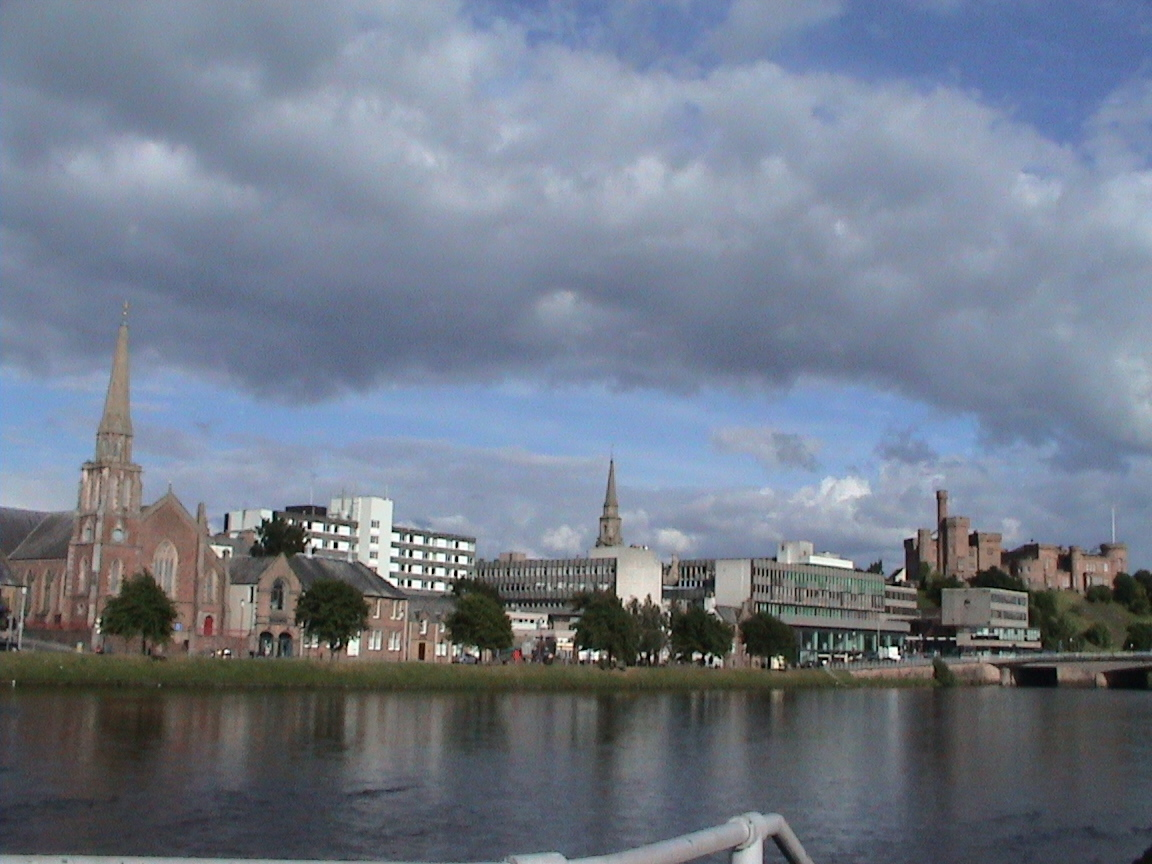
Over the bridge to Inverness

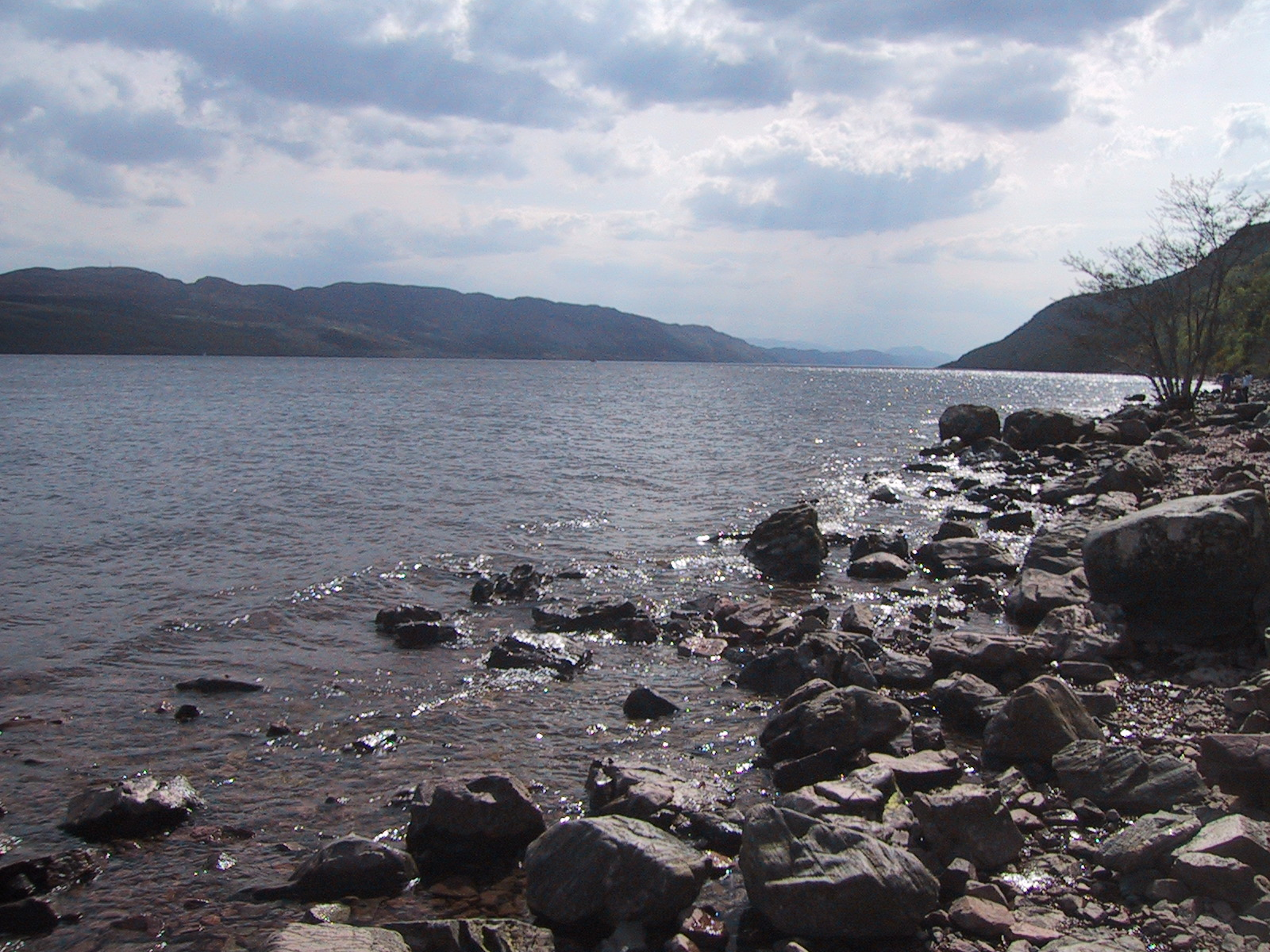
Loch Ness

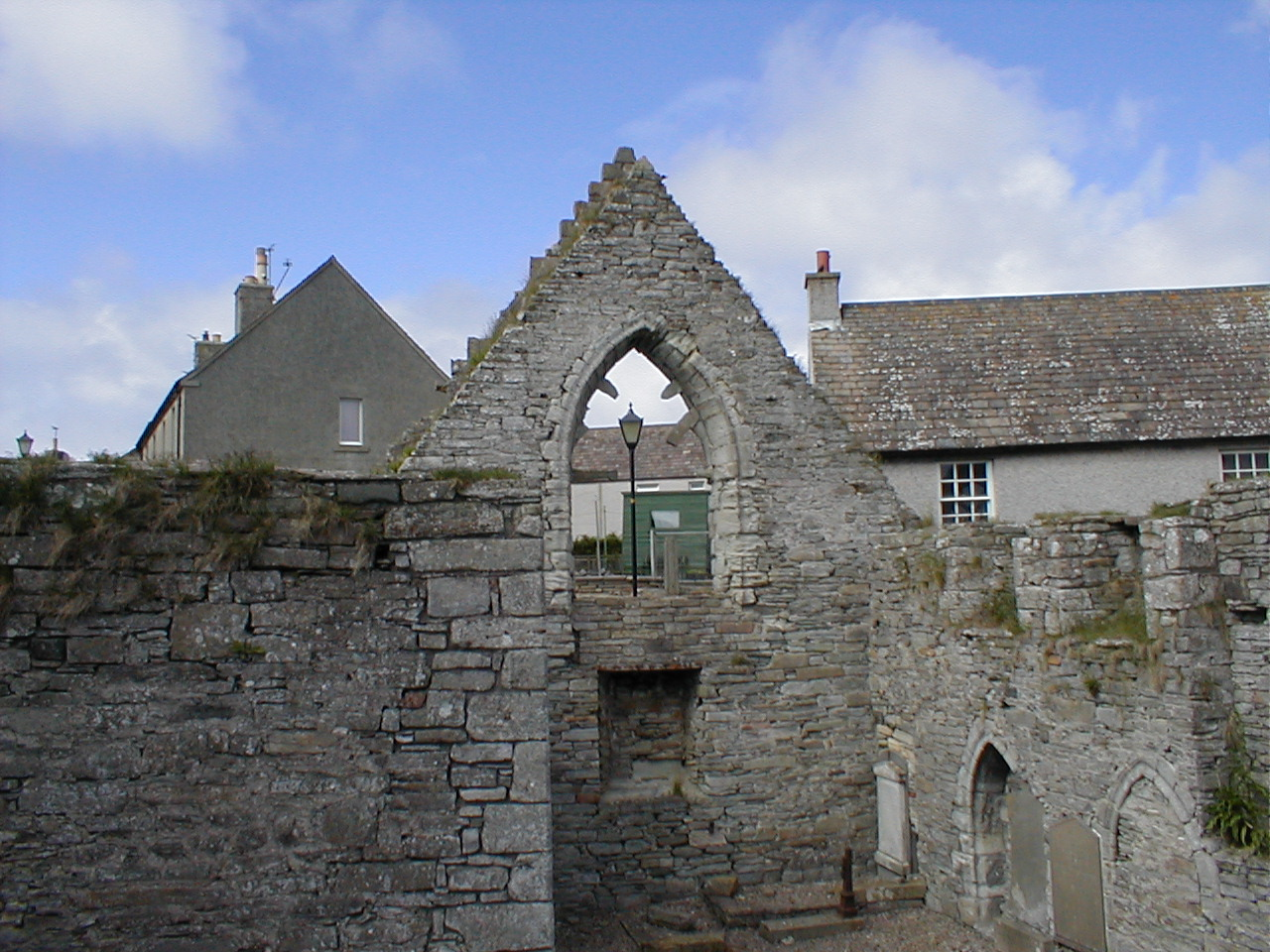
Thurso, St. Peter's Kirk

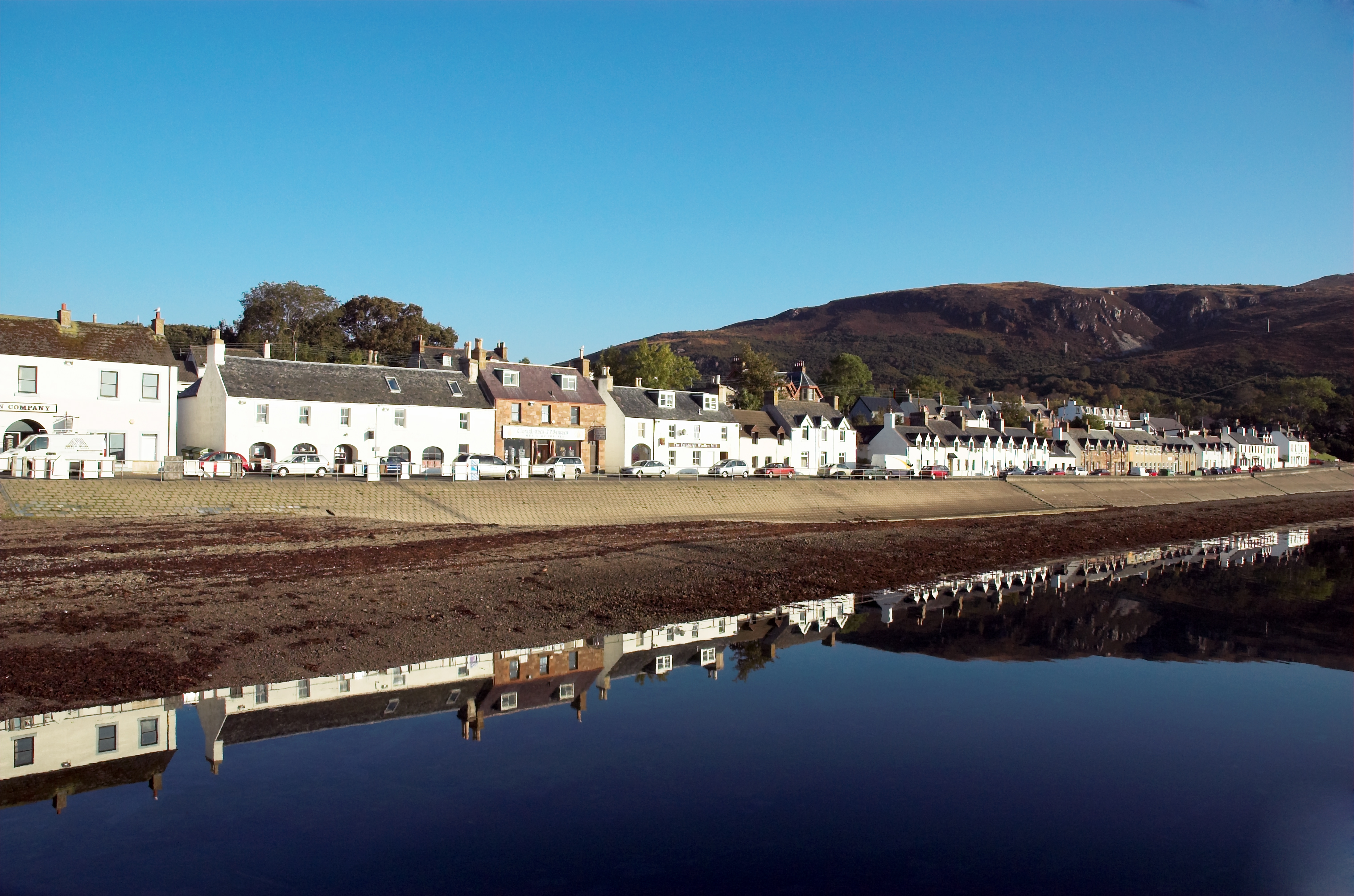
Ullapool

== A ==
- Aberarder, Aberchalder, Abriachan, Achachork, Achanalt
- Achandunie, Acharacle, Achany, Achaphubuil, Acharn, Achateny, Ach' An Todhair, Achentoul
- Achgarve, Achiemore (near Durness), Achiemore (Strath Halladale), A'Chill, Achiltibuie
- Achina, Achinahuagh, Achintee, Achintee, Achintraid, Achininver, Achinduich, Achingills, Achmore
- Achnabat, Achnacarnin, Achnacarry, Achnaconeran, Achnacloich, Achnagarron, Achnaha, Achnahanat, Achnahannet
- Achnasaul, Achnasheen, Achnashellach, Achriesgill, Ackergill
- Achosnich, Achuvoldrach, Achvarasdal, Achylyness, Achvaich
- Aigas, Aird of Sleat, Alcaig, Aldourie, An Ard, Ankerville
- Allanfearn, Allangrange Mains, Alligin, Alligin Shuas, Allt-na-h-Airbhe, Allt-nan-Sugh, Alness
- Altandhu, Altass, Altnaharra, Altrua, Alvie, Anaheilt, Anancaun, Annat
- Annishader, Applecross, Arabella, Ard-dhubh, Ardachu, Ardaneaskan, Ardarroch, Ardcharnich, Ardchronie, Ardclach
- Ardechive, Ardelve, Ardendrain, Ardersier, Ardery
- Ardessie, Ardgay, Ardindrean, Ardmair, Ardmolich, Ardmore
- Ardnagrask, Ardnastang, Ardross, Ardshealach, Ardtoe, Ardtornish
- Ardullie, Ardvannie, Ardvasar, Arisaig, Arivegaig
- Armadale (Skye), Armadale (Sutherland), Arnisdale, Arnish, Arnisort, Arpafeelie, Ashaig
- Attadale, Auchentoul, Auchindrean, Auchtertyre, Auckengill
- Aultbea, Aultgrishan, Aultiphurst
- Avielochan, Aviemore, Avochf

== B ==
- Back of Keppoch, Backies, Badachro, Badcall
- Badcaul, Badnaban, Badninish, Badluarach, Badrallach
- Badicaul, Balachuim, Balbeg, Balblair
- Balchladich, Balchraggan, Balchrick, Balgown
- Balintore, Balintraid, Ballachulish, Balleigh, Balloch
- Balmacara, Balmacara Square, Balmeanach (Raasay), Balmeanach (Skye)
- Balnabruich, Balnafoich, Balnain, Balnapaling, Balnacoil
- Balnacra, Balnakeil, Balvraid, Baramore
- Barbaraville, Barnyards, Bualintur, Beauly
- Beoraidbeg, Benavie, Berriedale, Bernisdale
- Bettyhill, Big Sand, Bishop Kinkell
- Blaich, Blairmore, Blarnalearoch, Boat of Garten
- Bogallan, Bogroy, Bohuntine
- Bonar Bridge, Borgue, Bornesketaig, Borreraig, Bottacks, Borve, Bower
- Bracadale, Branault, Brawl, Brae
- Brea of Achnahaird, Breckrey, Broadford, Brochel
- Brogaig, Brora, Broubster, Brough
- Bruan, Buldoo, Bunacaimb, Bunarkaig, Bunloit, Bunchrew

== C ==
- Camas Luinie, Camastianavaig, Camault Muir, Camore, Camuscross
- Camusnagaul, Camusteel, Camusterrach, Canisbay, Canna
- Cannich, Carbost (Loch Harport), Carbost (Portree)
- Carnach, Carrbridge, Castletown, Catlodge, Cawdor, Charlestown (Black Isle), Charlestown (Wester Ross)
- Clachtoll, Claigan
- Clashnessie, Cleadale, Clephanton, Clovullin, Clyth, Clunes
- Coille Mhorgil, Coillore, Colbost, Coldbackie, Conon Bridge
- Conordan, Contin, Corntown, Corpach, Corran (Lochaber), Corran (Skye and Lochalsh), Corriechatachan
- Corrimony, Corry, Coulags, Coylumbridge, Cove
- Craigton, Crask, Crask of Aigas
- Croftnacreich, Croick, Cromarty, Crosskirk, Croy
- Culbokie, Culburnie, Culcairn, Culcharry, Culduie
- Cullicudden, Culloden, Culkein, Culrain

== D ==
- Dalchalm, Dalchreichart, Dalelia
- Dalhalvaig, Dalnabreck, Dalnavert, Dalreavoch
- Dalwhinnie, Daviot, Delny, Digg, Dingwall
- Dochgarroch, Doll, Dornie, Dornoch, Dores
- Dorrery, Doune, Dounie, Dounreay, Drimnin, Droman, Druimarben, Druimindarroch
- Drumbeg, Drumbuie, Drumfearn
- Drumnadrochit, Drumuie, Drumuillie, Drynoch
- Duirinish (Lochalsh), Duirinish (Skye), Duisdalebeg, Duisdalemore, Duisky, Dulnain Bridge, Dunan
- Dunbeath, Duncanston, Dundonnell
- Dunnet, Dunnet Forest, Dunnet Head, Duntulm, Dunvegan, Durness, Duthil

== E ==
- Eabost, Earlish, East Croachy, East Mey
- Easter Kinkell, Edderton, Edinbane
- Eilean Donan, Eilean Shona
- East Langwell, Elgol, Elishader
- Elphin, Embo, Erbusaig, Eriboll, Errogie, Essich, Etteridge, Evanton
- Evelix, Eynort, Eyre (Raasay), Eyre (Skye)

== F ==
- Fanagmore, Farr (Strathnairn), Farr (Sutherland), Fasach, Fassfern
- Feorlig, Fearn, Fearns, Ferindonald, Feriniquarrie, Ferness, Fersit
- Ferrindonald, Fisherton, Fiskavaig
- Fiunary, Flashader, Flodigarry, Fodderty, Foindle, Forse, Forss
- Fort Augustus, Fort George, Fort William
- Forsinard, Fortrose, Foyers, Fresgoe, Freswick

== G ==
- Galltair, Galtrigill, Garafad, Garros
- Gartymore, Garve, Gairloch, Gairlochy, Galmisdale
- Geary, Gedintailor, Gillen, Gills
- Glaichbea, Glame, Glasphein, Glen Affric
- Glenancross, Glenborrodale, Glencoe, Glendale
- Glenfinnan, Glenelg, Glengrasco, Glenmore, Glenuig
- Golspie, Gorstan, Gorthleck, Grudie, Gruids

== H ==
- Halistra, Halkirk, Hallin, Ham, Harlosh, Harrapool, Haster
- Heaste, Helmsdale, Heights of Kinlochewe, Highbridge, Hill of Fearn
- Hilton, Hilton of Cadboll, Houstry, Huna, Hungladder

== I ==
- Idrigill, Incheril, Inchmore (Kirkhill), Inchmore (Strathfarrar), Inchnadamph, Inchree, Insh, Inshegra, Inver
- Inverailort, Inveralligin, Inveran, Inverdruie, Inverarish, Inverchoran
- Invergordon, Inverfarigaig, Invergarry, Inverinate, Inverkirkaig, Inverlochy
- Invermoidart, Invermoriston, Invernaver, Inverness, Inverroy, Invershin, Isle of Skye, Isleornsay

== J ==
- Jamestown, Jemimaville, John o' Groats

== K ==
- Keiss, Kensaleyre, Kentra, Kilchoan, Kildary, Kildonan
- Killen, Killilan, Killimster, Kilmaluag, Kilmarie, Kilmonivaig, Kilmorack, Kilmore, Kilmory
- Kilmuir (Black Isle), Kilmuir (Easter Ross), Kilmuir (Skye), Kilphedir, Kiltarlity, Kilvaxter
- Kinbrace, Kincardine, Kincraig, Kingsburgh, Kingussie
- Kinloch Laggan, Kinlochbervie, Kinlochchiel, Kinlochewe, Kinlochleven
- Kinlochmoidart, Kirkhill, Kirkibost
- Knockan, Knockfarrel, Kyle of Lochalsh, Kyleakin, Kylerhea, Kylesku, Kylestrome

== L ==
- Laga, Laggan (Badenoch), Laggan (Great Glen), Laide (Sutherland), Laide (Ross-shire), Lairg, Lamington, Landhallow
- Latheron, Latheronwheel, Leachkin, Lealt
- Leckfurin, Leckmelm, Ledgowan, Lednagullin
- Leirinmore, Lenie, Lentran, Lephin, Letterewe, Letterfearn
- Letters (Ross and Cromerty), Lewiston, Liddesdale
- Linsidemore, Linicro, Littleferry, Littlemill
- Lochailort, Loch Alsh, Lochaline
- Lochbay, Lochcarron, Lochinver
- Lochslin, Logie Hill
- Londubh, Lonemore (Ross and Cromerty), Lonemore (Sutherland)
- Lothbeg, Lower Badcall, Lower Breakish, Lower Diabaig
- Lower Milovaig, Luib, Lubcroy, Lubinvullin, Lusta, Lybster, Lynchat, Lynne of Gorthleck

== M ==
- Maligar, Mallaig, Marishader, Marybank, Maryburgh
- Mellon Charles, Mellon Udrigle, Melness, Melvaig, Melvich, Merkadale, Mey
- Milovaig, Midtown, Milton (Easter Ross), Milton (Glenurquhart),
- Morar, Morefield, Morvich
- Mountgerald, Moy, Muie
- Muir of Allangrange, Muir of Ord, Muir of Tarradale, Muirshearlich
- Murlaggan, Munlochy, Murkle, Mybster

== N ==
- Nairn, Nedd, Nethy Bridge
- Newlands of Geise, Newfield, Newport
- Newton of Ardtoe
- Newton of Ferintosh, Newton of Kinkell
- Newtonmore, Nigg
- North Ballachulish, North Erradale, North Kessock
- Nostie, Nybster

== O ==
- Ockle, Oldshore Beg, Oldshoremore, Ollach, Onich
- Ormiscaig, Ormsaigmore, Opinan (Gairloch), Opinan (Laide), Ose

== P ==
- Papigoe, Peinachorran, Peinchorran, Peiness, Penifiler
- Piperhill, Pitcalnie, Pittentrail, Plockton, Polbain
- Polglass, Polloch, Poolewe
- Portgower, Portnancon, Portnalong, Portnaluchaig, Portmahomack
- Port Henderson, Port Mòr, Portree, Portskerra, Portuairk
- Proncycroy, Pulrossie

== R ==
- Raasay, Raddery, Ramasaig, Ramscraig, Ranochan, Ratagan
- Rearquhar, Reay, Reaster
- Redpoint, Regoul, Reiff, Reiss, Resaurie, Resipole, Rhelonie
- Rhiconich, Rhiroy, Rhue
- Roadside, Roag, Rockfield, Rogart
- Rosehall, Rosemarkie, Roshven
- Roster, Roybridge, Ruilick, Rùm, Ruthven (Badenoch)

== S ==
- Saasaig, Salen (Ardnamurchan), Sallachy, Saltburn, Sand, Sangobeg, Sanna
- Sarclet, Saval, Satran, Scalpay (Inner Hebrides)
- Scarfskerry, Sconser, Scourie
- Scrabster, Sculamus, Shandwick, Shebster
- Shiel Bridge, Shieldaig, Shieldaig, Shielfoot, Shona Beag
- Skeabost, Skelpick
- Skerray, Skinnet, Skinidin, Skirza, Skulamus
- Skullomie, Skye of Curr, Sligachan, Sluggans, Smerral, Smithton, Sordale
- South Ballachulish, South Duntulm, South Erradale, South Garvan
- South Laggan, South Oscaig, Spean Bridge
- Spinningdale, Spittal, Staffin, Staxigoe, Stein, Stenscholl
- Strath, Strathan (Melness), Strathan (Sutherland), Strathaird, Strathcanaird, Strathcarron
- Strathpeffer, Strathrusdale, Stromeferry, Stronchreggan, Stronenaba, Strontian
- Stoer, Struan, Struy, Suladale, Swiney, Swordale, Swordly, Syre

== T ==
- Taagan, Tain, Talisker, Talladale, Talmine, Tarbet, Tarskavaig, Teangue
- Thrumster, Thurso
- Tokavaig, Tomatin, Tomchrasky, Tomnacross, Tongue, Tore
- Torgormack, Tornagrain, Torridon, Torrin, Torrisdale
- Torvaig, Toscaig, Totaig, Tote, Toulvaddie
- Tournaig, Trantlebeg, Trantlemore, Treaslane, Trislaig, Trotternish, Trumpan, Tulloch

== U ==
- Uig (Duirinish), Uig (Snizort), Uigshader, Ulbster, Ullapool, Ullinish
- Upper Ardchronie, Upper Badcall, Upper Bighouse, Upper Breakish
- Upper Camster, Upper Lybster, Upper Milovaig, Urray

== V ==
- Valtos, Vatten

== W ==
- Waternish, Watten, Westhill, West Clyne
- West Helmsdale, West Langwell, Wester Aberchalder, Westerdale
- Westfield, Weydale, Whitebridge, Whiterow, Wick, Windhill

== See also ==
- Caithness, Sutherland, Ross-shire
- Cromartyshire, Inverness-shire
- Morayshire, Nairnshire, Argyll
- Scottish Highlands
- List of towns and villages in the Scottish Highlands
