= Rhue =

Rhue may refer to:

- Rhue, Scotland, a small settlement north of Ullapool.
- Morton Rhue, a pen name used by Todd Strasser.
- Madlyn Rhue, an American character actress.
- Rhue (river), a tributary of the Dordogne, central France.
