= Allangrange =

Allangrange may refer to:

== Places in Scotland ==
- Allangrange Mains, Highland, Scotland
- Muir of Allangrange, Highland, Scotland

== See also ==
- Allangrange railway station, station in Ross and Cromarty
