= Doune, Highland =

Coordinates: 57.9691°N 4.6307°W

Doune: Scottish Gaelic: An Dùn
- Location within the Sutherland area
- OS grid reference: NC445007
- Council area: Highland
- Country: Scotland
- Sovereign state: United Kingdom
- Post town: Lairg
- Postcode district: IV24 3
- Police: Scotland
- Fire: Scottish
- Ambulance: Scottish

Doune is a remote hamlet on the south bank of the River Oykel, situated 2 miles west of Rosehall and 5 miles east of Lubcroy, in Sutherland, Scottish Highlands and is in the Scottish council area of Highland.

It lies within the civil parish of Kincardine and Community council or Ardgay and District.
