= Allt-na-h-Airbhe =

Coordinates: 57.88755°N 5.1838°W

Allt-na-h-Airbhe: Scottish Gaelic: Allt na h-Airbhe
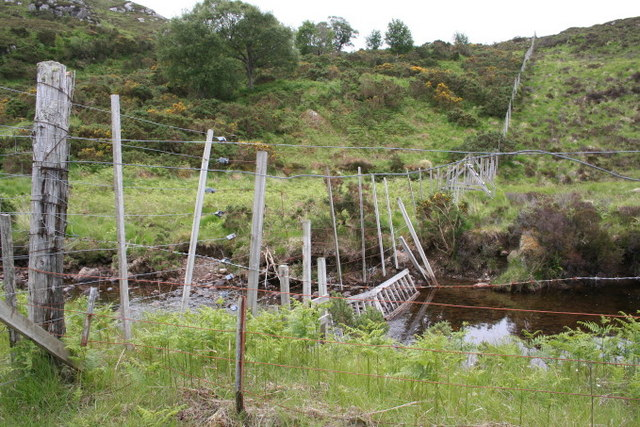
- The Allt-na-h-Airbhe stream

- Location within the Highland council area
- OS grid reference: NH113931
- Council area: Highland
- Country: Scotland
- Sovereign state: United Kingdom
- Postcode district: IV23 2
- Police: Scotland
- Fire: Scottish
- Ambulance: Scottish
- UK Parliament: Ross, Skye and Lochaber
- Scottish Parliament: Caithness, Sutherland and Ross

Allt-na-h-Airbhe (Scottish Gaelic: Allt na h-Airbhe), "stream at the boundary wall", is a small crofting settlement close to Ullapool, Ross and Cromarty, on the west shore of Loch Broom, and is within the council of Highland, Scotland.

== See also ==
- Morefield
- Stornoway (by ferry)
- Ullapool bolide impact
