= Ach' An Todhair =

Coordinates: 56.79997°N 5.13596°W

Ach An Todhair: Scottish Gaelic: Achadh an Todhair
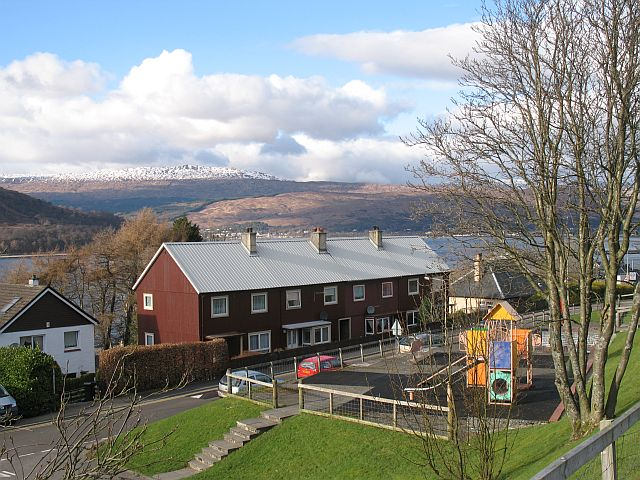
- Ach' An Todhair

- Location within the Lochaber area
- OS grid reference: NN086719
- Council area: Highland
- Country: Scotland
- Sovereign state: United Kingdom
- Post town: Fort William
- Postcode district: PH33 6
- Police: Scotland
- Fire: Scottish
- Ambulance: Scottish
- UK Parliament: Ross, Skye and Lochaber
- Scottish Parliament: Skye, Lochaber and Badenoch

Ach' An Todhair is a small hamlet on the shore of Loch Linnhe in the Highland council area, Scotland. It is located along the A82 road directly south of Fort William. A bus serves the hamlet, connecting it to Fort William in the north and Corran and Inchree to the south. A number of graves of Clan Campbell are said to be located in this area of the lochside. It is mentioned in a poem in Hugh MacDiarmid's poetry collection The golden treasury of Scottish poetry which goes, "the sloucher of them was lying in Ach' an Todhair. Whoso climbed Tom na-h-aire ? Many were the new paws there badly salted, the death-cloud on their eyes, lifeless after being scourged with sword-blades".

A 174.86-hectare (432.1-acre) area of woodland near the hamlet has been designated as a Site of Special Scientific Interest (SSSI). It was formerly part of the Loch Linnhe SSSI which was established in 1967.
