= Ardechive =

Coordinates: 56.96537°N 5.05873°W

Ardechive: Scottish Gaelic: Àird Eachbhaidh
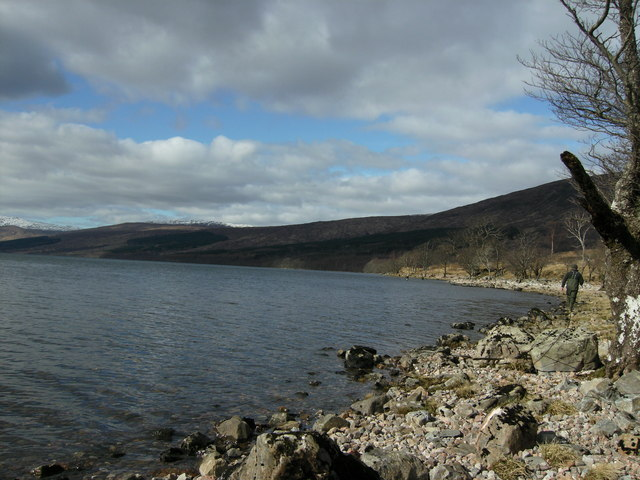
- Loch Arkaig shoreline west of Achnasaul A great spot on Loch Arkaig for fishing, looking along the shoreline towards the inflow of Allt Aird Eachaidh at Ardechive.

- Location within the Lochaber area
- OS grid reference: NN141901
- Council area: Highland
- Country: Scotland
- Sovereign state: United Kingdom
- Post town: SPEAN BRIDGE
- Postcode district: PH34
- Police: Scotland
- Fire: Scottish
- Ambulance: Scottish
- UK Parliament: Ross, Skye and Lochaber
- Scottish Parliament: Skye, Lochaber and Badenoch

Ardechive (Scottish Gaelic: Àird Eachbhaidh) is a small crofting hamlet, located on the shores of Loch Arkaig, close to Achnasaul and Spean Bridge, county of Inverness-shire, Scotland, within the Scottish council area of Highland.
