= Rhelonie =

Hamlet in Scotland

Coordinates: 57.9429°N 4.4408°W

Rhelonie: Scottish Gaelic: Ruigh an Lòin
- Location within the Sutherland area
- OS grid reference: NH556972
- Council area: Highland
- Country: Scotland
- Sovereign state: United Kingdom
- Post town: Ardgay
- Postcode district: IV24 3
- Police: Scotland
- Fire: Scottish
- Ambulance: Scottish

Rhelonie (Scottish Gaelic: Ruigh an Lòin) is a crofting hamlet in the Highland region of Scotland.

Rhelonie is 2 miles (3 km) northwest of the village of Culrain and4 miles (6 km) northwest of Ardgay, 2 miles (3 km) west of Rhelonie lies the crofting hamlet of Achnahanat.
