= Eabost =

Coordinates: 57.364919°N 6.458896°W

Eabost: Scottish Gaelic: Eidheabost
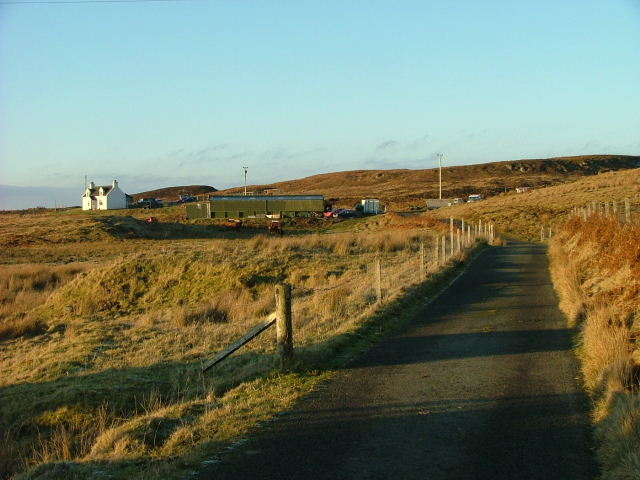
- Farm at Eabost

- Location within the Isle of Skye
- OS grid reference: NG696125
- Council area: Highland
- Lieutenancy area: Ross and Cromarty
- Country: Scotland
- Sovereign state: United Kingdom
- Post town: ISLE OF SKYE
- Police: Scotland
- Fire: Scottish
- Ambulance: Scottish
- UK Parliament: Inverness, Skye and West Ross-shire
- Scottish Parliament: Skye, Lochaber and Badenoch

Eabost (Scottish Gaelic: Eidheabost) is a hamlet in the civil parish of Bracadale, on the Isle of Skye, in the council area of Highland, Scotland.

== Politics ==
Eabost is part of the Inverness, Skye and West Ross-shire constituency for elections to the House of Commons of the United Kingdom.

Eabost is part of the Skye, Lochaber and Badenoch constituency for elections to the Scottish Parliament.

== See also ==
- List of places in Highland (council area)
