= Achvaich =

Coordinates: 57.92011°N 4.17439°W

Achvaich: Scottish Gaelic: Achadh a' Bhàthaich
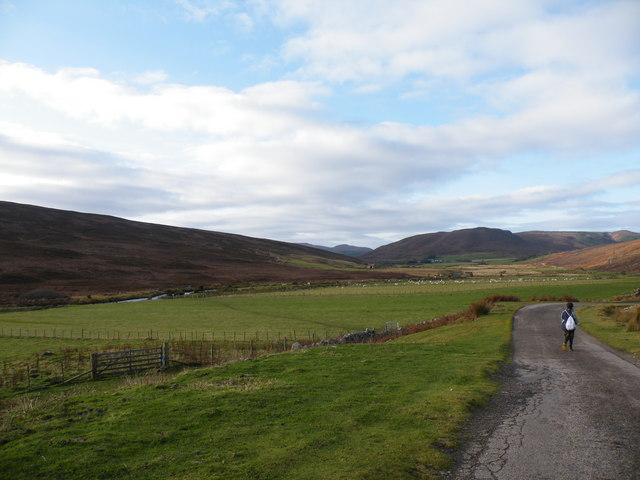

- Location within the Sutherland area
- OS grid reference: NH712943
- Council area: Highland
- Country: Scotland
- Sovereign state: United Kingdom
- Postcode district: IV25 3
- Police: Scotland
- Fire: Scottish
- Ambulance: Scottish
- UK Parliament: Caithness, Sutherland and Easter Ross
- Scottish Parliament: Caithness, Sutherland and Ross

Achvaich (Scottish Gaelic: Achadh a' Bhàthaich) is a remote crofting settlement in the Dornoch, Achvaich Sutherland area and is within the Scottish council area of Highland.
