= Uigshader =

Coordinates: 57.43534°N 6.28778°W

Uigshader: Scottish Gaelic: Ùigseadar
- Location within the Isle of Skye
- OS grid reference: NG427464
- Council area: Highland
- Country: Scotland
- Sovereign state: United Kingdom
- Post town: Portree
- Postcode district: IV51 9
- Police: Scotland
- Fire: Scottish
- Ambulance: Scottish

Uigshader (from Old Norse Vík-sœtr 'dwelling at the riverbend', Scottish Gaelic: Ùigseadar) is a settlement on the Isle of Skye in Scotland.

The settlement is 2 miles (3 kilometres) south of Carbost and 4 miles (6 kilometres) northwest of Portree. The River Snizort flows north to the west of this settlement.

The hamlet of Peiness is located less than 1/2 mile (800 metres) from Uigshader.

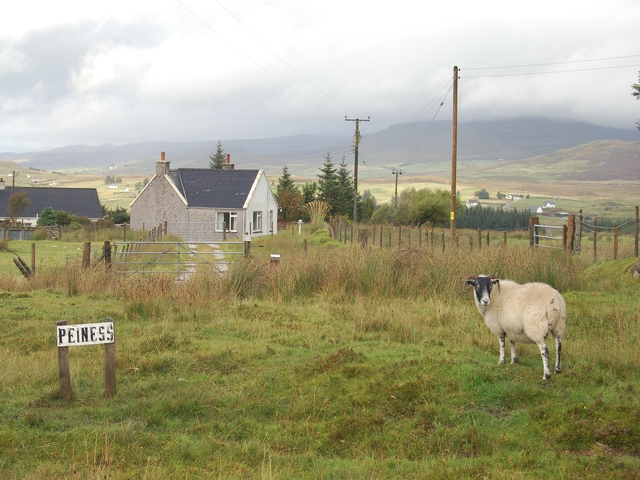
Peiness
