= Proncycroy =

Coordinates: 57°53′48″N 4°4′7″W

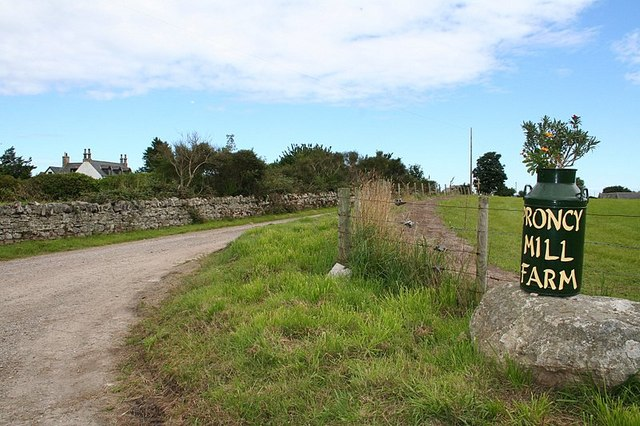
The lane to Proncycroy Farm

Proncycroy Farm (Scottish Gaelic: Prannsaidh Cruaidh) otherwise known as Mill Farm, is in the Sutherland region of the Scottish council area of Highland located less than two miles from Dornoch.
