= Inveralligin =

Coordinates: 57.55657°N 5.61026°W

Inveralligin: Scottish Gaelic: Inbhir Àiliginn
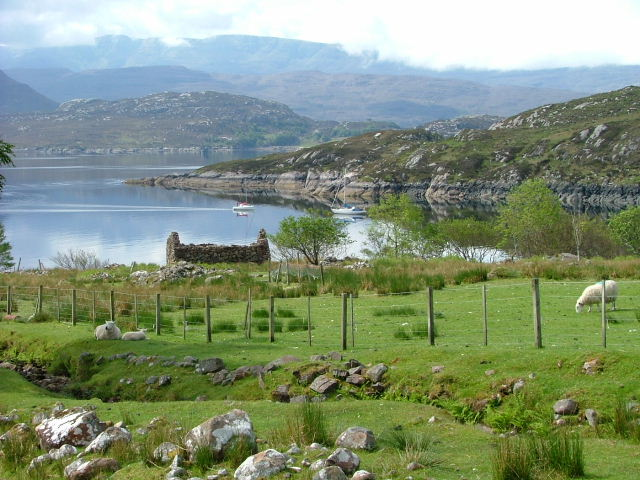
- Ruin overlooking Ob a' Bhraighe Taken from Wester Alligin.

- Location within the Ross and Cromarty area
- OS grid reference: NG841575
- Council area: Highland
- Country: Scotland
- Sovereign state: United Kingdom
- Postcode district: IV22 2
- Police: Scotland
- Fire: Scottish
- Ambulance: Scottish
- UK Parliament: Ross, Skye and Lochaber
- Scottish Parliament: Caithness, Sutherland and Ross

Inveralligin (Scottish Gaelic: Inbhir Àiliginn) is a remote crofting township which lies on the north shore of Loch Torridon in Wester Ross and is in the Scottish council area of Highland. Inbhir Àiliginn means "at the mouth of the River Alligin".

Torridon lies to the east and Lower Diabaig about 5 kilometres (3.1 mi) to the west. Alligin Shuas lies immediately to the west. This name is also of Gaelic origin: alligin may be from àilleag meaning "jewel" and shuas means "western" or "upper".

Wester Alligin, the western part of the Torridon estate, stayed with the family of the Canadian banker Sir Charles Gordon, the estate's owner from 1924 until his death in 1939, after the rest of the estate was sold; in 1968 his sons gave its 2,000 acres to the National Trust for Scotland in memory of their parents, reuniting it with the Trust's Torridon estate.
