= Achandunie =

Coordinates: 57.7184°N 4.2772°W

Achandunie: Scottish Gaelic: Achadh an Dùnaidh
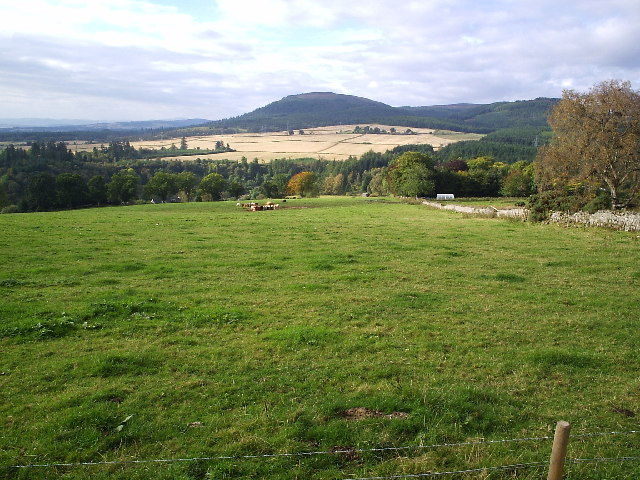
- Near Achandunie

- Location within the Ross and Cromarty area
- OS grid reference: NH591671
- Council area: Highland
- Country: Scotland
- Sovereign state: United Kingdom
- Postcode district: IV
- Police: Scotland
- Fire: Scottish
- Ambulance: Scottish
- UK Parliament: Caithness, Sutherland and Easter Ross
- Scottish Parliament: Caithness, Sutherland and Ross

Achandunie (Scottish Gaelic: Achadh an Dùnaidh) is a village north of Alness in Ross-shire in the Scottish council area of the Highland. The village lies on the B9176 road to the north of Alness.
