= Back of Keppoch =

Coordinates: 56.92424°N 5.85668°W

Back of Keppoch: Scottish Gaelic: Cùl na Ceapaich
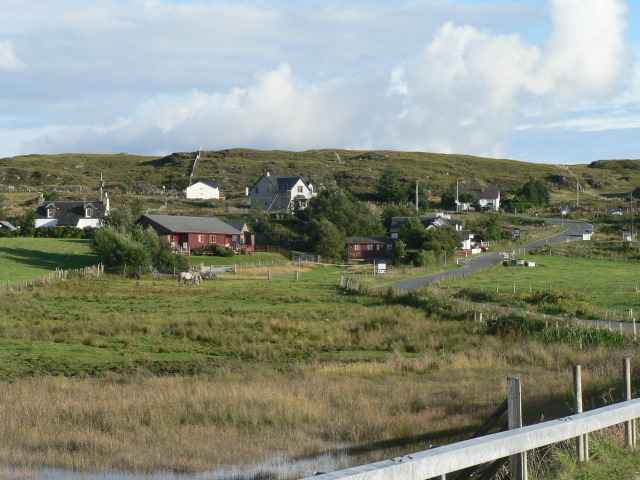
- Back of Keppoch

- Location within the Lochaber area
- OS grid reference: NM654880
- Council area: Highland
- Country: Scotland
- Sovereign state: United Kingdom
- Post town: ARISAIG
- Postcode district: PH39
- Police: Scotland
- Fire: Scottish
- Ambulance: Scottish

Back of Keppoch (Gaelic: Cùl na Ceapaich) is a small coastal settlement in the northwest Scottish Highlands, 40 miles (65 kilometres) west of Fort William near to the A830 road to Mallaig.

The Back of Keppoch is north of Arisaig and south of Morar. Most of the houses on this road are crofts and their land is used as campsites in the summer months. A number of beaches line the road.
