= Allanfearn =

Coordinates: 57.49883°N 4.14307°W

Allanfearn: Scottish Gaelic: An t-Àilean Feàrna
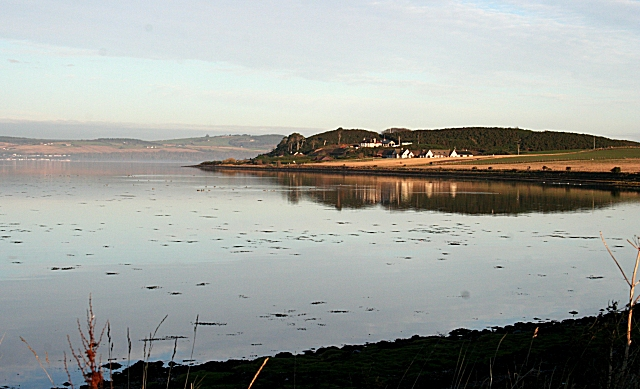
- Brecknish from Allanfearn Reflections in the Beauly Firth on Christmas morning. The picturesque siting of the houses conceals a sand and gravel pit on Alturlie Point beyond them.

- Location within the Inverness area
- OS grid reference: NH716474
- Council area: Highland
- Country: Scotland
- Sovereign state: United Kingdom
- Postcode district: IV2 7
- Police: Scotland
- Fire: Scottish
- Ambulance: Scottish
- UK Parliament: Inverness, Skye and West Ross-shire
- Scottish Parliament: Inverness and Nairn

Allanfearn (/ˌælənˈfɜːrn/, Scottish Gaelic: An t-Àilean Feàrna) is a small settlement, it lies 4 miles (6.4 km) east of Inverness, Inverness-shire, Scotland, within the Scottish council area of Highland.

== Agriculture and tourism ==
The village is located beside the Moray Firth with most of the fields now being used for hay making or grazing for cattle. The hamlet of Alturlie Point was once a fishing village with nine cottages which would have been the former homes of the salmon fishermen.
