= Morefield =

Coordinates: 57.911169°N 5.18068°W

Morefield: Scottish Gaelic: A Mhór-choille
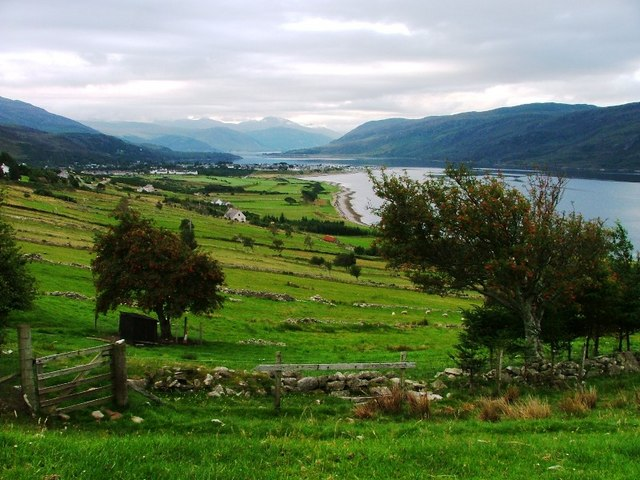

- Location within the Ross and Cromarty area
- OS grid reference: NH116639
- Council area: Highland
- Country: Scotland
- Sovereign state: United Kingdom
- Postcode district: IV26
- Police: Scotland
- Fire: Scottish
- Ambulance: Scottish

Morefield (A' Mhór-choille in Gaelic) is a small hamlet, lying on the northern shore of Loch Broom, 2 miles to the north of Ullapool and south of Rhue in Ross and Cromarty, and is in the Scottish council area of Highland Scotland.

In some early documents it is written as Morchyle.

== Etymology ==
The English name is a corruption of the Gaelic meaning "the big wood".
