= Achnabat =

Coordinates: 57.3383°N 4.3071°W

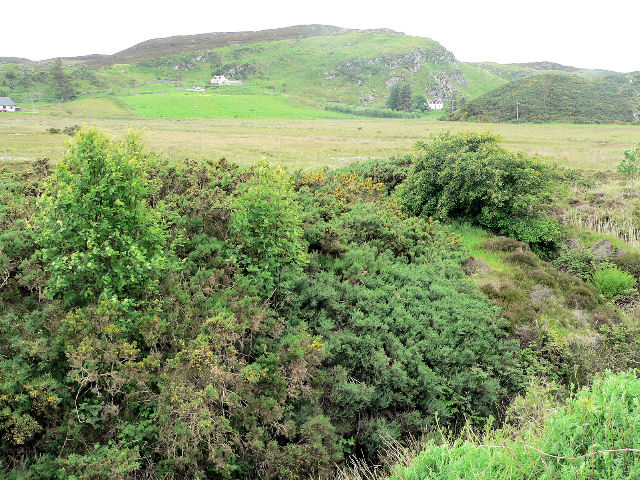
- Achnabat

- Location within the Inverness area
- OS grid reference: NH612298
- Council area: Highland
- Lieutenancy area: Inverness
- Country: Scotland
- Sovereign state: United Kingdom
- Postcode district: IV2 6
- Police: Scotland
- Fire: Scottish
- Ambulance: Scottish
- UK Parliament: Inverness, Skye and West Ross-shire
- Scottish Parliament: Skye, Lochaber and Badenoch

Achnabat, also known as Achnambat, is a small crofting settlement, on the B862, in Inverness-shire, Scotland, within the Scottish council area of Highland.
