= Camas Luinie =

Hamlet in Lochalsh, Scottish Highlands

Coordinates: 57.30002°N 5.40793°W

Camas Luinie: Scottish Gaelic: Camas Luinge
- Location within the Ross and Cromarty area
- OS grid reference: NG947284
- Council area: Highland
- Country: Scotland
- Sovereign state: United Kingdom
- Post town: Kyle
- Postcode district: IV40 8
- Police: Scotland
- Fire: Scottish
- Ambulance: Scottish

Camas Luinie (Scottish Gaelic: Camas Luinge) is a hamlet in Lochalsh, Scottish Highlands and is in the council area of Highland. It is the start of the walk to the impressive Falls of Glomach via Glen Elchaig.
