= Taagan =

Coordinates: 57°37′17″N 5°19′35″W

Taagan (Scottish Gaelic: Na Tathagan) is a hamlet in Ross and Cromarty, in the Highland council area of Scotland. It is situated about 2 km north west of Kinlochewe, at the south east end of Loch Maree, next to the A832 road. It is the location of a small, basic campsite, operated by Scottish Natural Heritage.

The name 'Taagan' comes from the Norse for "the in-fields".
