= Ankerville =

Coordinates: 57.74131°N 3.9906°W

Ankerville: Scottish Gaelic: Cinn Dèis Bhig
- Location within the Highland council area
- OS grid reference: NH815741
- Council area: Highland
- Country: Scotland
- Sovereign state: United Kingdom
- Postcode district: IV19 1
- Police: Scotland
- Fire: Scottish
- Ambulance: Scottish
- UK Parliament: Caithness, Sutherland and Easter Ross
- Scottish Parliament: Caithness, Sutherland and Ross

Ankerville (Scottish Gaelic: Cinn Dèis Bhig) is a village located in Nigg, Ross-shire, Scotland, within the Scottish council area of Highland.
