= Kensaleyre =

Coordinates: 57.47998°N 6.30102°W

Kensaleyre: Scottish Gaelic: Ceann Sàil Eighre
- Location within the Isle of Skye
- OS grid reference: NG422514
- Council area: Highland
- Country: Scotland
- Sovereign state: United Kingdom
- Post town: Snizort
- Postcode district: IV51 9
- Police: Scotland
- Fire: Scottish
- Ambulance: Scottish
- UK Parliament: Ross, Skye and Lochaber
- Scottish Parliament: Skye, Lochaber and Badenoch

Kensaleyre (Scottish Gaelic: Ceann Sàil Eighre) is a scattered crofting township, part of a group of settlements clustered around the A87 road on the shore of Loch Snizort Beag on the Trotternish peninsula of the island of Skye in the Highlands and Islands of Scotland. It is in the council area of Highland. The nearest major settlement is Uig.
