= An Ard =

Coordinates: 57.71195°N 5.68264°W

- Location within the Highland council area
- OS grid reference: NH622360
- Council area: Highland
- Country: Scotland
- Sovereign state: United Kingdom
- Postcode district: IV2 6
- Police: Scotland
- Fire: Scottish
- Ambulance: Scottish
- UK Parliament: Ross, Skye and Lochaber
- Scottish Parliament: Caithness, Sutherland and Ross

An Ard (Scottish Gaelic: ) is a collection of small settlements on the A832 road, close to Charlestown, in Gairloch, Ross-shire, on the east shore of Gair Loch and is within the council of Highland, Scotland.
