= Balnafoich =

Coordinates: 57.39416°N 4.18452°W

Balnafoich: Scottish Gaelic: Baile na Faich
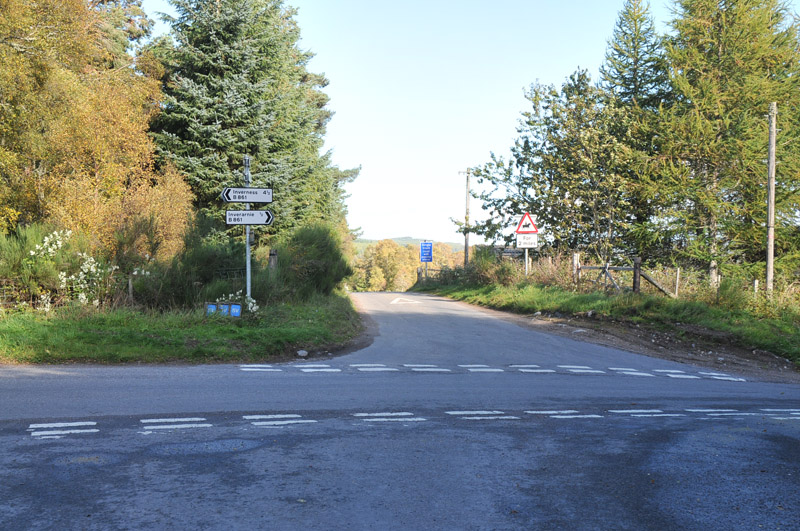

- Location within the Inverness area
- OS grid reference: NH688358
- Council area: Highland
- Country: Scotland
- Sovereign state: United Kingdom
- Post town: Farr
- Postcode district: IV2 6
- Police: Scotland
- Fire: Scottish
- Ambulance: Scottish

Balnafoich (Scottish Gaelic: Baile na Faich meaning Township of the Green Field) was once only a small croft, but is now a little settlement lying 7 miles south of Inverness, in Inverness-shire, Scottish Highlands and is in the Scottish council area of Highland.

Balnafoich lies on the River Nairn.
