= Drynoch =

Coordinates: 57.302°N 6.307°W

Drynoch: Scottish Gaelic: An Droighneach
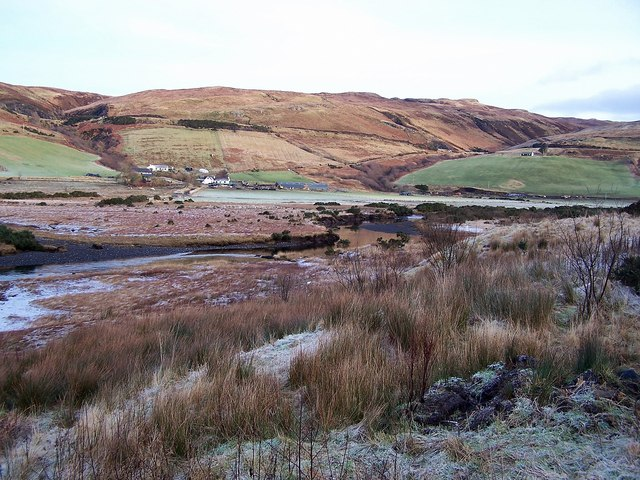
- Drynoch

- Location within the Isle of Skye
- OS grid reference: NG411313
- Council area: Highland
- Country: Scotland
- Sovereign state: United Kingdom
- Postcode district: IV47
- Police: Scotland
- Fire: Scottish
- Ambulance: Scottish

Drynoch (Scottish Gaelic: An Droighneach) is a settlement on the south east tip of Loch Harport on the west coast of Skye in the Highlands of Scotland. It is in the Scottish council area of Highland.

The River Drynoch runs through the village, flowing down from Glen Drynoch into the loch.

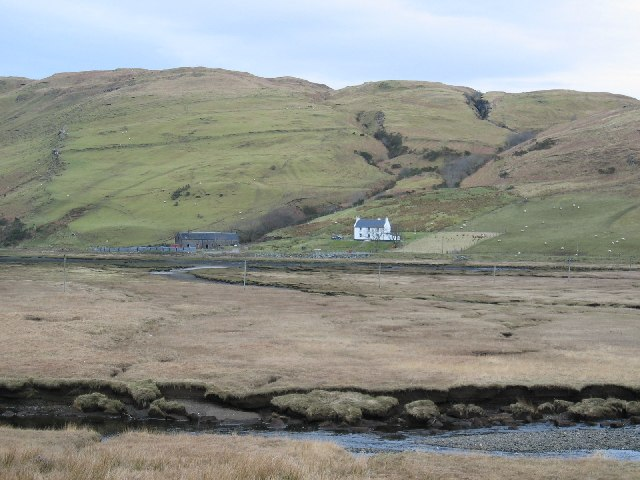
Salt marsh at Drynoch
