= Gorthleck =

Hamlet in Inverness-shire, Scotland

Coordinates: 57.24806°N 4.39977°W

Gorthleck: Scottish Gaelic: Goirtlig
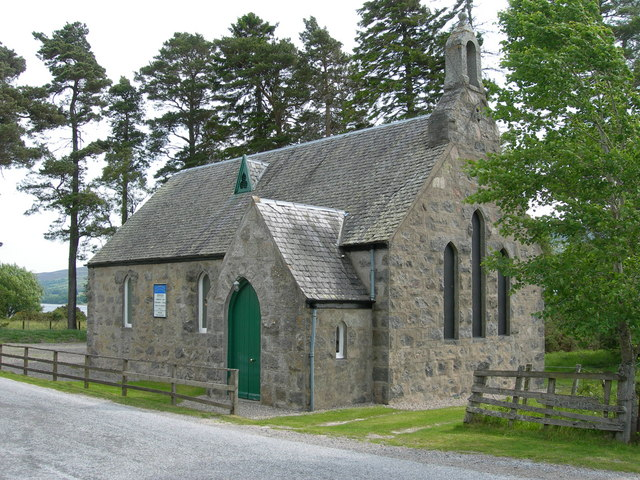
- Free Church of Scotland kirk at Gorthleck

- Location within the Inverness area
- OS grid reference: NH553200
- Council area: Highland
- Country: Scotland
- Sovereign state: United Kingdom
- Postcode district: IV2 6
- Police: Scotland
- Fire: Scottish
- Ambulance: Scottish

Gorthleck (Scottish Gaelic: Goirtlig) is a small hamlet on the north shore Loch Mhòr in Inverness-shire, Scottish Highlands and is in the Scottish council area of Highland. The Gorthleck hamlet encompasses the village of Lyne of Gorthleck, and Gorthleck House, where it was rumoured that Bonny Prince Charlie stayed after the Battle of Culloden and had to flee after seeing Redcoats appear, from an upstairs window.
