= Tulloch, Badenoch and Strathspey =

Coordinates: 57.22736°N 3.68954°W

Tulloch
- Location within the Badenoch and Strathspey area
- OS grid reference: NH980164
- Council area: Highland
- Country: Scotland
- Sovereign state: United Kingdom
- Postcode district: PH25 3
- Police: Scotland
- Fire: Scottish
- Ambulance: Scottish
- UK Parliament: Moray West, Nairn and Strathspey
- Scottish Parliament: Skye, Lochaber and Badenoch

Tulloch is a settlement one mile south of Loch Garten in Badenoch and Strathspey, Highland, Scotland.
