= Ardchronie =

Coordinates: 57.8665°N 4.3351°W

Ardchronie: Scottish Gaelic: Àird Chrònaidh
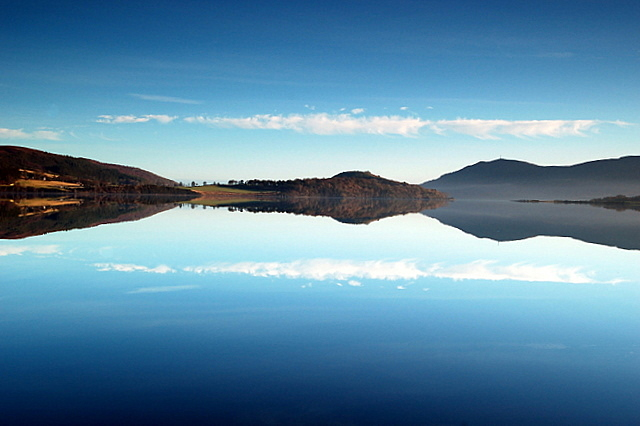
- Christmas Day 2008 Dornoch Firth taken at Ardchronie.

- Location within the Sutherland area
- OS grid reference: NH6188
- Council area: Highland
- Country: Scotland
- Sovereign state: United Kingdom
- Postcode district: IV24 3
- Police: Scotland
- Fire: Scottish
- Ambulance: Scottish
- UK Parliament: Caithness, Sutherland and Easter Ross
- Scottish Parliament: Caithness, Sutherland and Ross

Ardchronie (Scottish Gaelic: Àird Chrònaidh) is a hamlet in the Highland Council area of Scotland. It lies on the south side of the Dornoch Firth, about 2 miles south of Bonar Bridge. Upper Ardchronie is on the hill above Ardchronie.
