= Druimarben =

Coordinates: 56.78936°N 5.14731°W

Druimarben: Scottish Gaelic: Druim Earbainn
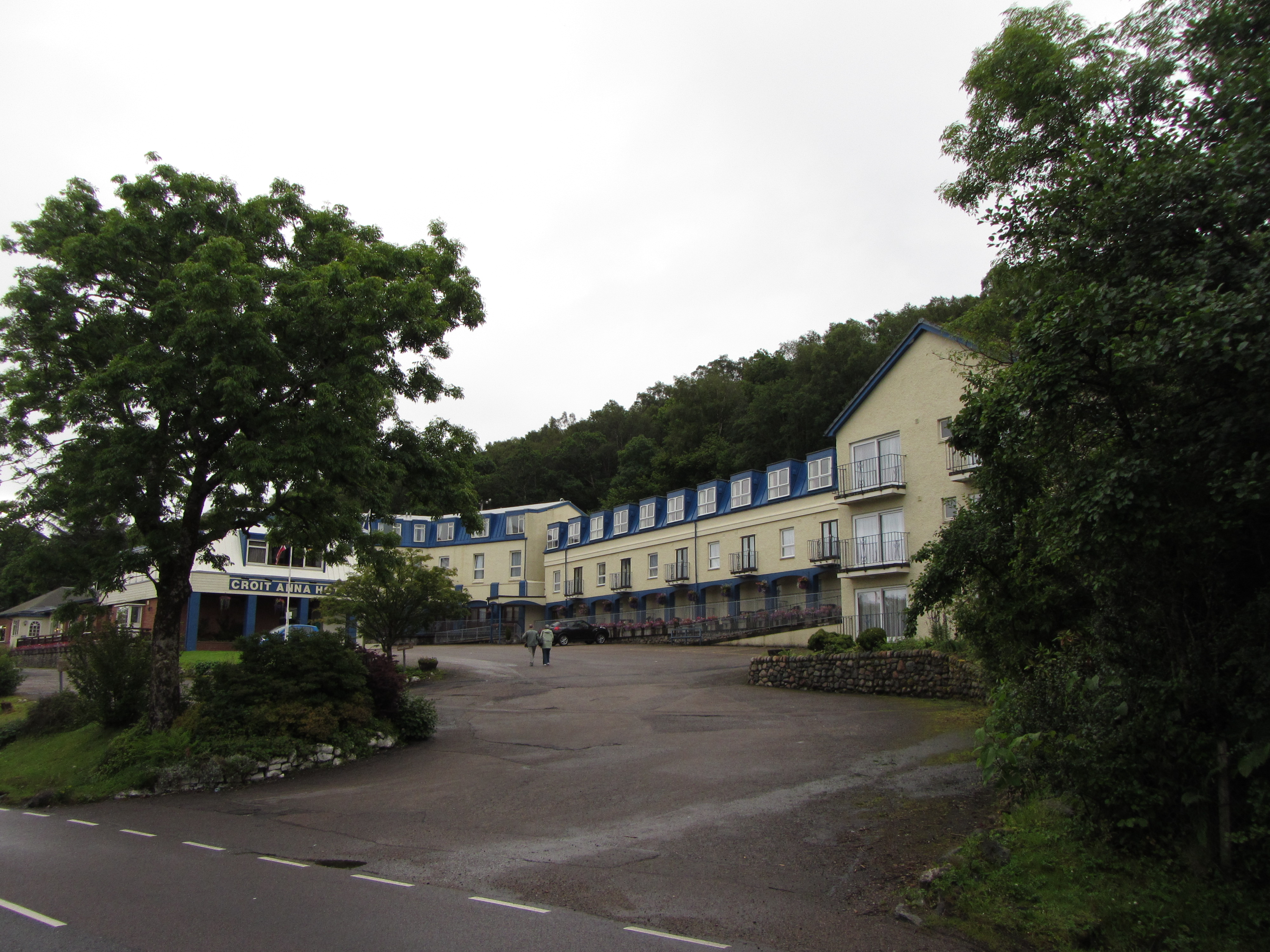

- Location within the Lochaber area
- OS grid reference: NN078708
- Council area: Highland
- Country: Scotland
- Sovereign state: United Kingdom
- Post town: Fort William
- Postcode district: PH33 6
- Police: Scotland
- Fire: Scottish
- Ambulance: Scottish

Druimarben (Scottish Gaelic: Druim Earbainn) is a hamlet on the east shore of Loch Linnhe in Inverness-shire, Scottish Highlands and is in the Scottish council area of Highland.

Druimarben lies two miles (three kilometres) south of Fort William on the A82 road.
