= Achnahanat =

Coordinates: 57.9479°N 4.5129°W

Achnahanat: Scottish Gaelic: Achadh na h-Annaid
- Location within the Sutherland area
- OS grid reference: NH511981
- Council area: Highland
- Country: Scotland
- Sovereign state: United Kingdom
- Postcode district: IV24 3
- Police: Scotland
- Fire: Scottish
- Ambulance: Scottish
- UK Parliament: Caithness, Sutherland and Easter Ross
- Scottish Parliament: Caithness, Sutherland and Ross

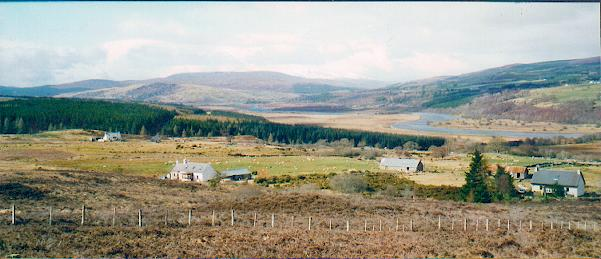
Looking over Achnahanat to the Kyle of Sutherland

Achnahanat (Scottish Gaelic: Achadh na h-Annaid) is a crofting settlement on the south side of the Kyle of Sutherland in Scotland. It is about 4 miles (6 kilometres) west of Invershin in Sutherland, within the Scottish council area of Highland.
