= Muir of Allangrange =

Coordinates: 57.53615°N 4.40827°W

- Location within the Ross and Cromarty area
- OS grid reference: NH559521
- Council area: Highland
- Country: Scotland
- Sovereign state: United Kingdom
- Post town: Muir of Ord
- Postcode district: IV6 7
- Police: Scotland
- Fire: Scottish
- Ambulance: Scottish

Muir of Allangrange is a scattered crofting township, lying 3 miles northeast of Muir of Ord on the western side of the Black Isle, in Ross-shire, Scottish Highlands and is in the Scottish council area of Highland.
