= Lubcroy =

Coordinates: 57.9756°N 4.7819°W

Lubcroy: Scottish Gaelic: An Lùb Chruaidh
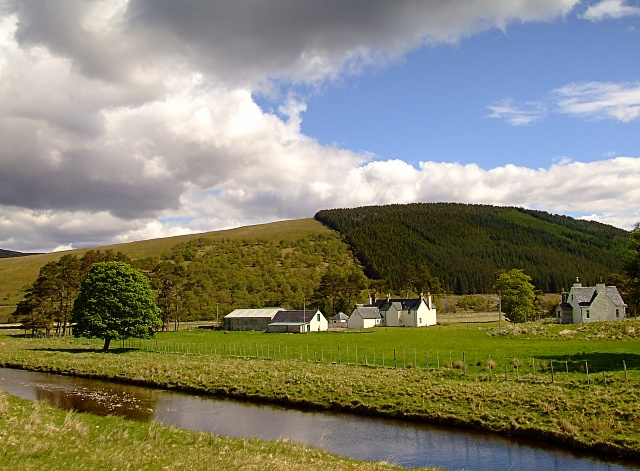
- River Conacher in Lubcroy

- Location within the Sutherland area
- OS grid reference: NC356019
- Council area: Highland
- Country: Scotland
- Sovereign state: United Kingdom
- Post town: Lairg
- Postcode district: IV27 4
- Police: Scotland
- Fire: Scottish
- Ambulance: Scottish

Lubcroy is a lodge in Glen Oykel, in Sutherland, Scottish Highlands and is in the Scottish council area of Highland.

It lies in the civil parish of Kincardine and Community council or Ardgay and District.

The A837 road passes through Lubcroy, running between Inveran and Lochinver.
