= Inchree =

Coordinates: 56.72827°N 5.22214°W

Inchree: Scottish Gaelic: Innis an Ruighe; Scots: Inchrigh
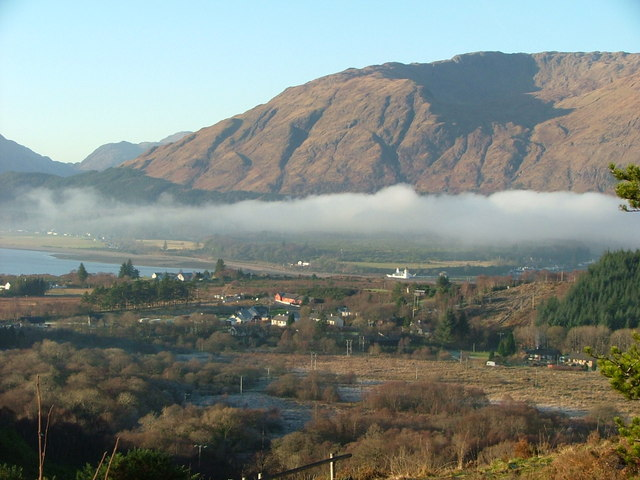
- Inchree

- Location within the Lochaber area
- OS grid reference: NN029642
- Council area: Highland
- Country: Scotland
- Sovereign state: United Kingdom
- Post town: Fort William
- Postcode district: PH33 6
- Dialling code: 01855
- Police: Scotland
- Fire: Scottish
- Ambulance: Scottish

Inchree (Scottish Gaelic: Innis an Ruighe) is a small hamlet, situated at the northern end of the village of Onich. It is 7 miles south of the town of Fort William, in Inverness-shire, Scottish Highlands and is in the Scottish council area of Highland. Inchree is located 200 metres off the A82 main road, and is also 500 metres south of the Corran Ferry terminal.

Glenrigh Forest, behind Inchree, has a network of walking paths and trails, where panoramic views overlooking Loch Linnhe and the Morven Mountains can be enjoyed. The Inchree Waterfalls, which drop several hundred feet in a series of steps, can be reached within 10 minutes on foot from the car park.

The viewpoints on the waterfall path look in a south-west direction down Loch Linnhe, and offer photographic opportunities for shooting the sunsets that occur frequently.
