= Achnasaul =

Coordinates: 56.95794°N 5.03557°W

Achnasaul: Scottish Gaelic: Achadh nan Sabhal
- Location within the Lochaber area
- Population: 0
- OS grid reference: NN155892
- Council area: Highland
- Country: Scotland
- Sovereign state: United Kingdom
- Post town: Achnacarry
- Postcode district: PH34 4
- Police: Scotland
- Fire: Scottish
- Ambulance: Scottish
- UK Parliament: Ross, Skye and Lochaber
- Scottish Parliament: Skye, Lochaber and Badenoch

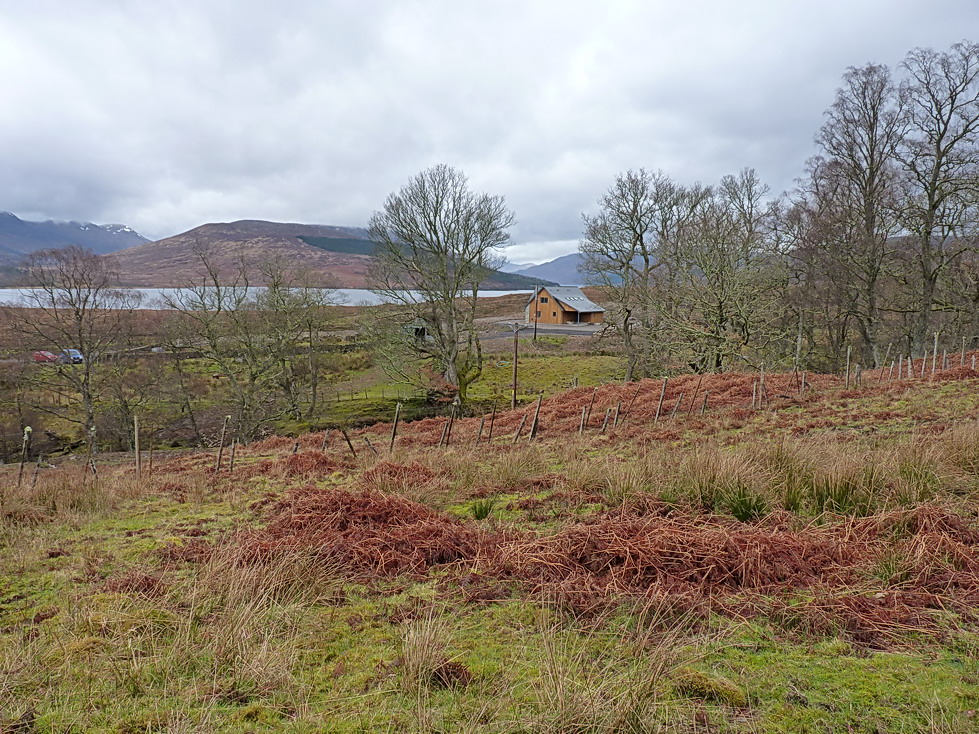
Farm building at Achnasaul

Achnasaul (Scottish Gaelic: Achadh nan Sabhal) is a village, located on the shores of Loch Arkaig, close to Spean Bridge, Inverness-shire, Scotland, within the Scottish council area of Highland.
