= Rhue, Scotland =

Coordinates: 57.92358°N 5.21057°W

Rhue: Scottish Gaelic: An Rubha
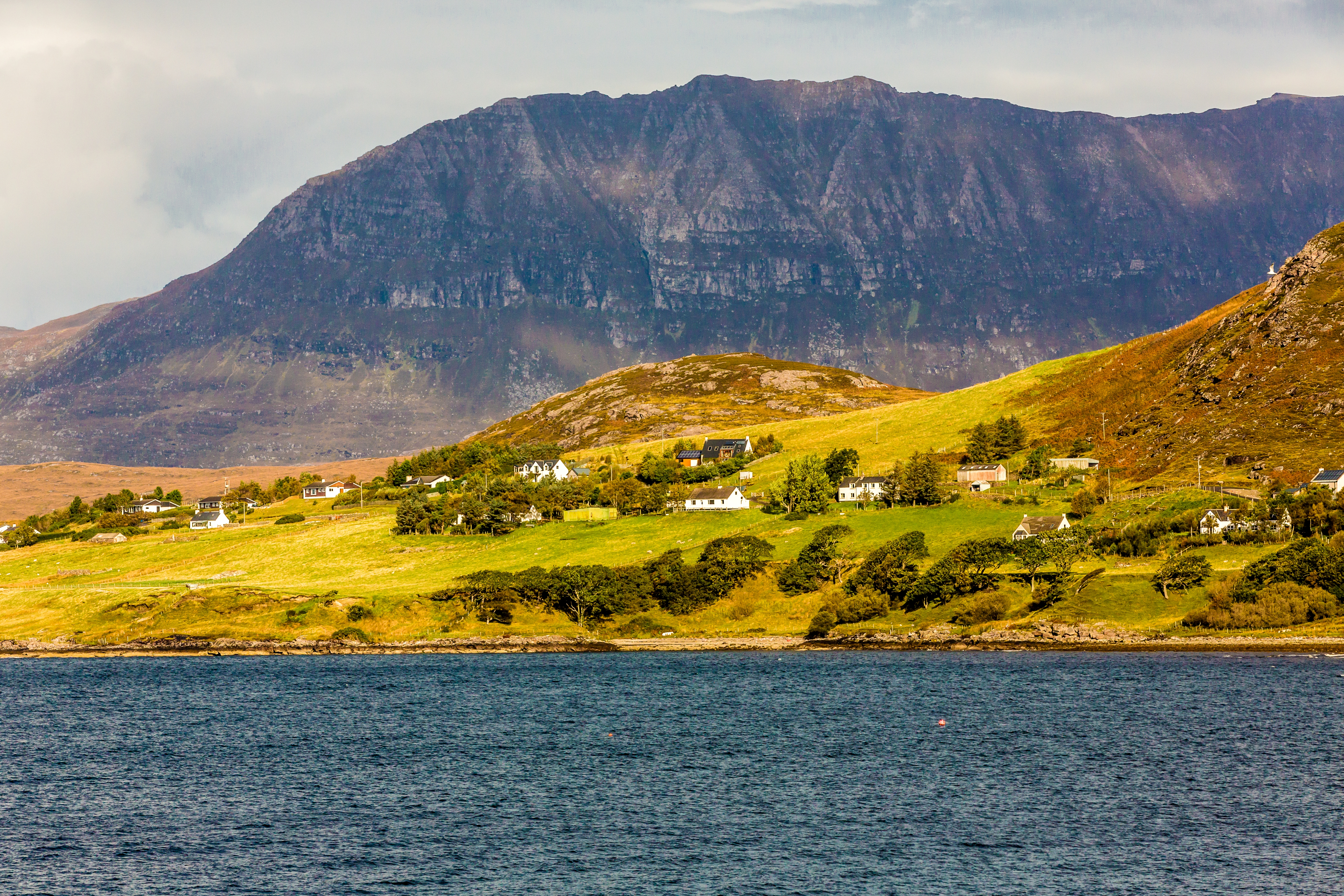

- Location within the Highland council area
- OS grid reference: NH099972
- Council area: Highland
- Country: Scotland
- Sovereign state: United Kingdom
- Post town: Ullapool
- Postcode district: IV26 2
- Police: Scotland
- Fire: Scottish
- Ambulance: Scottish

Rhue (An Rubha in Gaelic) is a hamlet near Ullapool in Ross and Cromarty, and is in the Scottish council area of Highland, Scotland.

== Etymology ==
Rhue derives from An Rubha which means "headland" in Gaelic. The full name of the area is "RudhaCadail" which in Gaelic means "the Point (ie headland) of the Sleepy People". Legend has it that the name came from sailors found asleep but quite unharmed on the rocks (where the lighthouse is now) after their boat was shipwrecked on a stormy night. The settlement is shown on earlier maps as "Ard-a-chadail", the 'village' of the sleepy people.
