= Duirinish, Skye =

Peninsula on the Isle of Skye, Scotland

Coordinates: 57.44°N 6.65°W

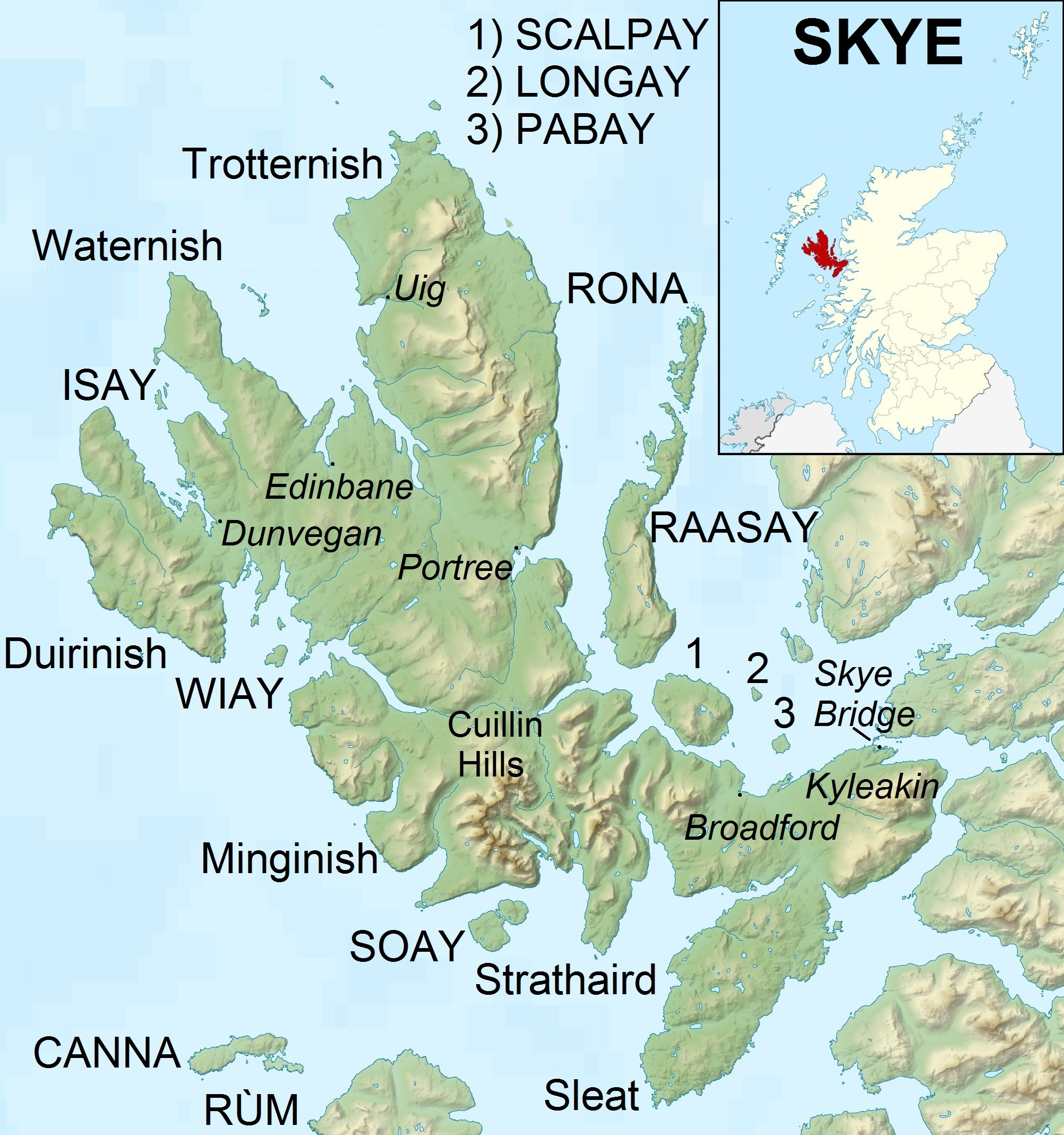
Map of Skye showing Duirinish

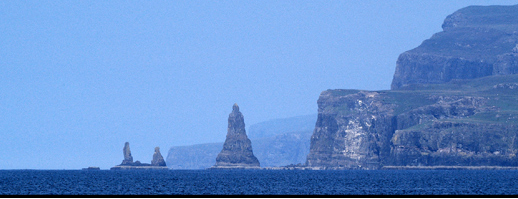
Macleod's Maidens

Duirinish (Scottish Gaelic: Diùirinis) is a peninsula and civil parish on the island of Skye in Scotland. It is situated in the north west between Loch Dunvegan and Loch Bracadale.

== Geography ==
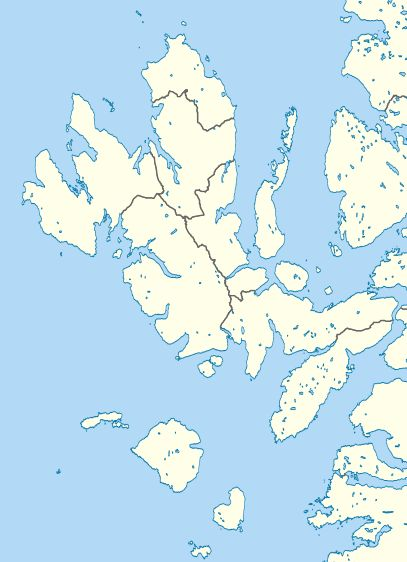

Skye's shape defies description: W. H. Murray wrote that "Skye is sixty miles [100 km] long, but what might be its breadth is beyond the ingenuity of man to state". Malcolm Slesser suggested that its shape "sticks out of the west coast of northern Scotland like a lobster's claw ready to snap at the fish bone of Harris and Lewis", which would make Duirinish one of the claws.

The peninsula's main peaks are Healabhal Mhòr and Healabhal Bheag, which reach 469 metres (1,539 feet) and 488 metres (1,601 feet) respectively, and are better known as MacLeod's Tables. They lie in the centre of the peninsula and their distinctive shapes are visible throughout much of north west Skye. Dunvegan Head marks the north end of the peninsula and Idrigill Point the south.

The west coast is now uninhabited and offshore there are only a few small islets: An Dubh Sgeir, An Stac and MacLeod's Maidens. The latter are three stacks that resemble statues and were named after the drowning of a MacLeod chieftain's wife and two daughters.

There are a number of small settlements principally along the west coast of Loch Dunvegan, including Borreraig (home of the piping MacCrimmons), Colbost with its Three Chimneys restaurant, Skinidin, Galtrigill and Totaig. Lephin and Glendale are further west. The latter is a substantial community-owned estate, and its "martyrs" played an important part in the Highland Clearances. Orbost and Roag are further south on the shore of Loch Bracadale. Crofting remains a mainstay of the economy.

The village of Dunvegan itself is the main settlement of the area and is located on the east shore of the loch just outside Duirinish. Nearby is Dunvegan Castle, which has been the seat of Clan MacLeod since 1200.

Historically, Duirinish was also a parish in the county of Inverness-shire. The parish was larger than the peninsula and included Vaternish and Edinbane. The township of Edinbane was planned by Kenneth MacLeod. The centrepiece of the village is the imposing 15th century Edinbane Lodge.

== Etymology ==
The Gaelic name Diùranais or Diùirinis means "deer headland" and is derived from the Old Norse dyr (deer) and "ness" (headland). The peninsula is also known as dùthaich nam mogan, meaning "land of the mogan shoes", and the inhabitants as moganaich.

== See also ==
- Minginish
- Sleat
- Strathaird
- Trotternish
- Waternish
