= Ascrib Islands =

Island group off Skye, Scotland

Coordinates: 57.58981°N 6.51143°W

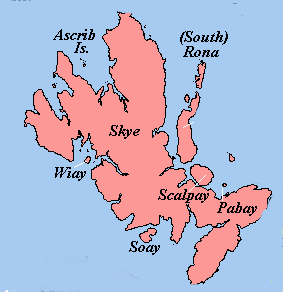
Ascrib Islands relative to Skye

The Ascrib Islands are a group of small uninhabited islands off the northwest coast of the Isle of Skye, in the Highland council area of Scotland. They are in Loch Snizort, between the Trotternish and Waternish peninsulas.

The islands include:

- South Ascrib
- Eilean Garave
- Eilean Creagach
- Eilean Iosal
- Sgeir a' Chapuill
- Sgeir a' Chuain
- Scalp Rock

There are also a number of smaller skerries. There is a house on South Ascrib, the largest of the islands.

Together with Isay and Loch Dunvegan, they are designated as a Special Area of Conservation owing to the breeding colonies of the common seal.

== See also ==
- List of islands of Scotland
