= Geary, Skye =

Coordinates: 57.568073°N 6.576104°W

Geary: Scottish Gaelic: Geàrraidh
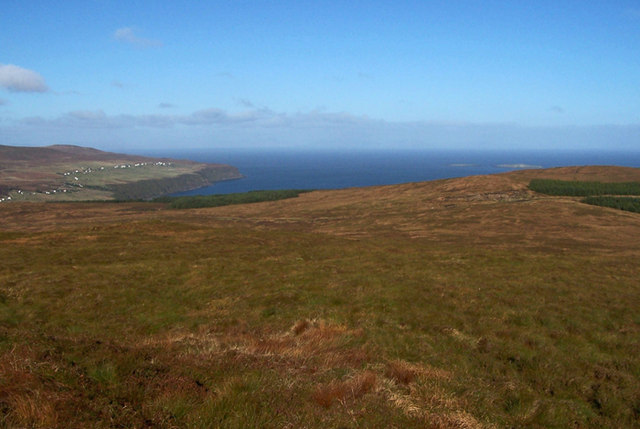
- Northern slope of Beinn Charnach Bheag Looking down the largely featureless boggy slope from the summit of the hill. The buildings on the left are the township of Geary.

- Location within the Isle of Skye
- OS grid reference: NG264623
- Council area: Highland
- Country: Scotland
- Sovereign state: United Kingdom
- Post town: Hallin
- Postcode district: IV55
- Police: Scotland
- Fire: Scottish
- Ambulance: Scottish

Geary is a small crofting township, of some 40 houses, located on the remote northeast coast of the Waternish peninsula, overlooking the sea loch Loch Snizort, on the island of Skye, Scotland. It is in the Scottish council area of Highland.

It is adjacent to Gillen and Knockbreck with Halistra about one mile (two kilometres) further west along a single-track road.
