= Galtrigill =

Coordinates: 57.48816°N 6.69614°W

Galltrigill: Scottish Gaelic: Galtraigil
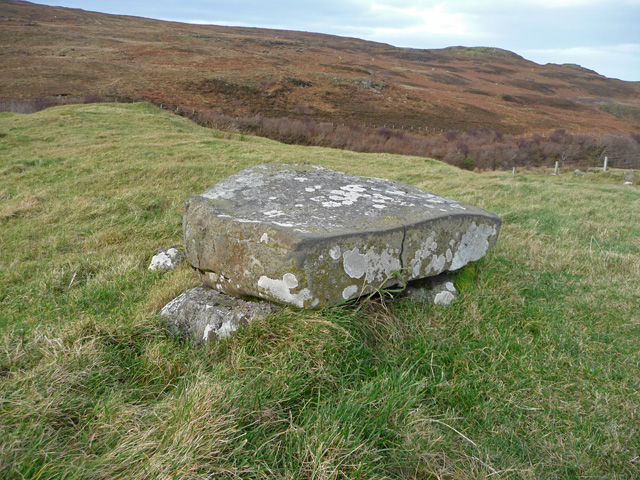
- The Manners Stone is marked as such on the OS map. It sits in a field near the end of the surfaced road at Galtrigill. Once there was a big village here. Now there is just a scattering of ruins.

- Location within the Isle of Skye
- OS grid reference: NG186539
- Council area: Highland
- Country: Scotland
- Sovereign state: United Kingdom
- Post town: Dunvegan
- Postcode district: IV55 8
- Police: Scotland
- Fire: Scottish
- Ambulance: Scottish

Galtrigill (Scottish Gaelic: Galtraigil) is a largely abandoned crofting township on the far north end of the east side of the Duirinish peninsula on the Isle of Skye, and is in the Scottish council area of Highland.

The villages of Borreraig, Uig and Totaig are located directly south. The Stone of Manners (Scottish Gaelic: Clach a Mhodha) lies north of Galtrigill, and is the only one known to exist on the Isle of Skye.

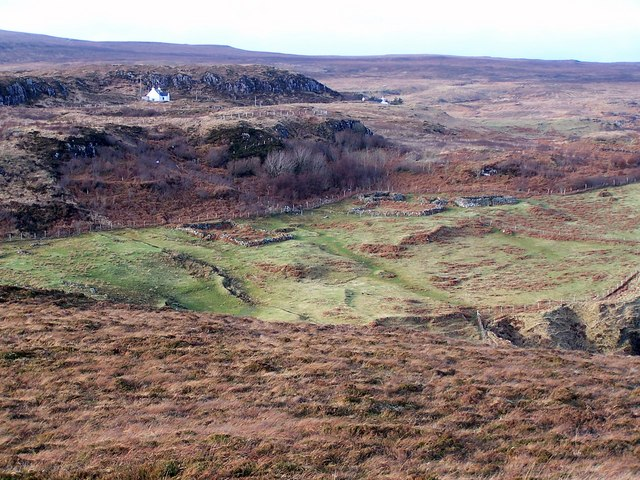
Ruined settlement south of Galltrigill
