= Claigan =

Settlement on the Isle of Skye, Scotland

Coordinates: 57.48562°N 6.60983°W

Claigan: Scottish Gaelic: An Claigeann
- Location within the Isle of Skye
- OS grid reference: NG238533
- Council area: Highland
- Country: Scotland
- Sovereign state: United Kingdom
- Postcode district: IV55 8
- Police: Scotland
- Fire: Scottish
- Ambulance: Scottish

Claigan (Scottish Gaelic: An Claigeann) is a small coastal settlement on the north east shore of the sea loch, Loch Dunvegan, on the Waternish peninsula, in north western Isle of Skye, Scottish Highlands and is in the Scottish council area of Highland. The village of Dunvegan lies approximately 4 miles (6 kilometres) southeast, at the base of the loch.
