= Mingay =

Islet of the Inner Hebrides, Scotland

Coordinates: 57°31′27″N 6°38′20″W

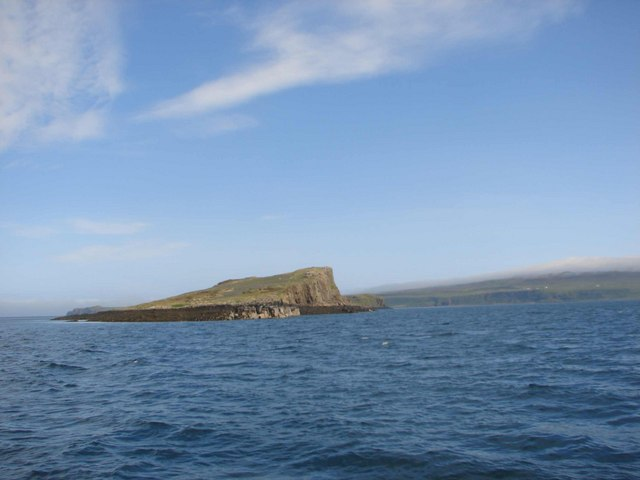

Location
- Mingay shown within Highland
- OS grid reference: NG2230357686

Name
- Name meaning: rock

Physical geography
- Island group: Skye
- Highest elevation: 32m

Administration
- Council area: Highland
- Country: Scotland
- Sovereign state: United Kingdom

Mingay is an islet in the Inner Hebrides off Skye and Isay. It is in the council area of Highland, Scotland

Together with Isay and Loch Dunvegan, it is designated as a Special Area of Conservation owing to the breeding colonies of the common seal.

== Geography and geology ==
The island's rock is basaltic lava with shale and quartzite.

Mingay is in eastern part of Loch Dunvegan. It is due south of Ardmore Point and west of Waternish, both on Skye. It also looks south to the Skye mountain Beinn Bhreac, and to the south east, Sgeir nam Biast.

== History ==
The island's name is Old Norse in origin, which is in turn the origin of many of the placenames on nearby Skye, as well as the name of Isay, and the neighbouring Clett (Scottish Gaelic: Cleit from Old Norse klettr, meaning a rock.)

== See also ==
- List of islands of Scotland
