= Isay =

Island of the Inner Hebrides, Scotland

Ìosaigh (Gaelic)
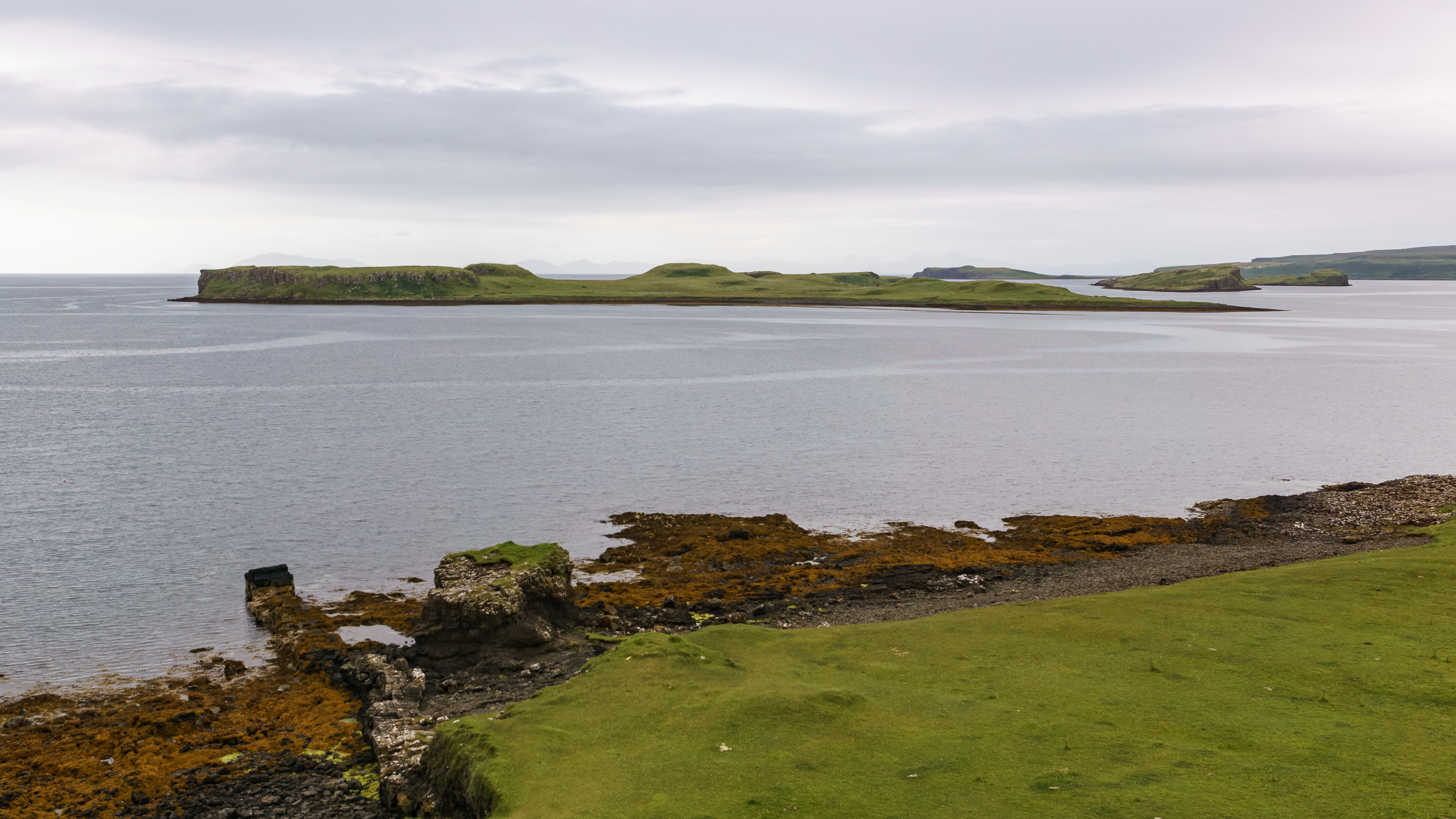
- Isay from the coral beaches on Skye

Location
- Isay shown within Highland Scotland
- OS grid reference: NG218570
- Coordinates: 57.52°N 6.65°W

Name
- Gaelic pronunciation: [ˈiəs̪aj]
- Name meaning: "porpoise island"
- Old Norse name: isa-ey

Physical geography
- Island group: Isle of Skye
- Area: 60 ha (1/4 sq mi)
- Area rank: 182
- Highest elevation: 28 m (92 ft)

Administration
- Council area: Highland
- Country: Scotland
- Sovereign state: United Kingdom

Demographics
- Population: 0

Isay (Scottish Gaelic: Ìosaigh) is an uninhabited island in the Inner Hebrides of the west coast of Scotland. It lies in Loch Dunvegan, 1 kilometre (1,100 yd) off the northwest coast of the Isle of Skye. Two smaller isles of Mingay and Clett lie nearby. The name originated from the Old Norse ise-øy meaning porpoise island. The island of Lampay is due south. The area of Isay is 60 hectares (150 acres).

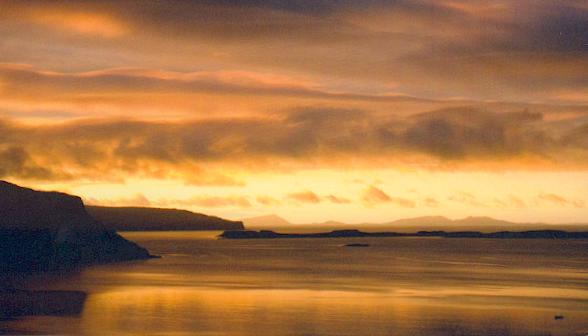
An October sunset over Isay, with the Outer Hebrides in the distance.

== History ==
The first recorded owner of Isay and its surrounding islets was Olaf the Black, the 13th-century ruler of the Kingdom of the Isles.

In the 16th century, the main house on the island was inhabited by the MacLeods of Lewis, and it was here that Roderick Macleod of Lewis ('Nimheach' - the venomous) implemented his plan to ensure that his grandson would inherit Raasay and the lands of Gairloch. He convened the two powerful families (names do not appear to have been recorded) of the time at Isay house for a banquet which he suggested was to inform them of good news. During the feast, he invited each person present to accompany him outside of the banquet hall in order to inform them of this news. Upon leaving the hall, the victim was promptly stabbed to death. In this way, both families were wiped out.

The island was home to a small fishing community in around the 1830s, which included a general store and fishing station, and by 1841 supported 15 families "in considerable comfort". However, like many other small islands, the population of around ninety were removed during the Highland clearances to make way for sheep. The remains of the 18 or more cottages can be clearly seen from the Waternish peninsula, which overlooks the three islands.

The island was briefly owned by the singer Donovan in the 1960s.
