= Lampay =

Uninhabited tidal island near Scotland

Coordinates: 57°30′3″N 6°38′26″W

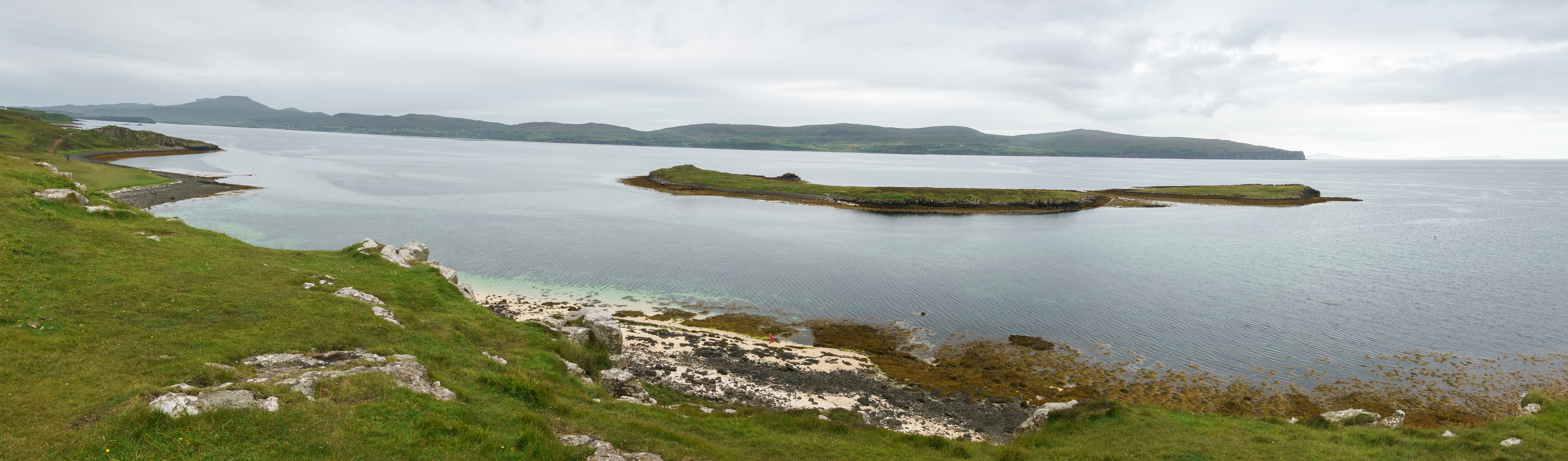
- Lampay from the coral beaches on Skye

Location
- Mingay shown within Highland

Physical geography
- Island group: Skye

Administration
- Council area: Highland
- Country: Scotland
- Sovereign state: United Kingdom

Demographics
- Population: 0

Lampay is an uninhabited tidal island in Loch Dunvegan, off the northwest coast of the Isle of Skye in Scotland.

It is separated from the "mainland" of Skye by a small sound called An Doirneil. It is not far from Claigan. The island doubles in size at low tide, and is really two islands connected by a thin isthmus. It is due south of Isay.

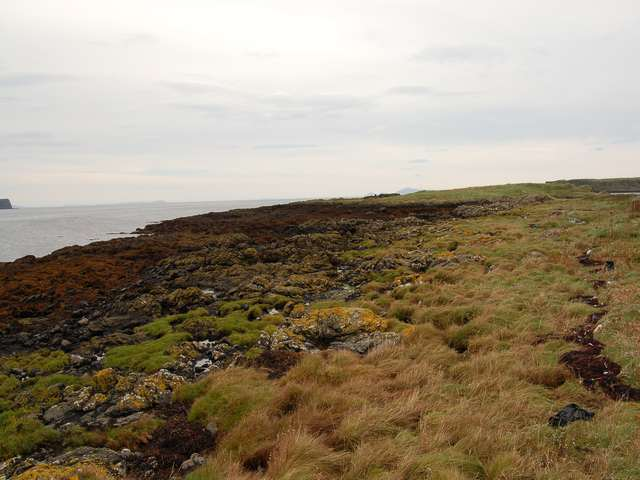
Bogland on Lampay

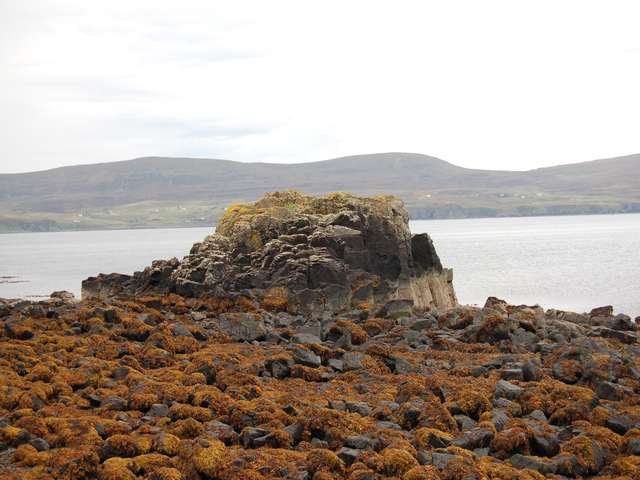
Rocks at the southwest of Lampay
