= List of shipwrecks in November 1826 =

The list of shipwrecks in November 1826 includes some ships sunk, wrecked, or otherwise lost in November 1826.

== 1 November ==
List of shipwrecks: 1 November 1826
Ship	State	Description
Euphemia	United Kingdom	The ship was driven ashore and wrecked at Great Yarmouth, Norfolk. Her crew were rescued. She was on a voyage from Jersey, Channel Islands to Aberdeen.
Thomas	United Kingdom	The ship was lost near the Hole-in-the Wall. She was on a voyage from Liverpool, Lancashire to Havana, Cuba.

== 2 November ==
List of shipwrecks: 2 November 1826
Ship	State	Description
La Blanche	France	The brig was beached on Terceira Island, Azores.
Mars	United Kingdom	The ship was driven ashore at Corton, Suffolk. Her crew were rescued. She was on a voyage from London to Newcastle upon Tyne.
Sally	United Kingdom	The ship was driven ashore at Corton. Her crew were rescued. She was on a voyage from London to Newcastle upon Tyne.
St. Johannes	Sweden	The ship was driven ashore 2 leagues (6 nautical miles (11 km) east of Calais, France. She was on a voyage from Stockholm to Porto, Portugal.

== 3 November ==
List of shipwrecks: 3 November 1826
Ship	State	Description
Amity	United Kingdom	The ship sprang a leak and was beached at Harwich, Essex.
Arabella	Stettin	The ship was driven ashore and wrecked at Dungeness, Kent, United Kingdom. Her crew were rescued. She was on a voyage from Leith, Lothian, United Kingdom to São Miguel Island, Azores.
Collector	(United Kingdom of Great Britain and Ireland) British North America	The ship was wrecked near the mouth of the Magdalen River. She was on a voyage from Halifax, Nova Scotia to Quebec City.
Gleaner	United Kingdom	The ship foundered in the North Sea off the Haisborough Sands, Norfolk with the loss of all hands. She was on a voyage from Newcastle upon Tyne, Northumberland to Great Yarmouth, Norfolk.
John	United Kingdom	The ship was driven ashore at Mundesley, Norfolk. Her crew were rescued. She was on a voyage from North Shields, County Durham to Jersey, Channel Islands.
Jong Jacob	Netherlands	The ship was wrecked on the Haisborough Sands with the loss of her captain. She was on a voyage from Rotterdam, South Holland to Newcastle upon Tyne.
Plutus	United Kingdom	The ship was wrecked on the Haisborough Sands. Her crew were rescued.
Wakefield	United Kingdom	The ship was driven ashore and damaged at Scroby, Norfolk with the loss of her captain. She was on a voyage from Leeds, Yorkshire to London. Wakefield was refloated on 23 November and taken in to Great Yarmouth for repairs.

== 4 November ==
List of shipwrecks: 4 November 1826
Ship	State	Description
Canadian	(United Kingdom of Great Britain and Ireland) British North America	The ship was driven ashore in the Saint Lawrence River at Saint-Vallier, Lower Canada. She was on a voyage from Chatham, Massachusetts to Quebec City, Lower Canada. Canadian was refloated on 14 November and towed in to Quebec City.
Galatea	United States	The ship was driven ashore at the mouth of the Weser. She was on a voyage from Virginia to Bremen.
John	United Kingdom	The ship was driven ashore at Boston, Lincolnshire. She was on a voyage from North Shields, County Durham, to Jersey, Channel Islands.
Neptune	United States	The ship was driven ashore at Rehoboth Beach, Delaware with the loss of two of her crew. She was on a voyage from Rotterdam, South Holland, Netherlands to Philadelphia, Pennsylvania.

== 5 November ==
List of shipwrecks: 5 November 1826
Ship	State	Description
Albion	United Kingdom	The ship was in collision with Edina (United Kingdom) off Cromer, Norfolk and was abandoned. Her crew were rescued by Edina. Albion was on a voyage from Rotterdam, South Holland, Netherlands to Leith, Lothian. She was later discovered off the Neuwarp Lightship ( Trinity House) and taken in to Great Yarmouth.
Dædalus	Bremen	The ship was wrecked on the North Bank, in Liverpool Bay. She was on a voyage from Liverpool, Lancashire, United Kingdom to Bremen.
Grief	Greifswald	The ship was wrecked on the North Bank. She was on a voyage from Liverpool to Greifswald.
Spes Nova	Norway	The ship struck a rock and sank at Christiana. She was on a voyage from London, United Kingdom to Christiana.

== 6 November ==
List of shipwrecks: 6 November 1826
Ship	State	Description
Inger Margaretha	Norway	The ship ran aground at Heligoland and was beached. She was on a voyage from St. Ubes, Portugal to Flekkefjord.
Louisa	United Kingdom	The ship was driven ashore and wrecked at Norden, Kingdom of Hanover. She was on a voyage from Hamburg to Viana do Castelo, Portugal.
Perthshire	United Kingdom	The ship was driven ashore in Widewall Bay, Orkney Islands. She was on a voyage from Wick, Caithness to Cork.

== 7 November ==
List of shipwrecks: 7 November 1826
Ship	State	Description
Cynthia	United Kingdom	The ship ran aground on the Hoyle Bank, in Liverpool Bay. She was on a voyage from Liverpool, Lancashire to Barcelona, Spain. Cynthia was refloated the next day and taken in to the River Mersey.
Henriette	Hamburg	The ship ran aground near Neuwerk. She was on a voyage from Hamburg to Bremen. Henriette was later refloated and taken in to Bremen in a severely damaged condition.
Königsberg	Prussia	The ship was driven ashore near "Helsingfors". She was on a voyage from Pillau to London, United Kingdom. She was refloated on 11 November and resumed her voyage.
Ranger	United Kingdom	The schooner was wrecked on The Brothers, a rock in Kirkandrews Bay with the loss of three of the twelve people on board.
Stadt Wismar	Wismar	The ship was wrecked on Skagen, Denmark. Her crew were rescued. She was on a voyage from Leith, Lothian, United Kingdom to Wismar.
Stair	United Kingdom	The ship was driven ashore at Gillen, Isle of Skye.
Superb	United Kingdom	The ship was driven ashore at Pillau. Her crew were rescued. She was on a voyage from Hull, Yorkshire to Pillau. Superb was refloated on 18 November and taken in to Pillau.
Vulcan	United Kingdom	The ship was wrecked on the Black Rock, off Seal Island, Nova Scotia, British North America. Her crew were rescued. She was on a voyage from Saint John, New Brunswick, British North America to the Clyde.

== 8 November ==
List of shipwrecks: 8 November 1826
Ship	State	Description
Alecta	Spain	The ship was wrecked at Tenerife, Canary Islands.
Belle Gabrielle	France	The ship was wrecked at Tenerife. She was on a voyage from Bordeaux, Gironde to Île Bourbon.
Don Juan	Spain	The ship was wrecked at Tenerife.
John Salmon	United Kingdom	The ship struck the "Point of Perrispa" and foundered. She was on a voyage from Saint Petersburg, Russia to London.
Potomac	United States	The ship was wrecked at Tenerife.

== 9 November ==
List of shipwrecks: 9 November 1826
Ship	State	Description
Azores	United States	The ship was wrecked on Heneaga. She was on a voyage from Aux Cayes, Haiti to New York.
Martha	United Kingdom	The ship was lost off Fogo, Newfoundland. Her crew survived. She was on a voyage from Hamburg to Newfoundland.
Missoura	United States	The ship was wrecked in the Cape Verde Islands, Portugal.

== 10 November ==
List of shipwrecks: 10 November 1826
Ship	State	Description
Bougainville	France	The ship was driven ashore at Marseille, Bouches-du-Rhône. She was on a voyage from Martinique to Marseille.

== 12 November ==
List of shipwrecks: 12 November 1826
Ship	State	Description
Anna Catharina	Hamburg	The ship was driven ashore on Læsø, Denmark. She was on a voyage from Assens, Denmark to Hull, Yorkshire United Kingdom.

== 13 November ==
List of shipwrecks: 13 November 1826
Ship	State	Description
Betsey & Sophia	United Kingdom	The ship was driven ashore on the St. Mawe's Bank, off the coast of Cornwall. She was on a voyage from London to Dominica. Betsey & Sophia was refloated the next day.

== 14 November ==
List of shipwrecks: 14 November 1826
Ship	State	Description
Daphne	United Kingdom	The ship departed from Riga, Russia for Berwick-upon-Tweed, Northumberland. No further trace, presumed foundered with the loss of all hands.
Emelie	Netherlands	The ship was driven ashore at Ostend, West Flanders. She was on a voyage from London, United Kingdom to Ostend.
Fame	United Kingdom	The ship was driven ashore on the Sandwich Flats. She was on a voyage from St. Thomas, Virgin Islands to Bremen. Fame was refloated the next day and taken in to Ramsgate, Kent.
Hoppet	Sweden	The ship ran aground in the Swine Bottoms. She was on a voyage from Gävle to Porto, Portugal. She was refloated in early December and put into Saint Petersburg for repairs.
Lorina	United Kingdom	The ship was driven ashore and wrecked 15 nautical miles (28 km) north of Porto.
Swan	United Kingdom	The sloop was abandoned in the English Channel off The Lizard, Cornwall. She was on a voyage from Plymouth, Devon to Penzance, Cornwall. Swan was later driven ashore and wrecked at Mullion, Cornwall.

== 15 November ==
List of shipwrecks: 15 November 1826
Ship	State	Description
Rose	United Kingdom	The ship was driven ashore and wrecked at Minehead, Somerset. Her crew were rescued. She was on a voyage from Newport, Monmouthshire to Plymouth, Devon

== 16 November ==
List of shipwrecks: 16 November 1826
Ship	State	Description
Maria	United Kingdom	The ship was wrecked near Hartland Quay, Devon with the loss of all but two of her crew. She was on a voyage from Smyrna, Ottoman Empire to Bristol, Gloucestershire.

== 17 November ==
List of shipwrecks: 17 November 1826
Ship	State	Description
Italian Courier	Kingdom of the Two Sicilies	The brig was driven ashore and wrecked at Port Isaac, Cornwall, United Kingdom. She was on a voyage from Palermo, Sicily to Antwerp, Netherlands.
Maria	United Kingdom	The ship was driven ashore and wrecked at Hartland Quay, Devon with the loss of all but two of her crew. She was on a voyage from Smyrna, Ottoman Empire to Bristol, Gloucestershire.
Rose	United Kingdom	The ship was driven ashore and wrecked at Dunster, Somerset. She was on a voyage from Newport, Monmouthshire to Plymouth, Devon.
Venus	United Kingdom	The schooner foundered in the Bristol Channel off Lundy Island, Devon with the loss of a crew member. She was on a voyage from Penzance, Cornwall to Burry Port, Glamorgan.

== 18 November ==
List of shipwrecks: 18 November 1826
Ship	State	Description
Anna Maria	Duchy of Holstein	The ship capsized at Hull, Yorkshire, United Kingdom.
Barbadoes	United Kingdom	The ship ran aground in the River Fal. She was on a voyage from Quebec City, Lower Canada, British North America to Truro, Cornwall. Barbadoes was refloated on 20 November.
Enterprize	United Kingdom	The schooner was wrecked on the Burrows Sand, in the North Sea off the coast of Essex with the loss of all hands. She was on a voyage from Lübeck to London.
Flora	United Kingdom	The ship was run aground and sank at Wexford. She was on a voyage from Liverpool, Lancashire to Wexford.
Lively	United Kingdom	The sloop was driven ashore at Sunderland, County Durham.
Venus	United Kingdom	The ship foundered in the Bristol Channel off Lundy Island, Devon. She was on a voyage from Penzance, Cornwall to Burry Port, Glamorgan.

== 19 November ==
List of shipwrecks: 19 November 1826
Ship	State	Description
Ajax	United Kingdom	The ship was driven ashore and wrecked on Faial Island, Azores. Her crew were rescued She was on a voyage from Dundee, Forfarshire to New York, United States.
Dauphin	France	The ship was driven ashore at La Bouille, Seine-Inférieure. She was on a voyage from Marseille, Bouches-du-Rhône to Rouen, Seine-Inférieure.
Jannette Margaretha	Netherlands	The ship was driven ashore and wrecked near Saltfleet, Lincolnshire, United Kingdom. She was on a voyage from Pekela, Groningen.to Hull, Yorkshire, United Kingdom.
Piedade e Almas	Portugal	The ship was abandoned, caught fire and was driven ashore and wrecked at Faial Island.

== 20 November ==
List of shipwrecks: 20 November 1826
Ship	State	Description
Ann	United Kingdom	The ship foundered in the North Sea off Lowestoft, Suffolk. Her crew were rescued. She was on a voyage from King's Lynn, Norfolk to London.
Benson	United Kingdom	The ship was beached at Hull, Yorkshire and sank. She was on a voyage from "Wyburg" to Hull. Benson was refloated the next day and taken in to Hull in a waterlogged condition.
Jane	United Kingdom	The ship was driven ashore and wrecked on Terceira Island, Azores. Her crew were rescued.
Rambler	United Kingdom	The ship was driven ashore and wrecked in Lough Foyle. She was on a voyage from Belfast, County Antrim to Londonderry.
St. Patrick	United Kingdom	The ship was driven ashore and wrecked on Terceira Island. Her crew were rescued.

== 21 November ==
List of shipwrecks: 21 November 1826
Ship	State	Description
Rival	United Kingdom	The brig was driven ashore and wrecked near Scituate, Massachusetts, United States with the loss of two of the 42 people on board. She was on a voyage from Liverpool, Lancashire to Boston, Massachusetts.

== 22 November ==
List of shipwrecks: 22 November 1826
Ship	State	Description
Alert	United Kingdom	The ship was driven ashore near Wells-next-the-Sea, Norfolk. She was on a voyage from Sunderland, County Durham, to Poole, Dorset. Alert was refloated and made for Great Yarmouth, Norfolk.
Neptunus	Stettin	The ship was wrecked on Skagen, Denmark. Her crew were rescued. She was on a voyage from Macduff, Aberdeenshire, United Kingdom to Stettin.

== 24 November ==
List of shipwrecks: 24 November 1826
Ship	State	Description
Active	United Kingdom	The ship was driven ashore and severely damaged at Harrington, Cumberland. She was on a voyage from Dublin to Harrington. Active was refloated on 29 November.
Adventure	United Kingdom	The sloop was wrecked at Easdale, Argyllshire. Her four crew were rescued by the steamship Stirling (United Kingdom). She was on a voyage from Inverness to Glasgow, Renfrewshire.
Castle of Harrington	United Kingdom	The brig was wrecked on Little Ross, Dumfriesshire with the loss of two of the five people on board. The survivors were rescued by General Bolivar (United Kingdom).
Cherub	United Kingdom	The ship ran aground at Harrington. She was on a voyage from Saint Petersburg, Russia to Harrington.
Ferne	Hamburg	The ship was wrecked near Saltfleet, Lincolnshire with the loss of all hands. She was on a voyage from Altona, Hamburg, to King's Lynn, Norfolk, United Kingdom.
John o' Groat	United Kingdom	The ship departed from Leith, Lothian for Thurso, Caithness. No further trace, presumed foundered in the North Sea with the loss of all hands.
Marquis of Wellington	United Kingdom	The ship was wrecked at Penrhos, Anglesey with the loss of all hands and a pilot. She was on a voyage from Liverpool, Lancashire to Bahia, Brazil.
Mayflower	United Kingdom	The ship was wrecked on the Stotfield Skerries, in the North Sea off the coast of Morayshire. Her crew survived. She was on a voyage from Banff to Portsoy, Aberdeenshire.
Prince of Waterloo	United Kingdom	The sloop departed from North Shields, County Durham for Leith. No further trace, presumed foundered in the North Sea with the loss of all hands.
Rock	United Kingdom	The ship was holed by an anchor and sank at Harrington. She was refloated on 29 November and found to be severely damaged.
Trader	United Kingdom	The ship was driven ashore and wrecked at Coleraine, County Antrim with the loss of all seven of her crew. She was on a voyage from Limerick to Greenock, Renfrewshire.
William Peile	United Kingdom	The ship was driven ashore at Reggio di Calabria, Kingdom of the Two Sicilies. She was on a voyage from Malta to Messina, Sicily.

== 25 November ==
List of shipwrecks: 25 November 1826
Ship	State	Description
Aultnaskiach	United Kingdom	The ship was driven ashore 5 nautical miles (9.3 km) east of Nairn, Inverness-shire. Her crew were rescued. She was refloated in mid-December and taken in to Nairn in a severely damaged condition.
Betsey and Ann	United Kingdom	The ship was driven ashore at North Sunderland, County Durham. She was refloated the next day.
Brothers	United Kingdom	The ship was driven on to the Ross Sands, in the North Sea off the coast of County Durham. her crew were rescued.
Countess of Kinnoull	United Kingdom	The schooner capsized at Perth. Her crew survived.
Dolphin	United Kingdom	The ship was damaged at Lerwick, Shetland Islands.
Eliza	United Kingdom	The ship foundered in the North Sea off Montrose, Forfarshire with the loss of all hands. She was on a voyage from Sunderland, County Durham to Aberdeen.
Flora	United Kingdom	The ship was driven ashore and wrecked on the north coast of Canna, Inner Hebrides. Her crew were rescued. She was on a voyage from Wick, Caithness to Bristol, Gloucestershire.
Hope	United Kingdom	The schooner was driven ashore and wrecked at Banff, Aberdeenshire.
Janet	United Kingdom	The sloop foundered in the North Sea off the mouth of the River Spey with the loss of all on board. vShe was on a voyage from Leith to Helmsdale, Sutherland.
Jean	United Kingdom	The ship foundered in the North Sea off the coast of Morayshire.
Jessamine	United Kingdom	The ship foundered in the Firth of Forth. She was on a voyage from a Baltic port to Leith, Lothian.
John	United Kingdom	The sloop was wrecked at Banff.
Josephine	United Kingdom	The brig foundered in the North Sea off Aberlady, Perthshire. She was on a voyage from Kiel, Duchy of Holstein to Leith.
Lord Nelson	United Kingdom	The brig was wrecked on the Ross Sands. Her crew were rescued.
Marchioness	United Kingdom	The ship was driven ashore at Blackpotts, Banffshire. All on board were rescued. She was on a voyage from Leith, Lothian to Inverness.
Marchioness of Huntly	United Kingdom	The smack was driven ashore at Boyndie, Aberdeenshire. All on board survived.
May	United Kingdom	The sloop was wrecked at Portsoy, Aberdeenshire.
Olivia	United Kingdom	The schooner was driven ashore and wrecked at Banff.
Rival	United Kingdom	The ship was driven ashore and wrecked at Pennan, Aberdeenshire. Her crew were rescued. She was on a voyage from Riga, Russia to Belfast, County Antrim.

== 26 November ==
List of shipwrecks: 26 November 1826
Ship	State	Description
Benedicta Elizabeth	Sweden	The ship was driven ashore and wrecked 20 nautical miles (37 km) west of Christiansand, Norway. Her crew were rescued. She was on a voyage from Gothenburg to Gibraltar.
Dusty Miller	United Kingdom	The ship was driven ashore and wrecked near Southport, Lancashire with the loss of all hands.
Lively	United Kingdom	The ship was driven ashore at Sunderland, County Durham.
Marquis of Conyngham	United Kingdom	The ship was driven ashore 7 nautical miles (13 km) west of Lough Foyle. Her crew were rescued. She was on a voyage from Londonderry to Dunfanaghy, County Donegal.
Patriot	United Kingdom	The ship was wrecked 20 nautical miles (37 km) west of Christiansand. She was on a voyage from Memel, Prussia to London.

== 27 November ==
List of shipwrecks: 27 November 1826
Ship	State	Description
Albertine	Hamburg	The ship was driven ashore near "Putchow". She was on a voyage from Hamburg to Stettin.
Pacific	United Kingdom	The ship was driven ashore and severely damaged at Wallasey, Cheshire. She was on a voyage from Hamburg to Liverpool, Lancashire. Pacific was later refloated and taken in to Liverpool.

== 29 November ==
List of shipwrecks: 29 November 1826
Ship	State	Description
Hanna Webber	(United Kingdom of Great Britain and Ireland) British North America	The ship was driven ashore at "Cacona", Lower Canada.
Hero	United Kingdom	The ship was driven ashore at Rivière-du-Loup, Lower Canada.

== 30 November ==
List of shipwrecks: 30 November 1826
Ship	State	Description
Barnsley	United Kingdom	The ship ran aground and was severely damaged at the entrance to the Goole Dyke. She was on a voyage from London to Thurso, Caithness.
Friendship	United Kingdom	The ship was driven ashore at North Somercotes, Lincolnshire. She was on a voyage from Sunderland, County Durham to Wisbech, Cambridgeshire. Friendship was refloated on 1 December.
Tryphena	United Kingdom	The ship was driven ashore and wrecked near the Islote de Sancti Petri, Spain. All on board were rescued. She was on a voyage from Cardiff, Glamorgan to Marseille, Bouches-du-Rhône, France.

== Unknown date ==
List of shipwrecks: Unknown date in November 1826
Ship	State	Description
Active	United Kingdom	The ship was lost between Bergen and Trondheim, Norway with the loss of all but two of her crew. She was on a voyage from Dundalk, County Louth to Trondheim.
Adèle	France	The ship was driven ashore and damaged at Morlaix, Finistère.
Argo	United Kingdom	The ship was driven ashore at Aberavon, Glamorgan. She was later refloated and taken in to Swansea, Glamorgan for repairs.
Brilliant Star	United Kingdom	The ship was driven ashore on the Burrow of Ballyteague, County Antrim in late November. Her crew were rescued.
Briton	United Kingdom	The ship was driven ashore on Scalpay, Inner Hebrides. She was on a voyage from Dundee, Forfarshire to Cork. She was refloated and repaired.
Cambrian	United Kingdom	The ship was driven ashore on the Isle of Mull.
Drie Zusters	Netherlands	The ship was wrecked on the coast of Lincolnshire, United Kingdom. Her crew were rescued. She was on a voyage from Rotterdam, South Holland to Hull, Yorkshire, United Kingdom.
Elizabeth	United Kingdom	The ship was wrecked at Richibucto, New Brunswick, British North America. She was on a voyage from Richibucto to Cork.
Eliza Jane	United Kingdom	The ship was wrecked off the Dutch coast.
Fortitude Increased	United Kingdom	The ship was driven ashore on Dragør, Denmark. She was on a voyage from Saint Petersburg, Russia to London. Fortitude Increased was refloated on 20 November and resumed her voyage.
Friends	United Kingdom	The ship was driven ashore and damaged at Morlaix.
Goliah	United States	The ship ran aground on the Brake Sand, in the North Sea. She was later refloated.
Good Intent	United Kingdom	The ship was wrecked on the coast of the Bay of Biscay in mid-November. She was on a voyage from Bilbao to Málaga, Spain. The vessel was later towed in to San Sebastián, Spain.
Guerrero	Spanish Navy	The 74-gun ship-of-the-line foundered off Cuba.
Jonge Grietje	Netherlands	The ship was driven ashore on the south coast of Texel, North Holland. She was on a voyage from Amsterdam, North Holland to Newcastle upon Tyne, Northumberland, United Kingdom. Jonge Grietje was later refloated and taken into port
Monarch	United Kingdom	The ship was driven ashore and severely damaged at Sunderland, County Durham. She was on a voyage from Quebec City, Lower Canada, British North America to Sunderland. Monarch was refloated on 23 November and taken in to Sunderland.
Monarch	United Kingdom	The ship was wrecked on Anticosti Island, Lower Canada, British North America. Her crew survived.
Pacific	United Kingdom	The ship was driven ashore at Wallasey, Cheshire in late November. Her crew were rescued. She was on a voyage from Hamburg to Liverpool, Lancashire.
Scandia	France	The ship was driven ashore near Bayonne, Basses-Pyrénées. She was on a voyage from Saint Petersburg to Bordeaux, Gironde.
Spea Nova	Norway	The ship struck a rock and was wrecked at Sandefjord. She was on a voyage from London to Christiania.
Tuskett	United Kingdom	The ship was lost in Brandon Bay before 20 November. Her crew were rescued. She was on a voyage from Tralee, County Cork to Liverpool.
Two Sisters	United Kingdom	The ship was lost at Narva, Russia. She was on a voyage from Liverpool to Saint Petersburg.
