= South Ascrib =

Location
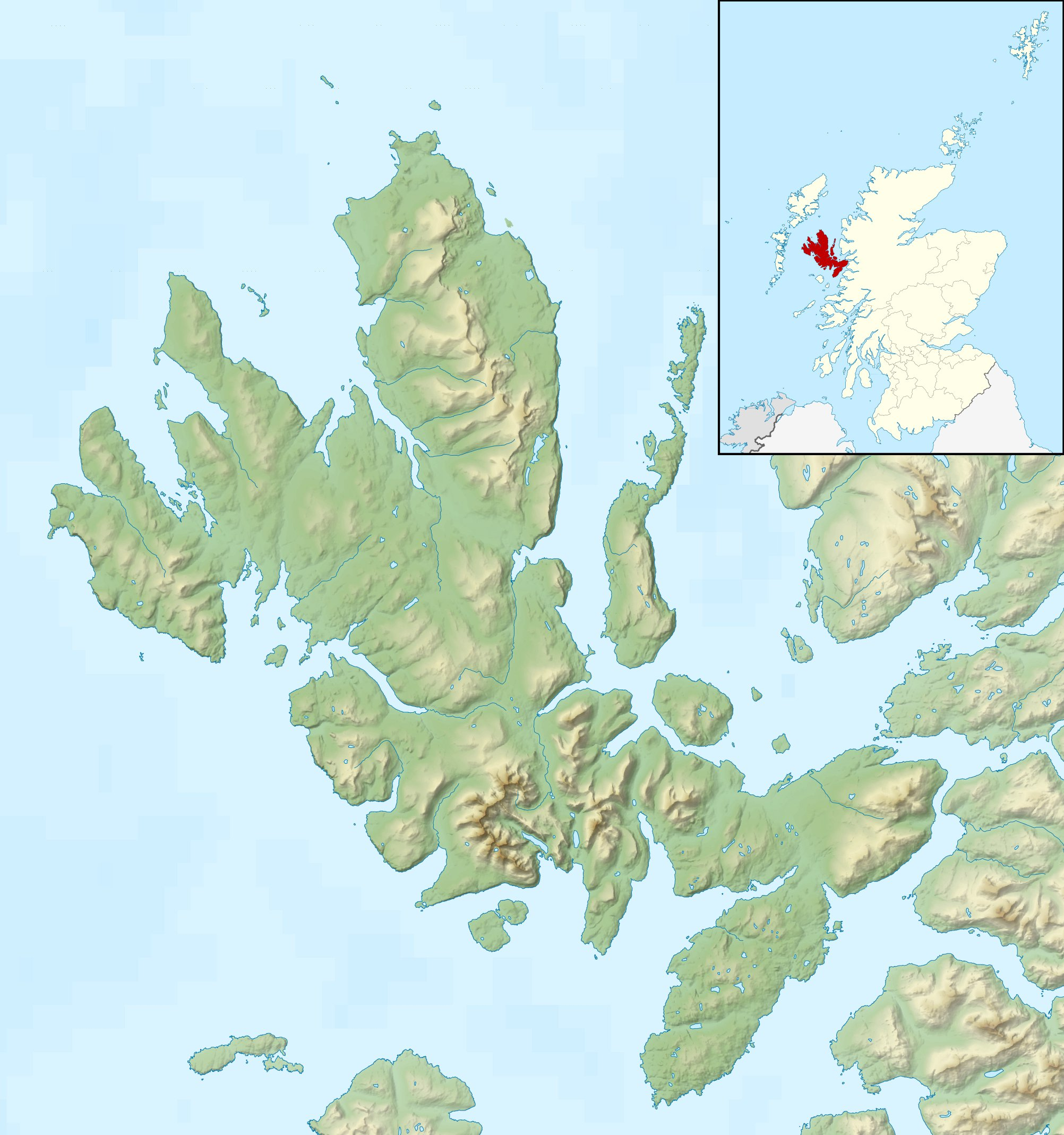
- South Ascrib shown relative to Skye
- OS grid reference: NG305645
- Coordinates: 57.58°N 6.511°W

Physical geography
- Island group: Skye
- Area: c. 30 ha
- Highest elevation: 41 m

Administration
- Council area: Highland
- Country: Scotland
- Sovereign state: United Kingdom

South Ascrib is an island in Loch Snizort between the Waternish and Trotternish peninsulas on the northern coasts of the island of Skye in Scotland.

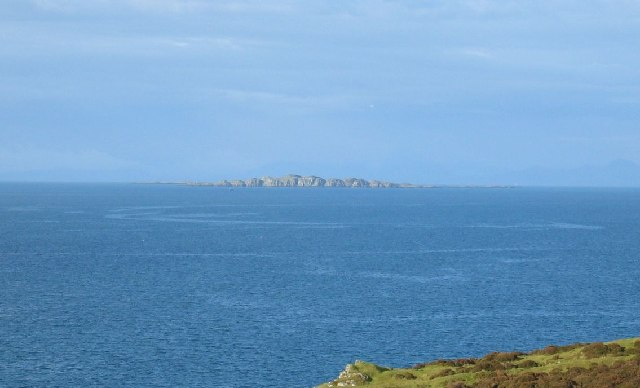
View of South Ascrib from Skye

At low tide, South Ascrib extends over roughly 30 hectares (74 acres), and its highest point is 41 metres (135 ft) above sea level. At high tide, South Ascrib becomes several smaller land masses cut off from one another (the northernmost one is Eilean Garave), and their combined area is about 25 hectares (62 acres). Other islands in the same group as South Ascrib are Eilean Creagach, Eilean Iosal, Sgeir à Chapuill and Sgeir à Chuin. The skerry of Scalp Rock lies just west of South Ascrib.

In 1703, Martin Martin wrote: "About 5 leagues to the south-west from Tulm lies the island Ascrib, which is divided into several parts by the sea; it is about two miles in compass, and affords very good pasturage; all kinds of fish abound in the neighbouring sea. On the south-west side of the isle Ascrib, at the distance of two leagues, lie the two small isles of Timan, directly in the mouth of Loch Arnizort; they are only fit for pasturage." There are indications of an underground monk's cell on the island dating from the 18th century.

South Ascrib has been designated as part of a Special Area of Conservation, owing to its significant breeding colonies of the common seal. About 600 of these seals reside there, which is about 35% of this seal's breeding population in the area of Skye, and about 1% of its population in the entire European Union. Puffin also breed in burrows on the Ascribs.

The islands were purchased in 1985.

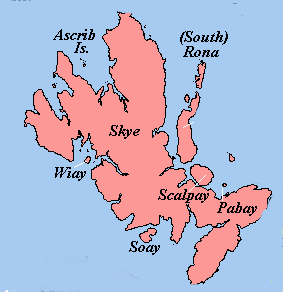
Ascrib Islands relative to Skye
