= MacCrimmon (piping family) =

Pipers to Highland Scottish clan chiefs

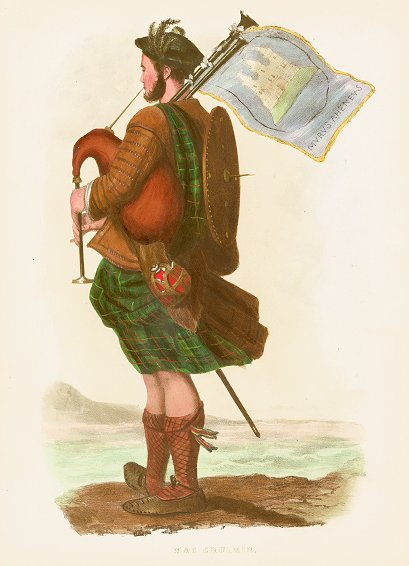
"Mac Cruimin" a Victorian era depiction of a MacCrimmon piper to MacLeod of MacLeod, illustrated by R. R. McIan, from The Clans of the Scottish Highlands, published in 1845. Clearly influenced by the earlier formal painting of a Clan Grant Piper i 1714.

The MacCrimmons (Gaelic: MacCruimein) are members of a Scottish family who have served as pipers to the chiefs of Clan MacLeod for several generations. The MacCrimmon kindred was centred at Borreraig near the Clan MacLeod seat of Dunvegan on the Isle of Skye. At Borreraig the MacCrimmons conducted a piping college.

Over time many pieces of Pìobaireachd (also known as Ceòl Mòr: "Big music") have been attributed to the MacCrimmons by oral tradition, although the actual authorship of these cannot be verified. Popular lore and the Gaelic oral tradition have made the MacCrimmons one of the most famous families of hereditary pipers, along with the MacArthurs (pipers to MacDonald of Sleat), the MacGregors (pipers to Campbell of Glenlyon) and the Rankins (pipers to the MacLeans of Coll, Duart and Mull). The term hereditary in popular lore has been used to imply an inherited above-average skill or special status. In the Scottish Highlands, until the Industrial Revolution, most social positions in the clan system were inherited, "from the chief down to the humblest cotter".

Since 1967, the MacCrimmon Memorial Piobaireachd Competition has taken place every year at Dunvegan Castle, where players compete to win the silver chanter. Competitors only play tunes attributed to the MacCrimmon family.

The origins of the MacCrimmons can only be speculated, as little in the way of written history exists.

In the 20th century the chiefs of Clan Macleod instated two MacCrimmons as hereditary pipers to the clan.

== Origins ==
The origin of the MacCrimmons is vague and has long been debated. One theory originating from Captain Neil MacLeod of Gesto was that the MacCrimmons descend from an Italian from the city of Cremona. Gesto was an intimate friend of Black John MacCrimmon (d. 1822), the last hereditary piper to MacLeod, and it is reputed that from him Gesto received the "Cremona tradition". According to Gesto, the founder of the MacCrimmons was a priest from Cremona named Giuseppe Bruno, whose son Petrus (or Patrick Bruno) was born in Cremona in 1475 and later emigrated to Ulster in 1510. On Patrick's arrival in Ireland, he then married the daughter of a piping family and Gaelicised his name. Gesto's origin for the MacCrimmons is disputed by other writers. Alastair Campbell of Airds suggests that the Cremona tradition rests on a misinterpretation of a 1612 charter, written in Latin, to Donald MacCrimmon.

MacCrimmon is an Anglicised form of the Scottish Gaelic Mac Ruimein, meaning "son of Ruimean".

While this name origin would seem to tie in with the MacCrimmons' association with the MacLeods and the Isle of Skye, the earliest references to a MacCrimmon (who were also pipers) appear in Campbell lands. The earliest reference is found in a bond of manrent of 29 November 1574 between Colin Campbell of Glenorchy and "John Tailzoure Makchrwmen in the Kirktoun of Balquhidder and Malccolme pyper Mackchrwmen in Craigro"; this reference being over ninety years before the MacCrimmons are found as pipers to MacLeod of Dunvegan in Skye. Another early reference is to a "Patrik Mcquhirryman, pipe," mentioned in the Register of the Privy Council, vol. 5 (1592–99), who is mentioned in connection with a crime in Perthshire. Alastair Campbell of Airds speculated that the MacCrimmons were pipers to the Campbells of Glenorchy prior to the MacLeods of Dunvegan and Harris. The known lineage of the hereditary MacCrimmon pipers to the MacLeods extends from Donald Mor (c. 1570–1640, in service from 1620) through Patrick Mor (c. 1586–1670) to at least Patrick Og (c. 1645–1730).

By the mid-1690s, the MacCrimmons are confirmed to have been in the Hebrides and seem to have been recognised as masters of their craft. An order from John Campbell, Earl of Breadalbane to his chamberlain, Campbell of Barcaldine, reads: "Give McIntyre ye pyper fforty pounds scots as his prentises(hi)p with McCrooman till May nixt as also provyde him in what Cloths he needs and dispatch him immediately to the Isles". The order seems to relate to a statement written by the mentioned Earl of Breadalbane on 22 April 1697, at Taymouth in Perthshire: "Item paid to quantiliane McCraingie McLeans pyper for one complete year as prentyce fie for the Litle pyper before he was sent to McCrooman, the soume of £160" (modern translation: "Item, paid to Conduiligh Mac Frangaich [Rankin], MacLean's piper, for one complete year, as apprentice fee for the Little Piper before he [the Little Piper] was sent to MacCrimmon, the sum of £160"). The MacCrimmon instructor that is referenced may well be Pàdraig Òg.

=== Hereditary pipers ===
Boreraig, Isle of Skye

Though much has been written about the MacCrimmon pipers to the MacLeods of Dunvegan, there is little reliable information on them. The MacCrimmon of whom there is the most reliable information is Red Donald (Dòmhnull Ruadh) (d 31 July 1825). Red Donald held tacks at Borreraig and Shader and at Trien in Waternish and also a farm at Glenelg. Red Donald's older brother was Black John (Iain Dubh) (d 1822), who also held the Boreraig tack. The MacCrimmon brothers had their most formative years during the Disarming Act. It is accepted that these MacCrimmon brothers were sons of Malcolm (Calum), son of Pàdraig Òg, who were both pipers to the chiefs of MacLeod and who also held land from them. Red Donald and Black John's father and paternal uncle (Donald Ban) both piped for the Government forces in the 1745–46 Jacobite Rising.

==== Donald Ban ====
During the Jacobite Rising in 1745, the chief of Clan MacLeod supported the Hanoverians against the Jacobites. As MacLeod's piper, Donald Ban MacCrimmon (Dòmnhall/Dòmnhull Bàn MacCruimein – bàn meaning fairhaired) took an active part in the conflicts against the Jacobite forces. Donald Ban's brother Malcolm was captured on 23 December 1745, following the Hanoverian defeat at the Battle of Inverurie. During his captivity, the pipers in the Jacobite army went on strike, refusing to play while the "King of Pipers" was held captive. According to popular tradition, Donald Ban wrote his lament, Cha till, cha till, cha till, MacCruimein (meaning literally "MacCrimmon will not, will not, will not return." it has been variously titled "No more, no more, no more, MacCrimmon", "MacCrimmon shall never return", "MacCrimmon's Lament" among others) with an intimation of his fate.

Donald Ban was eventually killed during the Rout of Moy when on 18 February 1746, with the Jacobites marching on Inverness, Lord Loudoun led 1,500 men in an attempt to capture Charles Edward Stuart. When the Government troops advanced upon Moy in the dark they encountered a watch made up of only a handful of Mackintoshes. In the encounter, a single shot was fired, and Donald Ban was instantly killed. With the death of their piper, panic quickly spread and Loudoun's forces fled in the Rout of Moy. According to John William O'Sullivan's narrative, "McCloud had his Piper killed just by his side, & was very much laughed at when he came back".

==== Red Donald and Black John ====
===== Red Donald =====
The MacCrimmon of whom there is the most reliable information is Red Donald (Dòmhnull Ruadh) (d 31 July 1825). Red Donald held tacks at Borreraig and Shader, and at Trien in Waternish, and also a farm at Glenelg. In the early 1770s he left Scotland and settled in North America in what is now North Carolina. He was away from Scotland for about seventeen years (1773–1790), though there is no record of him associated with his involvement with the pipes in any way. He settled in Anson County (in what is now North Carolina, US). He took part in the American Revolutionary War as a Loyalist, raising troops for the British forces and serving as a lieutenant. He claimed to have been present at the Battle of Moore's Creek Bridge in 1776. He eventually lost an eye. Red Donald evidently evaded capture by the Americans at Yorktown in 1781. After the end of hostilities, he spent seven years as a Loyalist in Shelburne County, Nova Scotia, (in what is now Nova Scotia, Canada).

He returned to Scotland in 1790, at the insistence of the Highland Society of London, which defrayed the cost of MacCrimmon's, his wife's, and three of their four children's journey back to Scotland. In 1808 the Highland Society of London proposed that a College of Piping be re-established at Fort Augustus, and that Lt. MacCrimmon should supervise instruction. This proposal was declined, though, causing Red Donald "disappointment and mortification".

According to J. G. Lockhart's biography of Sir Walter Scott: "MacLeod's hereditary piper is called MacCrimmon, but the present holder of the office has risen above his profession. He is an old, a lieutenant in the army, and a most capital piper, possessing about 200 tunes and pibrochs, most of which will probably die with him as he declines to have any of his sons instructed in the art. He plays to MacLeod and his lady, but only in the same room, and maintains his minstrel privilege by putting on his bonnet so soon as he begins to play".

Red Donald's decision not to pass his knowledge of piping on to his sons seems to be related to the massive emigration of the MacLeod estates in the 1770s, in which he himself gave up Borreraig and sailed for North America. Even in 1799, after his return to Scotland, Macleod put many substantial tacks up for sale around Dunvegan. In his later life, he is associated with Glenelg, which MacLeod sold in 1798 and subsequently resold in 1811, 1824, and 1837, further forcing the poorer Highlanders to emigrate to North America.

===== Black John =====
The last MacCrimmon to be hereditary piper to MacLeod of MacLeod (until the modern era) was Black John MacCrimmon. According to tradition, in 1795 Black John decided to emigrate to America, though he only got as far as Greenock before making up his mind to stay on the Isle of Skye, where he died in 1822 aged ninety-one.

==== Modern Appointment of Hereditary Piper of MacLeod ====
The MacCrimmon piping dynasty is honored in the form of a cairn built in 1933, at Borreraig. This cairn, which overlooks Loch Dunvegan 8 miles distant from Dunvegan Castle, was paid for by clan societies and donations from around the world and is credited to the foresight of Mr. Fred MacLeod. The Gaelic inscription on the cairn reads in translation as "The Memorial Cairn of the MacCrimmons, of whom ten generations were the hereditary pipers of MacLeod and who were renowned as composers, performers, and instructors of the classical music of the bagpipe. Near to this post stood the MacCrimmons' School of Music, 1500–1800".

In the last century, with a revival in clan interest, the modern chiefs of Clan MacLeod have instated two MacCrimmons as hereditary pipers to the chief. Malcolm Roderick MacCrimmon, a Canadian born in 1918, started piping at the age of eight. With the start of the Second World War, he joined the Calgary Highlanders pipe band. Through his connections with George Poulter, FSA Scot., Hon Secretary of the Clan MacCrimmon Society of London, he wrote to Dame Flora MacLeod, chief of Clan MacLeod, seeking approval and support to wear MacLeod ribbons on his bagpipes. The chief then wrote to the regiment's commanding officer, Lieutenant Colonel Fred Scott, and permission was granted.

In 1942, Malcolm was the first MacCrimmon piper to play in the Great Hall of Dunvegan Castle in over 100 years and was verbally appointed by Dame Flora MacLeod of MacLeod (28th Chief of Clan MacLeod) as the ninth "hereditary piper" to the Chief of Clan MacLeod. In 1978, John MacLeod of MacLeod, the 29th chief of Clan MacLeod, while visiting Calgary, Alberta, Canada, formally made Malcolm's son, Iain Norman MacCrimmon, the tenth hereditary piper to the chief of Clan MacLeod. In 2020, JB McCrummen, FSA Scot, a genealogist and historian, proved, through YDNA testing, that Malcolm MacCrimmon's family is descended from the MacCrimmons of Borreraig.
