= Totaig =

Coordinates: 57.45912°N 6.67107°W

Totaig: Scottish Gaelic: Totaig
- Location within the Isle of Skye
- OS grid reference: NG199506
- Council area: Highland
- Country: Scotland
- Sovereign state: United Kingdom
- Postcode district: IV55 8
- Police: Scotland
- Fire: Scottish
- Ambulance: Scottish

Totaig (from Old Norse Topt-vík) is a small crofting settlement on the west coast of Loch Dunvegan on the Isle of Skye.

The village of Dunvegan is 5 miles (8 kilometres) southeast.

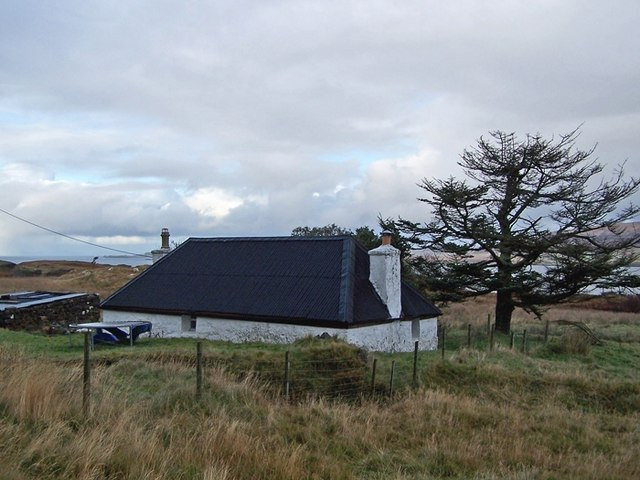
Cottage in Totaig
