= Stein, Skye =

Coordinates: 57.51407°N 6.5592°W

Stein: Scottish Gaelic: Steinn
- Location within the Isle of Skye
- OS grid reference: NG270562
- Council area: Highland
- Country: Scotland
- Sovereign state: United Kingdom
- Post town: Waternish
- Postcode district: IV55 8
- Police: Scotland
- Fire: Scottish
- Ambulance: Scottish

Stein (Scottish Gaelic: Steinn) is a crofting township, situated on the north eastern shore of Loch Bay, in the west of the Waternish peninsula, on the isle of Skye in the Highlands of Scotland. Previously known as Lochbay, it is in the council area of Highland.

== History ==
In 1790, the British Fisheries Society planned a fishing port to be designed by Thomas Telford. However, poor management of the project, and the lack of enthusiasm shown by the local crofting population for fishing, meant only a small proportion of the scheme was constructed. By 1837 the Society had made a loss of £3,000 and seven years later it sold off the land it had acquired. Only a few structures were completed to Telford's design, including a pier of 1796–1802, a storehouse of 1795 (now converted to housing), and possibly the now-ruined smithy of 1799.

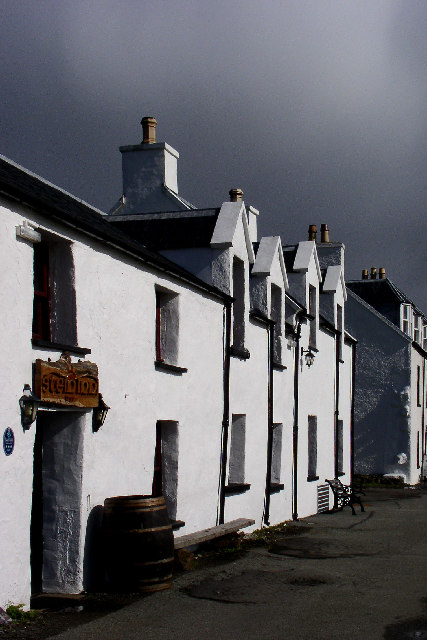
The Stein Inn

The 18th-century Stein Inn is the oldest pub on Skye. The folk singer Donovan had a house in Stein during the 1970s.

== Local area ==
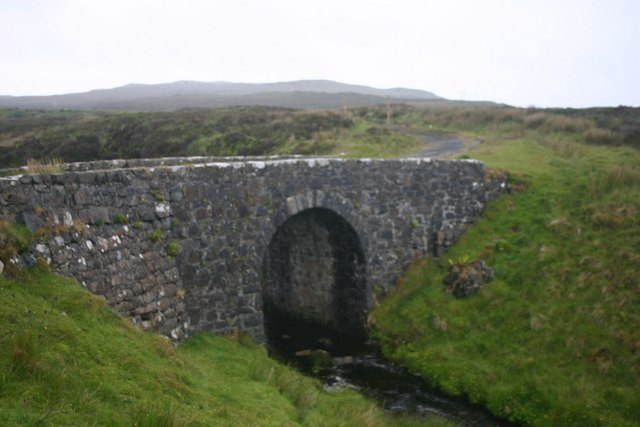
The Fairy Bridge on the B888

The village of Dunvegan lies approximately 5 miles (8 kilometres) south along the B888 road. Near the junction of this road with the A850, just 6 kilometres (3 3/4 miles) from Stein is the Fairy Bridge. According to tradition as related by R.C. MacLeod one of the chiefs of Clan MacLeod married a fairy; however, after twenty years she is forced to leave him and return to fairyland. She bade farewell to the chief at the Fairy Bridge and gave him the Fairy Flag. She promised that if it was waved in times of danger and distress, help would be given on three occasions. A similar tradition, related by John Arnott MacCulloch, stated that although the fairy's gift had the power to save both her husband and his clan, afterwards an invisible being would come to take both the flag and its bearer away—never to be seen again.
