= Uig, Duirinish =

Coordinates: 57.475962°N 6.6837671°W

Uig
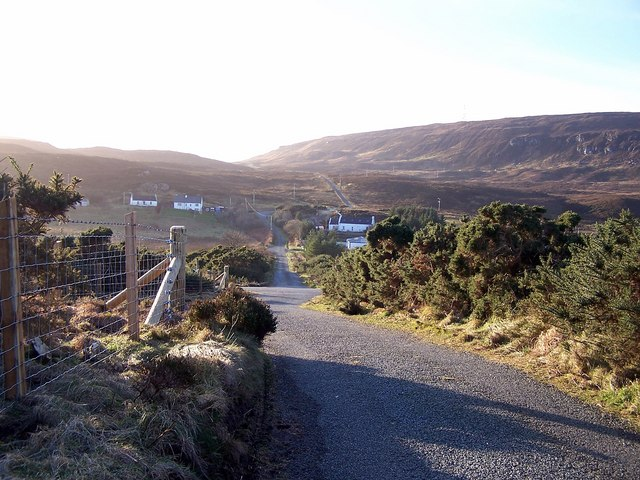

- Location within the Isle of Skye
- Civil parish: Duirinish
- Council area: Highland
- Country: Scotland
- Sovereign state: United Kingdom
- Police: Scotland
- Fire: Scottish
- Ambulance: Scottish

Uig is a hamlet 14 miles (23 km) south west of Uig in Snizort, on the eastern shore of Loch Dunvegan, in the civil parish of Duirinish, on the Isle of Skye, in the council area of Highland, Scotland.

== History ==
The name "Uig" came from Old Norse vík ("bay").
