= Halistra =

Coordinates: 57.54172°N 6.60149°W

Halistra: Scottish Gaelic: Halastra
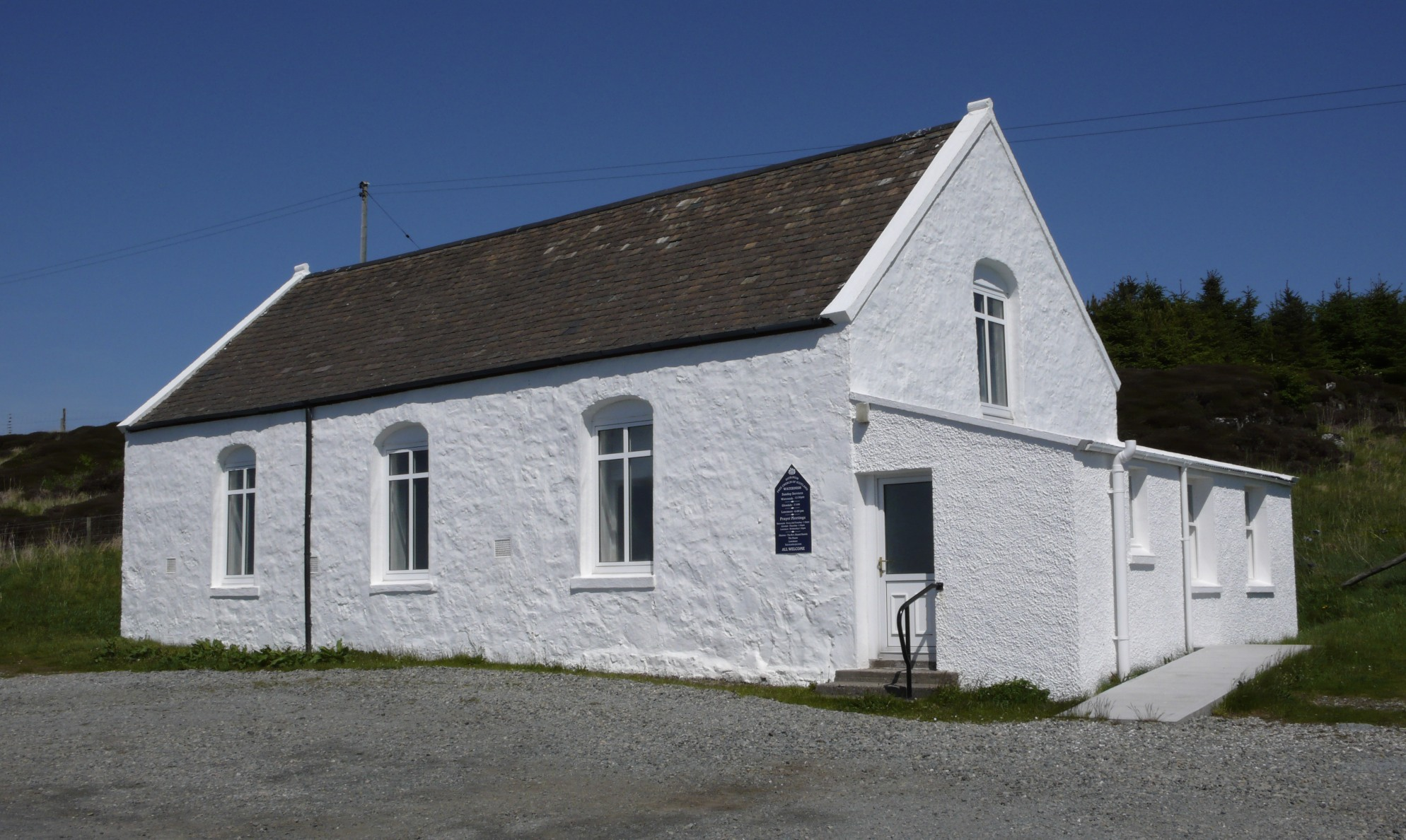
- Waternish Church, Halistra

- Location within the Isle of Skye
- OS grid reference: NG247595
- Council area: Highland
- Country: Scotland
- Sovereign state: United Kingdom
- Post town: Hallin
- Postcode district: IV55 8
- Dialling code: 01470
- Police: Scotland
- Fire: Scottish
- Ambulance: Scottish

Halistra (Scottish Gaelic: Halastra), is a small crofting township located on the west coast of the Waternish peninsula, overlooking Loch Bay, on the island of Skye, Scotland. It is in the Scottish council area of Highland. It comprises Upper Halistra, Lower Halistra and Hallin and is situated about 1 mile (1.5 kilometres) north of Stein. Halistra is a Scandinavian name that implies the Halistra settlement has been present from at least the Viking Age.
