= Bernisdale =

Coordinates: 57.48206°N 6.32572°W

Bernisdale: Scottish Gaelic: Beàrnasdal
- Location within the Isle of Skye
- OS grid reference: NG408517
- Council area: Highland
- Country: Scotland
- Sovereign state: United Kingdom
- Postcode district: IV51 9
- Police: Scotland
- Fire: Scottish
- Ambulance: Scottish

Bernisdale (Scottish Gaelic: Beàrnasdal) is a small township, near the head of Loch Snizort Beag, Isle of Skye in the Highlands and Islands and is in the Scottish council area of Highland.
