= John Knox (philanthropist) =

John Knox (1720 – 1 August 1790 in Dalkeith) was a Scottish bookseller, author and philanthropist.

== Life ==
After spending many years as a bookseller in the Strand in London, Knox retired with a large fortune. In 1764 he began travelling extensively through his native Scotland, making sixteen tours between 1764 and 1775 alone. He became concerned with the poverty he found there and eventually wrote a number of works projecting improvements. In 1784 he published A View of the British Empire, more especially Scotland, with some Proposals for the Improvement of that Country, the Extension of its Fisheries, and the Relief of the People. In 1785 a third edition, enlarged to two volumes, was published. In this work he proposed, among other improvements, canals between the Forth and Clyde, between Loch Fyne and the Atlantic, and between Fort William and Inverness, all of which were later built. A lecture he gave to the Highland Society of London was subsequently published as A discourse on the expediency of establishing fishing stations: or small towns, in the Highlands of Scotland and the Hebride Islands (1786). In this work he proposed the creation of as many as 50 fishing villages in the Highlands, to be built by private funds.

Knox's ideas had been commended by a parliamentary committee on the Scottish fisheries in 1785, which also recommended that a limited liability company be formed to advance the scheme. This led to the formation of "The British Society for Extending the Fisheries and Improving the Sea Coast of this Kingdom" (later to be called simply the "British Fisheries Society"), with a capital of £150,000, with John Campbell, 5th Duke of Argyll as the governor. The society commissioned Knox (a member himself) to travel even more extensively in Scotland. On his return the society gave him a gold medal for his work, which led to the publication of A Tour through the Highlands of Scotland and the Hebride Isles in MDCCLXXXVI (1787). This work was translated into French in 1790. In this work he refines his scheme to recommend "to erect 40 stations, or fishing towns, at 25 miles from each other, more or less, as circumstances suit, to consist of about 16 houses of two stories and two rooms, with an inn and school-house, and an acre, or half an acre, to each. Each town to cost £2,000, and the whole number £80,000. Each town to have 50 Scots acres." To meet the emergencies of war, Knox recommended that Great Britain should always hold two hundred thousand seamen in readiness.

Knox later proposed an ambitious work on the "Picturesque Scenery of Scotland". Artists such as Joseph Farington and the younger Charles Catton were recruited for the project, but it was abandoned after Knox's death in 1790.

== Legacy ==
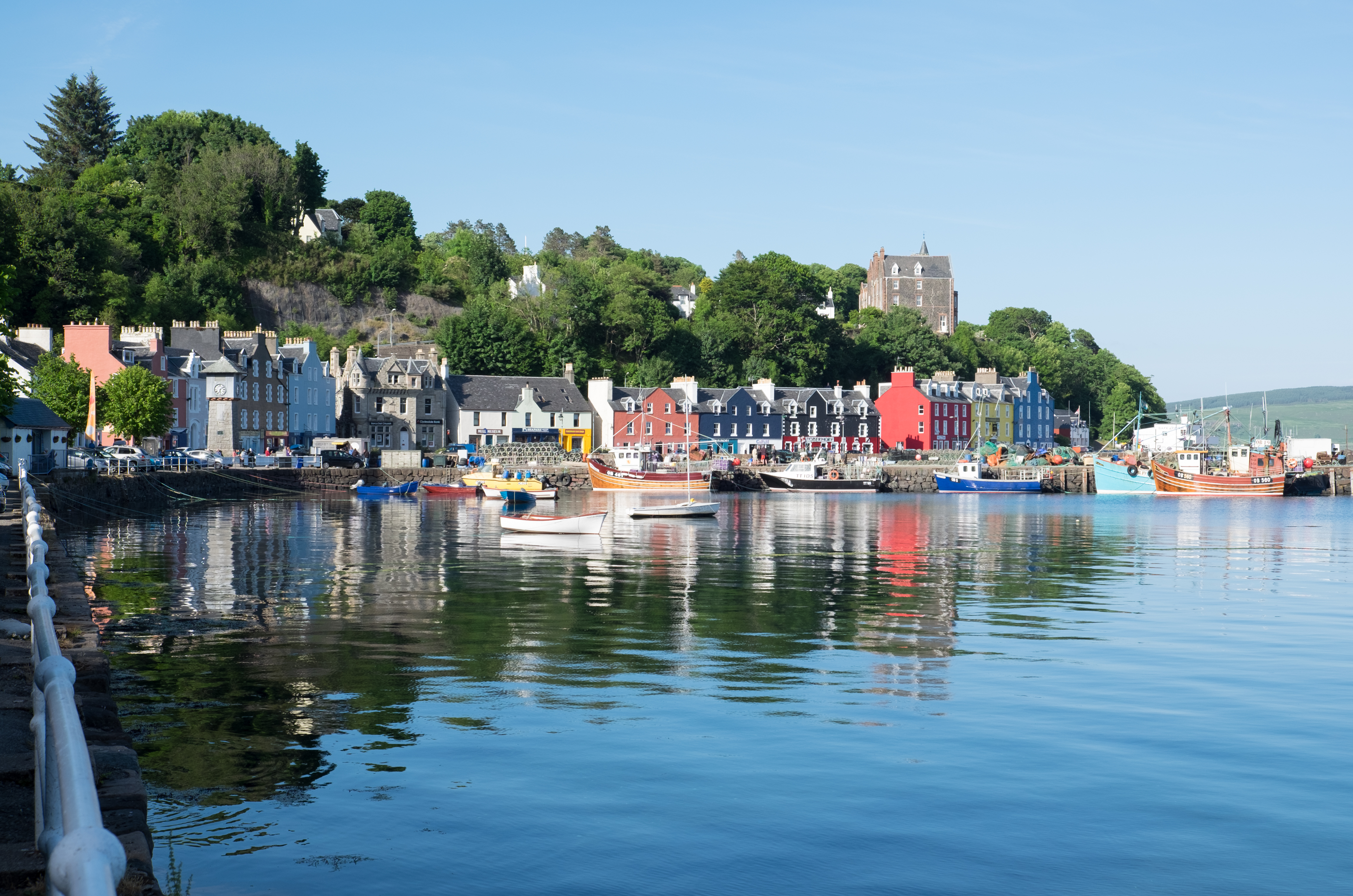
Tobermory on the Isle of Mull - one of the fishing towns founded to implement Knox's plan

The work of John Knox, along with the work of economist James Anderson and writer William Thomson, brought attention to the poverty of Highlands Scotland and promoted schemes for fisheries improvements and canals. The British Fisheries Society did implement parts of Knox's schemes, building fishing facilities along the Scottish coast in Pulteneytown, Ullapool, Isle Ristol, Skye, Mull and other locations.
