= The Three Chimneys =

Coordinates: 57.4434°N 6.6420°W

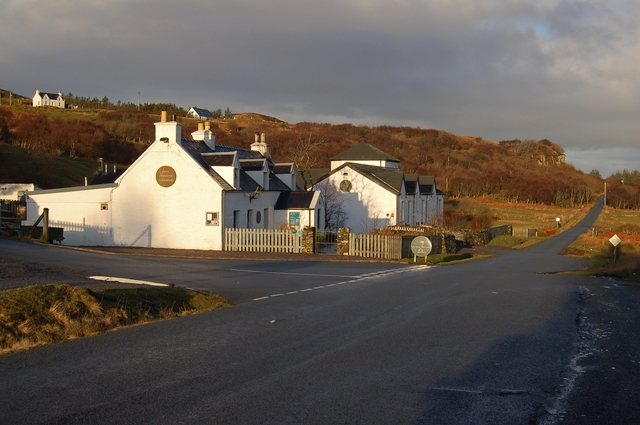
The Three Chimneys Restaurant

The Three Chimneys is a restaurant in Colbost, Isle of Skye, Scotland. While in operation beforehand, the restaurant came to prominence after being taken over around 1985 by Eddie and Shirley Spear. It has won over 30 major awards and in July 2010, was named as one of the New York food critic Frank Bruni's top five favourite restaurants. It was included in the Restaurant magazine list of the world's 50 best restaurants in 2002 (28th position) and 2003 (32nd position).

The restaurant was sold by the Spears to Gordon Campbell Gray in April 2019.
