= Colbost =

Hamlet on the Isle of Skye, Scotland

Coordinates: 57.443°N 6.648°W

Colbost: Scottish Gaelic: Cealabost
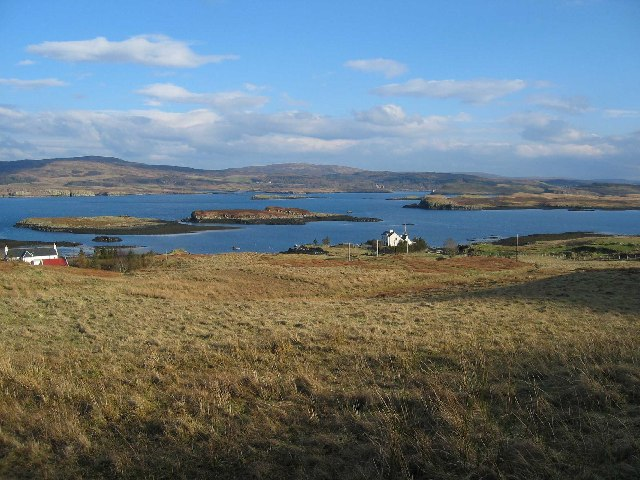
- A long view of the house by the jetty with several of the islands in Loch Dunvegan behind

- Location within the Isle of Skye
- OS grid reference: NG212488
- Council area: Highland
- Lieutenancy area: Ross and Cromarty
- Country: Scotland
- Sovereign state: United Kingdom
- Post town: ISLE OF SKYE
- Postcode district: IV55
- Dialling code: 01470
- Police: Scotland
- Fire: Scottish
- Ambulance: Scottish
- UK Parliament: Ross, Skye and Lochaber
- Scottish Parliament: Ross, Skye and Inverness West

Colbost (Scottish Gaelic: Cealabost) is a scattered hamlet on the B884 road, in the Glendale estate, overlooking Loch Dunvegan on the Scottish island of Skye.

The two main attractions of this small settlement are The Three Chimneys restaurant and the Croft Museum.

== Three Chimneys ==
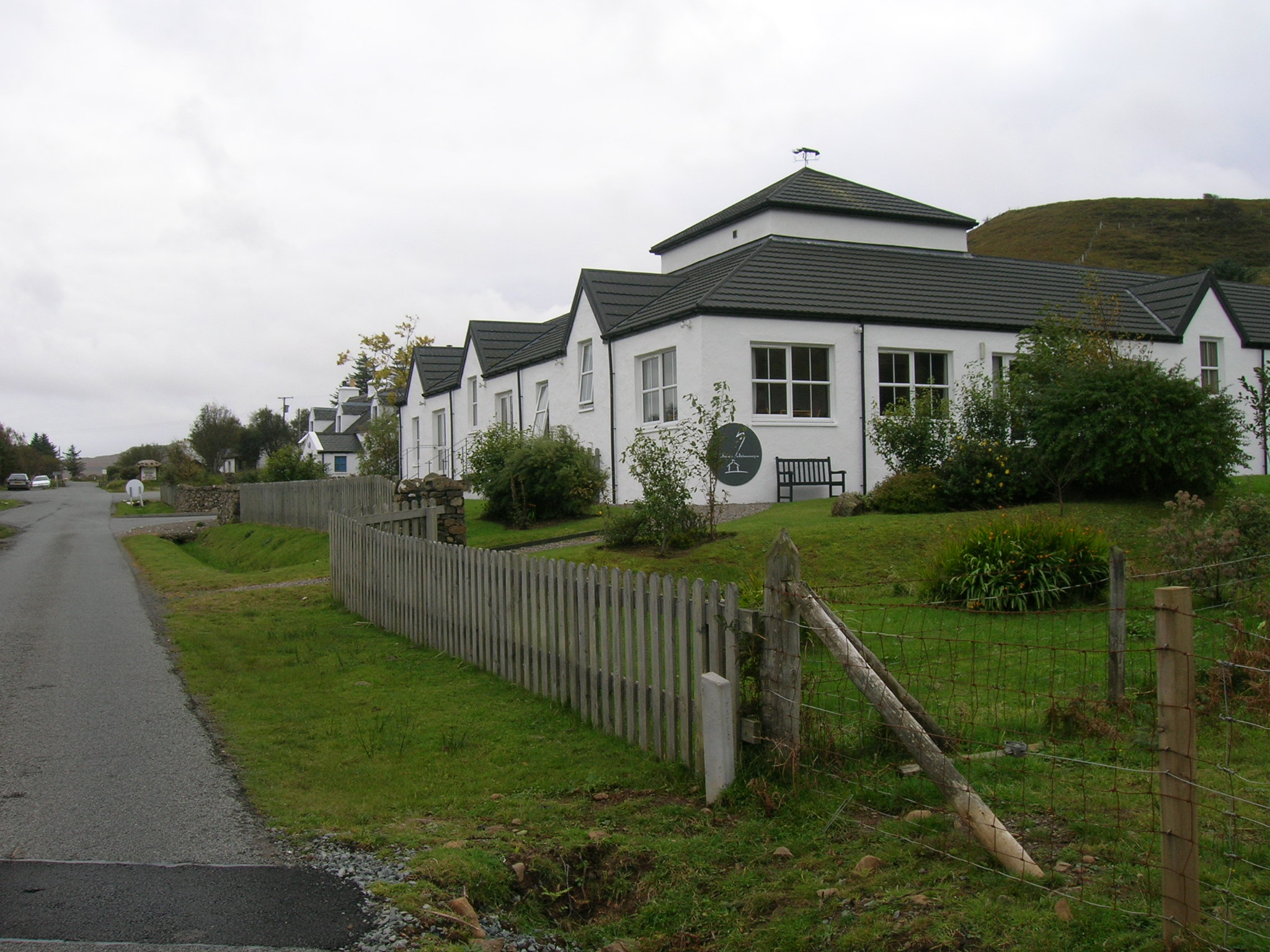
The Three Chimneys

The Three Chimneys is a five-star restaurant and hotel. On its annual Top 50 Restaurant magazine listed the Three Chimneys as the 28th best restaurant in the world in 2002 and 32nd in the world in 2003.

== Colbost Croft Museum ==
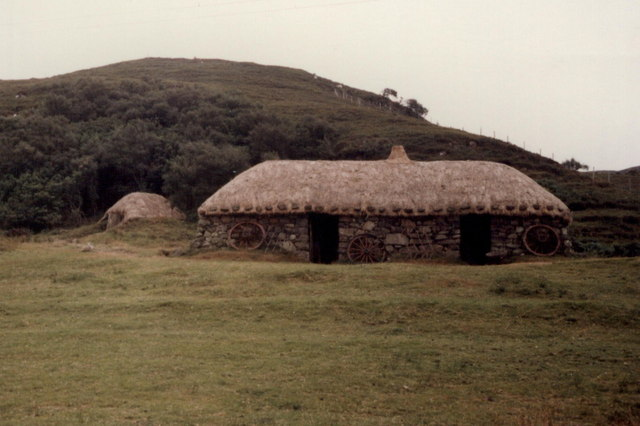
Blackhouse at Colbost Folk Museum

The Colbost Croft Museum, also known as the Folk Museum, is a simple open-air exhibit, set in a garden. At the centre of this simple grassy garden is a perfectly preserved 19th century Hebridean crofter's blackhouse, of which there would have been thousands on Skye before the tragic Highland clearances. The house incorporates dry stone walls and a heather-thatched roof. Inside there is the simple furniture that would have been found in such a cottage as well as newspaper clippings related to the clearances. The smell of smoke is dominant, as there is no chimney to accommodate the open fire - just a hole in the roof. At the back of the garden there is more vegetation and two little huts where produce would have been stored, one of which contains a mock illegal whisky brewing plant. Lying around the garden there are various agricultural tools including an old rusty plow. The self-service ticket office is housed in a small shack with an upturned boat for a roof. Sheep often wander into the garden to graze making this not only an open-air museum but also a living museum.
