= Borreraig =

Coordinates: 57.484°N 6.694°W

Borreraig: Scottish Gaelic: Boraraig
- Location within the Isle of Skye
- OS grid reference: NG1853
- Council area: Highland
- Country: Scotland
- Sovereign state: United Kingdom
- Police: Scotland
- Fire: Scottish
- Ambulance: Scottish

Borreraig (Scottish Gaelic: Boraraig) is a crofting settlement in Duirinish, north-west of Dunvegan on the Isle of Skye. The ancient and famous MacCrimmon Piping Heritage Centre is based in the village, where the chiefs of the Highlands sent their young pipers for training.

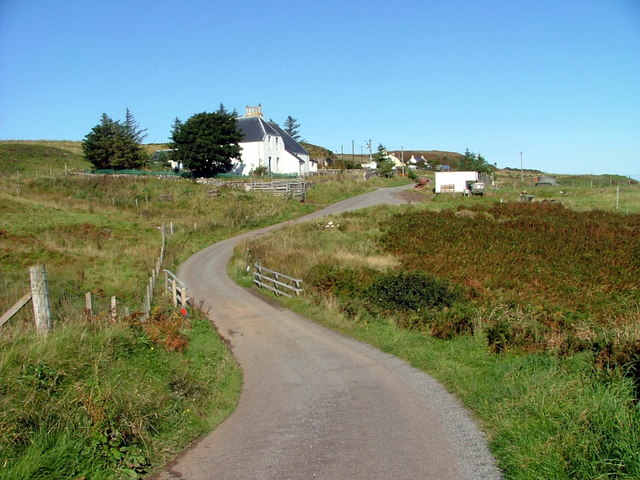
The old school at Borreraig, formerly home to the MacCrimmon Piping Heritage Centre
