= Gillen, Skye =

Hamlet on the Isle of Skye, Scotland

Coordinates: 57.545448°N 6.569507°W

Gillen: Scottish Gaelic: Gilean
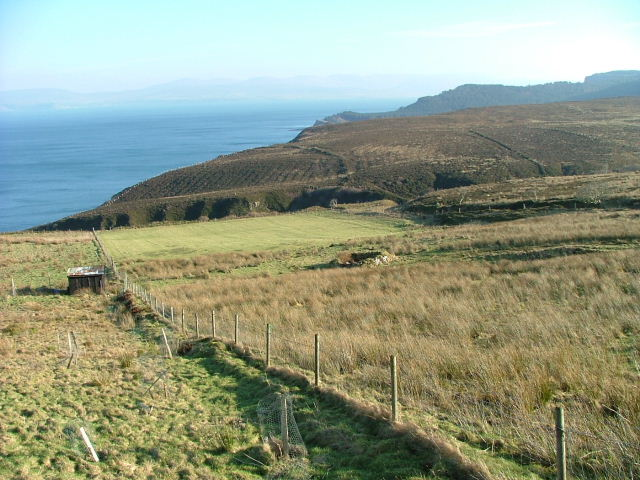
- Croftland at Gillen The Trotternish Peninsula can just be seen in the distance through the haze

- Location within the Isle of Skye
- OS grid reference: NG267598
- Council area: Highland
- Lieutenancy area: Ross and Cromarty
- Country: Scotland
- Sovereign state: United Kingdom
- Post town: ISLE OF SKYE
- Postcode district: IV55
- Dialling code: 01470
- Police: Scotland
- Fire: Scottish
- Ambulance: Scottish
- UK Parliament: Inverness, Skye and West Ross-shire
- Scottish Parliament: Ross, Skye and Inverness West

Gillen (Scottish Gaelic: Gilean) is a hamlet on the Waternish peninsula of the island of Skye in the Scottish council area of Highland.
