= Loch Snizort =

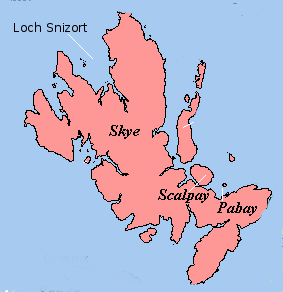

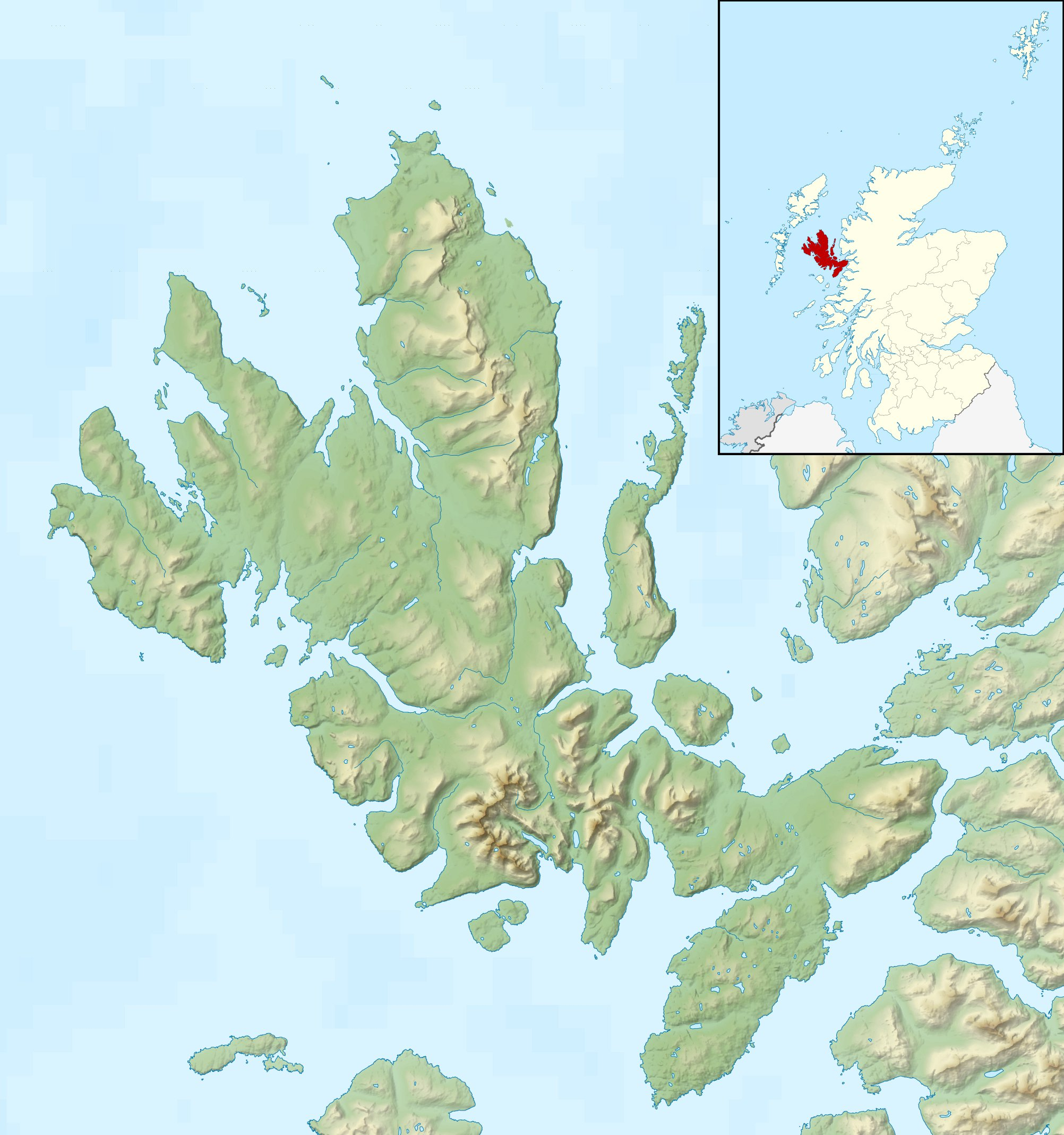
- Location within Isle of Skye
- Location: Isle of Skye, Hebrides, Scotland
- Coordinates: 57°34′N 6°28′W
- Type: Sea Loch
- Primary inflows: River Snizort
- Primary outflows: The Lower Minch
- Max. width: 8 miles (13 km)
- Islands: Ascrib Islands
- Settlements: Bernisdale
- References: Groome, Francis H (1885). Ordnance Gazetteer of Scotland: A Survey of Scottish Topography. Vol. 6. Thomas C. Jack, Grange Publishing Works.

Loch Snizort (Scottish Gaelic: Loch Snìosort) is a sea loch in the northwest of the Isle of Skye between the Waternish and Trotternish peninsulas. It is fed by the River Snizort, originating in the hills east of Bracadale. The mouth of Loch Snizort gives access to the lower Minch and contains the Ascrib Islands.

Sea fishing in Loch Snizort yields mackerel, pollock, and ling.

== See also ==
- List of lochs of Scotland
