= Loch Dunvegan =

Sea loch in the Inner Hebrides of Scotland

Coordinates: 57°30′N 6°40′W

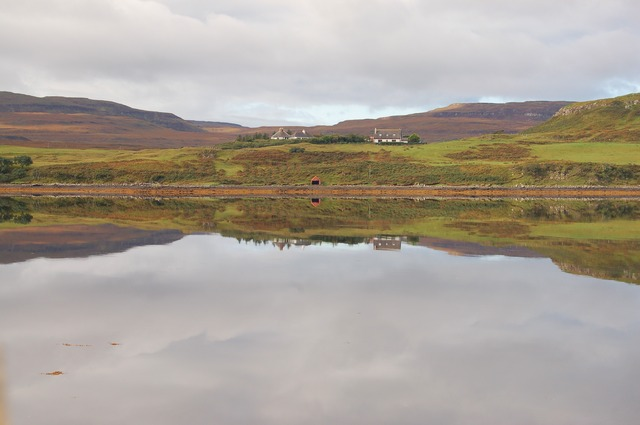
Boathouse at Garrachan Looking across Loch Dunvegan from the village towards the boathouse and the 'Beehives' on the west shore of the loch.

Loch Dunvegan (Scottish Gaelic: Loch Dhùn Bheagain), is a sea loch on the west coast of the island of Skye in the Inner Hebrides of Scotland. Dunvegan, the village it was named after is located by its southern shore. The settlements of Galtrigill, Borreraig, Uig (Duirinish) and Colbost are located on its western shore. Claigan is located on its eastern shore.
