= Waternish =

Peninsula on the Isle of Skye, Scotland

Coordinates: 57°32′20″N 6°34′30″W

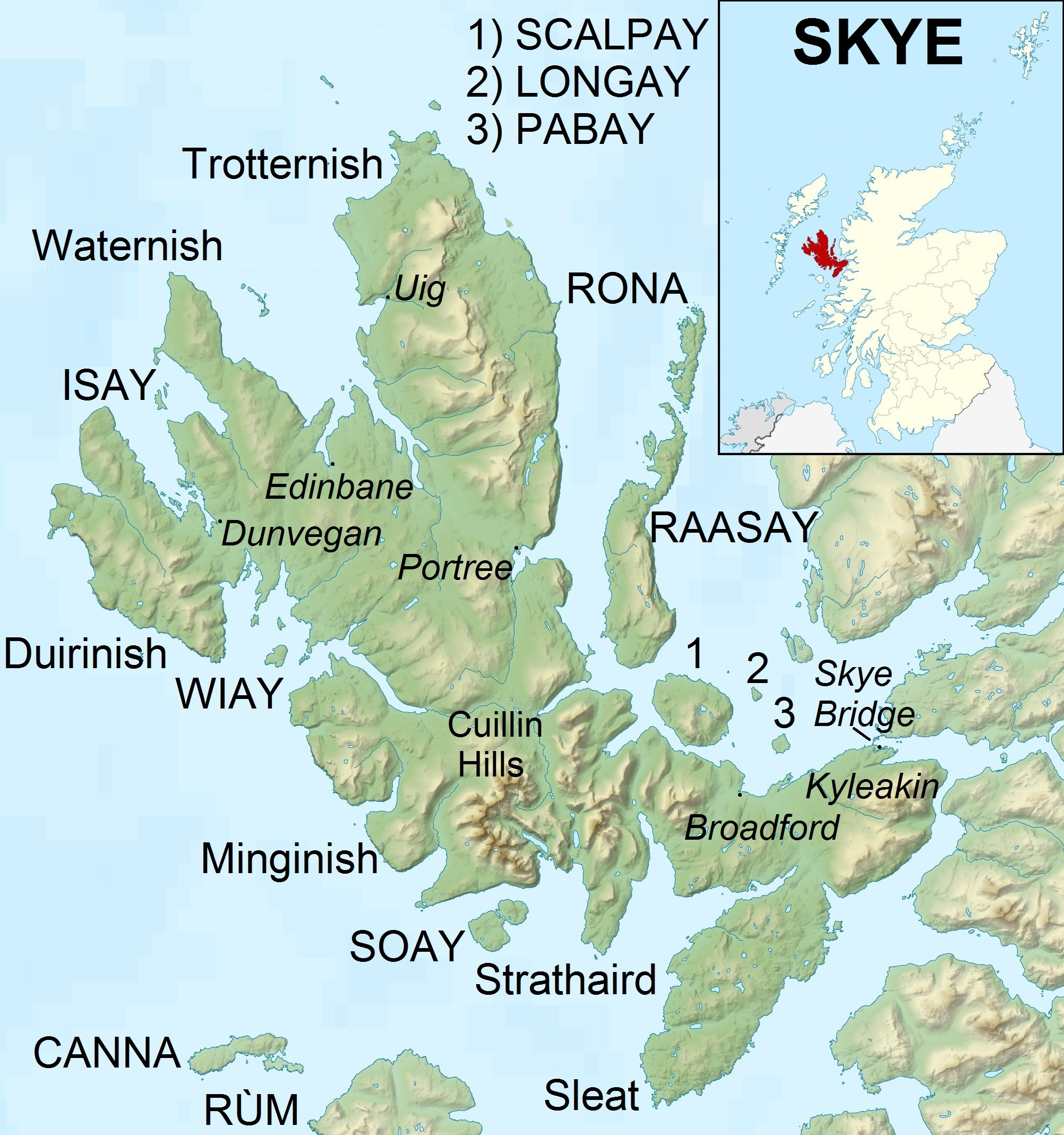
Map of Skye showing Waternish

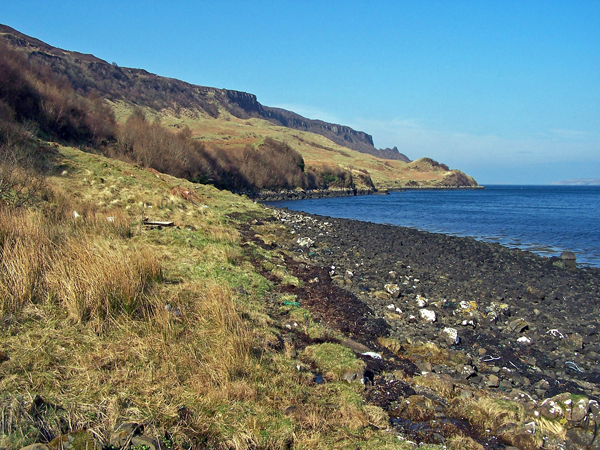
Western shore of Loch Bay

Waternish or Vaternish (Scottish Gaelic: Bhàtairnis) is a peninsula approximately 12 kilometres (7 1/2 miles) long on the island of Skye, Scotland. The peninsula is situated between Loch Dunvegan and Loch Snizort in the northwest of the island, originally inhabited and owned by Clan MacNeacail/MacNicol/Nicolsons and originally consisting of small crofting communities.

The history of the peninsula is a long (and often bloody) one involving clan feuds, massacres, de-population during the Highland Clearances, and eventual re-vitalisation.

The Clan MacLeod clan seat is at the nearby Dunvegan Castle. The current clan chief is Hugh MacLeod of MacLeod. It contains the hamlets of Stein and Lusta in Loch Bay to the south east, Halistra, Hallin and Trumpan further north and Gillen to the west, all of which are accessed from the A850 road by crossing the Fairy Bridge. The highest point is Ben Geary (284 metres or 932 feet) and the most northerly is Waternish Point. The origin of the name Waternish is controversial.

== History ==
About the time of the battle of Bannockburn in the beginning of the 14th century, the line of the MacNicol chiefs ended in an heiress, who married Torcuil MacLeod of the Lewes, a younger son of MacLeod of the Lewis, who obtained a Crown charter of the lands of Assynt, and other lands in the west of Ross, apparently those which had become vested in his MacNicol wife. The clan, on this event, came by the patriarchal rule, or law of clanship, under the leading of the nearest male heir; and the MacNicails subsequently removed to the Isle of Skye, where their chief residence was at Scoirebreac, a beautiful situation, on the margin of the loch, close to Port Rhi (Portree).

In the 17th century, John Morison of Bragar stated as much when he wrote: "... Macknaicle whose onlie daughter Torquill the first of that name (and sone to Claudius the sone of Olipheous, who likewise is said to be the King of Noruway his sone,) did violentlie espouse, and cutt off Immediatlie the whole race of Macknaicle and possessed himself with the whole Lews ...". Similarly, the garbled Bannatyne Manuscript indicates that the MacNeacails held Lewis from the Kings of Mann, and that the clan's possession of the island terminated though the marriage of an heiress to a MacLeod. The manuscript also states that a branch of the MacNeacails held Waternish on Skye before the MacLeods. Other traditions associate the MacNeacails with the mainland in Assynt and Coigach; the ruins of Caisteal Mhic Neacail ("MacNeacail's Castle") near Ullapool may well corroborate such traditions of the mainland. The MacNeacails once also had possession of Lewis before losing their lands to the MacLeods through the marriage of a MacNeacail heiress.

In Waternish, on St. Columba's Isle, at the head of Loch Snizort, there is a small chapel on the south side of the main building, which is still known as aiteadhlaic Mhic Nicail, Nicholson's Aisle; and here lies an effigy of a warrior, dressed in the ling quilted coat, or habergion; and the clogaid or conical helmet, represented in the figure of the Lord of the Isles, No. XI. It is to be regretted, that, with few expectations, in the inscriptions on those stones, numerous in the islands, are now illegible. On the island is a stone plaque that has engraved: “Saint Columba’s Island. Ancient burial ground and site of Cathedral Church of the Bishops of the Isles from 1079 to 1498. (However, in 1433, the Bishop's seat was moved to Iona and Angus, Bishop of the Isles, brother to Alexander of Islay, Earl of Ross, was buried on Iona in the Cathedral there.) Similarly ancient is the mortuary chapel, Nicolson’s Aisle, where, according to tradition, twenty-eight Chiefs of that Clan are buried.”

== Contemporary Waternish ==
Waternish now has a growing population and is home to various arts and crafts enterprises. Whilst the main industry on Waternish is tourism, there has also been a revival in recent years of crofting or small-scale agriculture.

The local school is called Knockbreck. The school has struggled recently due to an ageing population which has resulted in only 4 students currently attending and the school was scheduled for closure in summer 2015. The local pub is the Stein Inn, which dates back to 1790 and is the oldest on Skye.

Trumpan was the site of the skirmish known as the Battle of the Spoiling Dyke. The churchyard is the burial ground of Rachel Chiesley, Lady Grange.

== See also ==
- Land raid
