= Dunvegan =

Village on the Isle of Skye, Scotland

Coordinates: 57.437°N 6.581°W

Dunvegan: Scottish Gaelic: Dùn Bheagain
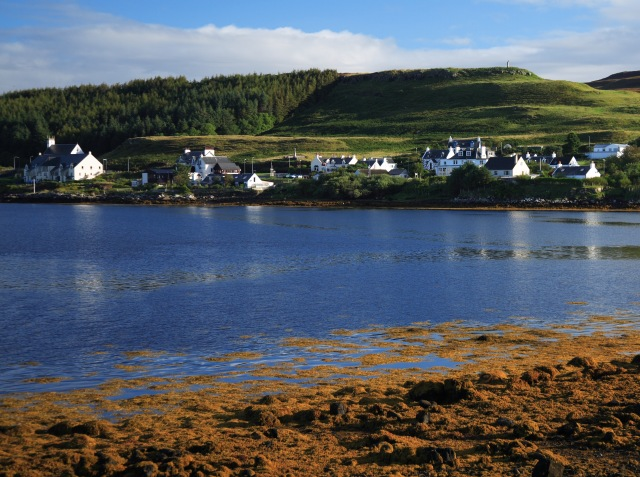
- A view of most of Dunvegan along with the Millennium Stone, visible on the skyline, overlooking the village

- Location within the Highland council area
- Area: 70 km^{2} (27 sq mi)
- Population: 386 (2011)
  - Density: 6/km^{2} (16/sq mi)
- OS grid reference: NG251477
- Civil parish: Duirinish
- Council area: Highland
- Lieutenancy area: Ross and Cromarty
- Country: Scotland
- Sovereign state: United Kingdom
- Post town: ISLE OF SKYE
- Postcode district: IV55
- Dialling code: 01470
- Police: Scotland
- Fire: Scottish
- Ambulance: Scottish
- UK Parliament: Inverness, Skye and West Ross-shire
- Scottish Parliament: Ross, Skye and Inverness West

Dunvegan (Scottish Gaelic: Dùn Bheagain) is a village on the Isle of Skye in Scotland. It is famous for Dunvegan Castle, seat of the chiefs of Clan MacLeod. Dunvegan is within the parish of Duirinish. In 2011, it had a population of 386.

== Name ==
In The Norse Influence on Gaelic Scotland (1910), George Henderson suggests that the name Dùn Bheagain derives from Old Gaelic Dùn Bheccáin ([the] fort of Beccán), Beccán being a Gaelic personal name. Dùn Bheagain would not mean 'little fort' as this would be Dùn Beag in Gaelic.

== Geography ==
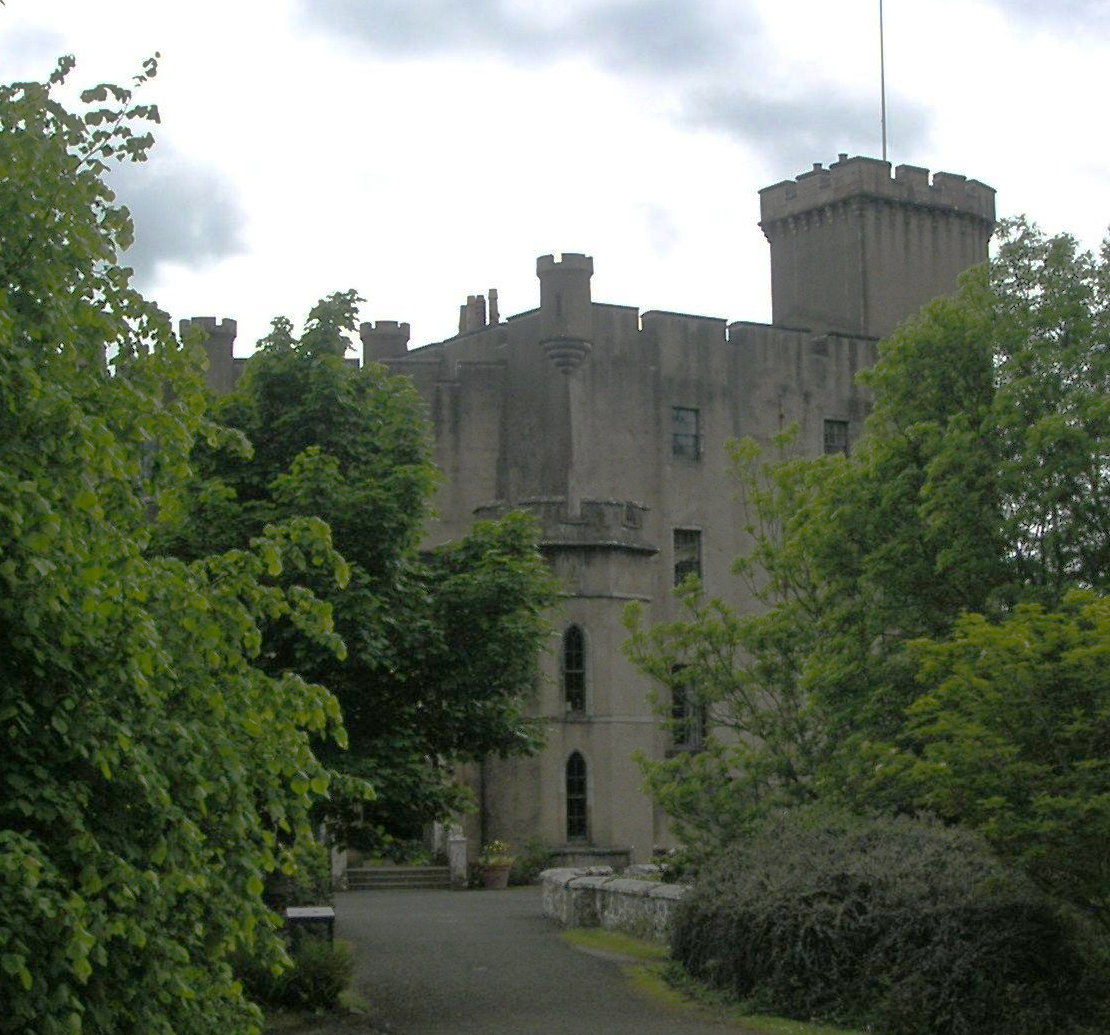
Dunvegan Castle

Dunvegan sits on the shores of the large Loch Dunvegan, and the Old School Restaurant in the village is noted for its fish, caught freshly from the loch itself. Dunvegan is situated at the junction of the A850 and the A863. The B884 road also has a junction with the A863, at the eastern end of Dunvegan.

== Demography ==
Dunvegan's permanent population is declining. However, numbers staying in the area during holidays have increased dramatically over the years since 2001.

== Economy ==
Tourist information used to be situated in the parade of shops at Lochside, but is now available on a seasonal basis at Dunvegan Castle's St Kilda Shop. The Giant MacAskill Museum, which celebrates the life of Angus Mòr MacAskill, was established in 1989 and is managed by Peter MacAskill, father of the street trials cycle rider Danny MacAskill.

== Dunvegan Parish Church ==
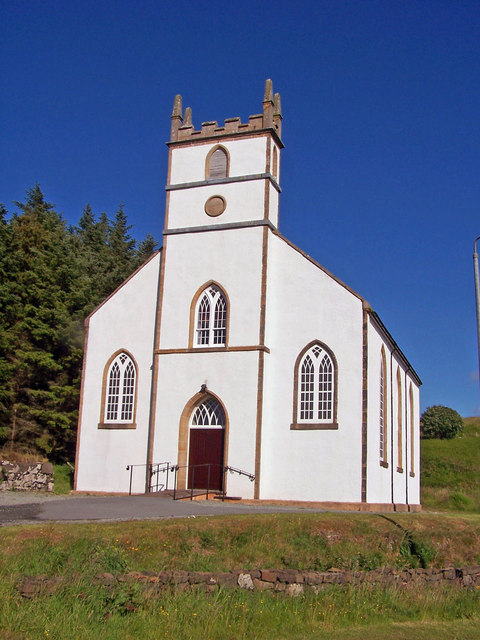
Dunvegan Parish Church

Dunvegan Parish Church, also known as Duirinish Parish Church, is located in Dunvegan. It is a Gothic Revival rectangular church with a battlemented tower, which belongs to the Church of Scotland. The church was built between 1823 and 1832 and is now a Category A listed building. Its Historic Environment Scotland listing refers to "a good set [of] sabre legged Elders' chairs".

The historic old manse for the church sits in Kinlochfollart overlooking Dunvegan Loch and is a grade C listed building.
