= Inverness-shire =

Historic county in Scotland

- Historic county
- Country: Scotland
- County town: Inverness

Area
  - Total: 4,211 sq mi (10,906 km^{2})
- Ranked 1st of 34
- Chapman code: INV
- Website: www.invernesslieutenancy.org.uk

Inverness-shire (Scottish Gaelic: Siorrachd Inbhir Nis), or the County of Inverness, is a historic county in Scotland. It is named after Inverness, its largest settlement, which was also the county town. Covering much of the Highlands and some of the Hebrides, it is Scotland's largest county by land area. It is generally rural and sparsely populated, containing only three towns which held burgh status, being Inverness, Fort William and Kingussie. The county is crossed by the Great Glen, which contains Loch Ness and separates the Grampian Mountains to the south-east from the Northwest Highlands. The county also includes Ben Nevis, the highest mountain in both Scotland and the United Kingdom.

The county ceased to be used for local government purposes in 1975. Since then, the parts of the county on the mainland and in the Inner Hebrides have been part of the Highland region, which was redesignated a council area in 1996. The Outer Hebrides parts of the county became part of the Western Isles, which since 1998 has used only the Scots Gaelic version of its name, Na h-Eileanan an Iar. The neighbouring counties prior to the 1975 reforms were (clockwise from north) Ross and Cromarty, Nairnshire, Morayshire, Banffshire, Aberdeenshire (historic), Perthshire and Argyll. The mainland part of the county had a coast to the east onto the Moray Firth, and a much longer coast to the west onto the Sea of the Hebrides.

The historic county boundaries of Inverness-shire are still used for certain functions, being a registration county. There is also an Inverness lieutenancy area which covers the mainland part of the pre-1975 county and the Small Isles, as well as the parts of the historic counties of Argyll and Moray that were transferred to Highland.

== History ==
The mainland part of Inverness-shire was anciently part of the Province of Moray, ruled by the Earls or Mormaers of Moray, sometimes as a vassal of the Scottish crown, and at other times effectively as a separate kingdom. The province was finally brought fully into the Kingdom of Scotland during the 12th century. In order to secure the Scottish crown's authority over the area, it was divided into shires, being areas administered by a sheriff. The old province of Moray was broadly split into the three shires of Elginshire, Nairnshire, and Inverness-shire, with Inverness-shire including the areas of the provincial lordships of Badenoch and Lochaber which were subordinate to Moray.

Around the same time, the Scottish crown was also trying to secure its control on Ross and Caithness (which then included Sutherland), the mainland provinces north of Moray. The Scottish crown had claimed them since 1098, when Norwegian overlordship of that area had been ceded to Scotland but, like Moray, they had remained largely independent. Whereas Moray was divided into shires at some point during the 12th century, Ross and Caithness were not made shires at that time. Instead, the Sheriff of Inverness was given authority (at least nominally) over the northern provinces too. By the mid-13th century, there were sheriffs at Cromarty and Dingwall in Ross, but the extent of their control was fairly limited, with the Sheriff of Inverness still responsible for most of Ross and Caithness. The position of Sheriff of Dingwall did not endure.

In the 15th century, the quasi-independent Lordship of the Isles was fully incorporated into the kingdom of Scotland, and the Sheriff of Inverness was then also made responsible for the Outer Hebrides and some of the Inner Hebrides, notably Skye. An act of parliament in 1504 acknowledged that the shire of Inverness was too big for the effective administration of justice, and so declared Ross and Caithness to be separate shires. That act was set aside for most purposes in 1509; the northern areas eventually regained their independence from the sheriff of Inverness with the creation of the shires of Sutherland in 1633, Caithness in 1641, and Ross-shire in 1661. Ross-shire also included the northern Outer Hebrides, notably the Isle of Lewis. After 1661, Inverness-shire therefore comprised the western part of the province of Moray on the mainland, the southern Outer Hebrides, and some of the Inner Hebrides.

Over time, Scotland's shires became more significant than the old provinces, with more administrative functions being given to the sheriffs. In 1667 Commissioners of Supply were established for each shire, which would serve as the main administrative body for the area until the creation of county councils in 1890. Following the Acts of Union in 1707, the English term 'county' came to be used interchangeably with the older term 'shire'.

In 1870, Cromdale and Grantown-on-Spey were transferred from Inverness-shire to Elginshire in exchange for the area around Aviemore.

=== Inverness-shire County Council ===
Elected county councils were established in 1890 under the Local Government (Scotland) Act 1889, taking most of the functions of the commissioners (which were eventually abolished in 1930). The burgh of Inverness was deemed capable of providing its own county-level local government functions, and so it was excluded from the administrative area of the county council, although the county council still chose to base itself there. Inverness-shire County Council held its first meeting on 22 May 1890 in the county's main courthouse at Inverness Castle, which had been rebuilt in 1836.

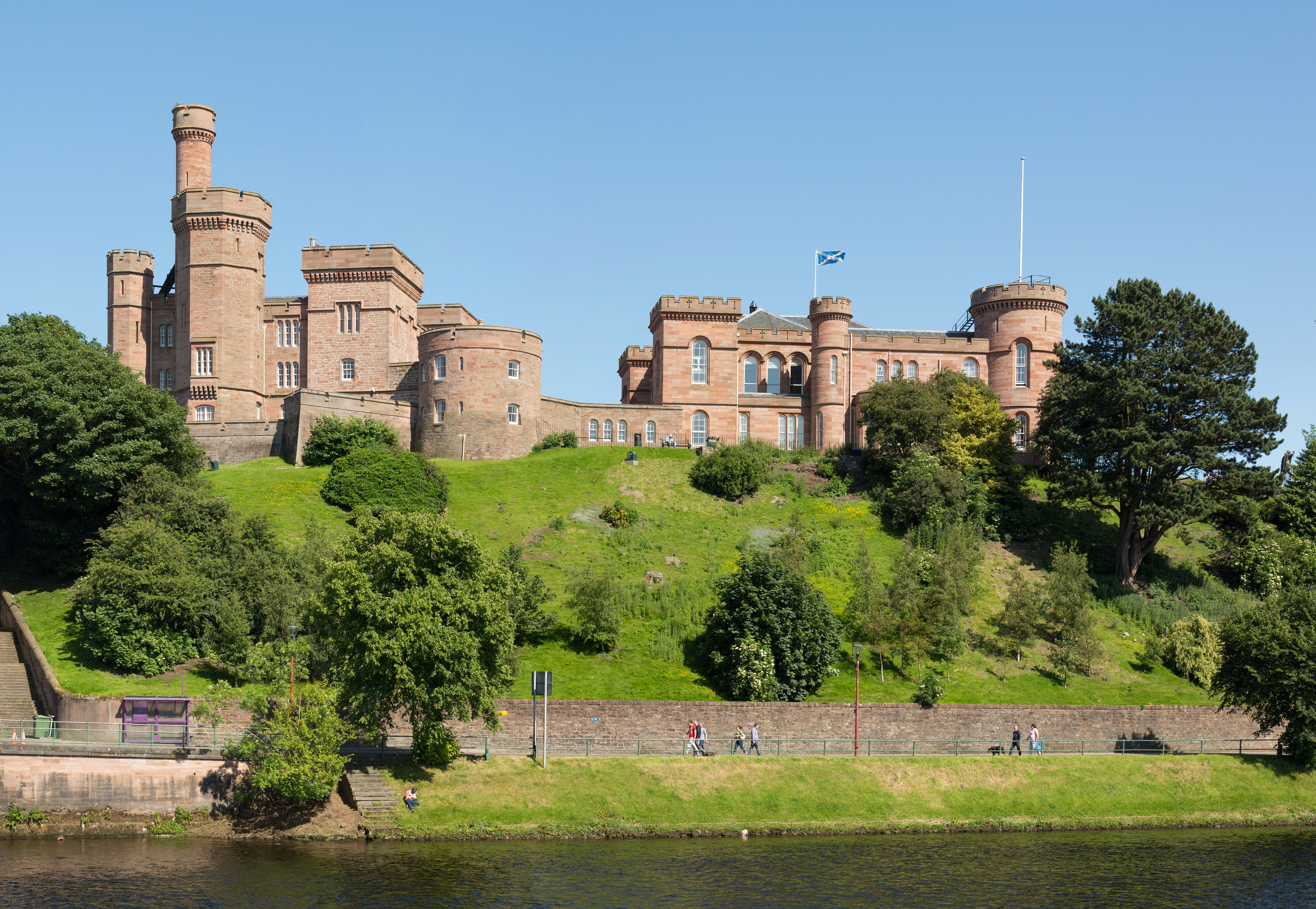
Inverness Castle

The 1889 act also led to a review of boundaries, with exclaves being transferred to a county they actually bordered, and parish and county boundaries being adjusted to eliminate cases where parishes straddled county boundaries. There were several such changes affecting the boundaries of Inverness-shire. Notable changes included gaining the Small Isles of Canna, Muck and Rùm from Argyll. Exceptionally, the parish of Croy and Dalcross was allowed to continue to straddle Inverness-shire and Nairnshire. The boundary changes all took effect in 1891.

Inverness was subsequently brought within the administrative area of the county council in 1930, but classed as a large burgh, allowing the town council to continue to provide most local government services.

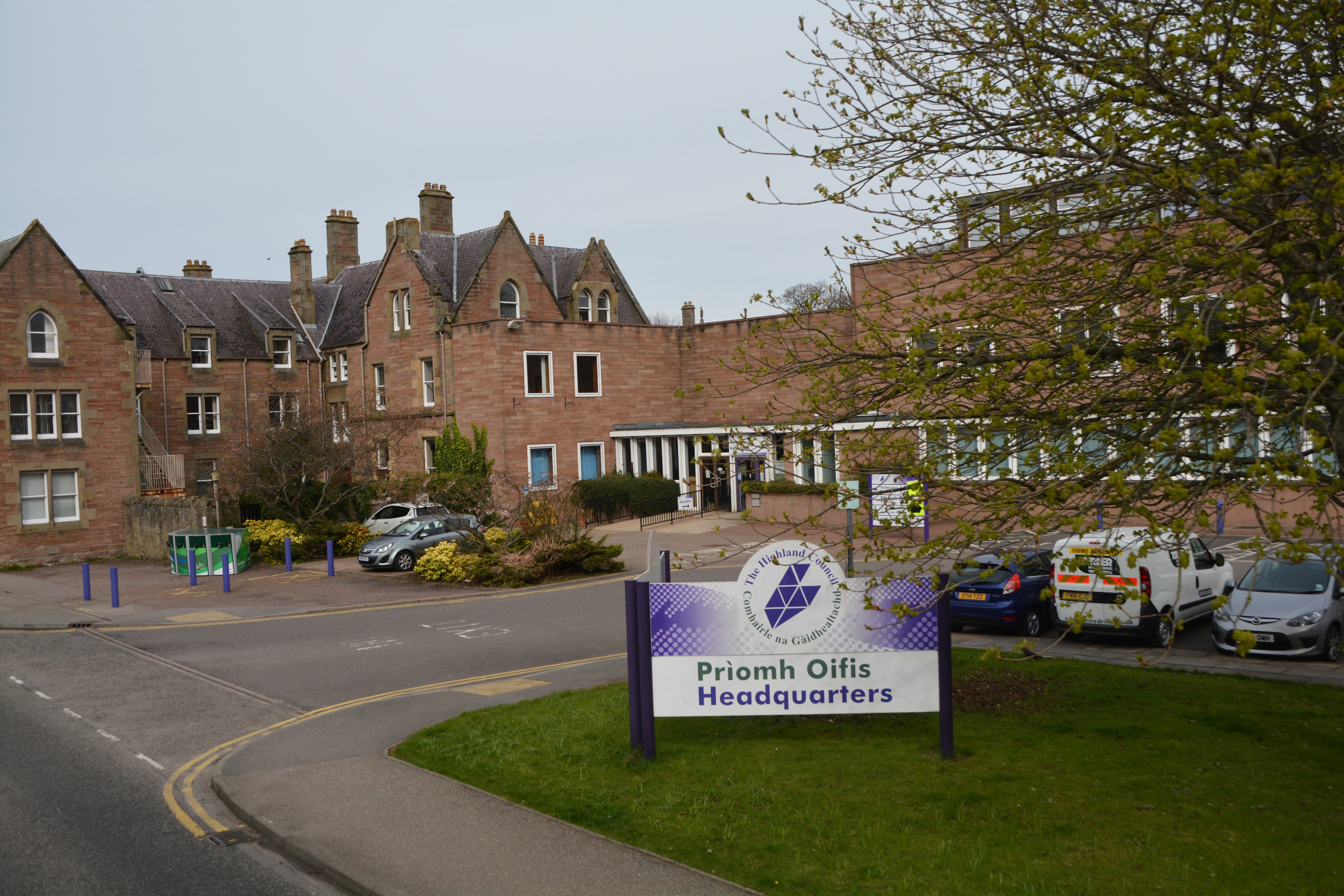
County Buildings, Glenurquhart Road, Inverness: County Council's main offices. 1876 former school building to left, 1963 extension to right.

From the 1930s onwards the county council used the former Inverness College building at the corner of Ardross Street and Glenurquhart Road (built 1876) as its offices, renaming it County Buildings. The building was substantially extended in 1963 to provide additional offices, but council meetings continued to be held at Inverness Castle until the county council's abolition in 1975.

In 1955 the UK Government claimed sovereignty over Rockall, an uninhabited islet in the North Atlantic Ocean, which lies 301 kilometres (187 statute miles; 163 nautical miles) west of St Kilda. Under the Island of Rockall Act 1972, Rockall was assigned to the Harris district of Inverness-shire. The UK claim on Rockall is disputed, particularly by Ireland.

=== Since 1975 ===
Local government was reformed in 1975 under the Local Government (Scotland) Act 1973, which replaced Scotland's counties, burghs and landward districts with a two-tier structure of upper-tier regions and lower-tier districts for most of Scotland. A single-tier structure of island areas was used for Orkney, Shetland and the Western Isles. The mainland and Inner Hebrides parts of Inverness-shire became part of the Highland Region, whilst the Outer Hebrides parts (the districts of Barra, Harris, North Uist and South Uist) became part of the Western Isles.

The parts of Inverness-shire which went to the Highland Region were split between four lower-tier districts:

- Badenoch and Strathspey district, covering the burgh of Kingussie and district of Badenoch from Inverness-shire, plus the burgh of Grantown-on-Spey and Cromdale district from Moray.
- Inverness district, covering the burgh of Inverness and districts of Aird and Inverness.
- Lochaber district, covering the burgh of Fort William and district of Lochaber (which included the Small Isles) from Inverness-shire, plus the Ardnamurchan district and Ballachulish and Kinlochleven electoral divisions from Argyll.
- Skye and Lochalsh district, covering the Skye district from Inverness-shire, plus the South West District from Ross and Cromarty.

Prior to 1975, each county had appointed a lord-lieutenant. As part of the 1975 reforms, new lieutenancy areas were established instead. Inverness-shire was split between three lieutenancy areas:

- Inverness, covering the combined area of the new Badenoch and Strathspey, Inverness, and Lochaber districts (which included all the mainland parts of pre-1975 Inverness-shire).
- Ross and Cromarty, covering both the Skye and Lochalsh district and the neighbouring Ross and Cromarty district.
- Western Isles.

The last Lord Lieutenant of the county, Donald Hamish Cameron of Lochiel, became Lord Lieutenant of the new Inverness lieutenancy area.

Further local government reforms in 1996 under the Local Government etc. (Scotland) Act 1994 saw the regions and districts created in 1975 abolished and replaced with single-tier council areas. The former Highland region became one of the new council areas. The lieutenancy areas continue to be defined as they had been in 1975 despite the abolition of the districts on which they were based. The boundaries of the historic county of Inverness-shire (as it was following the 1891 boundary changes) are still used for some limited official purposes connected with land registration, being a registration county.

In 1998 the Western Isles Council formally changed the English language version of the area's name from Western Isles to Na h-Eileanan an Iar (Scots Gaelic for 'Western Isles'), to be used in both English and Gaelic contexts.

== Geography ==
Inverness-shire is Scotland's largest historic county by land area. At the 1921 census it was reported to have an area of 4,211 square miles (10,910 km^{2}). Of the historic counties in the UK as a whole, only Yorkshire was larger.

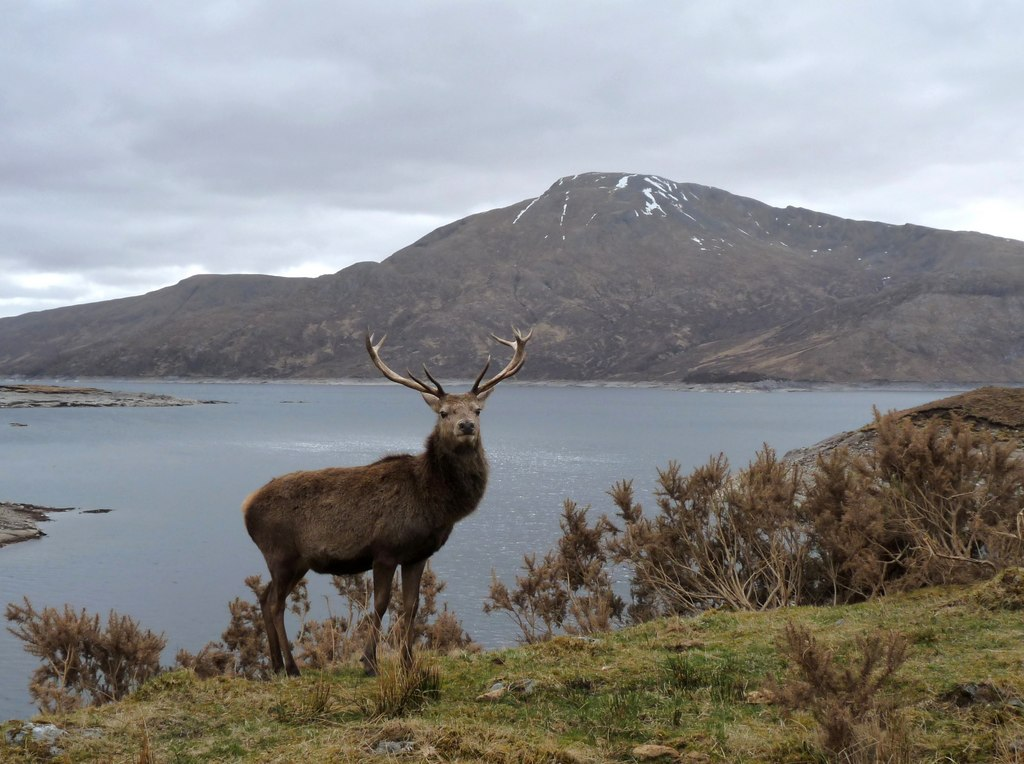
Loch Quoich

Its mainland section covers a large area of the Highlands, bordering the Sea of the Hebrides to the west and Beauly Firth and Moray Firth to the east which provide access to the North Sea. It is split into two by the Great Glen, a roughly 60-mile geological fault which runs south-west to north-east and divides the Northwest Highlands to the west from the Grampian Mountains (including the Monadhliath Mountains) to the east. The glen contains the notable lochs of Loch Ness (Scotland's second largest), Loch Oich, and Loch Lochy, which are connected by the Caledonian Canal. The Great Glen opens to the south-west into the sea loch of Loch Linnhe.

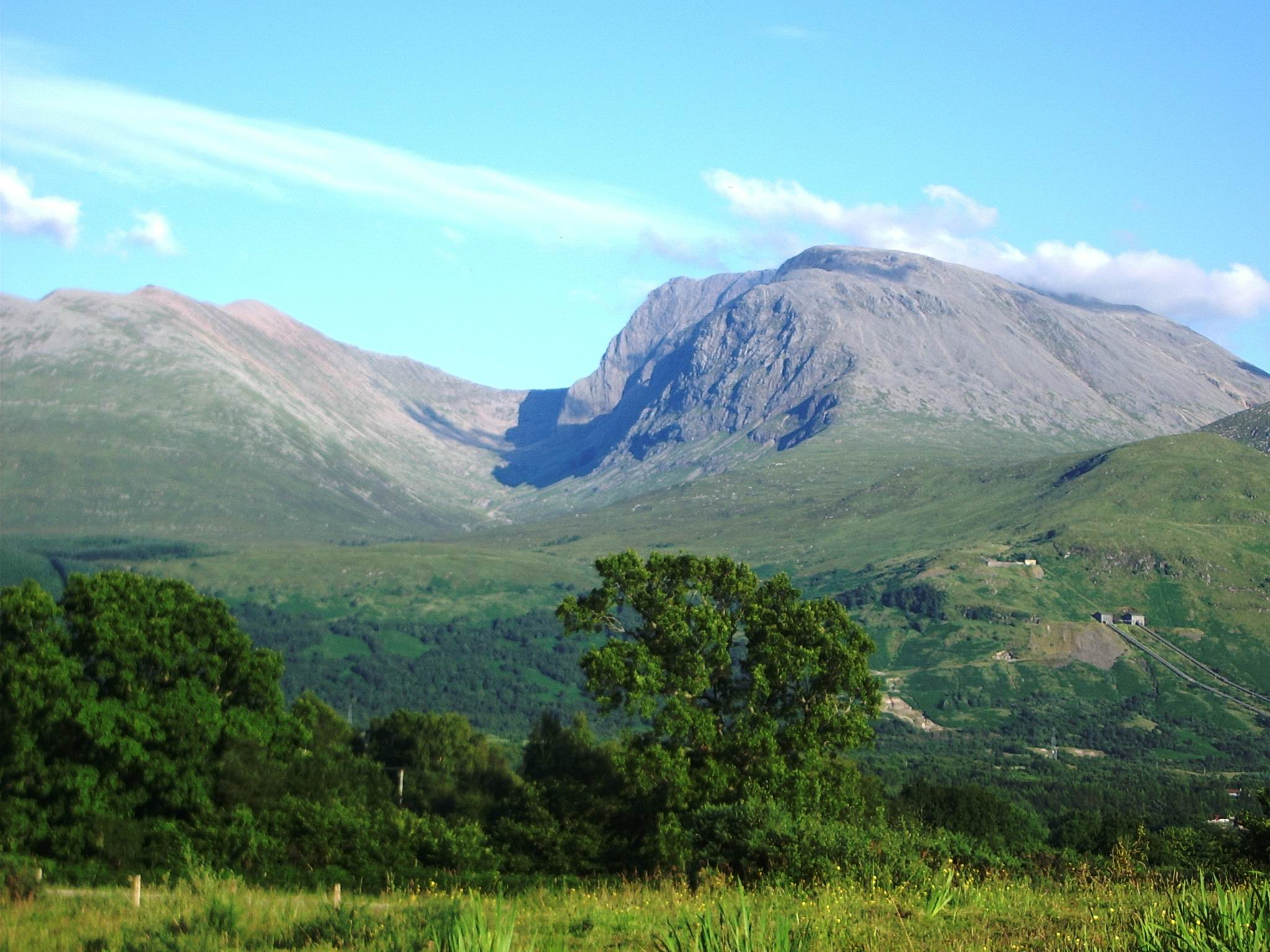
Ben Nevis, Britain's tallest mountain

Ben Nevis, the tallest peak in Britain, is located to the east of Fort William. The west coast consists of a number of peninsulas divided by long sea loch inlets; north to south these are the Glenelg peninsula (shared with Ross-shire), Loch Hourn, Knoydart peninsula, Loch Nevis, North and South Morar/Arisaig peninsula, Loch Ailort, Moidart peninsula and Loch Moidart. The west coast of Inverness-shire was traditionally referred to as the Rough Bounds due to its remoteness and inaccessibility. It remains wild and sparsely populated today.

The terrain in Inverness-shire is generally mountainous, with numerous lochs scattered throughout the county. Some of the lochs have been enlarged to use as reservoirs. The larger inland lochs are: (Note: Being the lochs (excluding sea lochs) shown on modern Ordnance Survey 1:50,000 maps labelled in all capital letters.)

- Blackwater Reservoir
- Loch Arkaig
- Loch Cluanie
- Loch Ericht
- Loch Garry
- Loch Laggan
- Loch Lochy
- Loch Loyne
- Loch Mhor
- Loch Morar
- Loch Mullardoch
- Loch Ness
- Loch Oich
- Loch Ossian
- Loch Quoich or Cuaich
- Loch Shiel
- Loch Treig
- Lochan na h-Earba

=== Islands ===
Inverness-shire contains numerous small islands off its west coast which form part of the Inner Hebrides. The largest of these is Skye, separated from the Inverness-shire mainland by the Sound of Sleat. It is the second largest island in Scotland and has numerous peninsulas and offshore islands.

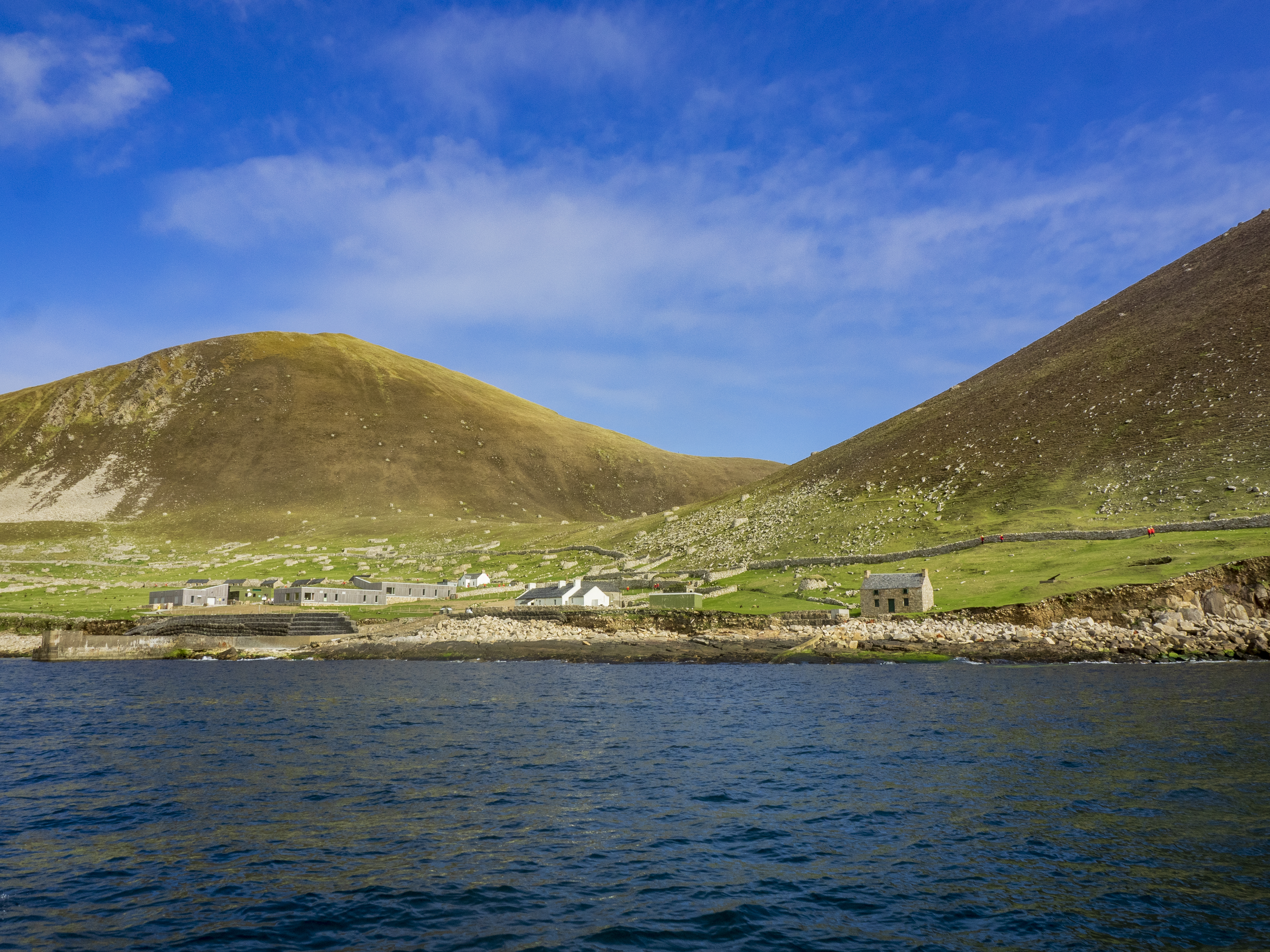
Village Bay on Hirta, the main island of St Kilda, from which the last permanent residents were evacuated in 1930

To the west, across the Little Minch, most of the Outer Hebrides fall within the county, with the notable exception of Lewis which is in Ross-shire. Further west still lie the remote islands of St Kilda, which have been uninhabited since 1930. Much further west, 230 miles from the Outer Hebrides, lies the extremely remote, uninhabitable island of Rockall, which is subject to a territorial dispute with Ireland.

The Small Isles were historically split between Inverness-shire and Argyll, with Eigg in Inverness-shire and the others (Canna, Muck and Rùm) in Argyll. As the Small Isles formed a single parish, the 1891 boundary review charged with placing parishes in a single county opted to place the whole parish in Inverness-shire.

==== Inner Hebrides ====
There are eleven islands in the Inner Hebrides that were in Inverness-shire prior to 1975 and were inhabited at the 2011 census. These are islands as defined by National Records of Scotland; some are tidal islands or have fixed links (bridges / causeways) to the mainland or other islands.

- Canna
- Eigg
- Eilean Shona
- Muck
- Raasay
- Rona
- Rùm
- Sanday
- Scalpay
- Skye
- Soay
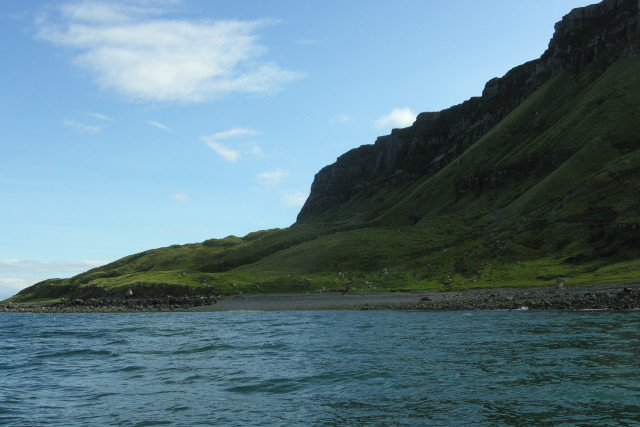
Coast of Eigg

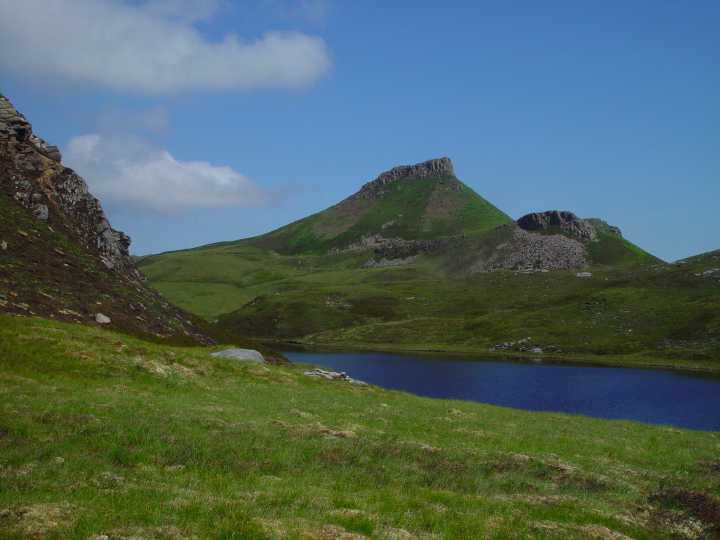
Dùn Caan mountain on Raasay

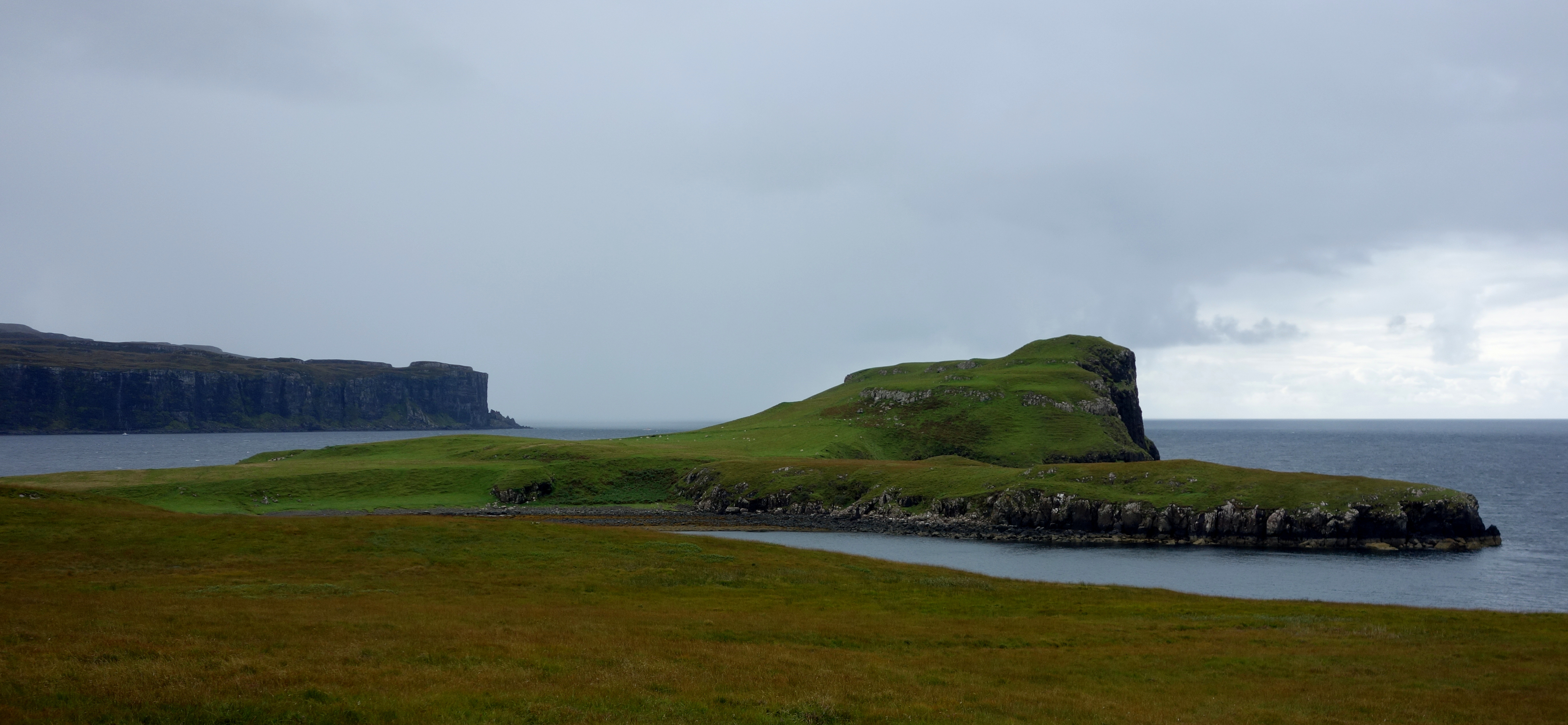
Oronsay, off Skye

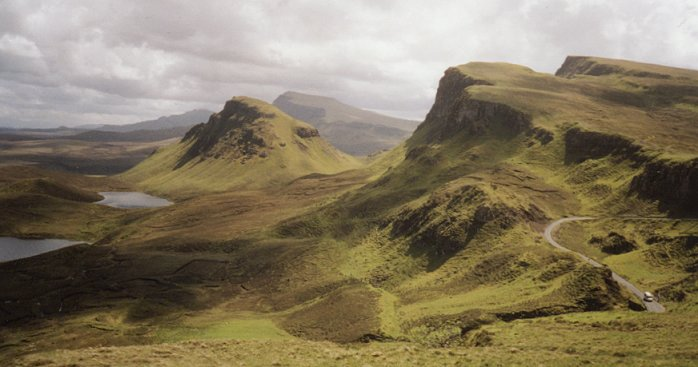
Landscape of northern Skye

==== Outer Hebrides ====
There are thirteen islands in the Outer Hebrides that were in Inverness-shire prior to 1975 and were inhabited at the 2011 census.

- Baleshare
- Barra
- Benbecula
- Berneray
- Eriskay
- Flodaigh
- Grimsay (north)
- Grimsay (south)
- Harris (part of the larger Lewis and Harris island)
- North Uist
- Scalpay
- South Uist
- Vatersay
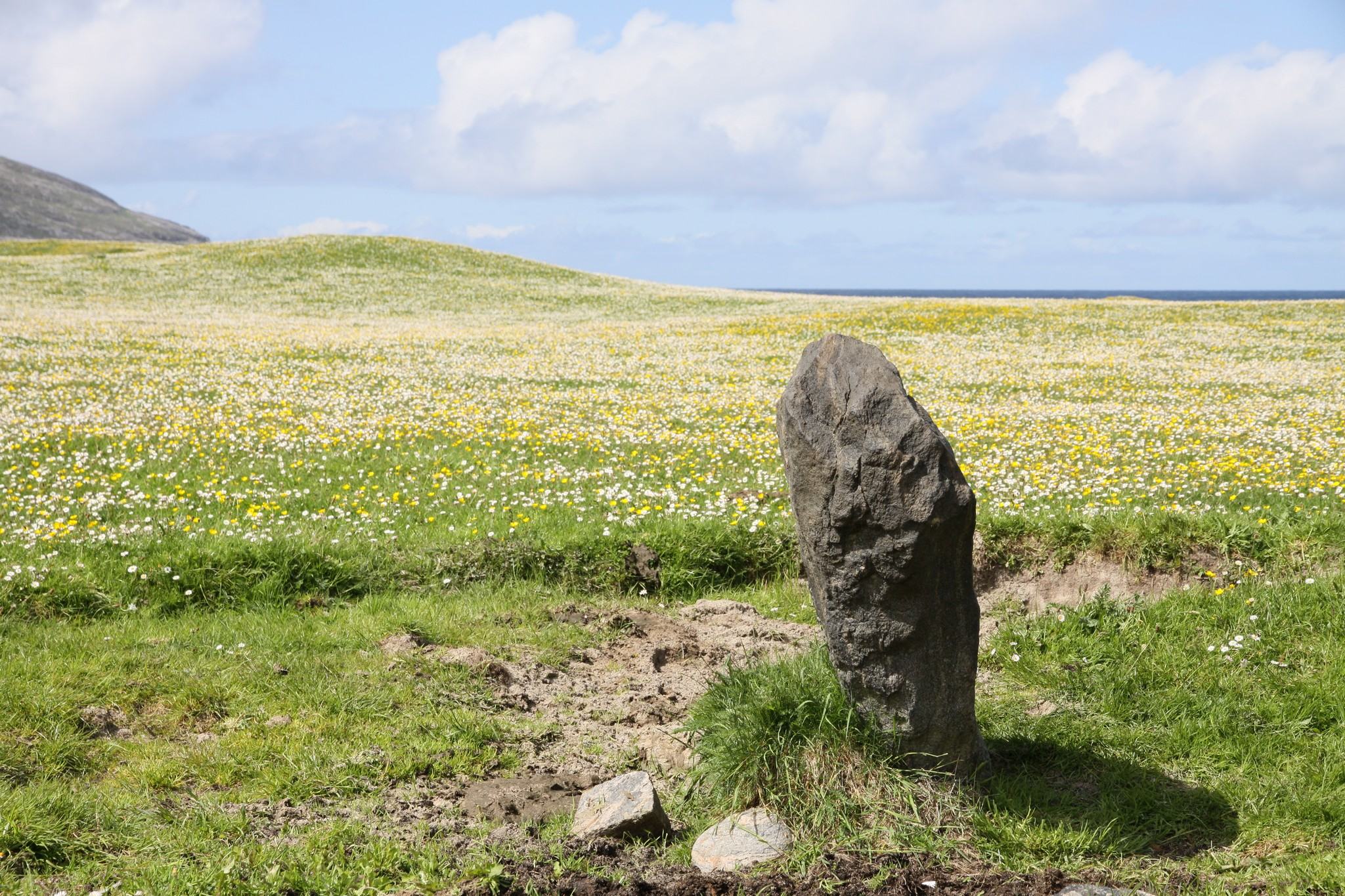
Standing stone on Barra

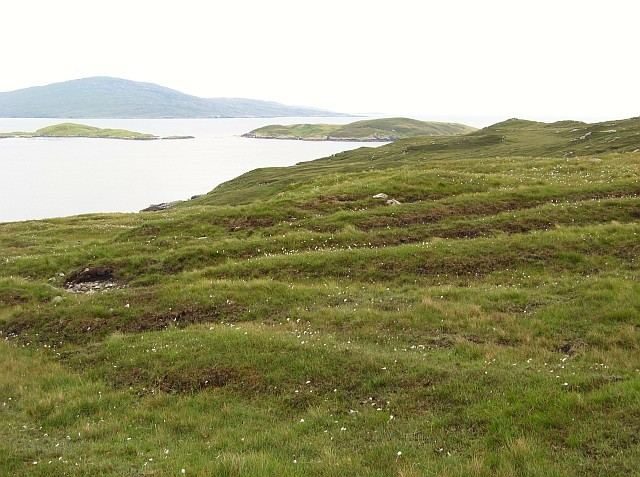
The 'lazy beds' of Harris

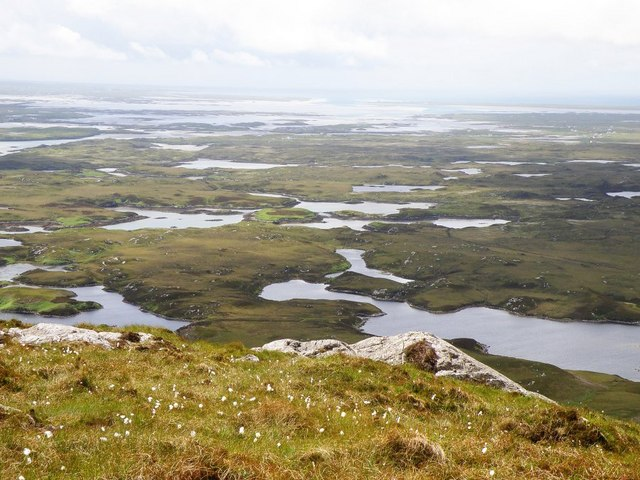
Lakes of North Uist

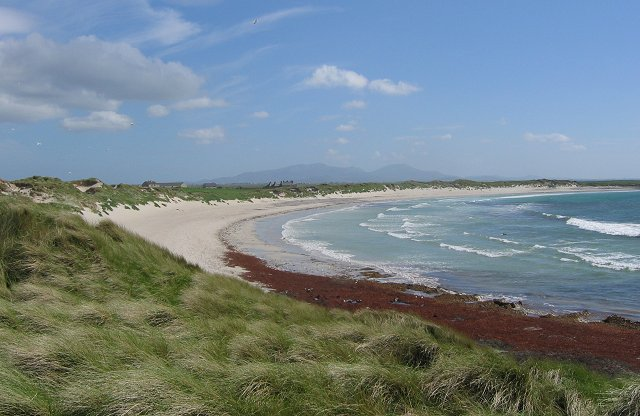
Beach on Benbecula

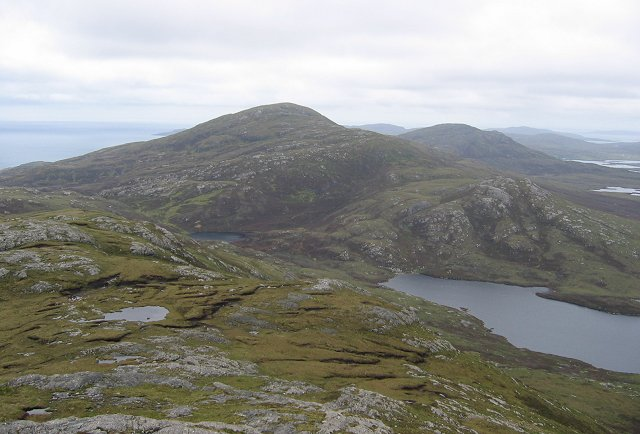
Mountains on South Uist

== Coat of arms ==
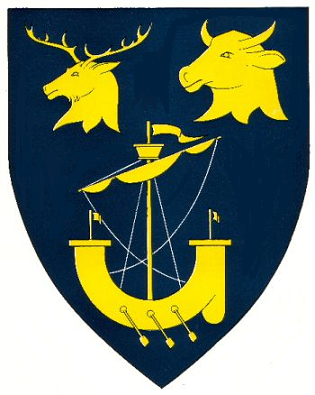
Arms of the former county council

Inverness-shire County Council was granted a coat of arms in 1927, based on the design of the council's official seal. The blazon read:

Azure, in sinister chief a stag's head and in dexter chief a bull's head both erased and in base a galley, sails furled, oars in action and flagged, all Or. Beneath the shield is an escrol bearing this motto: Air son Math na Siorrachd.

The galley represents Clan Chattan, who aligned themselves under the banner of Somerled, Lord of the Isles. The stag's head comes from the crest of the Frasers of Lovat, while the bull's head comes from the crest of the MacLeods of that Ilk. The motto is in Gaelic and means "For the Good of the County".

== Civil parishes ==
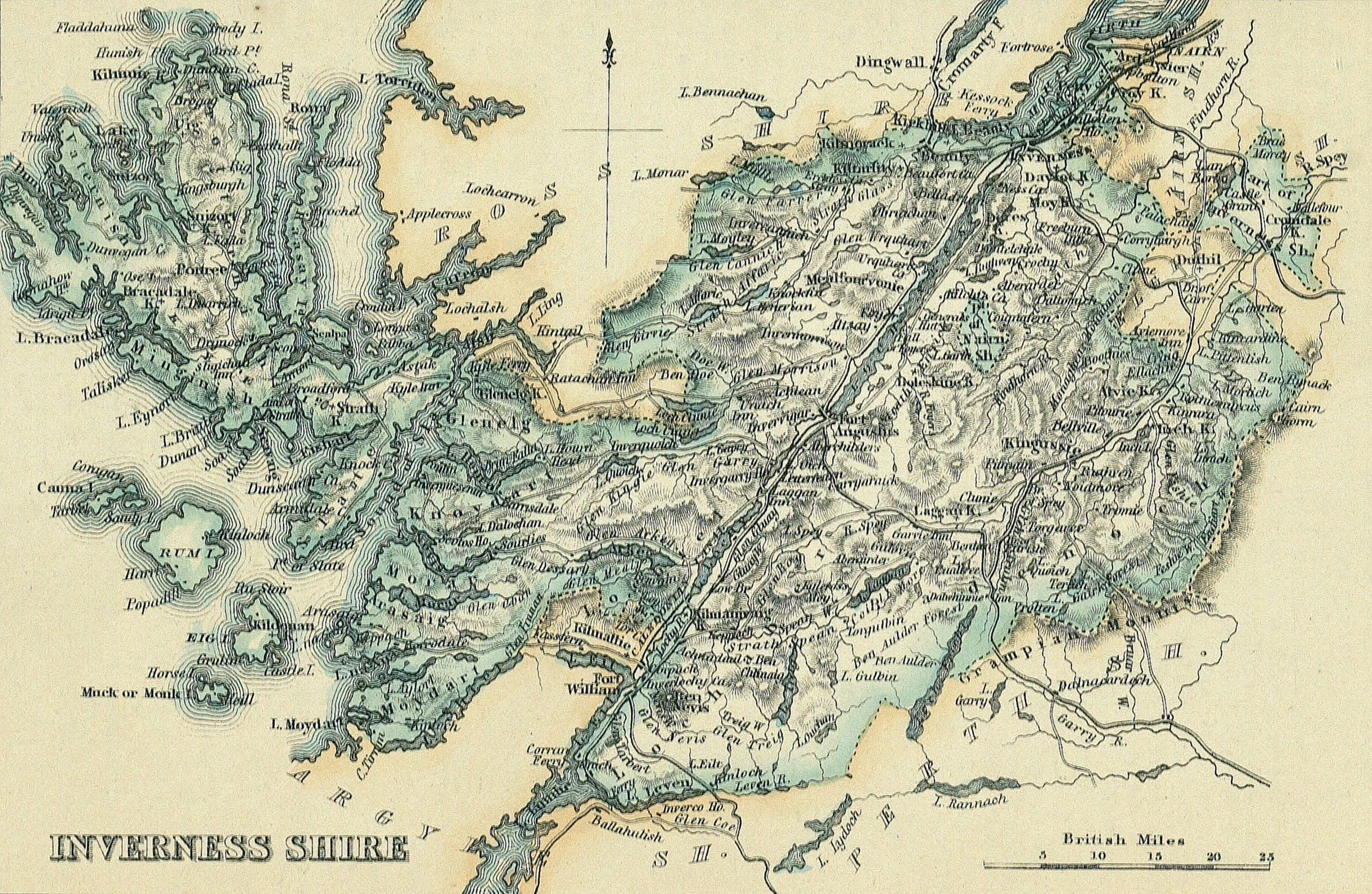
Map of Inverness-shire

Civil parishes are still used for some statistical purposes, and separate census figures are published for them. As their areas have been largely unchanged since the 19th century this allows for comparison of population figures over an extended period. Parishes had parish boards from 1845 to 1894 and then parish councils from 1894 to 1930. They have had no administrative functions since 1930.

In 1854 there had been 36 civil parishes, seven of which had straddled county boundaries. Following the 1891 boundary changes, which sought to eliminate cases where parishes straddled county boundaries, there were 33 parishes in the county.

- Abernethy and Kincardine
- Alvie
- Ardersier
- Arisaig and Moidart
- Barra
- Boleskine and Abertarff
- Bracadale (on Skye)
- Croy and Dalcross (straddled border with Nairnshire)
- Daviot and Dunlichity
- Dores
- Duirinish (on Skye)
- Duthil and Rothiemurchus
- Glenelg
- Harris
- Inverness and Bona
- Kilmallie
- Kilmonivaig
- Kilmorack
- Kilmuir (on Skye)
- Kiltarlity and Convinth
- Kingussie and Insh
- Kirkhill
- Laggan
- Moy and Dalarossie
- North Uist
- Petty
- Portree (on Skye)
- Sleat (on Skye)
- Small Isles
- Snizort (on Skye)
- South Uist
- Strath (on Skye)
- Urquhart and Glenmoriston

Many changes have taken place since the Reformation period:

- North Uist was a union of the ancient parishes of Kilmuir and Sand; South Uist of the parishes of Benbecula, Howmore, and Kilpeter.
- Croy and Dalcross, and Kiltarlity and Convinth, were united c. 1500.
- Abernethy and Kincardine, and Urquhart and Glenmoriston, were united at the Reformation. At the same time Petty was formed by the union of the ancient parishes of Petyn and Bracholy (or Brackley).
- Boleskine and Abertarff, and Inverness and Bona, and Daviot and Dunlichity, were united in 1618. At the same time Kirkhill was formed by a union of the ancient parishes of Wardlaw and Farnua.
- Duthil and Rothiemurchus were united in 1630.
- Small Isles was created from Sleat in 1726; unusually, there was no parish church and the congregation met in the schoolhouse on Eigg. There are some indications that Canna and Kildonan (Eigg) may have been medieval parishes at an earlier date.
- In 1895 the parish of Arisaig and Moidart were created out of Ardnamurchan parish, the rest of which lay in Argyll. Arisaig (a.k.a. Kilmorie) and another parish, Eilean Fhianain, were medieval parishes united to Ardnamurchan at the Reformation.
- Portree was created out of parts of Snizort and Kilmuir parishes in 1726.
- Kingussie and Insh, and Moy and Dalarossie, were united at an unknown date.
- Minginish (Skye) was absorbed into Bracadale; Trumpan was absorbed into Duirinish; Uig was absorbed into Snizort; Rodel was absorbed into Harris; Kilmaluoc (Raasay) was absorbed into Snizort or Kilmuir.

== Transport ==
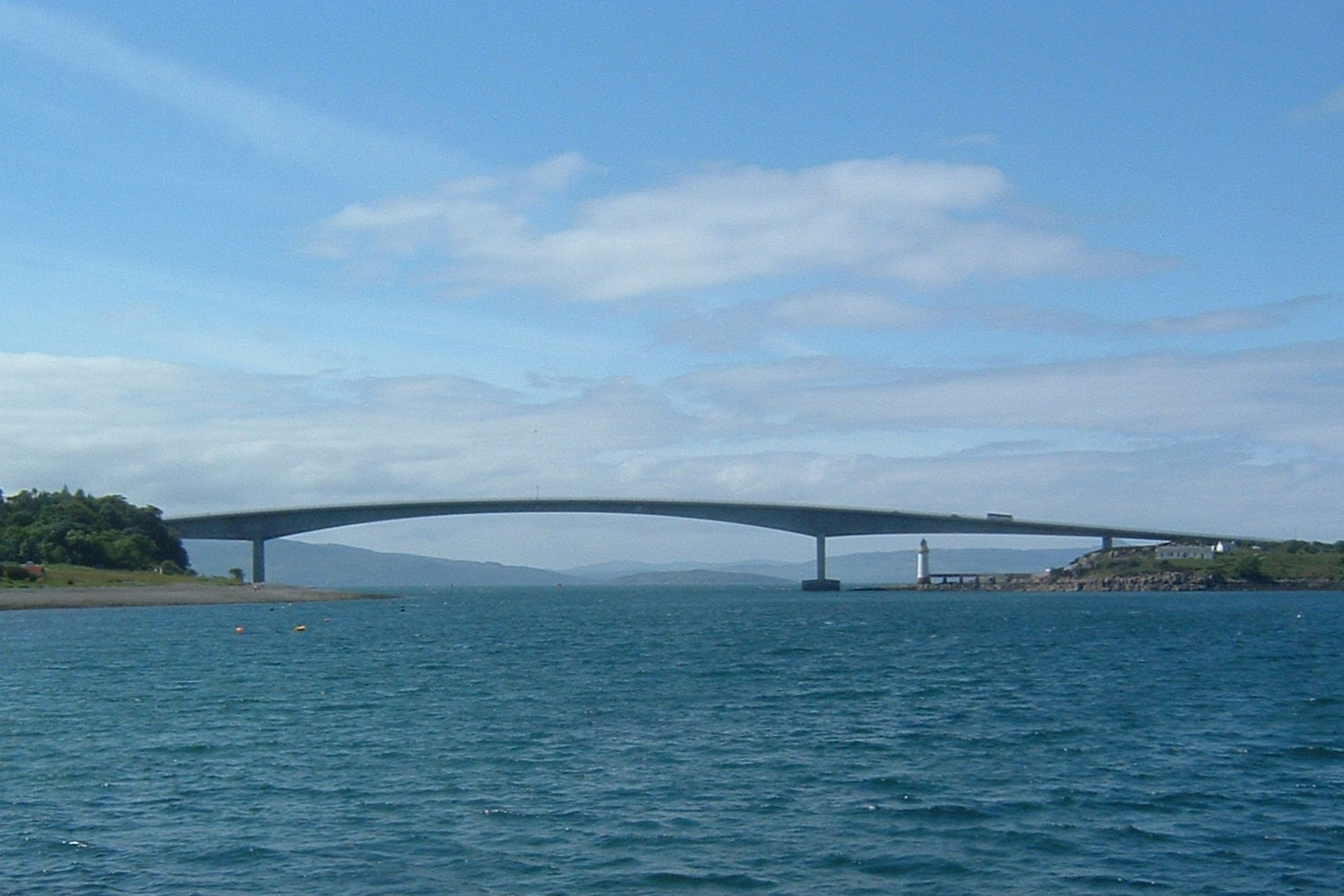
The Skye Bridge, opened 1995

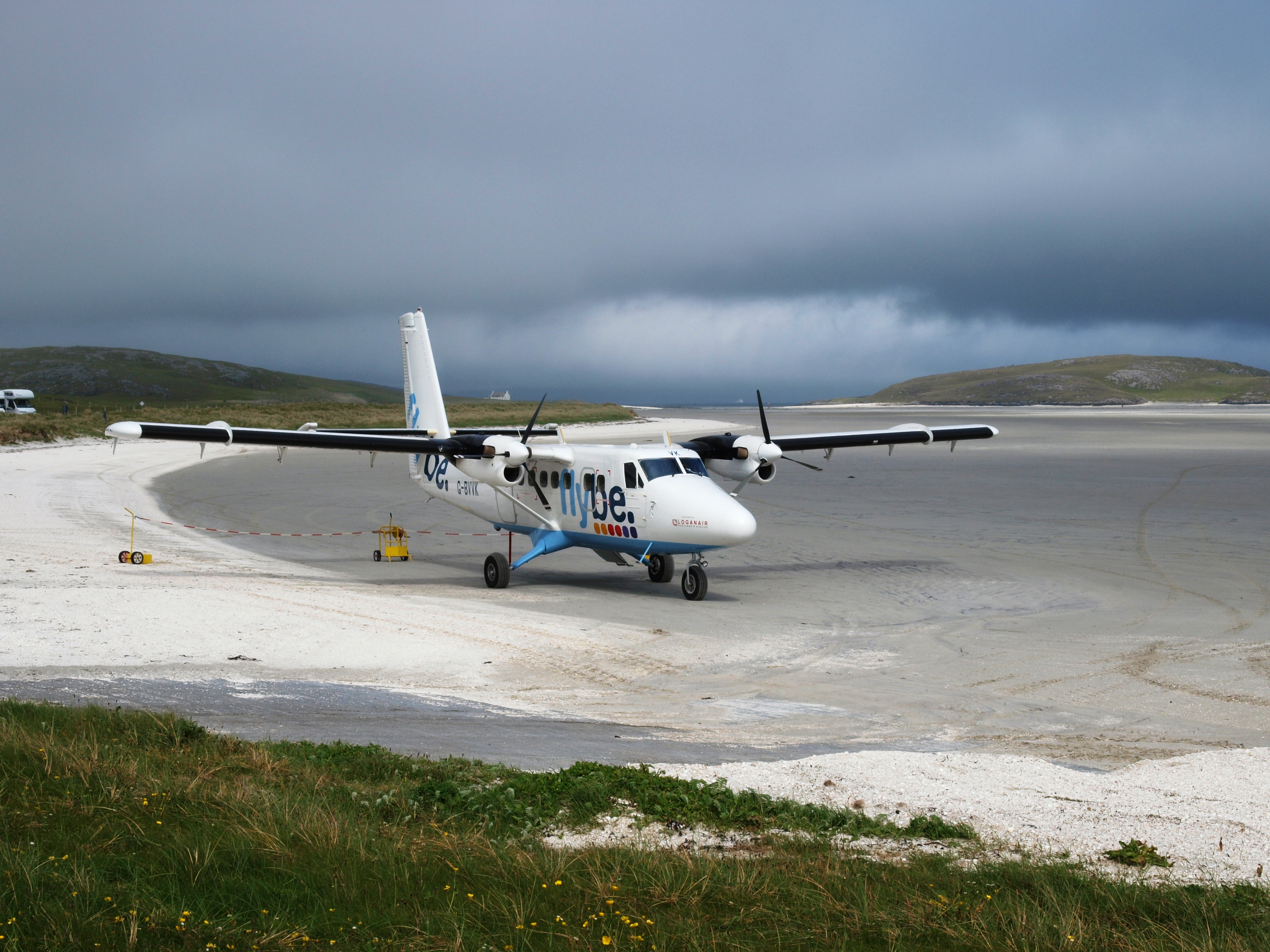
Barra's unique beach airport runway

The Highland Main Line connects Inverness by rail to Perth to the south, Kyle of Lochalsh to the west, and Thurso/Wick to the north. The West Highland Line connects Fort William to Mallaig. The Inverness to Aberdeen main line also serves Nairn within the Highland Council's area.

The Isle of Skye is connected to the mainland by a bridge from Kyle of Lochalsh in Ross-shire.

Various bus companies serve the larger towns of the county, such as Stagecoach Group and Scottish Citylink. Shiel Buses operate local buses in the Fort William area. Stagecoach operates several bus routes on the Isle of Skye.

Numerous ferries connect the islands of the Outer Hebrides, the Inner Hebrides, and the Scottish Mainland.

There are three airports in the county: Inverness, Benbecula, and Barra. All three operate flights within Scotland, with Inverness also providing flights to other cities in the UK as well as some destinations in Europe. Barra Airport is famous within aviation circles as it is the only airport in the world where scheduled flights use a beach as the runway.

== Settlements ==
=== Mainland ===
- Abriachan
- The Aird
- Altrua
- Ardersier
- Arisaig
- Aviemore
- Ballifeary
- Balloch
- Balnafettack
- Beauly
- Boat of Garten
- Bught
- Cannich
- Carrbridge
- Clachnaharry
- Cradlehall
- Crown
- Croy
- Culcabock
- Culduthel
- Culloden
- Dalneigh
- Dalwhinnie
- Dores
- Drakies
- Drumnadrochit
- Dulnain Bridge
- Fort Augustus
- Fort William
- Foyers
- Glenelg
- Glenfinnan
- Highbridge
- Hilton
- Holm
- Inchmore
- Insh
- Inshes
- Inverfarigaig
- Invergarry
- Inverie
- Inverlochy
- Invermoriston
- Kiltarlity
- Kincraig
- Kingussie
- Kinmylies
- Kirkhill
- Laggan, Badenoch
- Laggan, Great Glen
- Leachkin
- Lochailort
- Lochardil
- Longman
- Mallaig
- Merkinch
- Millburn
- Milton of Leys
- Morar
- Moy
- Muir of Ord (shared with Ross-shire)
- Muirtown
- Nethy Bridge
- Newtonmore
- North Ballachulish
- Onich
- Raigmore
- Roybridge
- Scorguie
- Smithton
- South Kessock
- Spean Bridge
- Struy
- Tomatin
- Tomich
- Westhill

=== Islands ===
- Achachork (Skye)
- Aird of Sleat (Skye)
- Allasdale (Barra)
- Amhuinnsuidhe (Harris)
- Ardhasaig (Harris)
- Ardheisker (North Uist)
- Ardmore (Barra)
- Ardvasar (Skye)
- Ardveenish (Barra)
- Armadale (Skye)
- Ashaig (Skye)
- Askernish (South Uist)
- Auratote (South Uist)
- Bail' Iochdrach (Benbecula)
- Baile Glas (Grimsay)
- Balgarva (South Uist)
- Balivanich (Benbecula)
- Bernisdale (Skye)
- Bogach (Barra)
- Bornesketaig (Skye)
- Boreraig (Skye)
- Bornish (South Uist)
- Borreraig (Skye)
- Borrodale (Skye)
- Borsham (Harris)
- Borve (Barra)
- Borve (Harris)
- Borve (Skye)
- Bracadale (Skye)
- Brevig (Barra)
- Broadford (Skye)
- Brogaig (Skye)
- Bualintur (Skye)
- Camastianavaig (Skye)
- Camuscross (Skye)
- Caolas (Vatersay)
- Carbost (Loch Harport, Skye)
- Carbost (Trotternish, Skye)
- Carinish (North Uist)
- Castlebay (Barra)
- Claigan (Skye)
- Cleadale (Eigg)
- Colbost (Skye)
- Daliburgh (South Uist)
- Drumfearn (Skye)
- Drynoch (Skye)
- Dunan (Skye)
- Duntulm (Skye)
- Dunvegan (Skye)
- Edinbane (Skye)
- Elgol (Skye)
- Ellishadder (Skye)
- Eynort (Skye)
- Eyre (Skye)
- Fasach (Skye)
- Feorlig (Skye)
- Ferindonald (Skye)
- Fiskavaig (Skye)
- Flashader (Skye)
- Flodigarry (Skye)
- Galmisdale (Eigg)
- Galtrigill (Skye)
- Garafad (Skye)
- Geary (Skye)
- Gedintailor (Skye)
- Gillen (Skye)
- Glendale (Skye)
- Halistra (Skye)
- Harlosh (Skye)
- Heaste (Skye)
- Howmore (South Uist)
- Hushinish (Harris)
- Inverarish (Raasay)
- Iochdar (South Uist)
- Isleornsay (Skye)
- Kensaleyre (Skye)
- Kilaulay (South Uist)
- Kilbride (Skye)
- Kilmaluag (Skye)
- Kilmarie (Skye)
- Kilmore (Skye)
- Kilmuir (Skye)
- Kilvaxter (Skye)
- Kingsburgh (Skye)
- Kyleakin (Skye)
- Kylerhea (Skye)
- Lealt (Skye)
- Leverburgh (Harris)
- Lochboisdale (South Uist)
- Lochmaddy (North Uist)
- Lower Breakish (Skye)
- Luib (Skye)
- Luskentyre (Harris)
- Milovaig (Skye)
- Mugeary (Skye)
- Newtonferry (North Uist)
- Northbay (Barra)
- Nunton (Benbecula)
- Ollach (Skye)
- Ose (Skye)
- Peinachorran (Skye)
- Portnalong (Skye)
- Portree (Skye)
- Ramasaig (Skye)
- Rèinigeadal (Harris)
- Roag (Skye)
- Rodel (Harris)
- Sconser (Skye)
- Skeabost (Skye)
- Sligachan (Skye)
- Staffin (Skye)
- Stoneybridge (South Uist)
- Stein (Skye)
- Sollas (North Uist)
- Struan (Skye)
- Suladale (Skye)
- Talisker (Skye)
- Tarbert (Harris)
- Tarskavaig (Skye)
- Teangue (Skye)
- Tigharry (North Uist)
- Torrin (Skye)
- Totaig (Skye)
- Tote (Skye)
- Treaslane (Skye)
- Trumpan (Skye)
- Uachdar (Benbecula)
- Uig (Duirinish, Skye)
- Uig (Snizort, Skye)
- Uigshader (Skye)
- Ullinish (Skye)
- Upper Breakish (Skye)
- Vatten (Skye)

== Parliamentary constituencies ==
There was an Inverness-shire constituency of the Parliament of Great Britain (Westminster) from 1708 to 1801 and of the Parliament of the United Kingdom (also at Westminster) from 1801 to 1918. The constituency represented, nominally, the county of Inverness minus the parliamentary burgh of Inverness, which was represented as a component of the Inverness District of Burghs constituency.

In 1918 the county constituency was divided between two new constituencies, the Inverness constituency and the Western Isles constituency. The Inverness constituency included the burgh of Inverness, other components of the district of burghs being divided between the Moray and Nairn constituency and the Ross and Cromarty constituency.

In 1983, eight years after the local government county of Inverness had been divided between the Highland region and the Western Isles council area, three new constituencies were created to cover the Highland region. The region, until 1996, and the unitary Highland council area, 1996 to present, have been covered by three constituencies since then but there were changes to boundaries and names in 1997 and 2005.

In 1999 the areas of the Westminster constituencies became also constituencies of the Scottish Parliament (Holyrood). The boundaries of Scottish Parliament constituencies have not altered since then. The Holyrood constituencies are within the Highlands and Islands electoral region.

Since 1983, Inverness has appeared in the names of Westminster and Holyrood constituencies as tabled below.

=== Westminster constituencies ===
Period	Constituency or constituencies
1983 to 1997	Inverness, Nairn and Lochaber
1997 to 2005	Ross, Skye and Inverness West
1997 to 2005	Inverness East, Nairn and Lochaber
2005 to 2024	Inverness, Nairn, Badenoch and Strathspey
2024 to present	Inverness, Skye and West Ross-shire

=== Holyrood constituencies ===
Period	Constituencies
1999 to present	Ross, Skye and Inverness West
1999 to present	Inverness East, Nairn and Lochaber
2011 to present	Inverness and Nairn
2011 to present	Skye, Lochaber and Badenoch

== See also ==
- Politics of the Highland council area
