= Ormacleit Castle =

Coordinates: 57°15′39.16″N 7°24′31.95″W

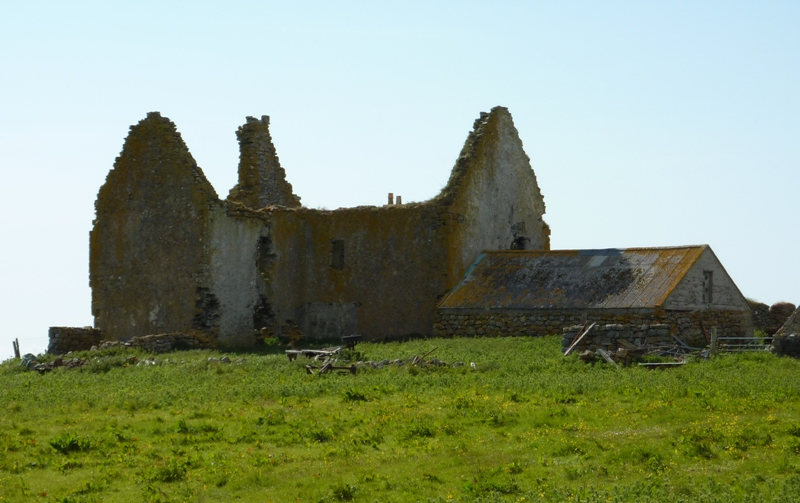
Ormacleit Castle.

Ormacleit Castle (Scottish Gaelic: Caisteal Ormacleit) is a ruined mansion house of the early 18th century. It is located on South Uist in the Western Isles of Scotland. It was built in the early years of the 18th century by Allan Macdonald, chief of Clanranald, and occupied from 1707. Macdonald was killed at the Battle of Sheriffmuir on 13 November 1715, and Ormacleit Castle is said to have burned down on the same day. After the fire, the Clanranald seat was moved north to Nunton on Benbecula, and the castle was abandoned after less than ten years of occupation.

The first structure at Ormacleit was begun in the late 16th century by Allan Macdonald, 9th chief of Clanranald. Parts of this building may be incorporated into the present house. The T-plan, two-storey house was formerly fronted by a forecourt to the north. Local tradition states that the castle was roofed with marble; pieces of green-coloured gneiss slabs found on the site may explain this belief. Above the main entrance is an armorial panel, although other decorative features have been removed.

The ruin is a Scheduled Monument.
