= Heaste =

Settlement on the island of Skye, Scotland

Coordinates: 57.18616°N 5.89709°W

Heaste: Scottish Gaelic: Heasta
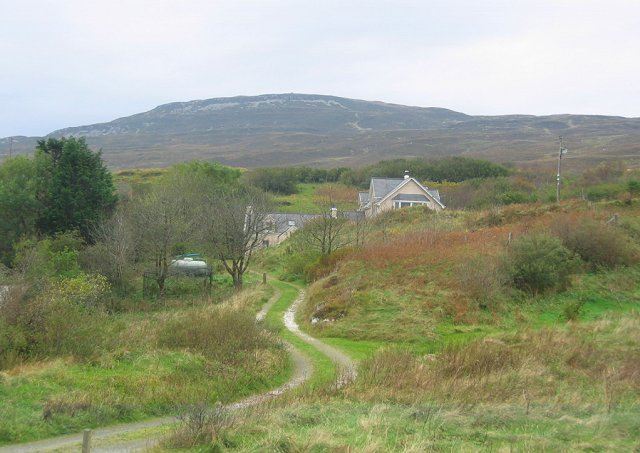

- Location within the Isle of Skye
- OS grid reference: NG646173
- Council area: Highland
- Country: Scotland
- Sovereign state: United Kingdom
- Post town: Broadford
- Postcode district: IV49 9
- Police: Scotland
- Fire: Scottish
- Ambulance: Scottish

Heasta, Heast, or the anglicised form Heaste, pron. /heɪst/, is a small settlement on the island of Skye, Scotland. It is located on the west coast of the island five miles (eight kilometres) south of Broadford extending down to the north shore of Loch Eiseort, facing out to the Atlantic to the south west and is in the Scottish council area of Highland.

== Etymology ==
The etymology of the name Heaste is unclear. It is likely that the name is old Norse as are a great many local placenames, not Scottish Gaelic. The anglicised "Heaste" spelling may have been influenced by the English word ‘haste’. Suggested etymologies have included: one been based on a suggestion relating to the tidal island of Eilean Heast which lies just off-shore in the sea-loch Loch Eiseort. This has been compared to Icelandic hestur (nom.sg.) hest (acc.sg.) ‘’horse’’ ( - perhaps an island where horses were confined.

Another suggestion is based on ON há- ‘high’ or else heiðr ‘heather’ + staðr ‘stead(ing)’ which therefore would equate to either ‘high stead(ing)’ or ‘heath stead(ing)’ and which describes well the location of the old village which also extended onto higher heather moorland, above the present day extent of the modern houses.

Many Norse-based placenames of the Hebrides, the Highlands, Orkney and Shetland terminate in the element "-sta" sometime clipped to -st (in either spelling only or in spelling and in pronunciation to some degree). Examples are Carbost in Skye (clipped in anglicised spelling) and Garrabost in Lewis, but many retain the final schwa and may or may not retain the unclipped -{sta} spelling. This suggests an analysis as two words is warranted in contrast to the first of the above suggested etymologies.

== Location ==
Heaste lies on the northern shore of the Atlantic sea-loch Loch Eiseort On the west coast of Skye. The tidal island of Eilean Heast which lies just off-shore in Loch Eiseort, Eilean Heast can be reached at low tide with great difficulty as the access is extremely muddy. The island shelters the Heaste shore from the worst of the waves from the southwest inti the sea loch.

To the west of Heasta Beinn nan Càrn dominates the view and blocks the view of the Skye Cuillin mountains. The nearest inhabited settlements as the crow flies are Druim Fheàrna to the east, which is at the head of Loch Eishort and An t-Òrd. On the other side, the south side of Loch Eishort. Neither is directly accessible by road and a very long journey is required back up to the main road near Broadford and then round to the east and south.

The northern, highest part of the township, at approximately 130 m altitude is one of the highest inhabited places in Skye and has views of the sea both to the east between Skye and the mainland and of the Atlantic to the west. To the east the Linne Shléibhteach and the mainland mountains of Knoydart including Beinn Sgritheall and Ladhar Bheinn can be seen. To the southwest, the Atlantic can be seen where the sea loch Loch Eishort opens out towards th Small Isles including the mountainous Island of Rùm. From just above the village, with difficulty the very top of the Sgurr of Eilean Eige can just be seen peeping above the hills of the Sléibhte peninsula of Skye.

== Employment economic activity and industry ==
Local industry includes:tourist accommodation; fishing out of Loch Eishort where there is a ‘pontoon’, a floating pier supported by buoyancy tanks; and crofting, keeping sheep and cattle. The Broadford Mackinnon Memorial Hospital and Sabhal Mór Ostaig are amongst the local providers of employment. There was a fish farm in Loch Eiseort which was worked from Heaste until the end of the 1990s when it was closed. This too provided local employment.

== Flora, fauna and animal husbandry ==
Above the village, deer, golden eagles and buzzards and other birds of prey are to be seen. Occasionally otters and mink have been seen right in the village itself. Every year, in late spring and early summer, several cuckoos can be heard calling back and forth at the north end of the village. Other wildlife includes: slow worms, adders, rabbits, foxes, dragonflies, woodcocks, wrens, voles, mice, rats toads and frogs.

In some parts of the village, orchids blanket the ground, with bluebells visible in late spring. There are also patches of marsh marigolds (or ‘king-cups’).

Cattle and sheep roam loose on the township common grazing. There is also a fank on the northern edge of Heasta too, just to the north of the northern edge of the village. There there is a cattle grid which marks the northern boundary of the village and which prevents livestock from entering the village down the road. There is also another cattle grid near the southern end of the Heasta road which similarly prevents entry by livestock. At the fank, sheep are sheared, livestock are rounded up and confined for medicinal treatment and in readiness for transport to market. Some residents keep hens or ducks, and one person has donkeys.

As well as working sheepdogs, the usual domestic pets are kept, including cats and pet dogs. As elsewhere, domestic cats threaten the bird life and eat rabbits and rodents; foxes and mink attack hens and ducks from time to time, and dogs are a concern regarding sheep.

== Surrounding environment ==
Within the village though there are trees in the deep clefts by the streams. There are many waterfalls. The road from Heaste to the north towards Broadford rises high over the hills reaching its highest point at the Fireach nan Clach. Here deer can sometimes be seen.

From the viewpoint of the Fireach nan Clach looking northward, the mountains of Blà-Bheinn and Beinn na Caillich dominate the view to the west. To the north can be seen Broadford Bay and the Inner Sound between Skye and the mainland; the islands of Scalpaigh and Pabaigh in Broadford Bay and to the north east there are the Applecross Mountains (over which runs the highest road in Britain) and the Skye Bridge. To the east, hills block the view of the narrow but extremely navigable channel that separates Skye from the mainland.

From Heaste itself the Skye Cuillin mountains cannot be seen because Beinn nan Càrn blocks the westward view. An ascent of Beinn nan Càrn provides spectacular 360-degree views of the mainland mountains, the Cuillin on Skye and the Atlantic sea surrounding the small isles Eilean Rùm and Eilean Eige.

The shoreline near Heaste collects a great deal of oceanic plastic waste, such as fishing nets. In 2023, a three-day cleanup project removed much but not all of the accumulated rubbish.

== Cleared and abandoned neighbouring settlements ==
Across Loch Eishort, to the south east on its southern (north-facing) shore the ruins of an abandoned village, Mòrsaig, can be seen with binoculars. Mòrsaig was abandoned because according to some local informants the environment was too harsh - ‘it was cold’; certainly it may get less sun than Heaste because it is slightly shadowed by hills to the south when the sun is low.

To the west a difficult path westwards up and down towards the shore leads to the abandoned village of Boraraig with all its stone houses still standing. There is also another abandoned village further still to the west along the coast, Sùisinis. The inhabitants of these settlements were forced out of their homes during the Highland Clearances at the end of the 19th century.

== Houses ==
Some inhabitants of these other neighbouring settlements moved to Heaste, thus swelling the population greatly by the early 20th century. Many houses in Heaste have been abandoned, some are those furthest away from the present day road on its west side; some ruins can be seen high up on the moor on the slope of Beinn nan Càrn.

In the 20th century many modern houses were built replacing the older stone ones, but at least one 19th century stone house remains; this was originally thatched and single-storey. The old village schoolhouse which was in use until the mid 20th century still stands, near the shore, in its own small stonewall enclosed garden. The schoolhouse is now used as holiday accommodation.

Heaste now contains only domestic residences and has no shops, offices, pub, post office or any such facilities, nor any current operating business premises as of 2019 aside from agricultural sheds.

== People ==
Many of the residents grew up in the village and some of the oldest attended the Heaste school before it closed. There are a number of incomers from outside the local area; from elsewhere in Scotland, many from England and elsewhere. Heaste is typical of the wider local area around Broadford where number of residents have come from other parts of Scotland, from England and outside the UK.

== Language ==
Typically for the area, English is the everyday language of the village for many, at least outside the home. A minority of the inhabitants of Heaste are native speakers of Scottish Gaelic but English is used even by the fluent Gaelic speakers frequently and almost always when outside the home. All Gaelic speakers are fluent in English. Some Gaelic speakers are very willing to speak the language even with learners they know. All Gaelic speakers speak the local dialect; currently there are no Gaelic speakers from other areas. The language can frequently be heard in certain situations in Broadford however, but not when strangers are present.
