= Gedintailor =

Coordinates: 57.33527°N 6.11775°W

Gedintailor: Scottish Gaelic: Gead an t-Sailleir
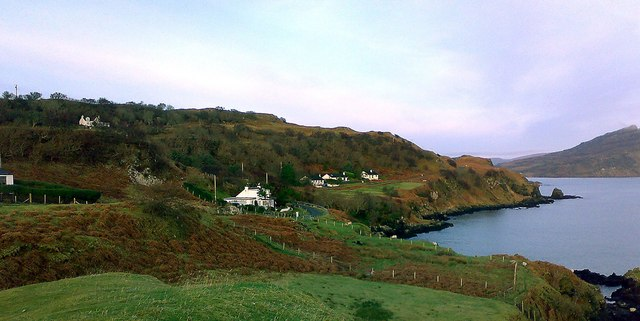
- The Braes, Gedintailor

- Location within the Isle of Skye
- OS grid reference: NG522346
- Council area: Highland
- Country: Scotland
- Sovereign state: United Kingdom
- Post town: Portree
- Postcode district: IV51 9
- Police: Scotland
- Fire: Scottish
- Ambulance: Scottish

Gedintailor (Scottish Gaelic: Gead an t-Sailleir) is a crofting village, lying on the shores of the Narrows of Raasay on the east coast of the island of Skye in Scotland and is in the council area of Highland.

The village lies on the B883 road, with the largest village of Camastianavaig 3 miles (5 kilometres) north, and the settlement of Peinachorran directly to the south.
