= Altrua =

Coordinates: 56.96726°N 4.89236°W

- Location within the Highland council area
- OS grid reference: NN242899
- Council area: Highland
- Country: Scotland
- Sovereign state: United Kingdom
- Postcode district: PH34 4
- Police: Scotland
- Fire: Scottish
- Ambulance: Scottish
- UK Parliament: Ross, Skye and Lochaber
- Scottish Parliament: Skye, Lochaber and Badenoch

Altrua is a small hamlet, on the south east shore of Loch Lochy, on the A82 road, close to Letterfinlay, Spean Bridge, in Inverness-shire, Scotland, within the Scottish council area of Highland.
