= Ollach =

Coordinates: 57.351004°N 6.132657°W

Ollach: Scottish Gaelic: An t-Olach
- Location within the Isle of Skye
- Population: 20
- OS grid reference: NG515365
- Council area: Highland
- Country: Scotland
- Sovereign state: United Kingdom
- Post town: Portree
- Postcode district: IV51 9LJ
- Police: Scotland
- Fire: Scottish
- Ambulance: Scottish

Ollach (in Scottish Gaelic, An t-Olach) is a remote settlement, made up of Lower Ollach and Upper Ollach, lying on B883 road, south of Portree, Isle of Skye in the Highlands of Scotland. It is in the council area of Highland.

Ollach is opposite Oskaig on the Isle of Raasay, and the nearest settlement of any size is Camastianavaig. The hamlet of Peinachorran and Balmeanach is directly to the south along the B883.

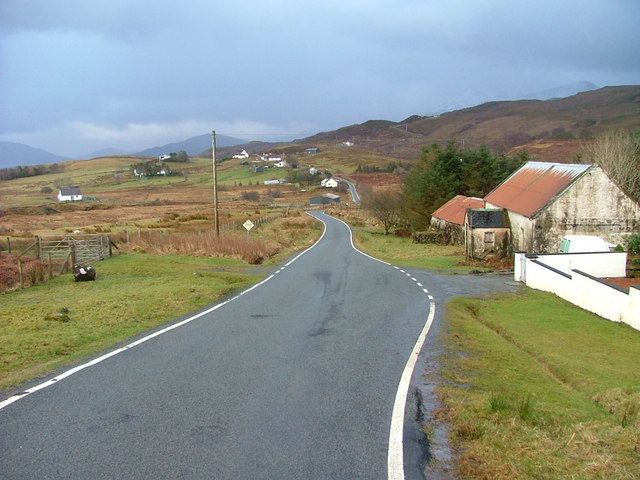
Ollach
