= Eynort =

Coordinates: 57.257°N 6.342°W

Eynort: Scottish Gaelic: Aoineart
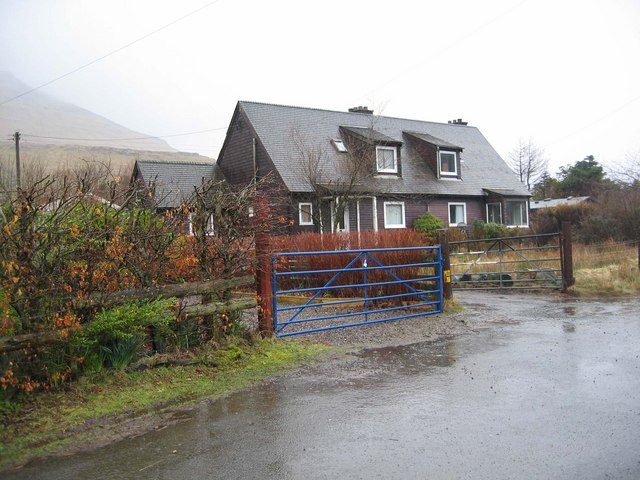
- Forestry housing in Eynort

- Location within the Isle of Skye
- OS grid reference: NG381268
- Council area: Highland
- Country: Scotland
- Sovereign state: United Kingdom
- Postcode district: IV47 8
- Police: Scotland
- Fire: Scottish
- Ambulance: Scottish

Eynort (Scottish Gaelic: Aoineart) is a small remote hamlet, situated at the head of Loch Eynort, on the west coast of the Isle of Skye, Scottish Highlands and is in the Scottish council area of Highland. The ruins of a chapel dedicated to St Maelrubha are located at Eynort.
