= Ardheisker =

Coordinates: 57.579°N 7.416°W

Ardheisker: Scottish Gaelic: Àird Heillsgeir
- Ardheisker from the A865 causeway

- Location within the Outer Hebrides
- Language: Scottish Gaelic; English
- OS grid reference: NF763672
- Civil parish: North Uist
- Council area: Na h-Eileanan Siar
- Lieutenancy area: Western Isles
- Country: Scotland
- Sovereign state: United Kingdom
- Post town: ISLE OF NORTH UIST
- Postcode district: HS6
- Dialling code: 01876
- Police: Scotland
- Fire: Scottish
- Ambulance: Scottish
- UK Parliament: Na h-Eileanan an Iar
- Scottish Parliament: Na h-Eileanan an Iar

Ardheisker (Scottish Gaelic: Àird Heillsgeir) is a settlement on North Uist, in the Outer Hebrides, Scotland. Ardheisker is within the parish of North Uist, and the A865 runs through the settlement.
