= Loch na Dal =

Sea loch on the Sleat Peninsula on the Isle of Skye in Scotland

Coordinates: 57.168°N 5.794°W

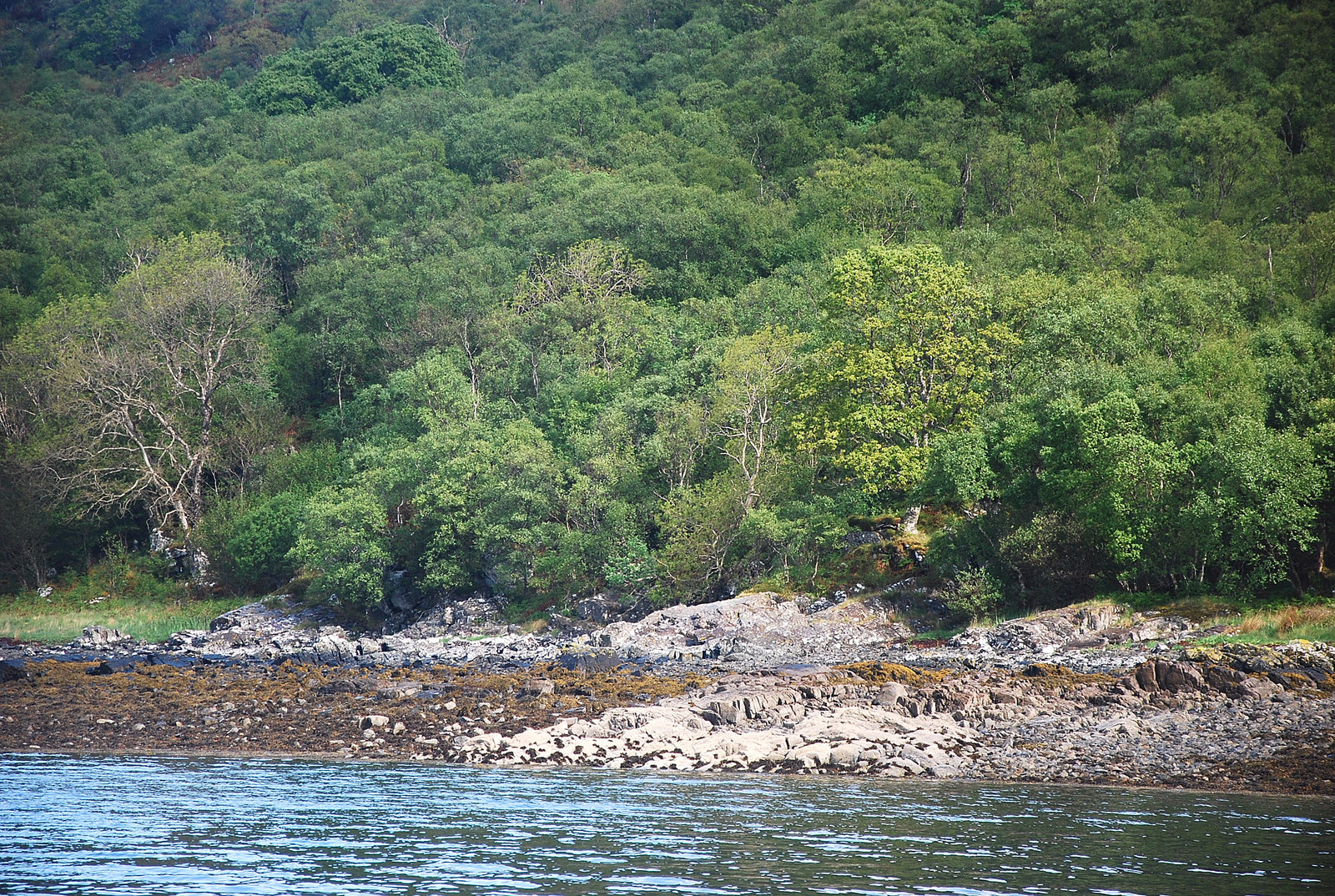
Loch na Dal Shoreline

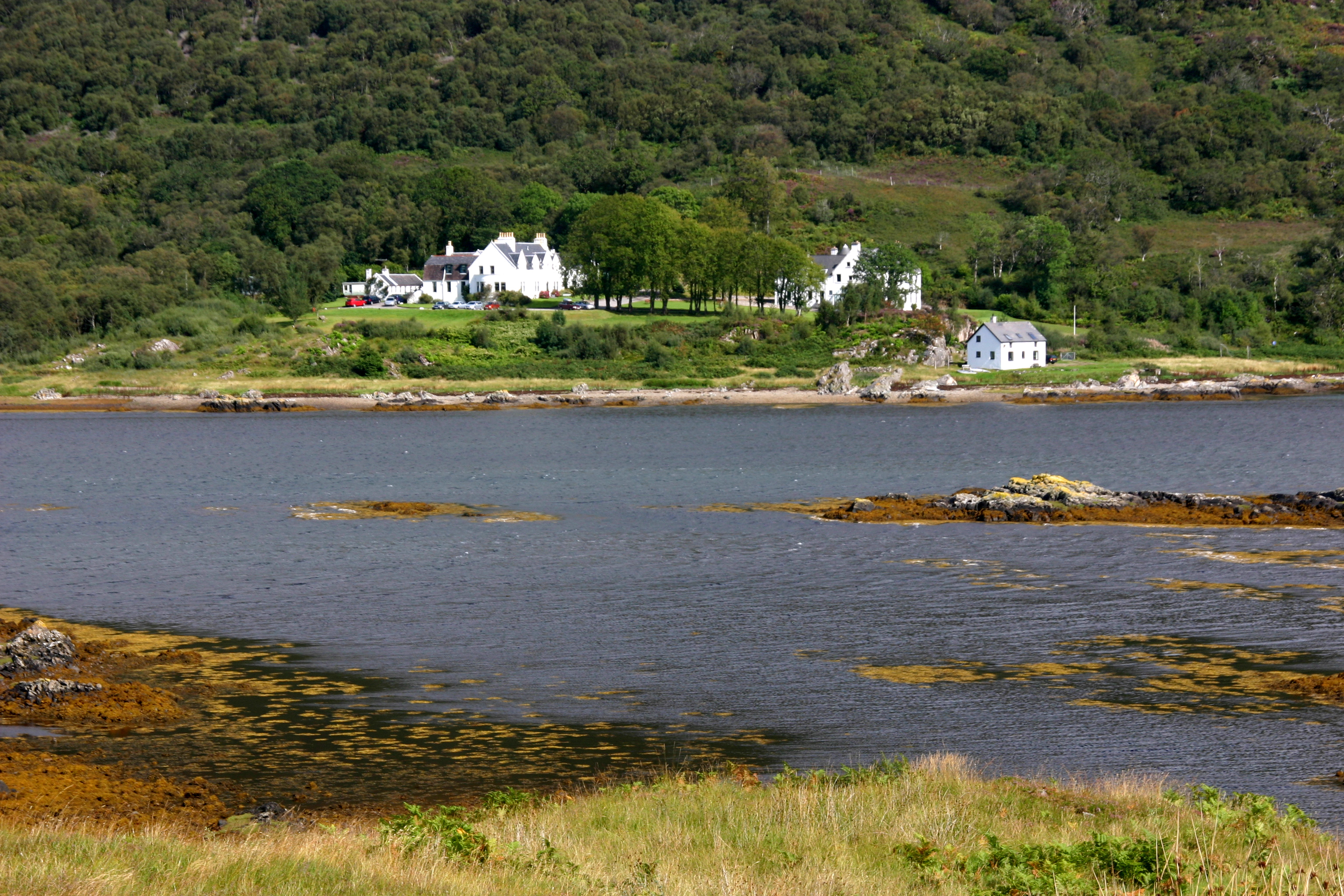
Isle of Skye in Scotland across Loch na Dal

Loch na Dal (Scottish Gaelic: Loch na Dalach) is a sea loch on the Sleat Peninsula on the Isle of Skye in the Inner Hebrides of Scotland. Kinloch Lodge, a hotel, is located on its northern shore and the A851 road runs along its southern shore. Although the meaning of the name is obscure in the current spelling, in the Blaeu Atlas of Scotland, 1654, the loch is listed as "Loch na Dallach". This could be "The Loch of the Delay" or "The Loch of the Meeting" (Loch na Dàlach) or "The Loch of the Meadow" (Loch na Dalach). The later reading is possibly more likely, as a long river delta borders Abhainn Ceann-Locha (The River at the Head of the Loch) as it enters the north end of Loch na Dal, and this piece of land is green and flat enough that it was at one time used as a football pitch.

A partly-preserved neolithic burial cairn, An Càrn Glas [the grey cairn], is located at the head of the loch on the east bank of Abhainn Ceann-Locha.
