= Drumfearn =

Coordinates: 57.17329°N 5.85202°W

Drumfearn: Scottish Gaelic: An Druim Fheàrna
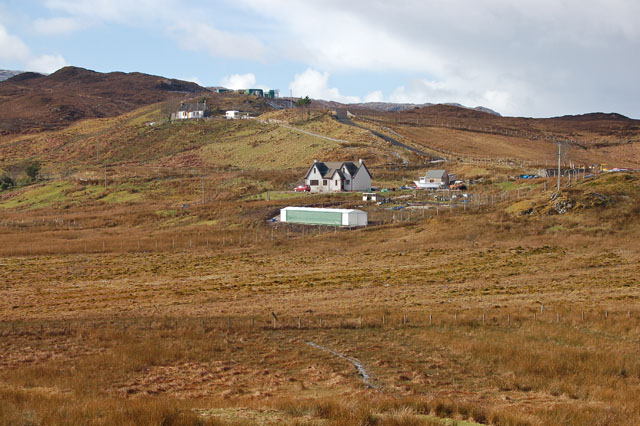
- Part of the scattered community

- Location within the Isle of Skye
- OS grid reference: NG672157
- Council area: Highland
- Country: Scotland
- Sovereign state: United Kingdom
- Post town: Isle Ornsay
- Postcode district: IV43 8
- Police: Scotland
- Fire: Scottish
- Ambulance: Scottish

Drumfearn (Scottish Gaelic: An Druim Fheàrna) is a small crofting township, lying at the head of the Sleat peninsula, at the head of Loch Eishort, on the isle of Skye in the Highlands of Scotland and is in the Scottish council area of Highland.

There are ten crofts in the township, some of which were occupied by people cleared from other parts of Skye: in the 1820s from the village of Kilbride, and in 1852 from the villages of Boraraig and Suishnish.

The village is accessed from a B road, leading from the main A851 road.

== Gaelic in Drumfearn ==
After English, Scottish Gaelic is the most commonly spoken language in the village. Drumfearn is included in a census output area with Duisdale, Kinloch and Kylerhea, and in 2011, 32.4% of this area were recorded as Gaelic speakers. Historically, Gaelic was the principal language in the village. In 1901, 92.0% of the population of Drumfearn and Kinloch were recorded as Gaelic speakers, and 24.3% were recorded as being monolingual in the Gaelic language.

All of the principal place-names in the village derive from Gaelic. The name of the village itself means the Ridge of Alders. Most of the homes in the village are arrayed along the southern slopes of a small hill, Mullach an Achaidh Mhòir (The Summit of the Great Field). Lòn Creadha (The Clay Stream) flows through the village from Loch an Iasgaich (The Fishing Lake) to the south, past Mullach an Achaidh Mhòir and west towards Loch na Dal (originally Loch na Dalach; Sea Loch of the Field). The upper reaches of this stream are also called Allt an t-Slugain (The Stream of the Ravine).

== Prehistoric sites ==
A short standing stone has been identified on boggy ground to the south-west of the village. Remains of a large neolithic chambered cairn can be seen on the south bank of Abhainn Ceann Loch Eiseort just before the stream enters the loch.

== Notable residents ==
The Gaelic scholar and musician, Malcolm 'Calum Mòr' MacInnes, was born on 8 February 1871, at 2 Drumfearn. Having published a number of works on Gaelic music, MacInnes is best known for his influential collection of Highland bagpipe music, 120 Bagpipe Tunes, Gleanings & Styles, published in 1939.
