= Bualintur =

Coordinates: 57.20558°N 6.29502°W

Bualintur: Scottish Gaelic: Buaile an Todhair
- Location within the Isle of Skye
- OS grid reference: NG407209
- Council area: Highland
- Country: Scotland
- Sovereign state: United Kingdom
- Postcode district: IV47 8
- Police: Scotland
- Fire: Scottish
- Ambulance: Scottish

Bualintur (Scottish Gaelic: Buaile an Todhair) is a remote township, which lies at the head of Loch Brittle on the island of Skye in the Highlands of Scotland and is in the Scottish council area of Highland. Accessed only by the Glen Brittle bridge (footbridge) that appears in the Royal Commission on Ancient and Historical Monuments in Scotland Bualintur affords some of the best views of the Cuillin hills, and is the point of access for several of Skye' s most dramatic coastal and forest walks. In recent history it was the central township of Glen Brittle, with the post office and school for the community. It was once a thriving community before the effects of the highland clearances and depopulation of the highlands and islands took place, and many ruined houses can be seen among the existing houses.

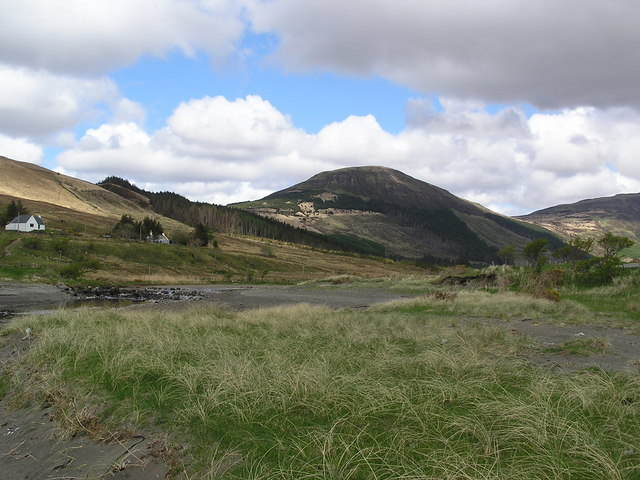
Bualintur at the head of Loch Brittle
