= Ballifeary =

District of Inverness, Scotland

Coordinates: 57.4672°N 4.2380°W

Ballifeary: Scottish Gaelic: Baile na Faire
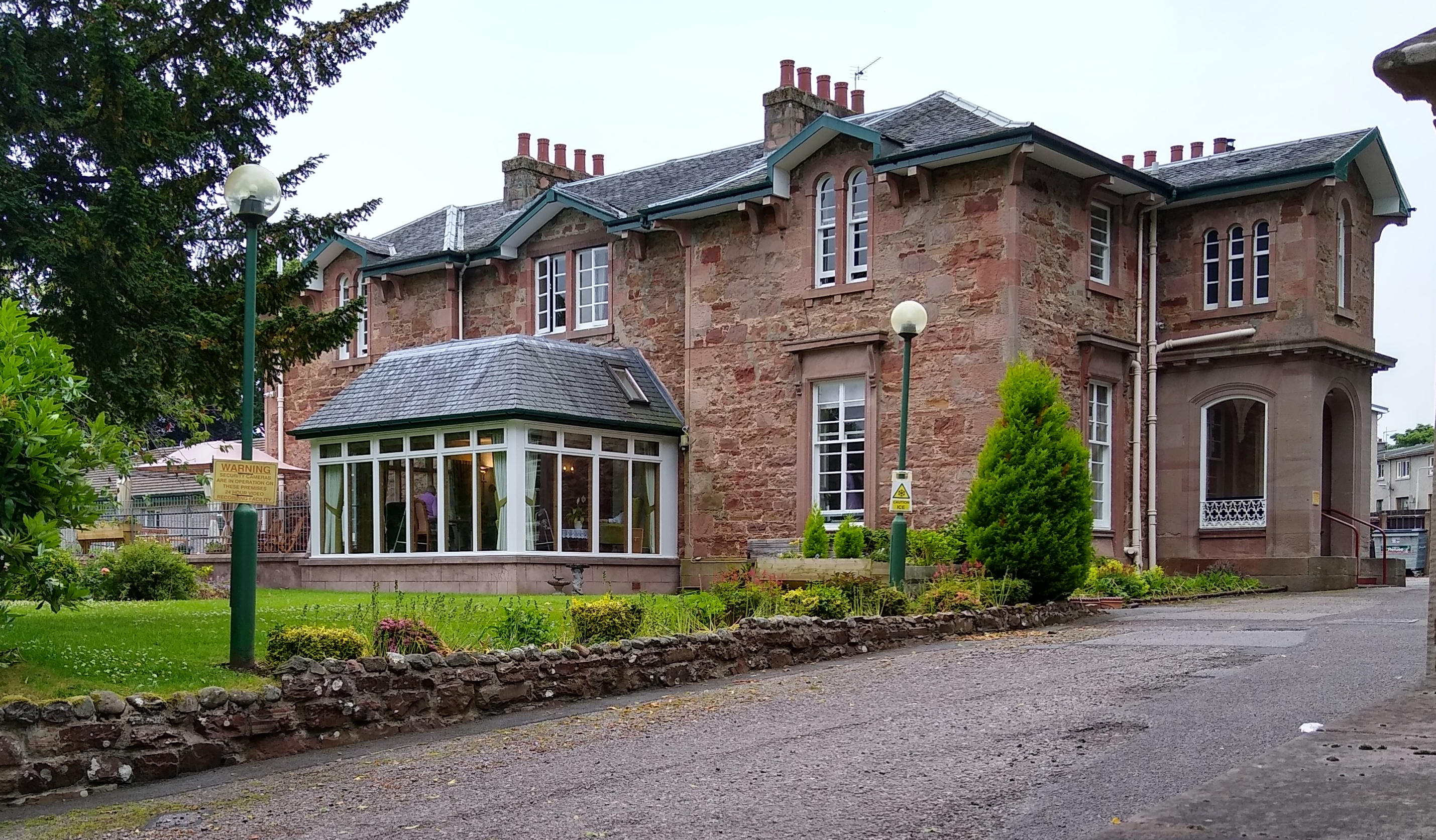
- Ballifeary House

- Location within the Highland council area
- OS grid reference: NH 65862 44096
- Council area: Highland
- Country: Scotland
- Sovereign state: United Kingdom
- Post town: Inverness
- Postcode district: IV3 5
- Dialling code: 01463 231
- Police: Scotland
- Fire: Scottish
- Ambulance: Scottish

Ballifeary (/ˌbælɪˈfɛəri/; Scottish Gaelic: Baile na Faire) is district of Inverness, Scotland. It is situated a half-mile (1 km) south southwest of the town centre. The B-listed Ballifeary House on Ness Walk dates from the mid-19th century, but has been a care home run by the Free Presbyterian Church of Scotland since 1964. Bught Park lies immediately to the south.

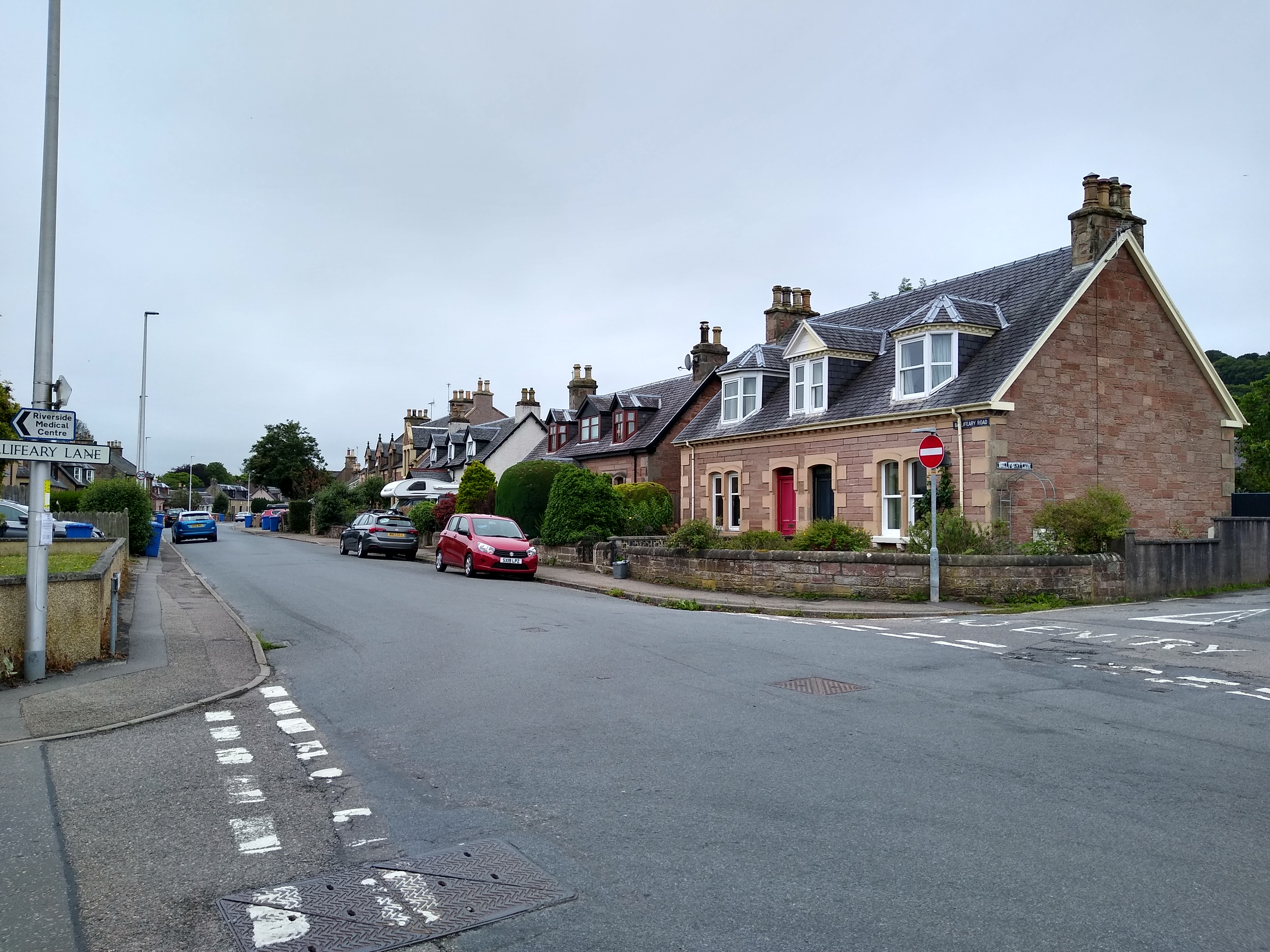
Ballifeary Lane and Ballifeary Road
