= Ramasaig =

Coordinates: 57.39723°N 6.72226°W

- Location within the Isle of Skye
- OS grid reference: NG164439
- Council area: Highland
- Country: Scotland
- Sovereign state: United Kingdom
- Post town: Dunvegan
- Postcode district: IV55 8
- Police: Scotland
- Fire: Scottish
- Ambulance: Scottish

Ramasaig is a small township on the western shore of the Duirinish peninsula, on Dunvegan, Isle of Skye and is in the Scottish Highlands and is in the Scottish council area of Highland. Ramasaig lies close to the Ramasaig Cliffs, at the southern end of the shallow bowl shaped bay made up of Ramasaig Bay at the southern end and Moonen Bay at the north.
