= Baile Glas =

Coordinates: 57.499°N 7.265°W

Baile Glas: Scottish Gaelic: Am Baile Glas
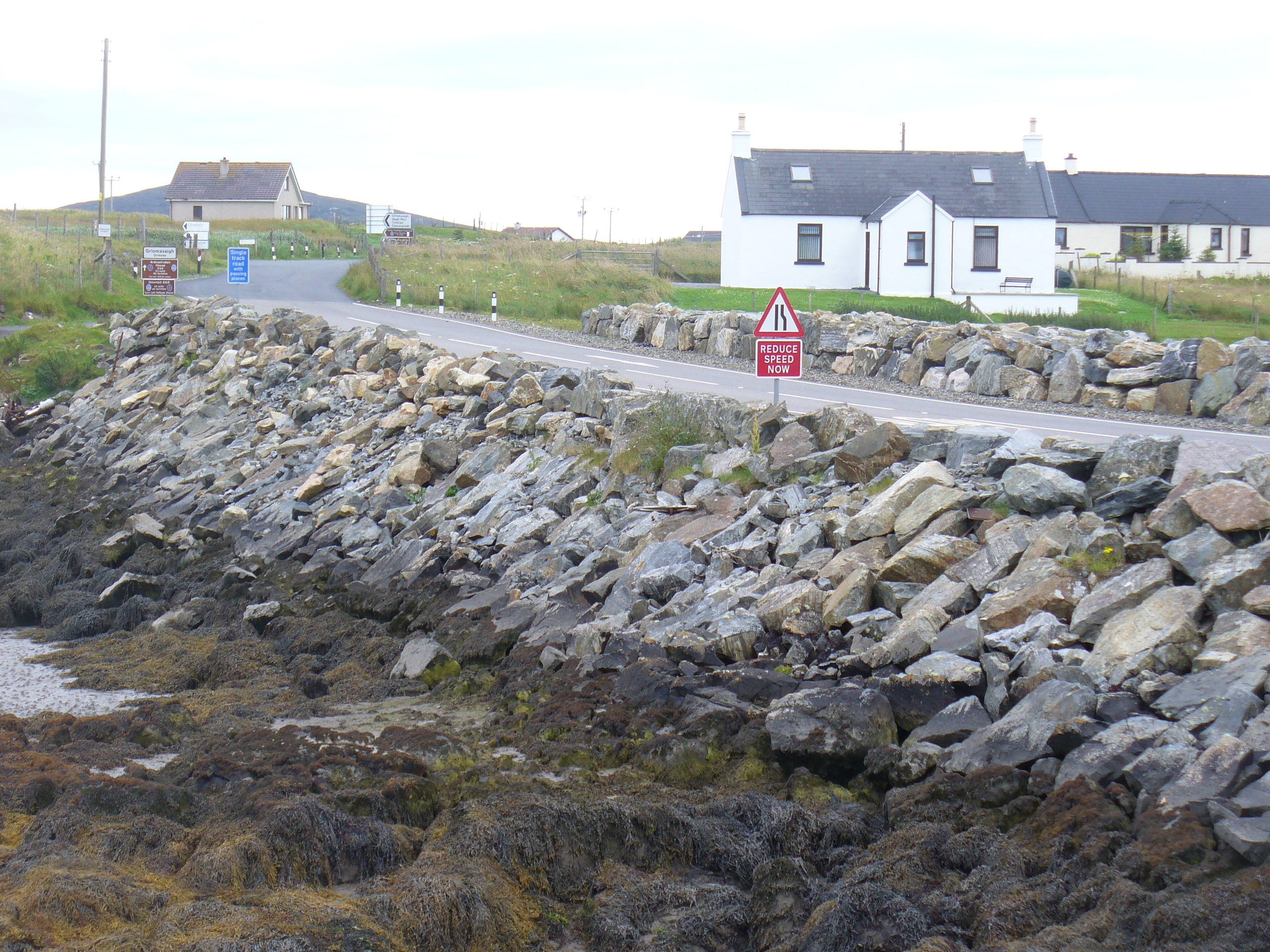
- Baile Glas, Grimsay

- Location within the Outer Hebrides
- Language: Scottish Gaelic; English
- OS grid reference: NF846576
- Civil parish: North Uist
- Council area: Na h-Eileanan Siar
- Lieutenancy area: Western Isles
- Country: Scotland
- Sovereign state: United Kingdom
- Post town: ISLE OF NORTH UIST
- Postcode district: HS6
- Dialling code: 01870
- Police: Scotland
- Fire: Scottish
- Ambulance: Scottish
- UK Parliament: Na h-Eileanan an Iar
- Scottish Parliament: Na h-Eileanan an Iar

Baile Glas or Ballaglasa (Scottish Gaelic: Am Baile Glas) is a settlement on Grimsay in the Outer Hebrides, Scotland. Ballaglasa is within the parish of North Uist.
