= Ardveenish =

Coordinates: 57.005°N 7.419°W

Ardveenish: Scottish Gaelic: Àird Mhèanais
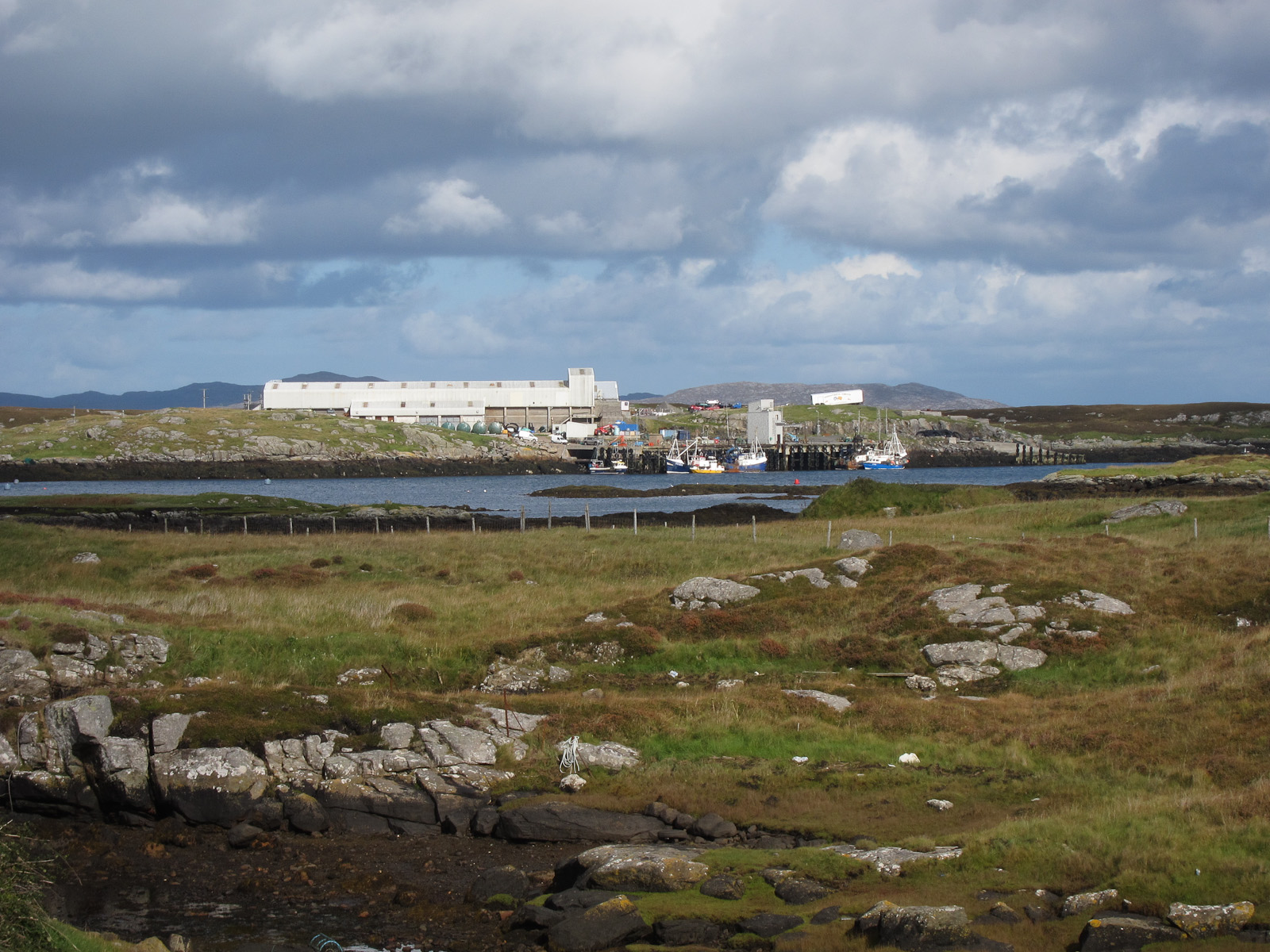
- The Barratlantic fish factory at Ardveenish

- Location within the Outer Hebrides
- Language: Scottish Gaelic; English
- OS grid reference: NF710034
- Civil parish: Barra
- Council area: Na h-Eileanan Siar
- Lieutenancy area: Western Isles
- Country: Scotland
- Sovereign state: United Kingdom
- Post town: ISLE OF BARRA
- Postcode district: HS9
- Dialling code: 01871
- Police: Scotland
- Fire: Scottish
- Ambulance: Scottish
- UK Parliament: Na h-Eileanan an Iar
- Scottish Parliament: Na h-Eileanan an Iar

Ardveenish (Scottish Gaelic: Àird Mhèanais) is a village on Barra in the Western Isles, Scotland. Ardveenish is also within the parish of Barra.
