= Bogach =

Coordinates: 56.995°N 7.414°W

Bogach: Scottish Gaelic: A' Bhogach
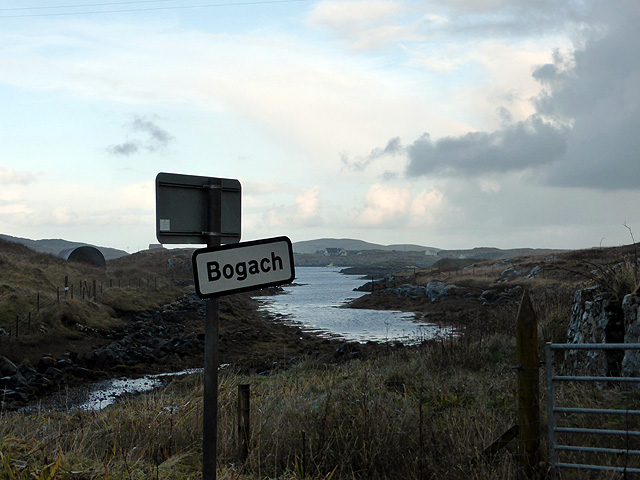
- Sea inlet at Bogach

- Location within the Outer Hebrides
- Language: Scottish Gaelic; English
- OS grid reference: NF712023
- Civil parish: Barra
- Council area: Na h-Eileanan Siar
- Lieutenancy area: Western Isles
- Country: Scotland
- Sovereign state: United Kingdom
- Post town: ISLE OF BARRA
- Postcode district: HS9
- Dialling code: 01871
- Police: Scotland
- Fire: Scottish
- Ambulance: Scottish
- UK Parliament: Na h-Eileanan an Iar
- Scottish Parliament: Na h-Eileanan an Iar

Bogach (Scottish Gaelic: A' Bhogach) is a village on the island of Barra in the Outer Hebrides, Scotland. Bogach is also within the parish of Barra, and is situated on a minor road, linked to the A888. It comprises just 8 crofts, each situated on a narrow strip of land stretching from the north coast to the south. It separates the main island at Bagherivagh from the peninsula known as Bruairnis.
