= Balgarva =

Coordinates: 57.397°N 7.386°W

Balgarva: Scottish Gaelic: Baile Gharbhaidh
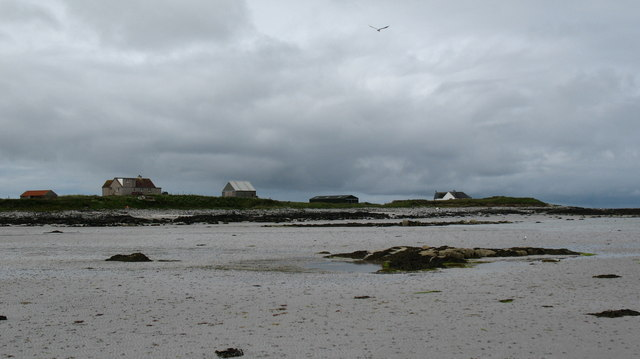
- Houses along the shore, at Balgarva

- Location within the Outer Hebrides
- Language: Scottish Gaelic; English
- OS grid reference: NF765468
- Civil parish: South Uist
- Council area: Na h-Eileanan Siar
- Lieutenancy area: Western Isles
- Country: Scotland
- Sovereign state: United Kingdom
- Post town: ISLE OF SOUTH UIST
- Postcode district: HS8
- Dialling code: 01878
- Police: Scotland
- Fire: Scottish
- Ambulance: Scottish
- UK Parliament: Na h-Eileanan an Iar
- Scottish Parliament: Na h-Eileanan an Iar

Balgarva (Scottish Gaelic: Baile Gharbhaidh) is a crofting settlement on South Uist in the Outer Hebrides, Scotland. Balgarva is within the parish of South Uist.
