= Auratote =

Coordinates: 57.163°N 7.316°W

Auratote: Scottish Gaelic: Oratobht
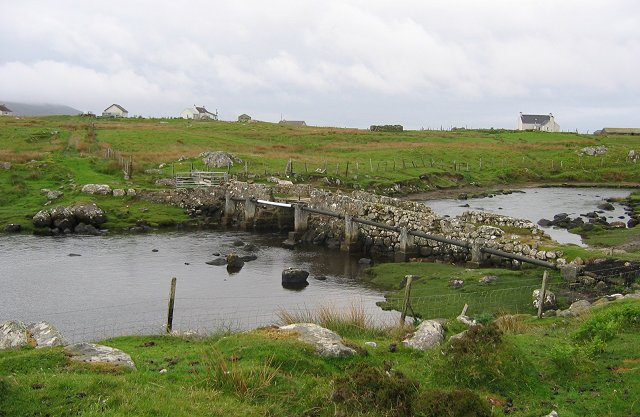
- Oratobht Bridge at the end of the tidal part of Loch Boisdale

- Location within the Outer Hebrides
- Language: Scottish Gaelic; English
- OS grid reference: NF786205
- Civil parish: South Uist
- Council area: Na h-Eileanan Siar
- Lieutenancy area: Western Isles
- Country: Scotland
- Sovereign state: United Kingdom
- Post town: ISLE OF SOUTH UIST
- Postcode district: HS8
- Dialling code: 01878
- Police: Scotland
- Fire: Scottish
- Ambulance: Scottish
- UK Parliament: Na h-Eileanan an Iar
- Scottish Parliament: Na h-Eileanan an Iar

Auratote (Scottish Gaelic: Oratobht) is a location on South Uist in the Outer Hebrides, Scotland. Auratote is within the parish of South Uist.
