= Bail' Iochdrach =

Coordinates: 57.514°N 7.318°W

Baliochrach: Scottish Gaelic: Am Baile Ìochdrach
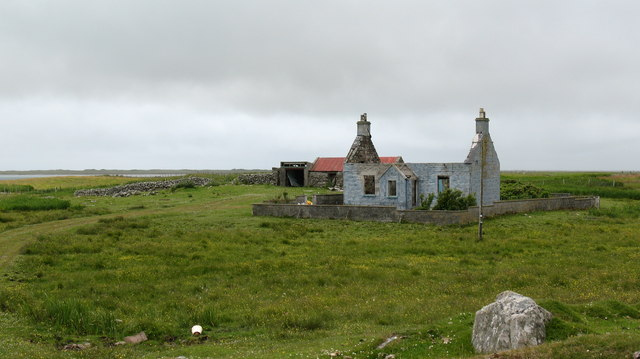
- Ruin at Baliochrach

- Location within the Outer Hebrides
- Language: Scottish Gaelic; English
- OS grid reference: NF816595
- Civil parish: North Uist
- Council area: Na h-Eileanan Siar
- Lieutenancy area: Western Isles
- Country: Scotland
- Sovereign state: United Kingdom
- Post town: ISLE OF BENBECULA
- Postcode district: HS7
- Dialling code: 01876
- Police: Scotland
- Fire: Scottish
- Ambulance: Scottish
- UK Parliament: Na h-Eileanan an Iar
- Scottish Parliament: Na h-Eileanan an Iar

Bail' Iochdrach or Baliochrach (Scottish Gaelic: Am Baile Ìochdrach) is a village on Benbecula in the Outer Hebrides, Scotland. Baliochrach is within the parish of North Uist.
