= Fasach =

Coordinates: 57.4501°N 6.68447°W

Fasach: Scottish Gaelic: Fàsach
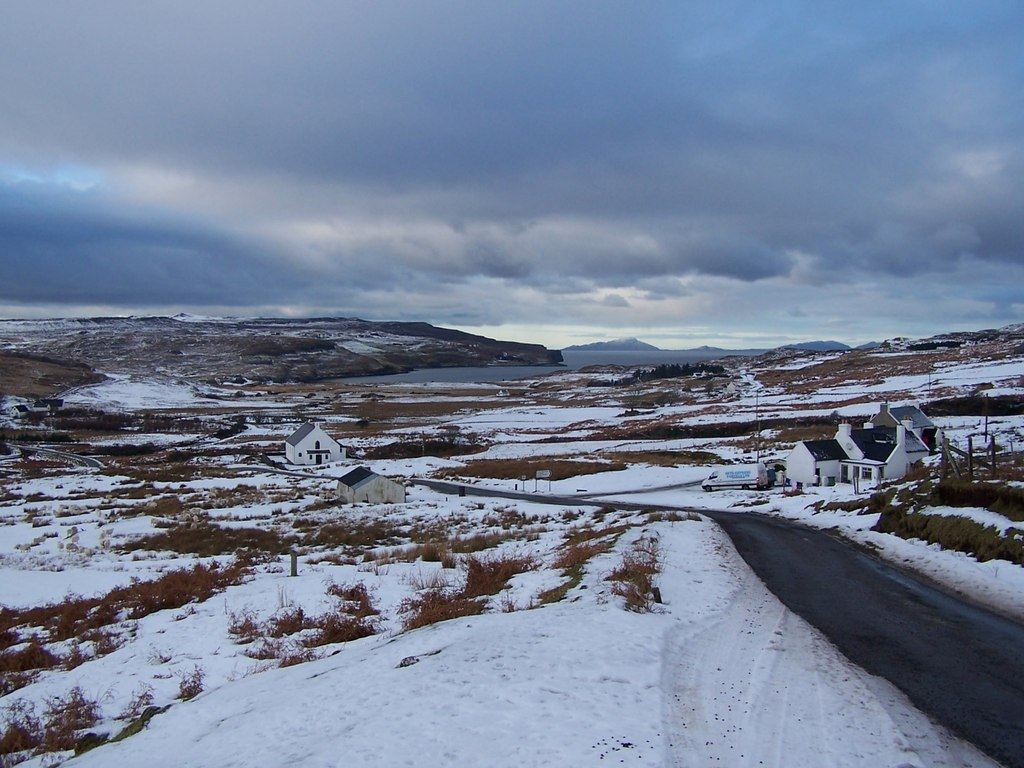
- A single track road with at least two steep hills connects Fasach and Glendale to the rest of Skye.

- Location within the Isle of Skye
- OS grid reference: NG190496
- Council area: Highland
- Country: Scotland
- Sovereign state: United Kingdom
- Post town: Glendale
- Postcode district: IV55 8
- Police: Scotland
- Fire: Scottish
- Ambulance: Scottish

Fasach (Scottish Gaelic: Fàsach) is a crofting settlement in Glendale on the Duirinish peninsula of the Isle of Skye, Scottish Highlands and is in the Scottish council area of Highland.
