= Borsham =

Coordinates: 57.768°N 6.912°W

Borsham: Scottish Gaelic: Boirseam
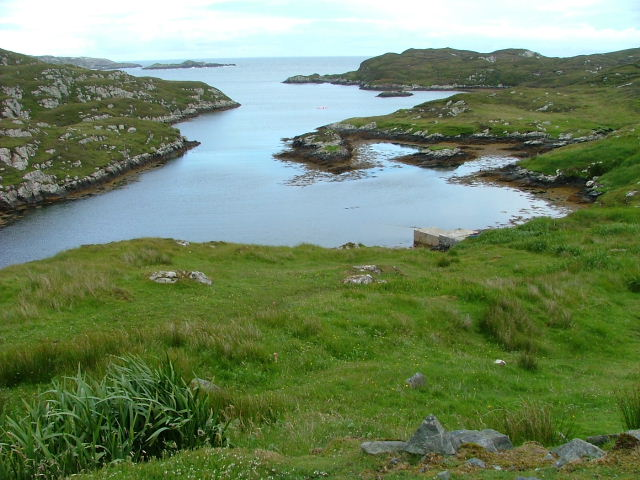
- Inlet on Loch Fionnsabagh at Borsham

- Location within the Outer Hebrides
- Language: Scottish Gaelic; English
- OS grid reference: NG079859
- Civil parish: Harris
- Council area: Na h-Eileanan Siar
- Lieutenancy area: Western Isles
- Country: Scotland
- Sovereign state: United Kingdom
- Post town: ISLE OF HARRIS
- Postcode district: HS3
- Dialling code: 01859
- Police: Scotland
- Fire: Scottish
- Ambulance: Scottish
- UK Parliament: Na h-Eileanan an Iar
- Scottish Parliament: Na h-Eileanan an Iar

Borsham (Scottish Gaelic: Boirseam) is a village in the 'Bays' area of Harris in the Outer Hebrides, Scotland. Borsham is within the parish of Harris. The settlement is situated off the C79, incorrectly known as 'The Golden Road’ which actually runs from Stockinish to Miavaig

Borsham is the birthplace of Scottish Gaelic broadcaster and author, John D Urquhart (Scottish Gaelic: Iain Urchardan).
