= Nunton, Benbecula =

Coordinates: 57.459°N 7.395°W

Nunton: Scottish Gaelic: Baile nan Cailleach
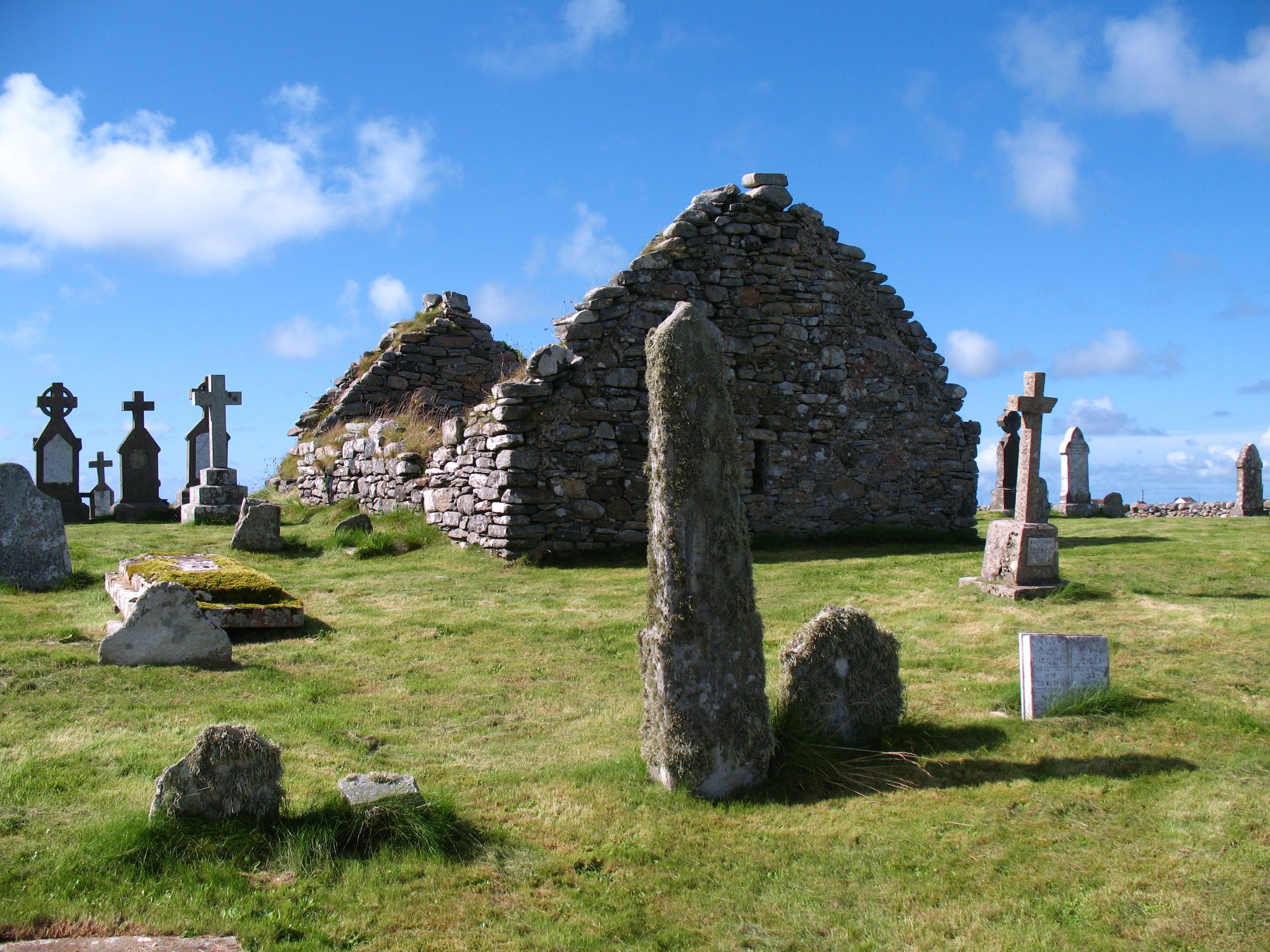
- Nunton Chapel

- Location within the Outer Hebrides
- Language: Scottish Gaelic; English
- OS grid reference: NF765537
- Civil parish: South Uist
- Council area: Na h-Eileanan Siar
- Lieutenancy area: Western Isles
- Country: Scotland
- Sovereign state: United Kingdom
- Post town: ISLE OF BENBECULA
- Postcode district: HS7
- Dialling code: 01870
- Police: Scotland
- Fire: Scottish
- Ambulance: Scottish
- UK Parliament: Na h-Eileanan an Iar
- Scottish Parliament: Na h-Eileanan an Iar

Nunton (Scottish Gaelic: Baile nan Cailleach) is a settlement on Benbecula in the Outer Hebrides, Scotland. Nunton is within the parish of South Uist, and is situated on the B892.
