= Boreraig =

Coordinates: 57.177°N 5.941°W

Boreraig: Scottish Gaelic: Boraraig
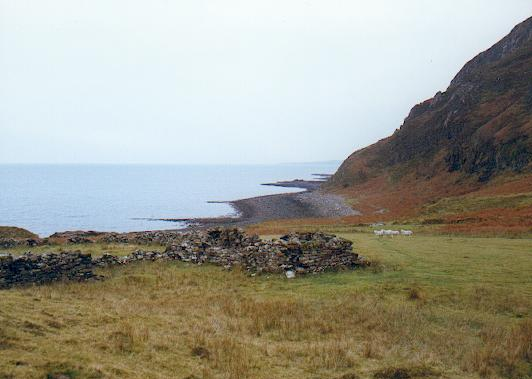
- A ruined croft at Boreraig

- Location within the Isle of Skye
- OS grid reference: NG6116
- Council area: Highland
- Lieutenancy area: Ross and Cromarty
- Country: Scotland
- Sovereign state: United Kingdom
- Post town: ISLE OF SKYE
- Police: Scotland
- Fire: Scottish
- Ambulance: Scottish
- UK Parliament: Inverness, Skye and West Ross-shire
- Scottish Parliament: Ross, Skye and Inverness West

Boreraig (Scottish Gaelic: Boraraig) is a deserted township in Strath Swordale (Srath Shuardail) on the north shore of Loch Eishort (Loch Eiseort) in the parish of Strath, Isle of Skye, Scotland.

== History ==
=== Early history ===
Boreraig, lying in a green and fertile glen, sheltered and south-facing, is an of a traditional, pre-crofting baile or township. It was forcibly cleared by the agents of Lord MacDonald to make way for sheep in 1853.

Many of the inhabitants, mainly crofters, emigrated after they were evicted. The Scottish census reveals that, by 1851, in the parish of Strath, Shire of Inverness, approximately one hundred and twenty men, women and children lived in Boreraig's 22 households. Not every adult's occupation was recorded, but where the census taker kept a record, he described most individuals as crofters, agricultural labourers, or farm servants. Among them he also recorded a few weavers, a fisherman, and a house carpenter.

Croft tenancy records dating back to 1823, now held by the Clan Donald Centre at the Armadale Museum of the Isles in Sleat on the Isle of Skye, indicate that the twenty two households were spread across ten landholdings, each of 6 acres (2.4 hectares). Many of the inhabitants were related. Anglicised death records indicate a good number of the inhabitants had maternal or paternal forebears born with the surname MacInnes.

The Boreraig evictions coincided with the high water mark of the Highland and Island Emigration Society. During the few years of operation, the scheme resettled some 5000 highlanders and islanders in Australia. By 1853, the HIES had accepted at least eight of Boreraig's 22 households, or just under half the occupants of the cleared village, for sponsored resettlement.

In 1852 families from three Boreraig households sailed on the Araminta, the Allison, and the Ontario. Late in the same year, five more Boreraig households set out to emigrate with the HIES. The berths allocated to them were on HMS Hercules. Fever broke out on board. Passengers were dying before the ship reached Ireland.

If other Boreraig families had been accepted for HIES resettlement, they decided not to take up the HIES option.

Clan Donald records indicate approximately seven of the household listed as 1852 Boreraig tenants (whether solely or jointly) eventually ended up as tenants of crofts in other villages. Scottish General Registry Office records confirm this.

=== Modern era ===
All that is left in Boreraig now is the ruined housing, much of it still standing to wallhead height, and the well-preserved field walls. The biggest ruins are those of the house and steading built for the tenant-farmer. The village lost its last residents in 1877. Scottish Gaelic was the language of the inhabitants.

The sheep farmhouse was abandoned in 1910. However the land is still used for grazing a flock of approximately 300 breeding ewes of the North Country Cheviot breed, which are hefted onto the area and run from Kilbride. Boreraig cannot be reached by any vehicular transport at all, thus making winter feed supplementation impossible, but the township has some of the most fertile grassland in Strath Swordale so the sheep remain in reasonable condition.

There is a standing stone and a remarkable footbridge over a stream consisting of a single slab of stone, which is said to have been lifted into place by one man - "Glagan-glùine" or "Knock-knees", who was alive in the early 18th century. The remains of a promontory dun and an anchorage can be seen.

There is a very popular circular walk of about 8–9 miles (13–14.5 kilometres), starting and finishing at Kilchrist (Cill Chrìosda or Cill a' Chrò), taking in Boreraig, neighbouring Suisnish (Suidhisnis) and Kilbride (Cille Bhrìghde).

The land today, like much of Strath Swordale, is owned by the Scottish Government.

== Gallery ==
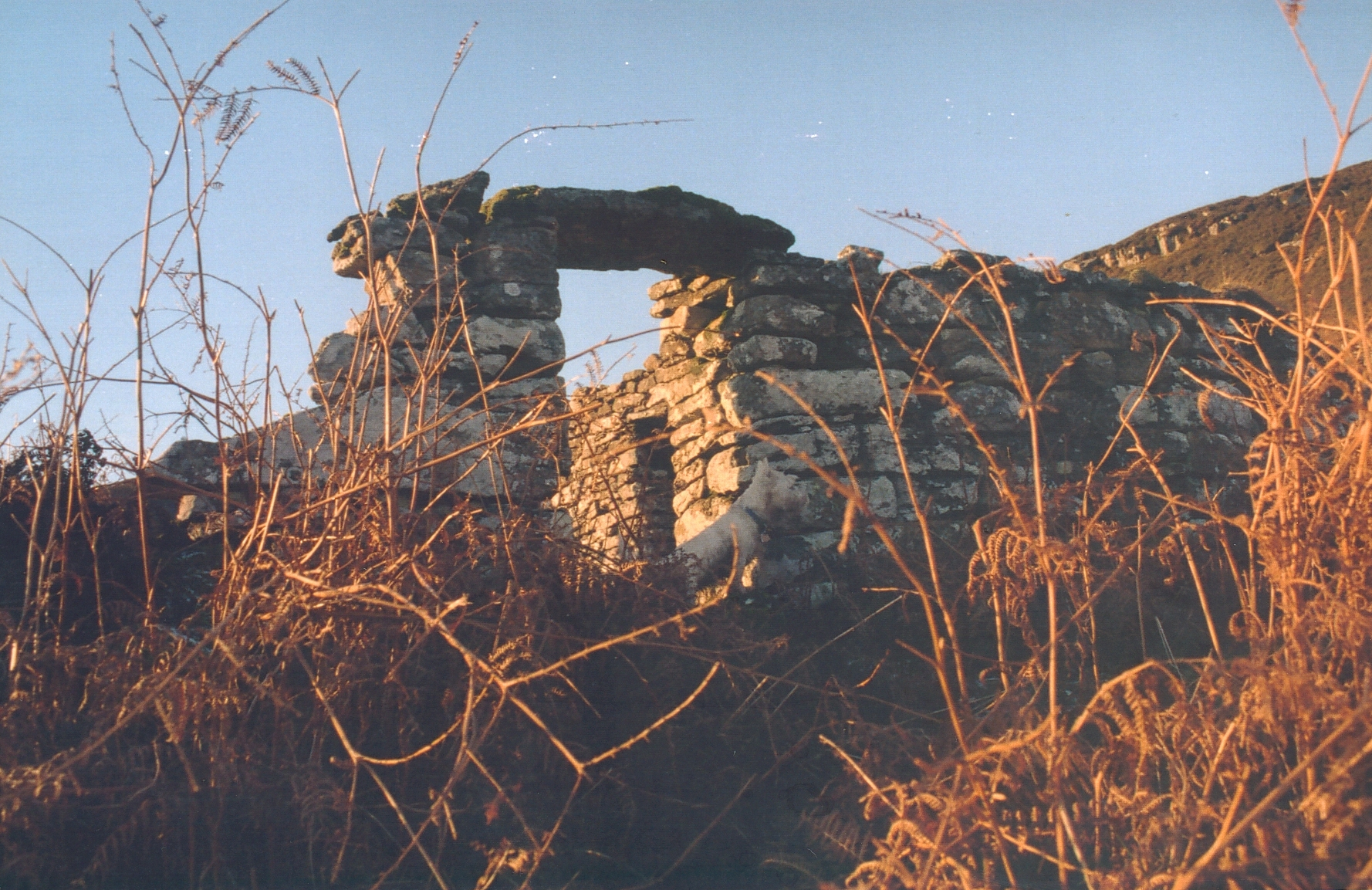
House ruin, Boreraig

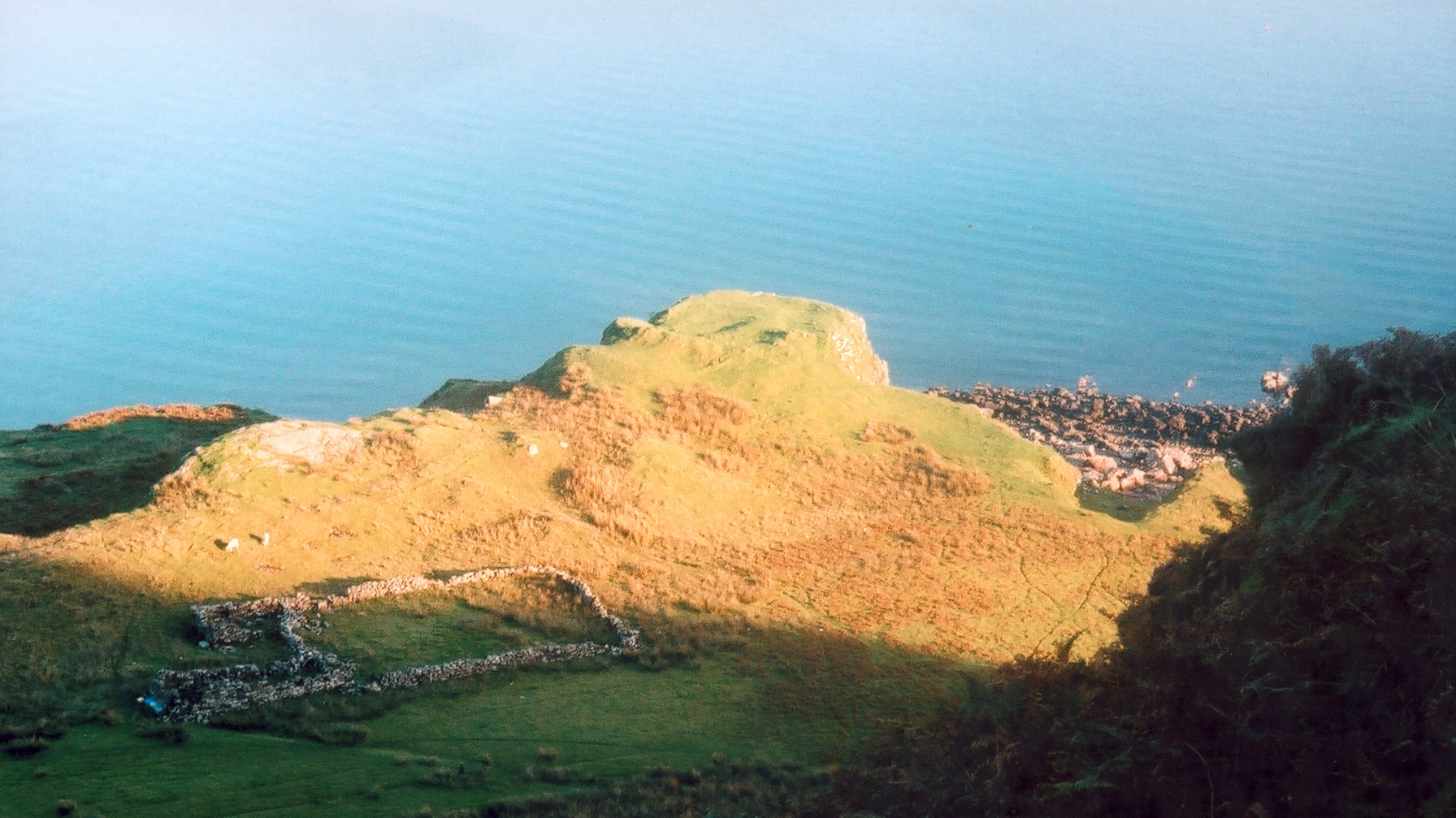
The dun & abandoned homestead

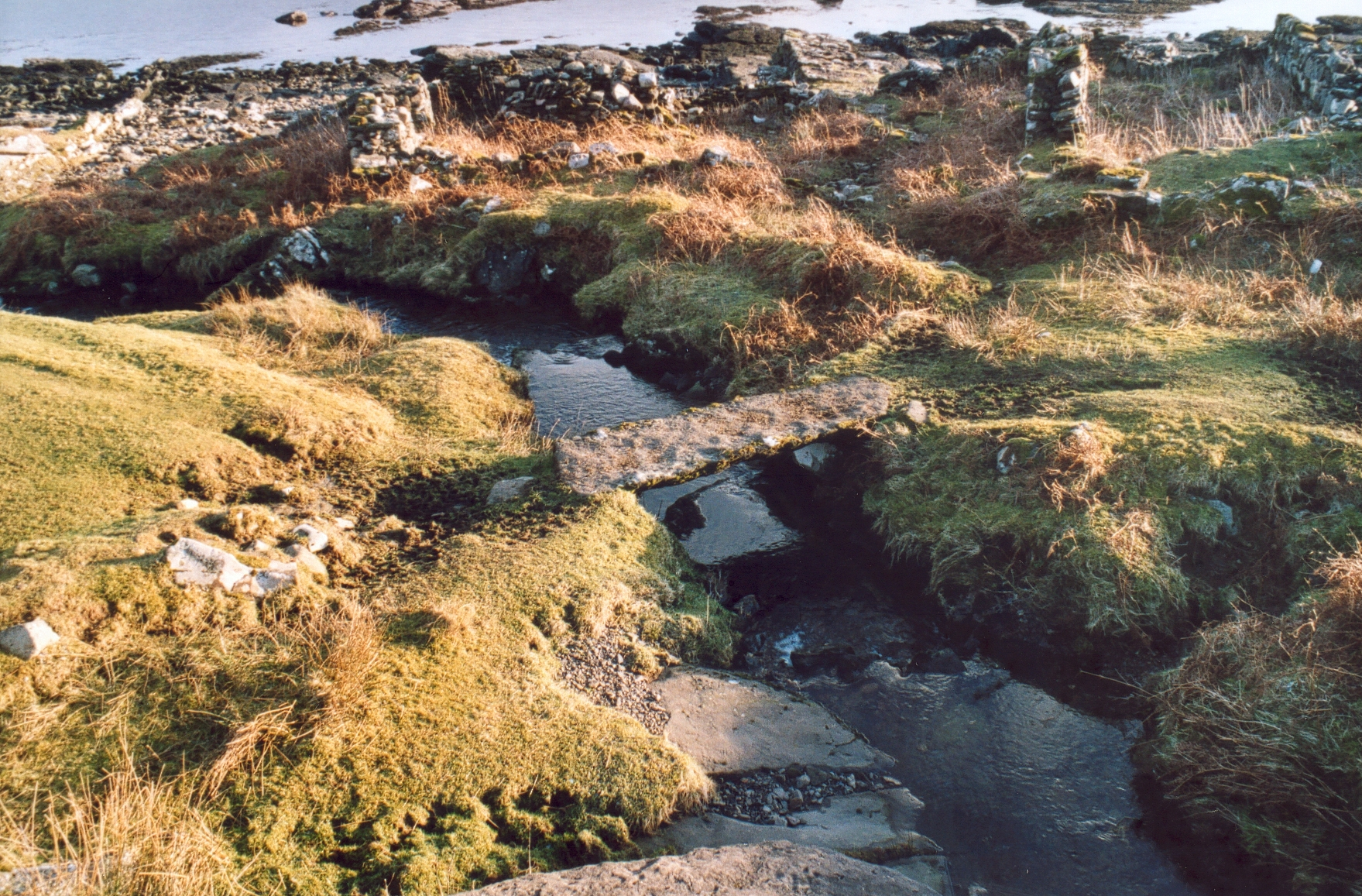
The Bridge of Glagan-Glùine
