= Peinachorran =

Coordinates: 57.32937°N 6.0941°W

Peinchorran: Scottish Gaelic: Peighinn a' Chorrain
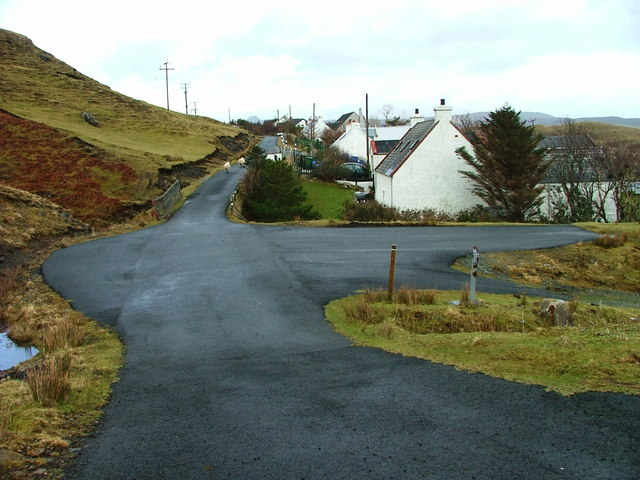

- Location within the Isle of Skye
- OS grid reference: NG524331
- Council area: Highland
- Country: Scotland
- Sovereign state: United Kingdom
- Post town: Portree
- Postcode district: IV51
- Police: Scotland
- Fire: Scottish
- Ambulance: Scottish

Peinchorran (Scottish Gaelic: Peighinn a' Chorrain; Peinachorrain on Ordnance Survey maps) is a remote settlement, lying at the end of the B883 road, on the north east headland of Loch Sligachan on the island of Skye in the Highlands of Scotland. It is in the council area of Highland.

Peinchorran is opposite the pier at Sconser on the far side of the loch, the latter being the nearest settlement of any size as the crow flies, although Camastianavaig to the north is closer by road.
