= Inner Hebrides =

Archipelago off the west coast of mainland Scotland

Coordinates: 56°30′N 6°00′W

Na h-Eileanan a-staigh (Gaelic)
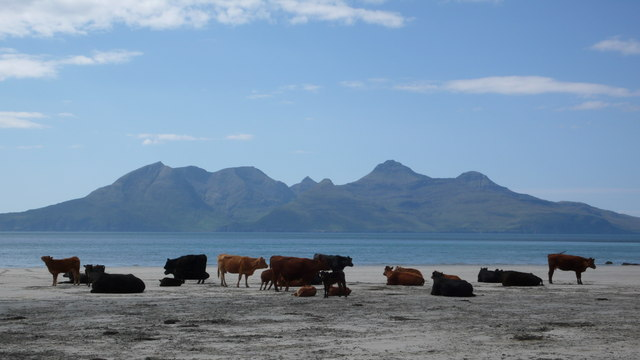
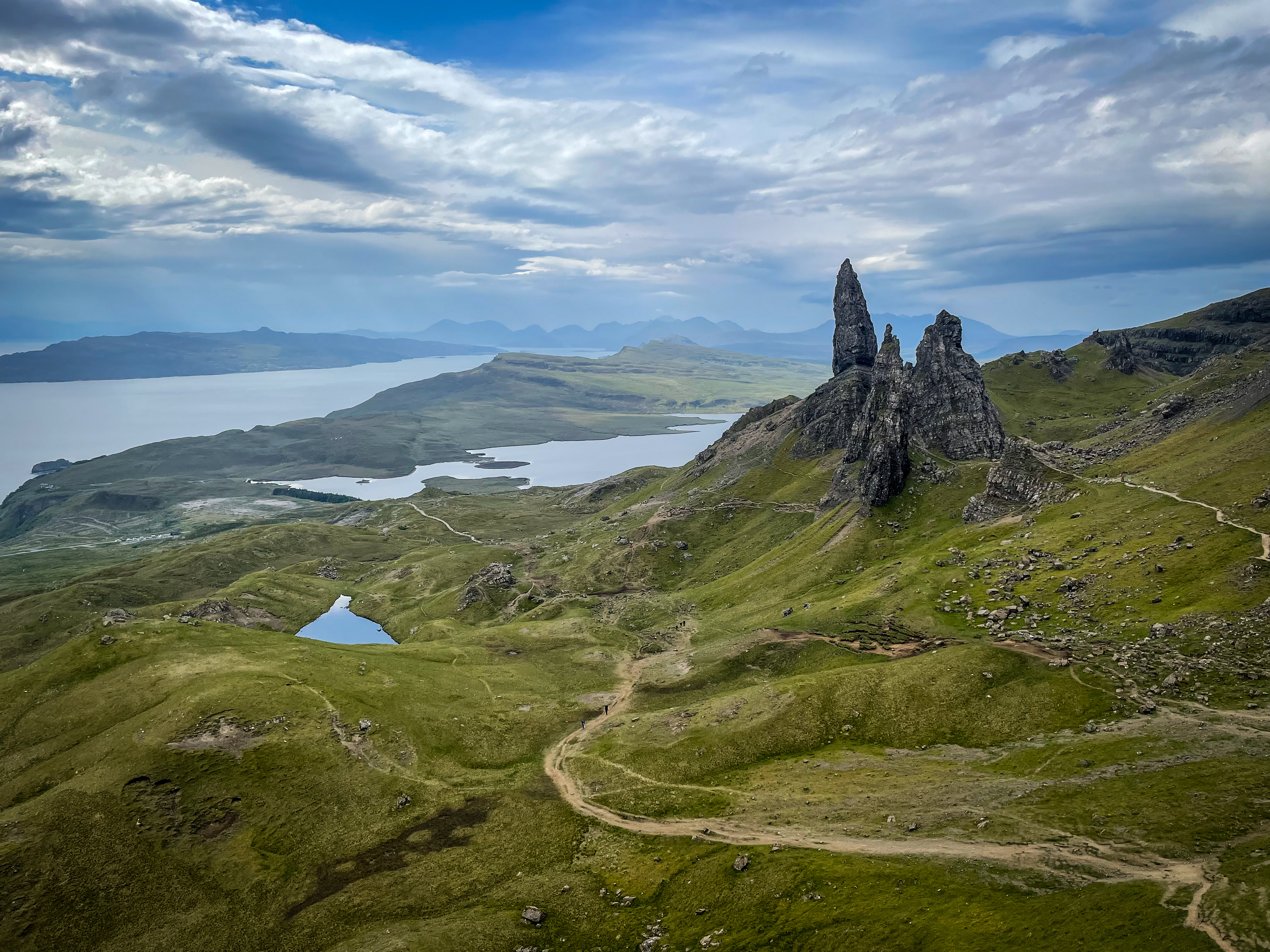
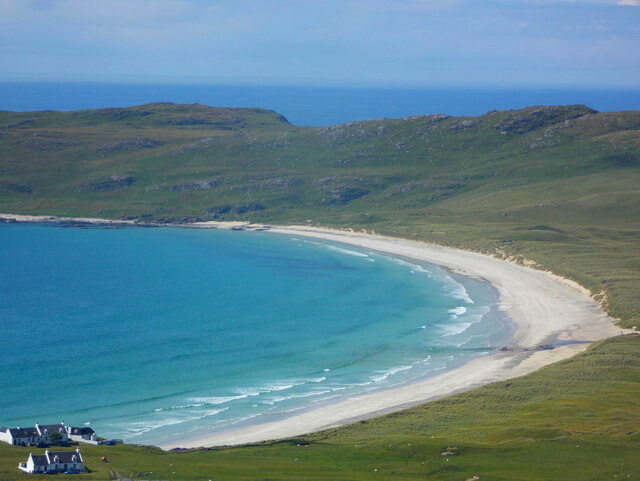
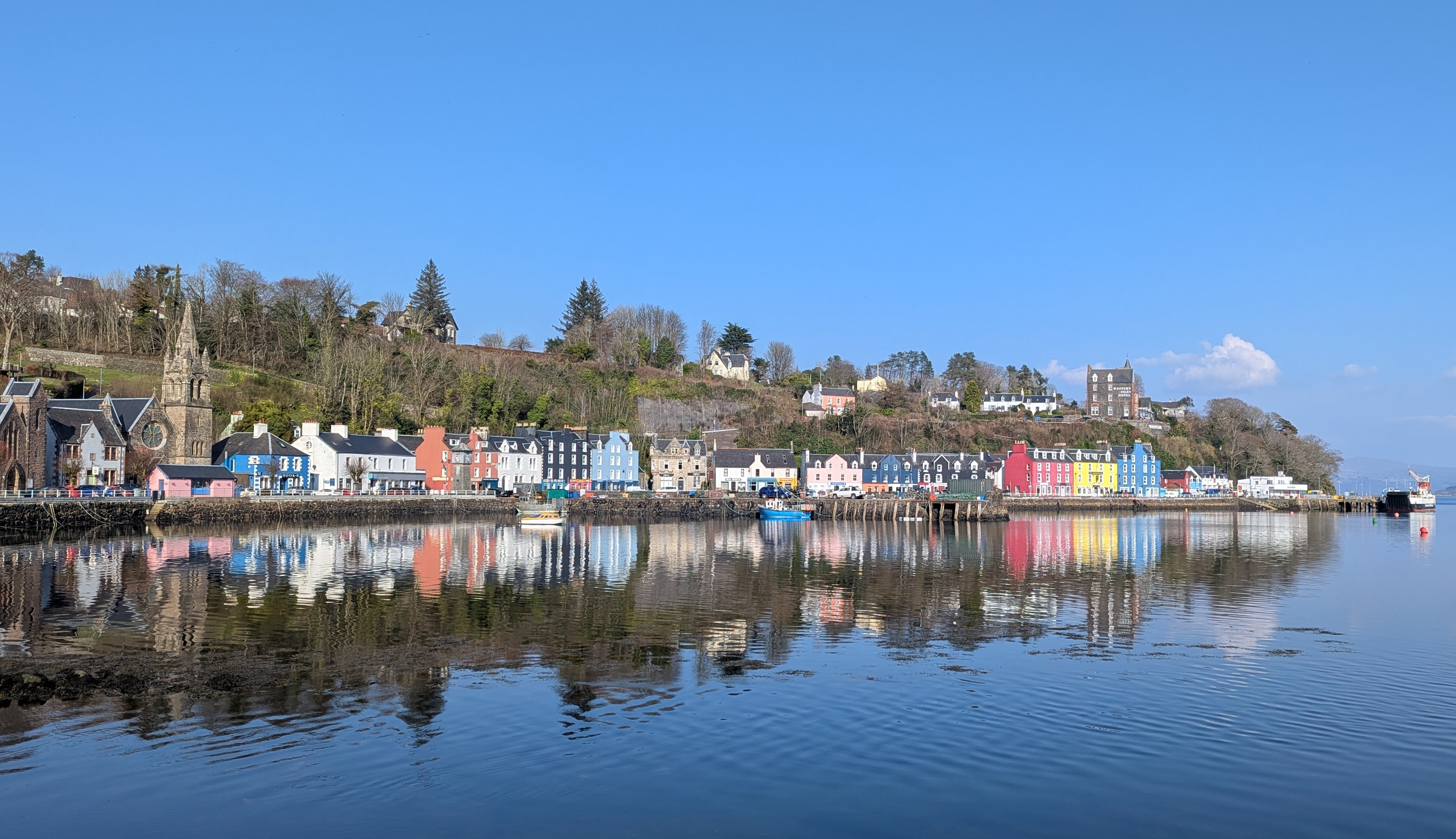
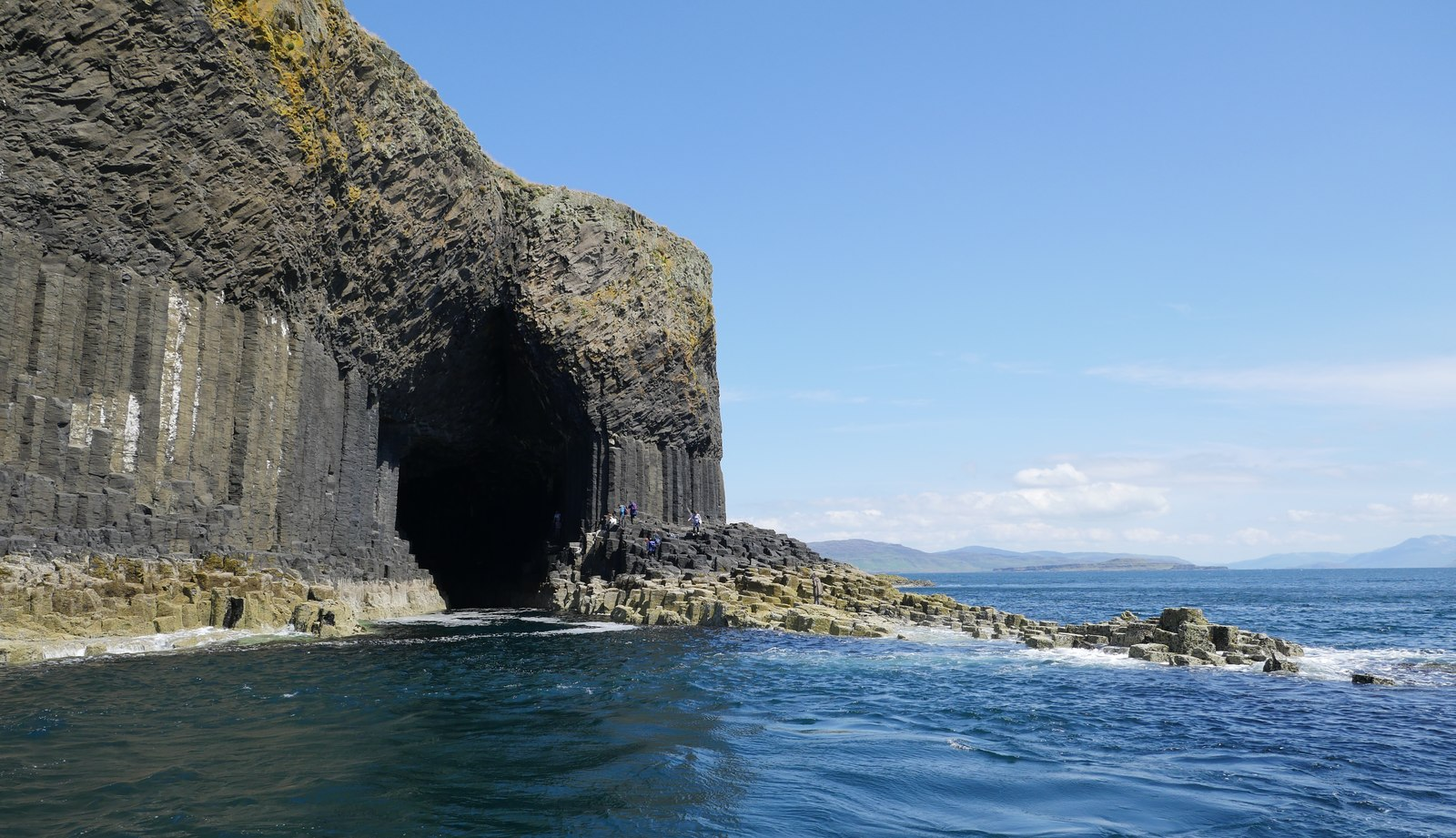
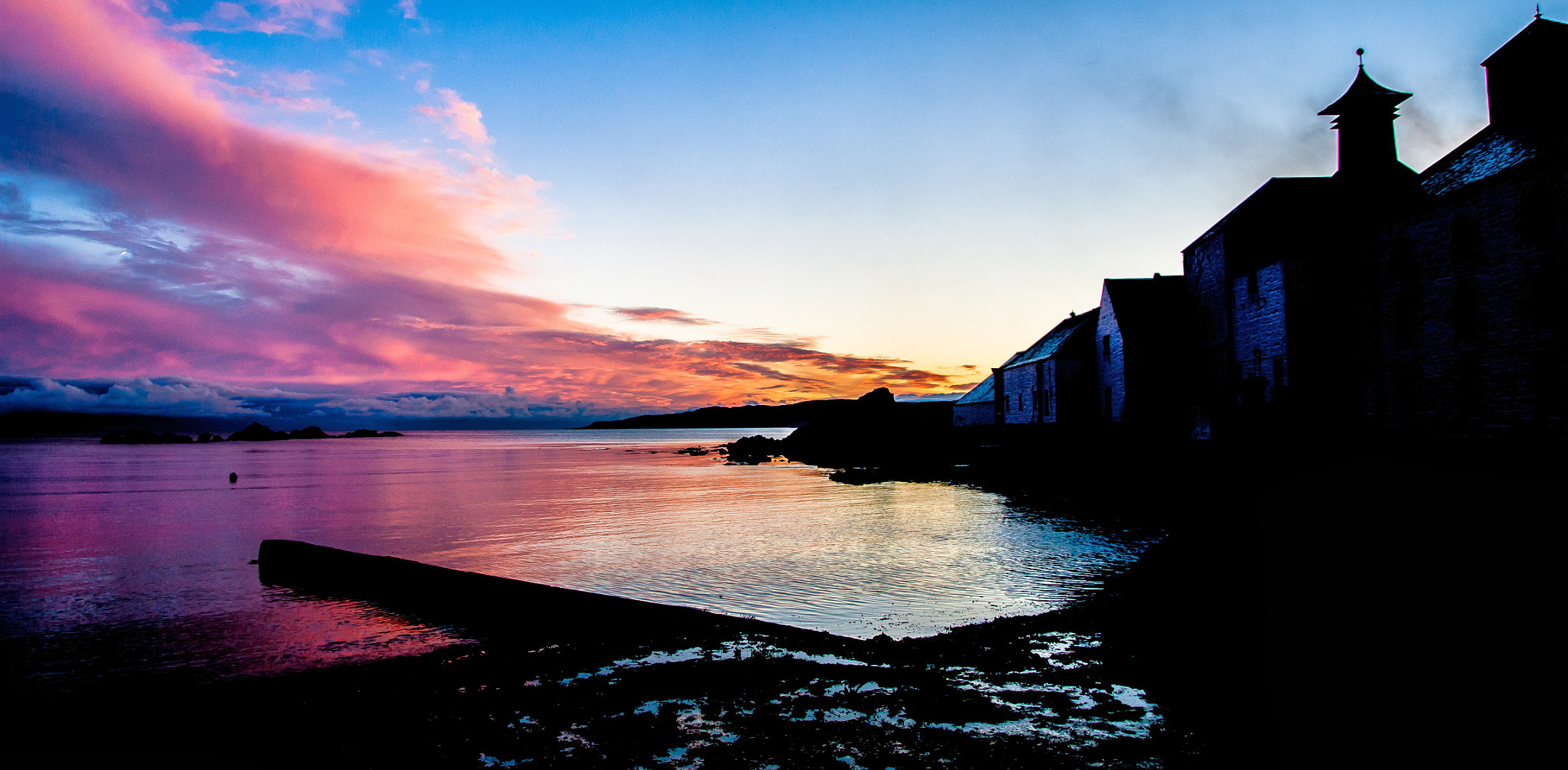
- Rùm from Eigg Old Man of Storr Balephuil, Tiree Tobermory, Mull Fingal's Cave Bowmore, Islay

Location
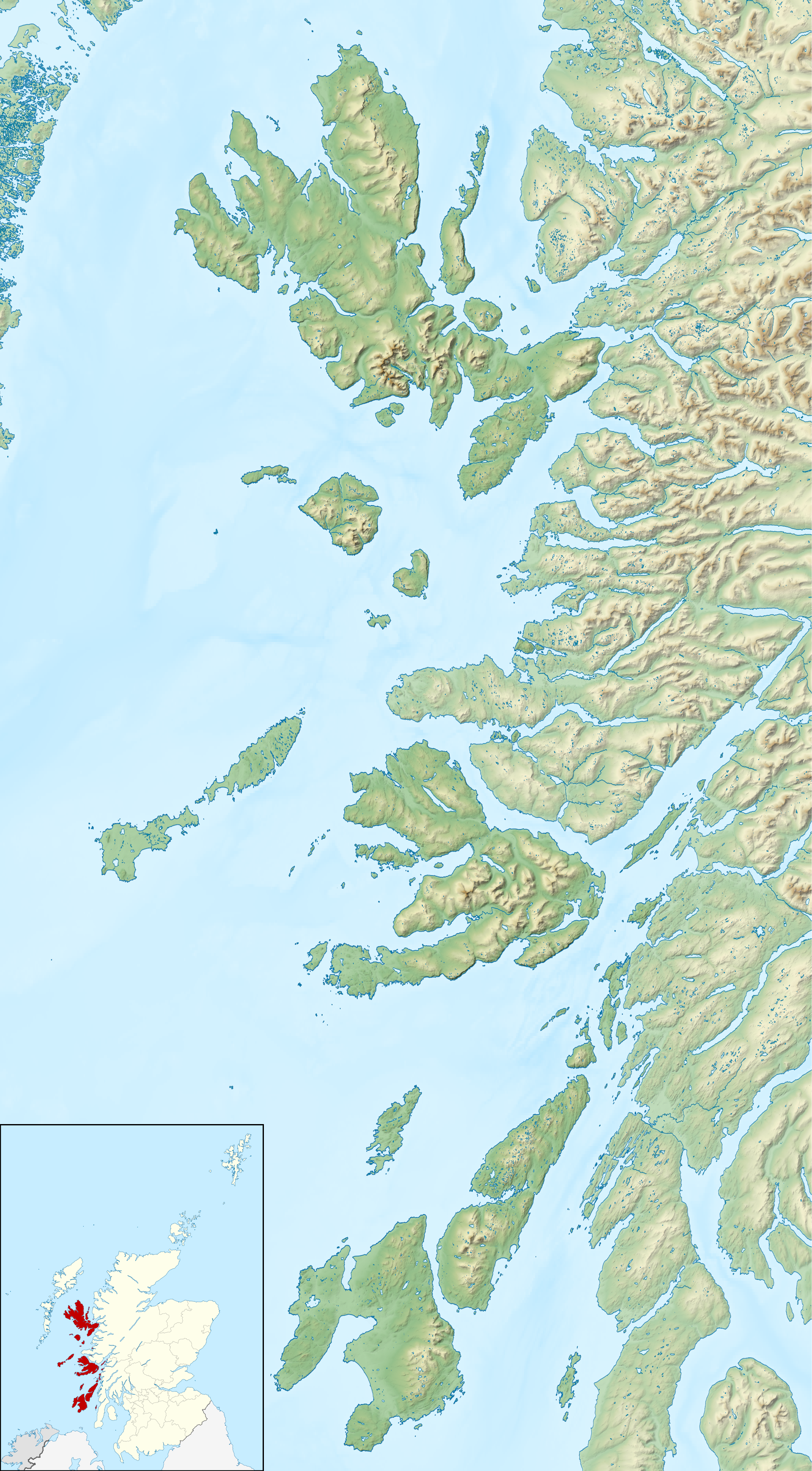
- The Inner Hebrides
- OS grid reference: NM 53928 41384

Name
- Name meaning: The Inner Isles

Physical geography
- Island group: Hebrides
- Area: 1,594 sq mi (4,130 km^{2})
- Highest elevation: Sgùrr Alasdair

Administration
- Council area: Highland; Argyll and Bute
- Country: Scotland
- Sovereign state: United Kingdom

Demographics
- Population: 18,948

The Inner Hebrides (Note: /ˈhɛbrɪdiːz/ HEB-rid-eez; Scottish Gaelic: na h-Eileanan a-staigh, lit. 'the Inner Isles') is an archipelago off the west coast of mainland Scotland, to the south east of the Outer Hebrides. Together these two island chains form the Hebrides, which experience a mild oceanic climate. The Inner Hebrides comprise 35 inhabited islands as well as 44 uninhabited islands with an area greater than 30 hectares (74 acres). Skye, Mull, and Islay are the three largest, and also have the highest populations. The main commercial activities are tourism, crofting, fishing and whisky distilling. In modern times the Inner Hebrides have formed part of two separate local government jurisdictions, one to the north and the other to the south. Together, the islands have an area of about 4,130 km^{2} (1,594 sq mi), and had a population of 18,948 in 2011. The population density is therefore about 4.6 inhabitants per square kilometre (12 inhabitants per square mile).

There are various important prehistoric structures, many of which pre-date the first written references to the islands by Roman and Greek authors. In the historic period the earliest known settlers were Picts to the north and Gaels in the southern kingdom of Dál Riada prior to the islands becoming part of the Suðreyjar kingdom of the Norse, who ruled for over 400 years until sovereignty was transferred to Scotland by the Treaty of Perth in 1266. Control of the islands was then held by various clan chiefs, principally the MacLeans, MacLeods and MacDonalds. The Highland Clearances of the 19th century had a devastating effect on many communities and it is only in recent years that population levels have ceased to decline.

Sea transport is crucial and a variety of ferry services operate to mainland Scotland and between the islands. The Gaelic language remains strong in some areas; the landscapes have inspired a variety of artists; and there is a diversity of wildlife.

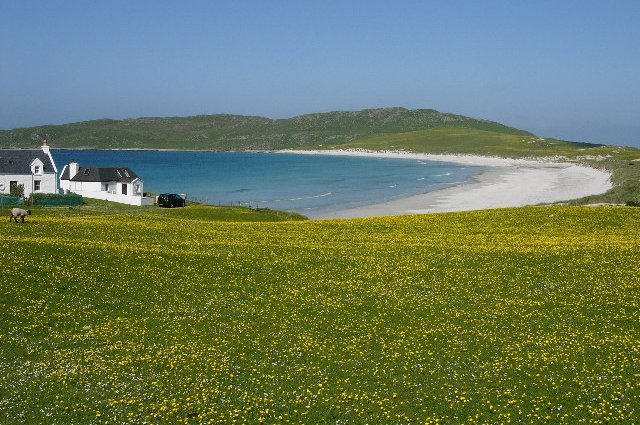
Looking west to Balephuil Bay, Tiree across the machair

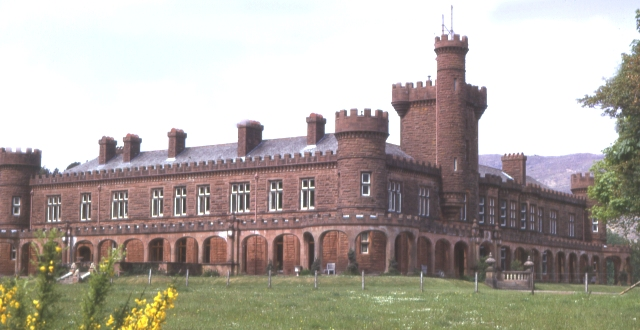
Kinloch Castle, Rùm

== Geography ==
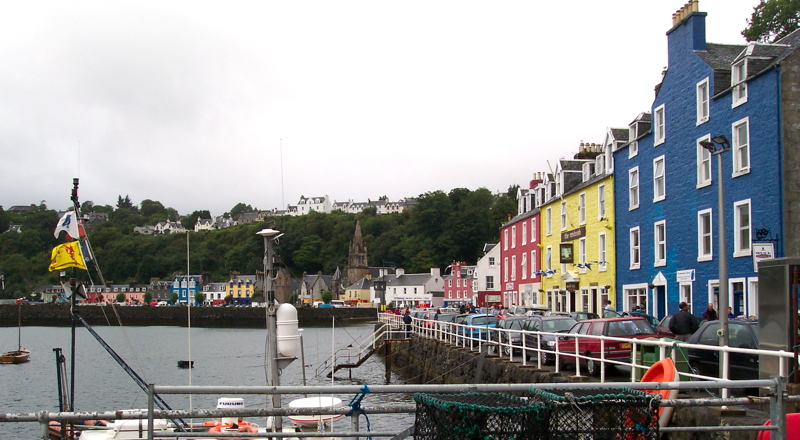
Tobermory, the largest settlement on Mull

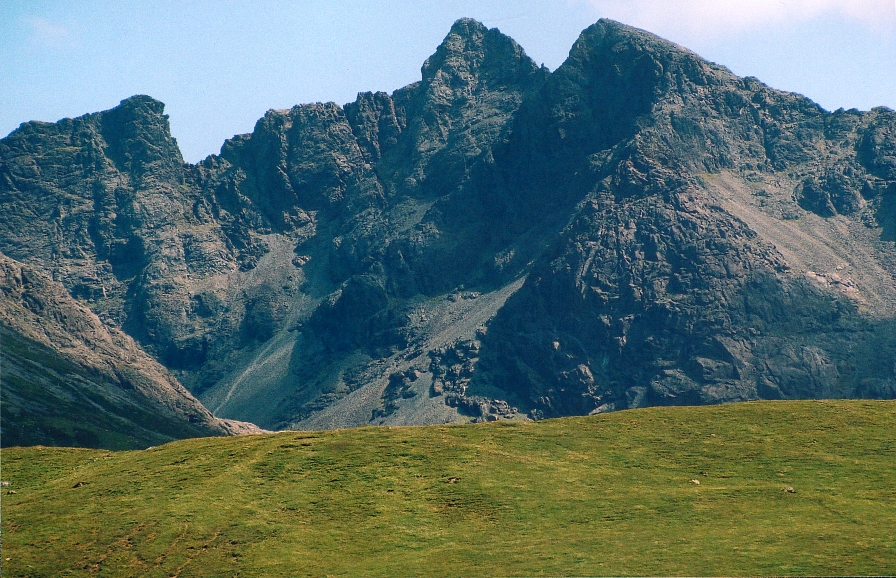
Sgurr Alasdair, the highest peak in the Inner Hebrides

The islands form a disparate archipelago. The largest islands are, from south to north, Islay, Jura, Mull, Rùm and Skye. Skye is the largest and most populous of all with an area of 1,656 km^{2} (639 sq mi) and a population of just over 10,000.

The southern group are in Argyll, an area roughly corresponding with the heartlands of the ancient kingdom of Dál Riata and incorporated into the modern unitary council area of Argyll and Bute. The northern islands were part of the county of Inverness-shire and are now in the Highland Council area.

=== Physical ===
The ten largest islands are as follows.

Island	Gaelic name	Area (ha)	Population (2022)	Highest point	Height (m)	Gaelic Speakers (2011)
Coll	Colla	7,685	176	Ben Hogh	104	
Colonsay	Colbhasa	4,074	117	Carnan Eoin	143	20.2% (15)
Eigg	Eige	3,049	95	An Sgurr	393	
Islay	Ìle	61,956	3,180	Beinn Bheigeir	491	19% (613)
Jura	Diùra	36,692	258	Beinn an Òir	785	
Lismore	Lios Mor	2,351	190	Barr Mòr	127	26.9% (50)
Mull	Muile	87,535	3,063	Ben More	966	
Raasay	Ratharsair	6,231	187	Dùn Caan	444	30.4% (48)
Rùm	Rùm	10,463	31	Askival	812	
Skye	An t-Eilean Sgitheanach or Eilean a' Cheò	165,625	10,496	Sgurr Alasdair	993	29.4% (2,942)
Tiree	Tiriodh	7,834	700	Ben Hynish	141	38.3% (250)

The geology and geomorphology of the islands is varied. Some, such as Skye and Mull, are mountainous, whilst others like Tiree are relatively low-lying. The highest mountains are the Cuillins of Skye, although peaks over 300 metres (980 ft) are common elsewhere. Much of the coastline is machair, a fertile low-lying dune pastureland. Many of the islands are swept by strong tides, and the Corryvreckan tide race between Scarba and Jura is one of the largest whirlpools in the world.

There are various smaller archipelagoes including the Ascrib Islands, Crowlin Islands, Slate Islands, Small Isles, Summer Isles and Treshnish Islands.

The islands are shown to be important as a region of tidal mixing of coastal water.

=== Human ===
Historical population
Year	Pop.	±%
2001	18,257	—
2011	18,948	+3.8%

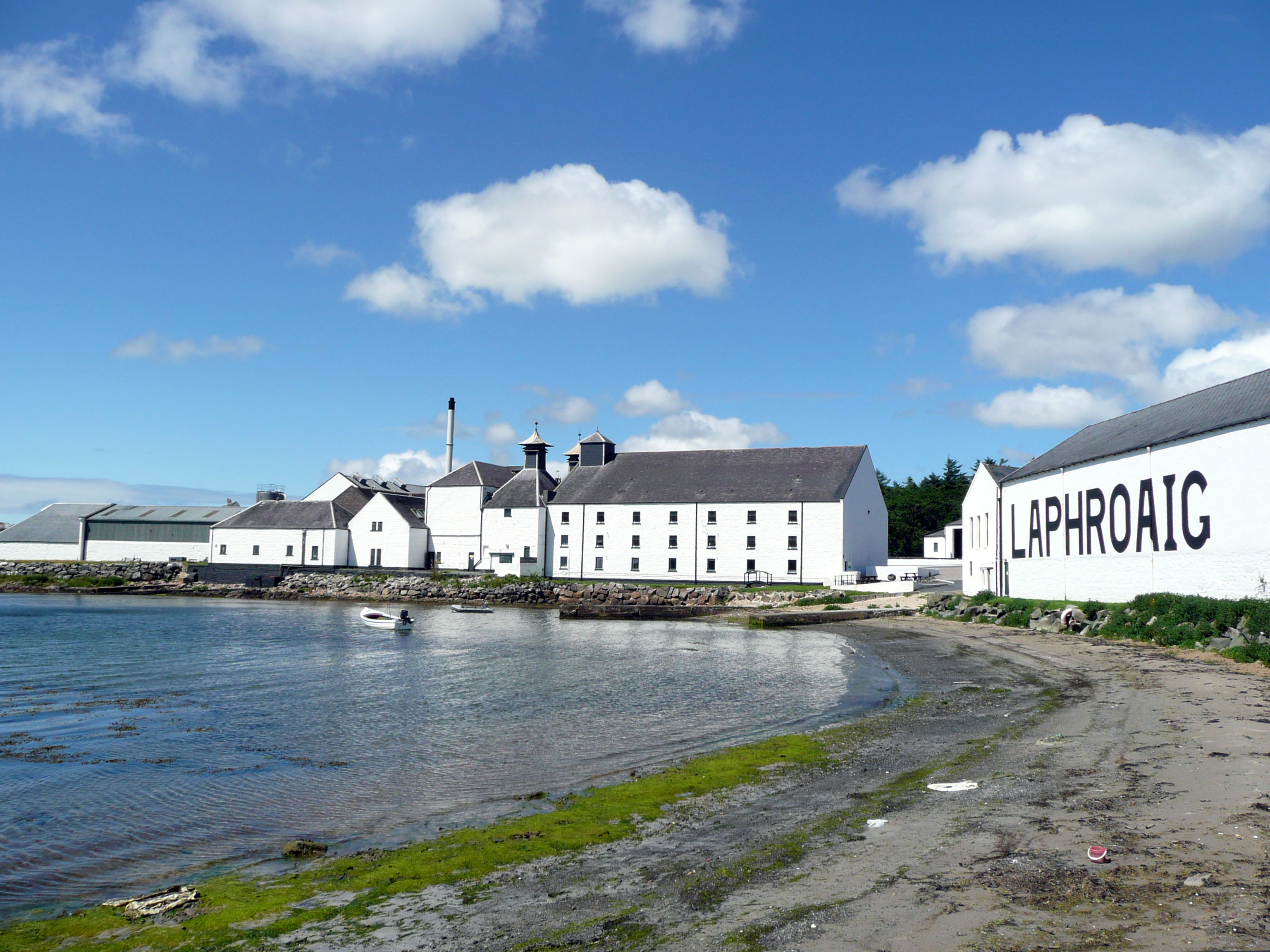
Laphroaig distillery, Islay

The inhabited islands of the Inner Hebrides had a population of 18,257 at the 2001 census, and this grew to 18,948 in 2011. During the same period Scottish island populations as a whole grew by 4% to 103,702. There are a further 44 uninhabited Inner Hebrides with an area greater than 30 ha (74 acres). (Note: There are 43 such islands recorded at List of Inner Hebrides and in addition there is Lunga, which had a population in 2001 but not in 2011.) Records for the last date of settlement for the smaller islands are incomplete, but most of them were inhabited at some point during the Neolithic, Iron Age, Early Historic or Norse periods. In common with the other main island chains of Scotland, many of the smaller and more remote islands were abandoned during the 19th and 20th centuries, in some cases after continuous habitation since prehistoric times. These islands had been perceived as relatively self-sufficient agricultural economies, but a view developed among both islanders and outsiders that the more remote islands lacked the essential services of a modern industrial economy. However, the populations of the larger islands grew overall by more than 12% from 1981 to 2001.

The main commercial activities are tourism, crofting, fishing and whisky distilling (centred on Islay but also including Talisker in Skye, Isle of Jura Single Malt and Tobermory and Ledaig in Mull). Overall, the area is relatively reliant on primary industries and the public sector; there is a dependence on self-employment and micro-business, and most parts are defined by Highlands and Islands Enterprise as economically "Fragile Areas". However, the islands are well placed to exploit renewable energy, particularly onshore and offshore wind; and the Sleat peninsula of Skye is an example of a more economically robust area. Some of the islands have development trusts that support the local economy.

=== Climate ===
The influence of the Atlantic Ocean and the North Atlantic Current creates a mild oceanic climate. Temperatures are generally cool, averaging 6.5 °C (44 °F) in January and 15.4 °C (60 °F) in July at Duntulm on the Trotternish peninsula of Skye. Snow seldom lies at sea level and frosts are fewer than on the mainland. Winds are a limiting factor for vegetation: a speed of 128 km/h (80 mph) has been recorded; south-westerlies are the most common. Rainfall is generally high at between 1,300 and 2,000 millimetres (51 and 79 inches) per annum, and the mountains and hills are wetter still. Tiree is one of the sunniest places in the country and had 300 days of sunshine in 1975. Trotternish typically has 200 hours of bright sunshine in May, the sunniest month.

Climate data for Duntulm, Skye
Month	Jan	Feb	Mar	Apr	May	Jun	Jul	Aug	Sep	Oct	Nov	Dec	Year
Mean daily maximum °C (°F)	6.5 (43.7)	6.6 (43.9)	8.1 (46.6)	9.6 (49.3)	12.4 (54.3)	14.3 (57.7)	15.4 (59.7)	15.7 (60.3)	14.2 (57.6)	11.5 (52.7)	9.1 (48.4)	7.6 (45.7)	10.9 (51.6)
Mean daily minimum °C (°F)	2.4 (36.3)	2.2 (36.0)	3.3 (37.9)	4.3 (39.7)	6.5 (43.7)	8.7 (47.7)	10.4 (50.7)	10.7 (51.3)	9.4 (48.9)	7.2 (45.0)	5.1 (41.2)	3.6 (38.5)	6.2 (43.2)
Average precipitation mm (inches)	148 (5.84)	100 (3.93)	82 (3.24)	86 (3.40)	73 (2.87)	85 (3.35)	97 (3.83)	112 (4.41)	128 (5.05)	152 (6.00)	143 (5.63)	142 (5.58)	1,350 (53.13)

== Prehistory ==
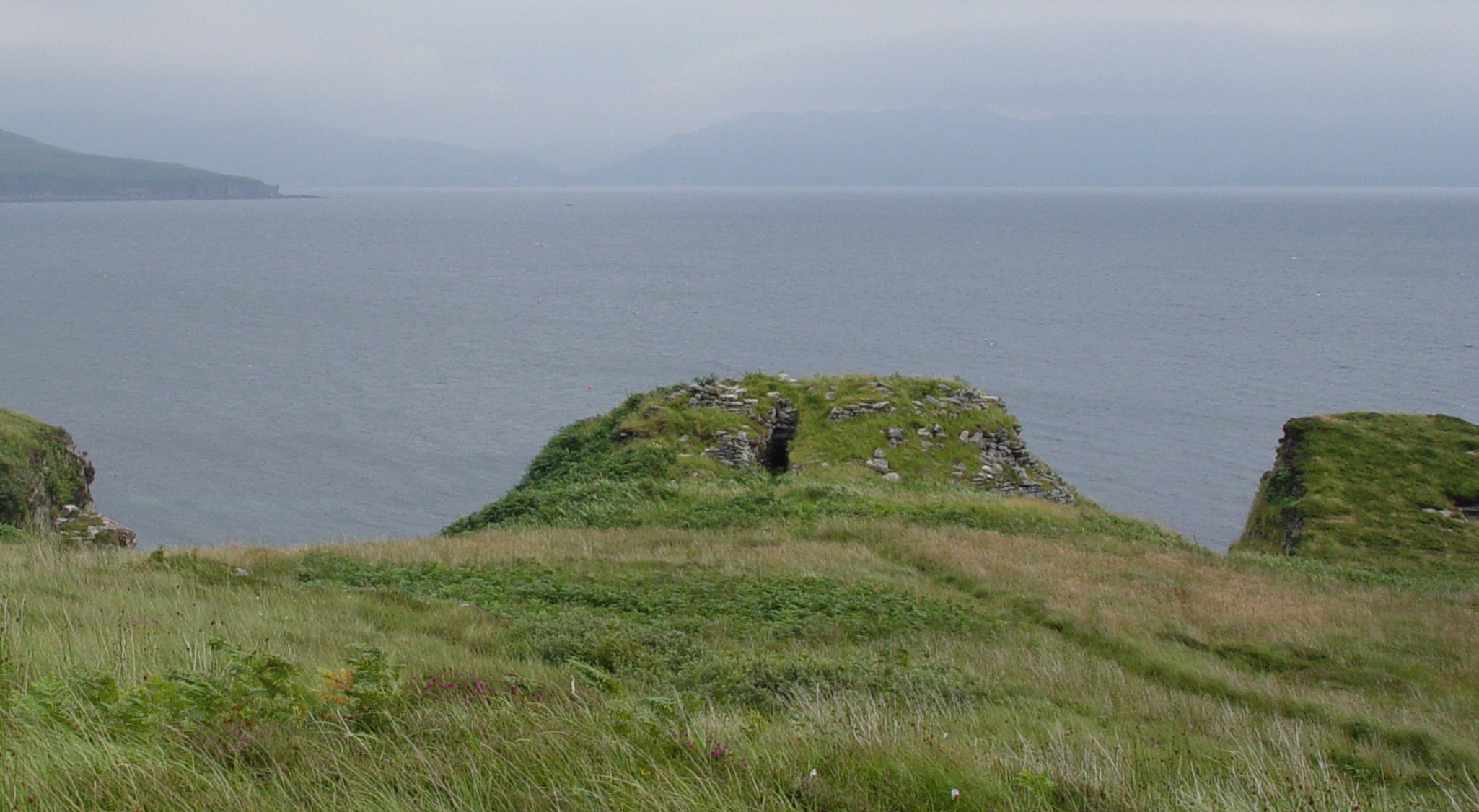
The ruins of Dun Ringill, near Elgol on the island of Skye

The Hebrides were originally settled in the Mesolithic era and have a diversity of prehistoric sites. A flint arrowhead found in a field near Bridgend, Islay has been dated to 10,800 BC. This find may indicate the presence of a summer hunting party rather than permanent settlement. Burnt hazelnut shells and microscopic charcoal found at Farm Fields, Kinloch on Rùm indicate a settlement of some kind and this is amongst the oldest evidence of occupation in Scotland.

Evidence of large-scale Mesolithic nut processing, radiocarbon dated to circa 7000 BC, has been found in a midden pit at Staosnaig on Colonsay. The dig discovered the remains of hundreds of thousands of burned hazelnut shells and gives an insight into communal activity and forward planning in the period. The nuts were harvested in a single year and pollen analysis suggests that the hazel trees were all cut down at the same time. The scale of the activity, unparalleled elsewhere in Scotland, and the lack of large game on the island, suggests the possibility that Colonsay contained a community with a largely vegetarian diet for the time they spent on the island.

Three stone hearths and traces of red ochre found on Jura and dated to 6000 BC are the earliest stone-built structures found so far in Scotland. However, in general the Neolithic sites in the Inner Hebrides lack the scale and drama of those found in Orkney and the Western Isles. (Note: See for example Cladh Hallan and the impressive ruins of the Callanish Stones and Skara Brae.) There are numerous Iron Age sites including the remains of Dun Ringill fort on Skye, which are similar in layout to that of both a broch and a complex Atlantic roundhouse.

== Etymology ==
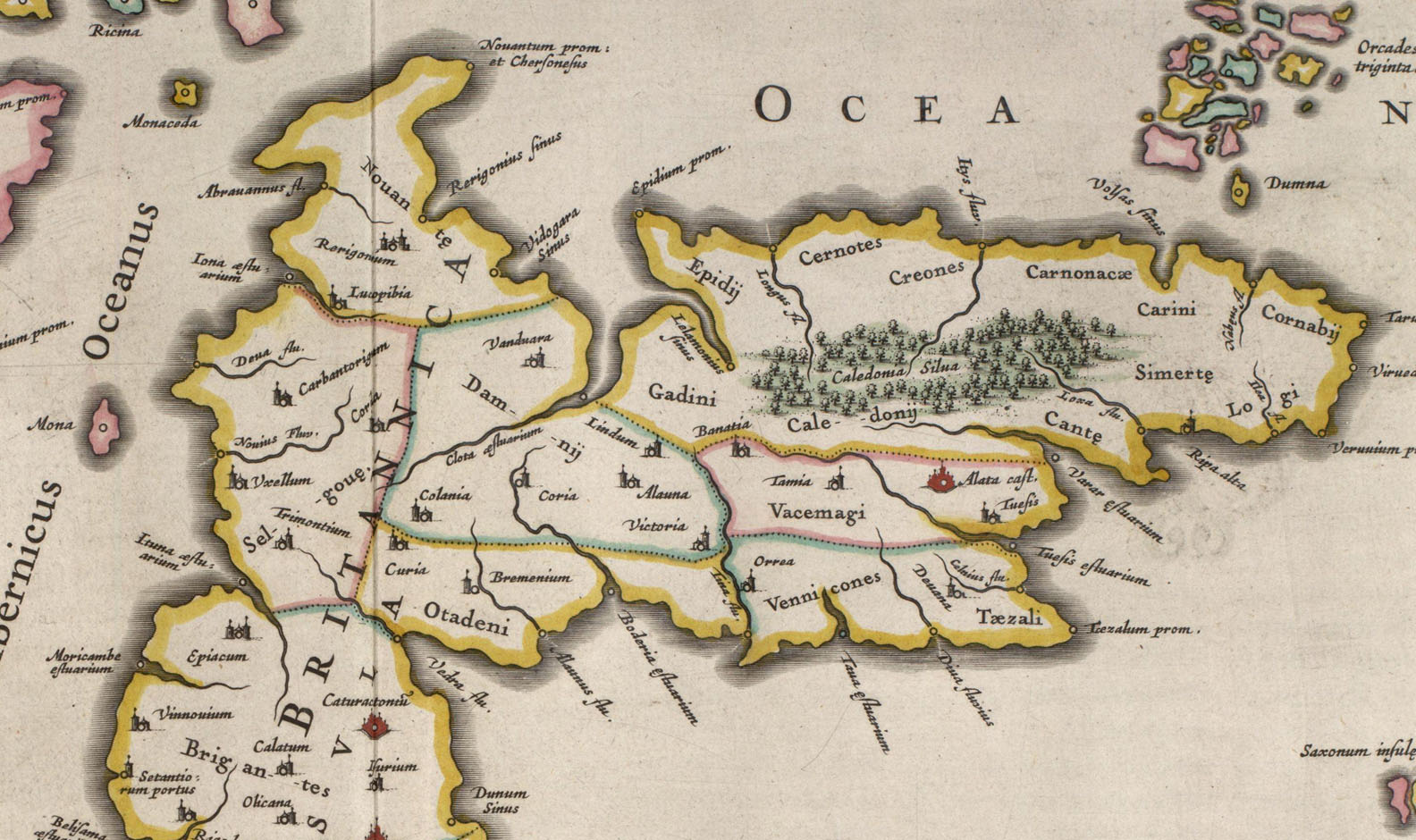
"Old Britain" as shown on Blaeu's 1654 atlas of Scotland, based on Ptolemy.

The earliest extant written reference to these islands appears in Pliny the Elder's Natural History, where he states that there are 30 "Hebudes". Ptolemy, writing about 80 years later, around AD 140–150 and drawing on the earlier naval expedition of Agricola, refers to the Ἐβοῦδαι ("Eboudai") ("Ebudes" or "Ebudae" in Latin translation) of which he writes that there were only five, thus possibly specifically meaning the Inner Hebrides. Pliny probably took his information from Pytheas of Massilia who visited Britain sometime between 322 and 285 BC. It is possible that Ptolemy did so also, as Agricola's information about the west coast of Scotland was of poor quality.

Watson (1926) states that the meaning of Ptolemy's "Eboudai" is unknown and that the root may be pre-Celtic. (Note: Murray (1966) claims that Ptolemy's "Ebudae" was originally derived from the Old Norse Havbredey, meaning "isles on the edge of the sea". The idea is often repeated, but no firm evidence of this derivation has emerged.) Other early written references include the flight of the Nemed people from Ireland to "Domon and to Erdomon in the north of Alba", which is mentioned in the 12th century Lebor Gabála Érenn. Domon, meaning the "deep sea isle" refers to the Outer Hebrides and Erdomon, meaning "east of, on or near Domon" is thus the Inner Hebrides.

The individual island and place names in the Outer Hebrides have mixed Gaelic and Norse origins.

== History ==
=== Dál Riata ===
Although Ptolemy's map identifies various tribes such as the Creones that might conceivably have lived in the Inner Hebrides in the Roman era, the first written records of life begin in the 6th century CE when the founding of the kingdom of Dál Riata is recorded. This encompassed roughly what is now Argyll and Bute and Lochaber in Scotland and County Antrim in Ireland.

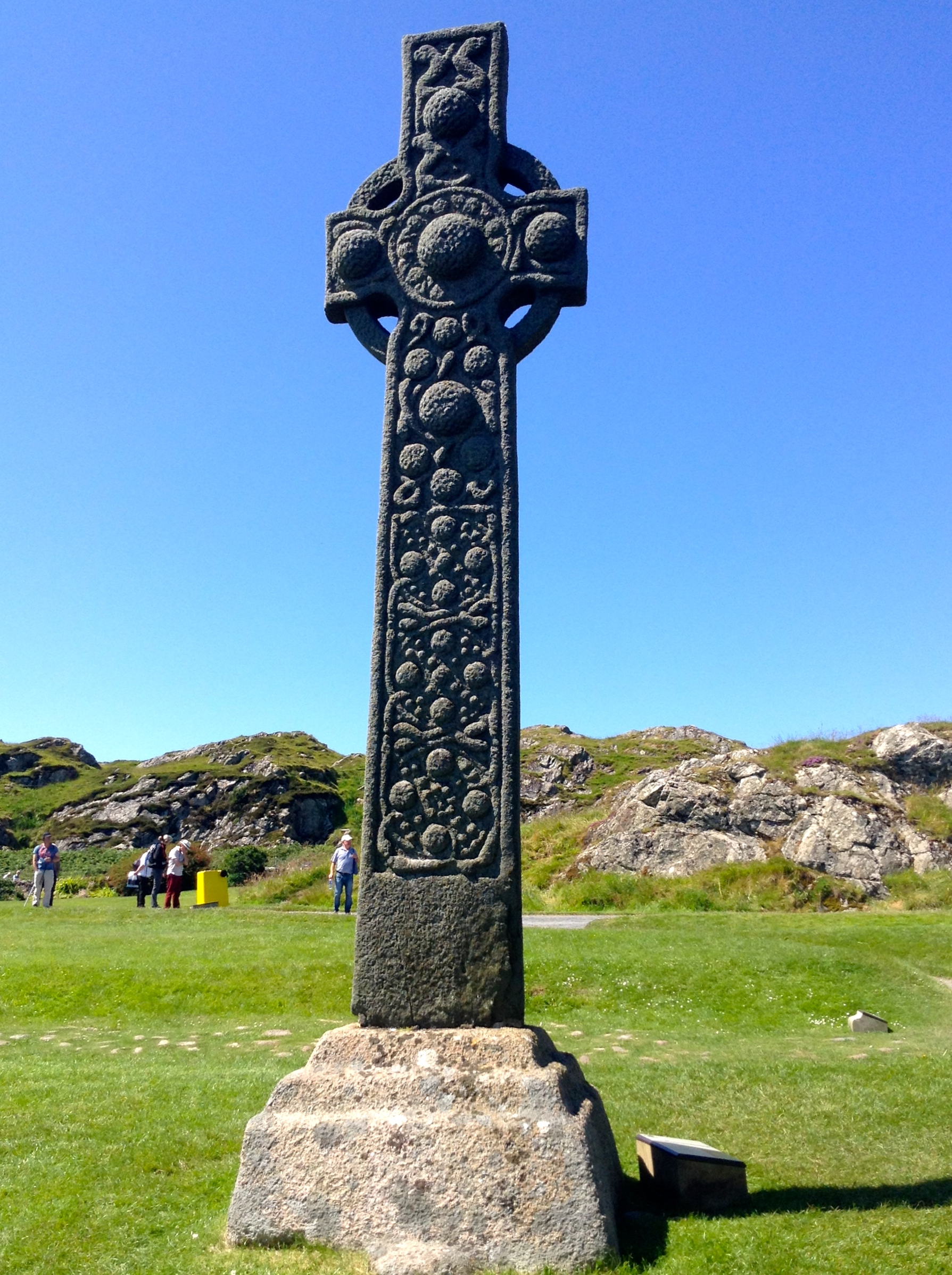
The eighth century St Martin's Cross on Iona

In Argyll it consisted initially of three main kindreds: Cenél Loairn in north and mid-Argyll, Cenél nÓengusa based on Islay and Cenél nGabráin based in Kintyre. By the end of the 7th century a fourth kindred, Cenél Comgaill had emerged, based in eastern Argyll.

The figure of Columba looms large in any history of Dál Riata and his founding of a monastery on Iona ensured that Dál Riata would be of great importance in the spread of Christianity in northern Britain. However, Iona was far from unique. Lismore in the territory of the Cenél Loairn, was sufficiently important for the death of its abbots to be recorded with some frequency and many smaller sites, such as on Eigg, Hinba and Tiree, are known from the annals. The kingdom's independent existence ended in the Viking Age, and it eventually merged with the lands of the Picts to form the Kingdom of Alba.

North of Dál Riata the Inner Hebrides were nominally under Pictish control although the historical record is sparse. (Note: Hunter (2000) states that in relation to King Bridei I of the Picts in the sixth century: "As for Shetland, Orkney, Skye and the Western Isles, their inhabitants, most of whom appear to have been Pictish in culture and speech at this time, are likely to have regarded Bridei as a fairly distant presence.")

=== Norse rule ===
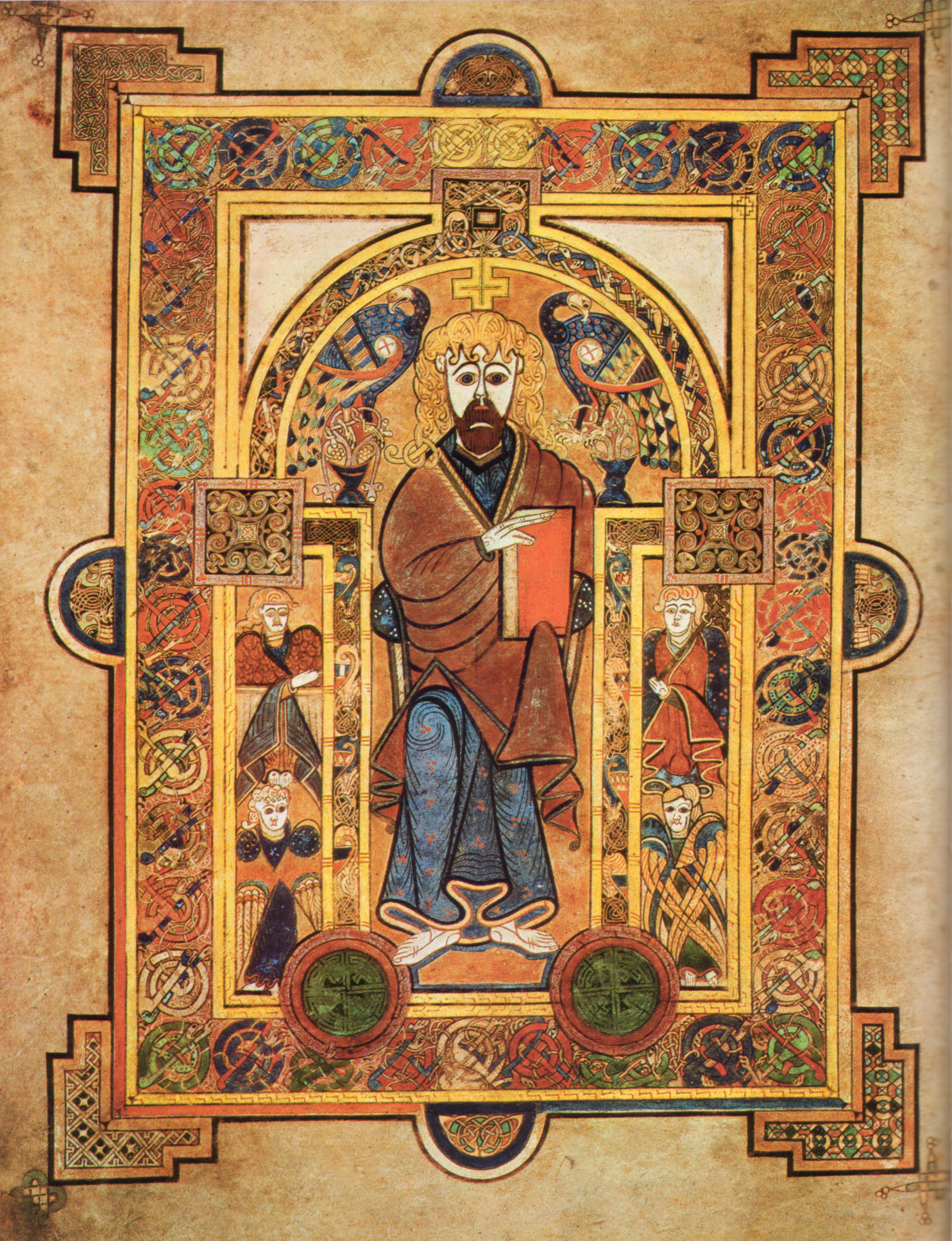
Folio 32v of the Book of Kells which may have been produced by the monks of Iona and taken to Ireland for safekeeping after repeated Viking raids of the Hebrides.

According to Ó Corráin (1998) "when and how the Vikings conquered and occupied the Isles is unknown, perhaps unknowable" although from 793 onwards repeated raids by Vikings on the British Isles are recorded. "All the islands of Britain" were devastated in 794 with Iona being sacked in 802 and 806. In 870 Dumbarton was besieged by Amlaíb Conung and Ímar, "the two kings of the Northmen". It is therefore likely that Scandinavian hegemony was already significant on the western coasts of Scotland by then. In the 9th century the first references to the Gallgáedil (i.e. "foreign Gaels") appear. This term was variously used in succeeding centuries to refer to individuals of mixed Scandinavian-Celtic descent and/or culture who became dominant in south-west Scotland, parts of Northern England and the isles.

The early 10th century are an obscure period so far as the Hebrides are concerned but Aulaf mac Sitric, who fought at the Battle of Brunanburh in 937 is recorded as a King of the Isles from c. 941 to 980.

It is difficult to reconcile the records of the Irish annals with Norse sources such as the Orkneyinga Saga but it is likely that Norwegian and Gallgáedil Uí Ímair warlords fought for control for much of period from the 9th to the 12th centuries. In 990 Sigurd the Stout, Earl of Orkney took command of the Hebrides, a position he retained for most of the period until he was killed at the Battle of Clontarf in 1014. There is then a period of uncertainty but it is possible that Sigurd's son Thorfinn the Mighty became ruler circa 1035 until his own death some two decades later.

By the late 12th century Irish influence became a significant feature of island life and Diarmait mac Maíl na mBó, the High King of Ireland took possession of Mann and the Isles until 1072. The records for the rulers of the Hebrides are obscured again until the arrival of Godred Crovan as King of Dublin and the Isles. The ancestor of many of the succeeding rulers of Mann and the Isles, he was eventually ousted by Muirchertach Ua Briain and fled to Islay, where he died in the plague of 1095. It is not clear the extent to which Ui Briain dominance was now asserted in the islands north of Man, but growing Irish influence in these seas brought a rapid and decisive response from Norway.

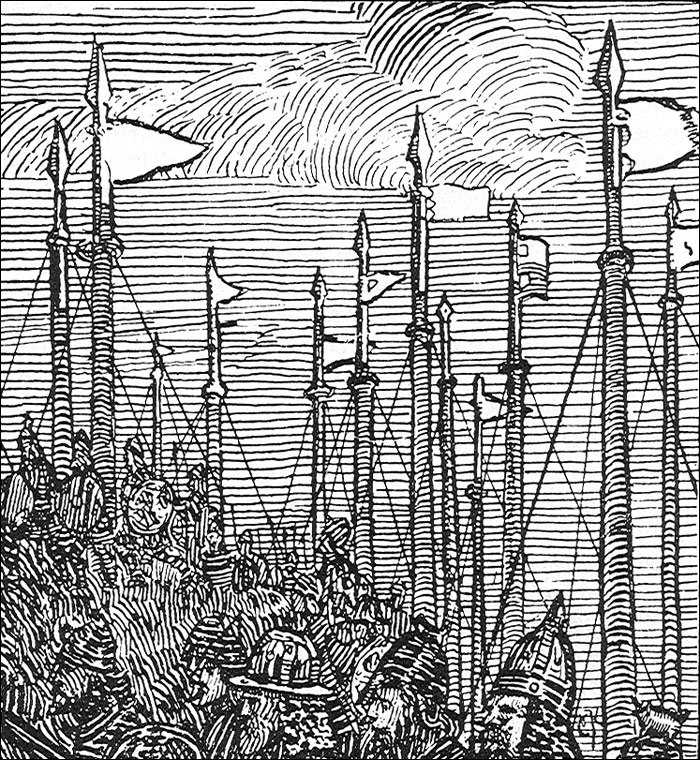
19th-century depiction of Magnus Barelegs's forces in Ireland, before his death in 1103.

Magnus Barelegs had re-established direct Norwegian overlordship by 1098. A second expedition in 1102 saw incursions into Ireland but in August 1103 he was killed fighting in Ulster. The next king of the isles was Lagmann Godredsson and there followed a succession of Godred Crovan's descendants who, (as vassals of the kings of Norway) ruled the Hebrides north of Ardnamurchan for the next 160 years. However, their control of the southern Inner Hebrides was lost with the emergence of Somerled, the self-styled Lord of Argyle. (Note: Hunter (2004) states that the claims of Somerled's descent from Gofraid mac Fergusa are "preserved in Gaelic tradition and accepted as broadly authentic by modern scholars". However, Woolf (2005) asserts that "contrary to the image, projected by recent clan-historians, of Clann Somhairle as Gaelic nationalists liberating the Isles from Scandinavians, it is quite explicit in our two extended narrative accounts from the thirteenth century, Orkneyinga saga and The Chronicle of the Kings of Man and the Isles, that the early leaders of Clann Somhairle saw themselves as competitors for the kingship of the Isles on the basis of their descent through their mother Ragnhilt" and that their claim "to royal status was based on its position as a segment of Uí Ímair.")

For a while Somerled took control of Mann and the Hebrides in toto, but he met his death in 1164 during an invasion of the mainland. At this point Godred the Black, grandson of Godred Crovan re-took possession of the northern Hebrides and the southern isles were distributed amongst Somerled's sons, his descendants eventually becoming known as the Lords of the Isles, and giving rise to Clan MacDougall, Clan Donald and Clan Macruari. However, both during and after Somerled's life the Scottish monarchs sought to take a control of the islands he and his descendants held. This strategy eventually led to an invasion by Haakon Haakonarson, King of Norway. After the stalemate of the Battle of Largs, Haakon retreated to Orkney, where he died in 1263. Following this expedition, the Hebrides and Mann and all rights that the Norwegian crown "had of old therein" were yielded to the Kingdom of Scotland as a result of the 1266 Treaty of Perth.

=== Clans and Scottish rule ===
The Lords of the Isles, a phrase first recorded in 1336, but which title may have been used earlier, would continue to rule the Inner Hebrides as well as part of the Western Highlands as subjects of the King of Scots until John MacDonald, fourth Lord of the Isles, squandered the family's powerful position. Through a secret treaty with Edward IV of England, negotiated at Ardtornish Castle and signed in 1462, he made himself a servant of the English crown. When James III of Scotland found out about the treaty in 1476, he issued a sentence of forfeiture for MacDonald's lands. Some were restored for a promise of good behaviour, but MacDonald was unable to control his son Aonghas Óg, who defeated him at the Battle of Bloody Bay, fought off the coast of Mull near Tobermory in 1481. A further rebellion by his nephew, Alexander of Lochalsh, provoked an exasperated James IV to forfeit the lands for the last time in 1493.

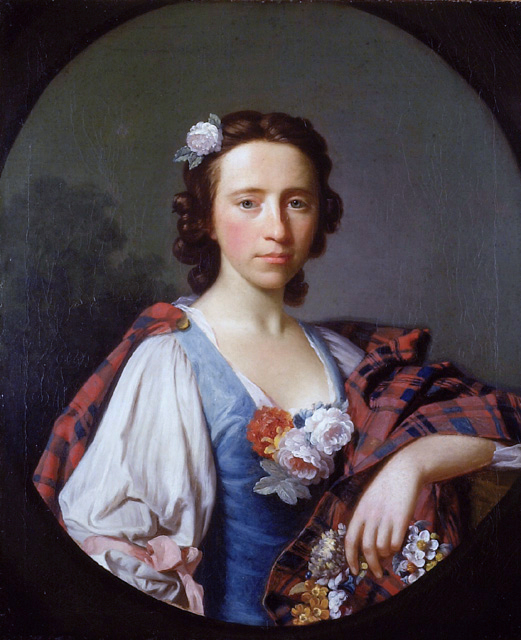
Portrait of Flora MacDonald by Alan Ramsay

The most powerful clans on Skye in the post-Norse period were Clan MacLeod, originally based in Trotternish, and Clan MacDonald of Sleat. Following the disintegration of the Lordship of the Isles, the Mackinnons also emerged as an independent clan, whose substantial landholdings in Skye were centred on Strathaird. The MacDonalds of South Uist were bitter rivals of the MacLeods, and an attempt by the former to murder church-goers at Trumpan in retaliation for a previous massacre on Eigg, resulted in the Battle of the Spoiling Dyke of 1578.

After the failure of the Jacobite rebellion of 1745, Flora MacDonald became famous for rescuing Prince Charles Edward Stuart from the Hanoverian troops. Her story is strongly associated with their escape via Skye and she is buried at Kilmuir. She was visited by Samuel Johnson and James Boswell during their 1773 Journey to the Western Islands of Scotland and written on her gravestone are Johnson's words that hers was "A name that will be mentioned in history, and if courage and fidelity be virtues, mentioned with honour". In the wake of the rebellion the clan system was broken up and islands of the Hebrides became a series of landed estates.

=== British era ===
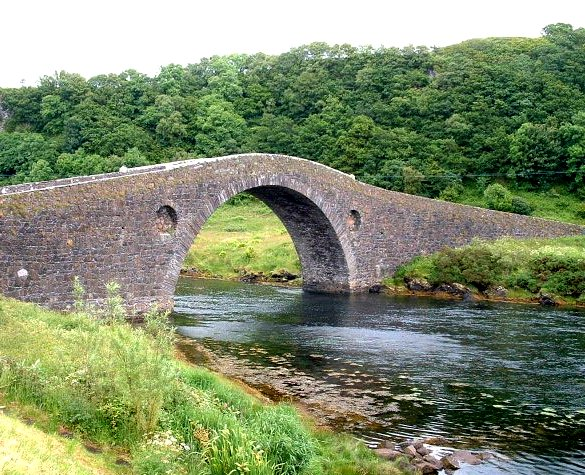
Telford's Clachan Bridge between the mainland and Seil, also known as the "Bridge across the Atlantic", was built in 1792.

With the implementation of the Treaty of Union in 1707 the Hebrides became part of the new Kingdom of Great Britain, but the clans' loyalties to a distant monarch were not strong. A considerable number of islesmen "came out" in support of the Jacobite Earl of Mar in the "15" and again in the 1745 rising including Macleod of Dunvegan and MacLea of Lismore. The aftermath of the decisive Battle of Culloden, which effectively ended Jacobite hopes of a Stuart restoration, was widely felt. The British government's strategy was to estrange the clan chiefs from their kinsmen and turn their descendants into English-speaking landlords whose main concern was the revenues their estates brought rather than the welfare of those who lived on them. This may have brought peace to the islands, but in the following century it came at a terrible price.

The early 19th century was a time of improvement and population growth. Roads and quays were built, the slate industry became a significant employer on Easdale and surrounding islands, and the construction of the Crinan and Caledonian canals and other engineering works such as Telford's "Bridge across the Atlantic" improved transport and access. However, in the mid-19th century, the inhabitants of many parts of the Hebrides were devastated by the clearances, which destroyed communities throughout the Highlands and Islands as the human populations were evicted and replaced with sheep farms. The position was exacerbated by the failure of the islands' kelp industry that thrived from the 18th century until the end of the Napoleonic Wars in 1815 and large scale emigration became endemic. The "Battle of the Braes" involved a demonstration against lack of access to land and the serving of eviction notices. This event was instrumental in the creation of the Napier Commission, which reported in 1884 on the situation in the Highlands. Disturbances continued until the passing of the 1886 Crofters' Act and on one occasion 400 marines were deployed on Skye to maintain order.

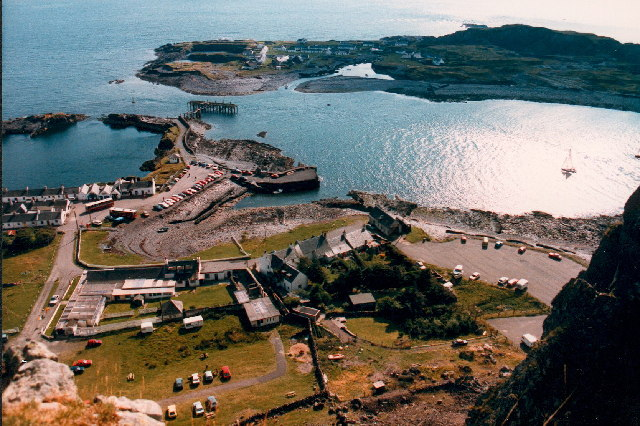
Sea filled slate quarries on Seil (foreground) and Easdale in the Slate Islands

For those who remained new economic opportunities emerged through the export of cattle, commercial fishing and tourism. Nonetheless, emigration and military service became the choice of many and the archipelago's populations continued to dwindle throughout the late 19th and 20th centuries. Jura's population fell from 1300 in 1831 to less than 250 by 1961 and Mull's from 10,600 in 1821 to less than 3,000 in 1931. Lengthy periods of continuous occupation notwithstanding, some of the smaller islands were abandoned – the Treshnish Isles in 1934, Handa in 1948, and Eilean Macaskin in the 1880s among them.

Nonetheless, there were continuing gradual economic improvements, among the most visible of which was the replacement of the traditional thatched blackhouse with accommodation of a more modern design and in recent years, with the assistance of Highlands and Islands Enterprise many of the island's populations have begun to increase after decades of decline.

== Transport ==
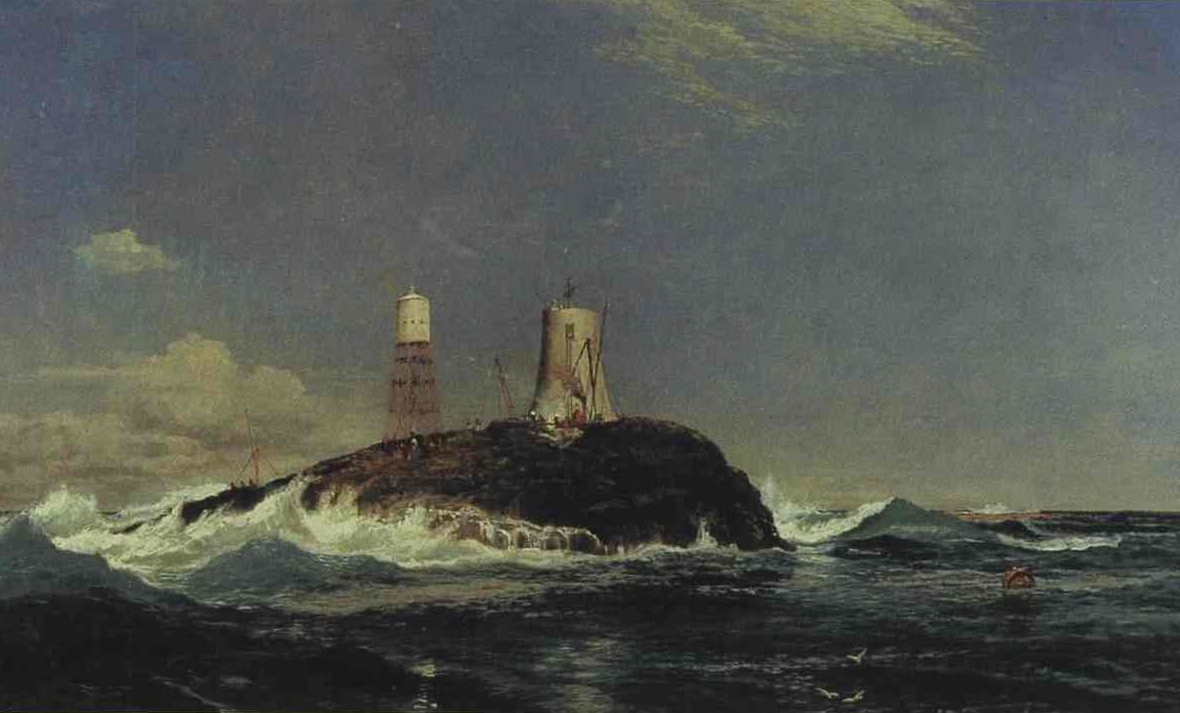
Dhu Heartach Lighthouse, During Construction by Sam Bough (1822–1878)

Scheduled ferry services between the Inner Hebrides and the Scottish mainland operate on various routes including: Tayinloan, Kintyre to Gigha; Kennacraig, Kintyre to Islay; Oban to Mull, Coll and Tiree and Colonsay; Mallaig to Armadale, Skye and Eigg, Muck, Rùm & Canna; and Glenelg to Kyle Rhea on the Sleat peninsula, Skye.

Some ferries reach the Inner Hebrides from other islands such as the Seil to Luing route, Fionnphort on the Ross of Mull to Iona, Sconser to Raasay and Port Askaig to Feolin, Jura. There is also a service to and from the Outer Hebrides from Tarbert, Harris and Lochmaddy on North Uist to Uig, Skye and from Castlebay, Barra to Tiree.

National Rail services are available for onward journeys, from stations at Oban, which has direct services to Glasgow and from Kyle of Lochalsh to Inverness. There are scheduled flights from Colonsay Airport, Islay Airport near Port Ellen and Tiree Airport.

The archipelago is exposed to wind and tide, and there are numerous sites of wrecked ships. Lighthouses are sited as an aid to navigation at various locations. Dubh Artach lighthouse is located on a remote rock and warns seafarers away from the area itself and the nearby Torran Rocks. Originally it was considered to be an impossible site for a light, but the loss of the steamer Bussorah with all thirty-three hands on her maiden voyage in 1863 and of an astonishing 24 vessels in the area in a storm on 30–31 December 1865 encouraged positive action. Skerryvore is another remote lighthouse in the vicinity and at a height of 48 metres (157 feet) it is the tallest in Scotland.

== Gaelic language ==
Geographic distribution of Gaelic speakers in Scotland (2011)

There are about 4,000 Gaelic speakers in the Inner Hebrides, equal to 20% of the population of the archipelago.

There have been speakers of Goidelic languages in the Inner Hebrides since the time of Columba or before, and the modern variant of Scottish Gaelic (Gàidhlig) remains strong in some parts. However, the Education (Scotland) Act 1872 led to generations of Gaels being forbidden to speak their native language in the classroom, and is now recognised as having dealt a major blow to the language. Children were being beaten for speaking Gaelic in school as late as the 1930s. More recently the Gaelic Language (Scotland) Act was enacted by the Scottish Parliament in 2005 in order to provide continuing support for the language.

By the time of the 2001 census Kilmuir parish in Skye had 47% Gaelic speakers, with Skye overall having an unevenly distributed 31%. At that time Tiree had 48% of the population Gaelic-speaking, Lismore 29%, Islay 24%, Coll 12%, Jura 11%, Mull 13% and Iona 5%. Students of Scottish Gaelic travel from all over the world to attend Sabhal Mòr Ostaig, a Scottish Gaelic college based on Skye.

== The arts ==
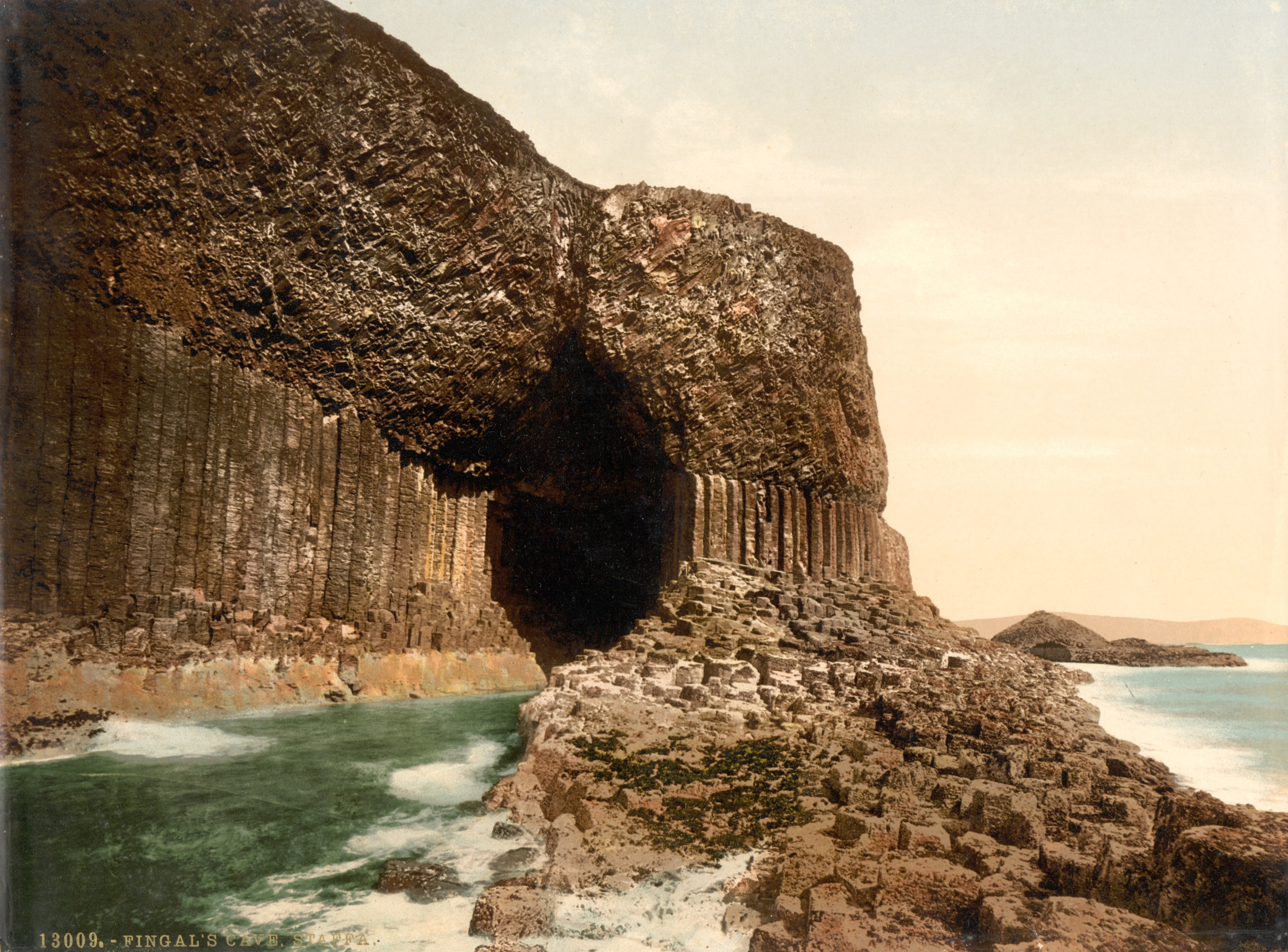
Entrance to Fingal's Cave, Staffa

Hebridean landscapes have inspired a variety of musicians, writers and artists. The Hebrides, also known as Fingal's Cave, is a famous overture written by Felix Mendelssohn inspired by his visit to Staffa. Marie Dare's Hebridean Suite for cello and piano was composed in 1947. Contemporary musicians associated with the islands include Ian Anderson, Donovan, Chris Rainbow and Runrig. Enya's song "Ebudæ" from Shepherd Moons is based on a traditional waulking song.

The poet Sorley MacLean was born on Raasay, the setting for his best known poem, Hallaig. George Orwell wrote much of the novel 1984 whilst living at Barnhill on Jura and J. M. Barrie wrote a screenplay for the 1924 film adaptation of Peter Pan whilst on Eilean Shona. Cressida Cowell, the author of How to Train Your Dragon, spent childhood summers in the Inner Hebrides and has stated that they are "one of the most beautiful places on Earth" and "the kind of place where you expect to see dragons overhead".

== Wildlife ==
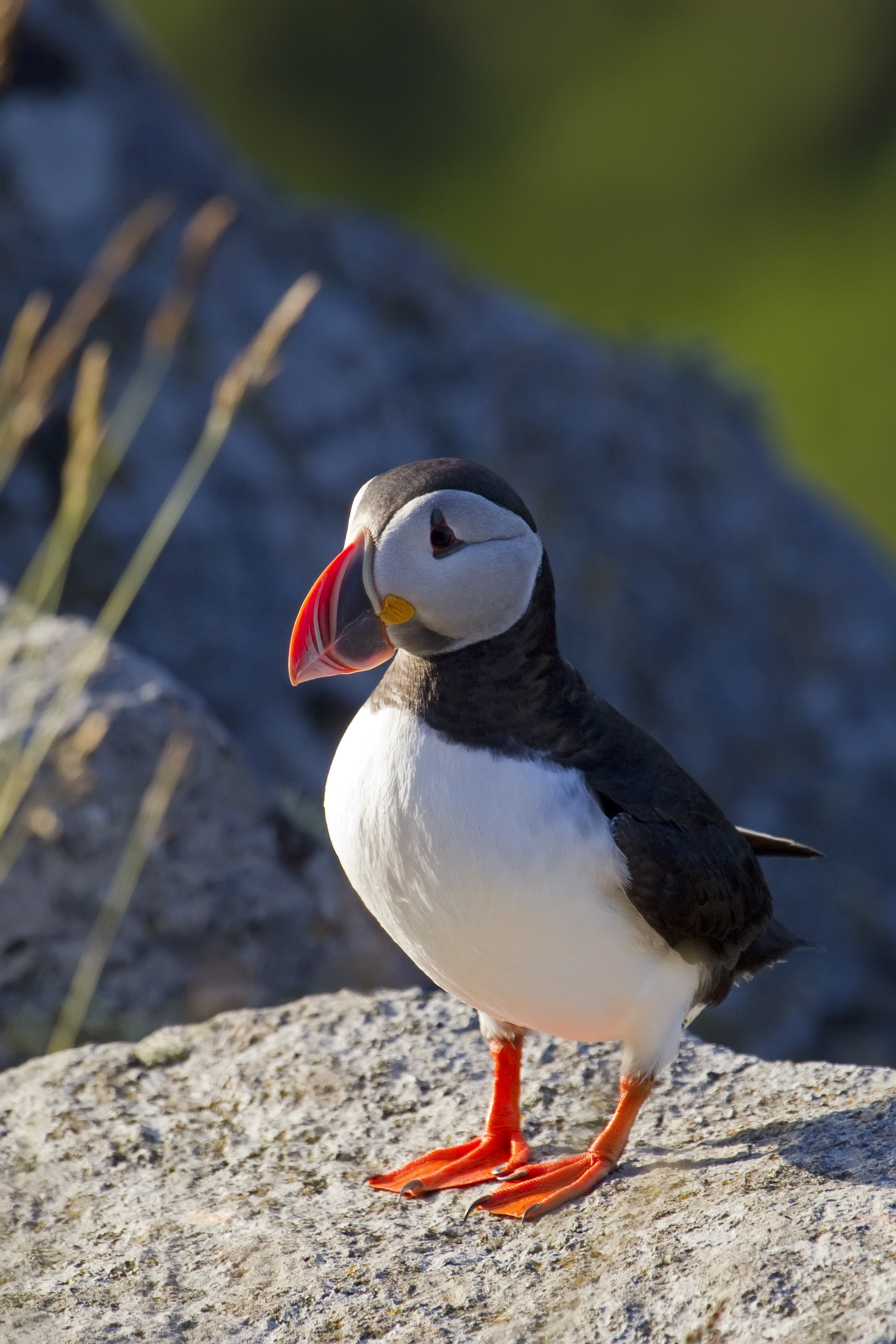
Adult Atlantic puffin (Fratercula arctica) in breeding plumage on Lunga in the Treshnish Isles.

In some respects the Hebrides generally lack biodiversity in comparison to mainland Britain, with for example only half the number of mammalian species the latter has. However, these islands have much to offer the naturalist. Observing the local abundance found on Skye in the 18th century Samuel Johnson noted that:

At the tables where a stranger is received, neither plenty nor delicacy is wanting. A tract of land so thinly inhabited, must have much wild-fowl; and I scarcely remember to have seen a dinner without them. The moor-game is every where to be had. That the sea abounds with fish, needs not be told, for it supplies a great part of Europe. The Isle of Sky has stags and roebucks, but no hares. They sell very numerous droves of oxen yearly to England, and therefore cannot be supposed to want beef at home. Sheep and goats are in great numbers, and they have the common domestic fowls."

—

In the modern era avian life includes the corncrake, red-throated diver, rock dove, kittiwake, tystie, Atlantic puffin, goldeneye, golden eagle and white-tailed sea eagle. The last named was re-introduced to Rùm in 1975 and has successfully spread to various neighbouring islands, including Mull. There is a small population of red-billed chough concentrated on the islands of Islay and Colonsay.

Mountain hare (apparently absent from Skye in the 18th century) and European rabbit are now abundant and predated on by Scottish wildcat and pine marten. Scottish red deer are common on the hills and the grey seal and harbour seal are present around the coasts of Scotland in internationally important numbers, with colonies of the former found on Oronsay and the Treshnish Isles and the latter most abundant in the Firth of Lorn. The rich fresh water streams contain brown trout, Atlantic salmon and water shrew. Offshore minke whales, killer whales, basking sharks, porpoises and dolphins are among the sea life that can be seen and edible crab and oyster are also found, in for example, the Sound of Scalpay. There are nationally important horse mussel and brittlestar beds in the sea lochs.

Heather moor containing ling, bell heather, cross-leaved heath, bog myrtle and fescues is abundant and there is a diversity of arctic and alpine plants including alpine pearlwort and mossy cyphal.

== See also ==
- Rulers of the Kingdom of the Isles
