= Trumpan =

Coordinates: 57.554531°N 6.640927°W

Trumpan: Scottish Gaelic: Trumpan
- Location within the Isle of Skye
- OS grid reference: NG225611
- Council area: Highland
- Country: Scotland
- Sovereign state: United Kingdom
- Post town: Hallin
- Postcode district: IV55 8
- Police: Scotland
- Fire: Scottish
- Ambulance: Scottish

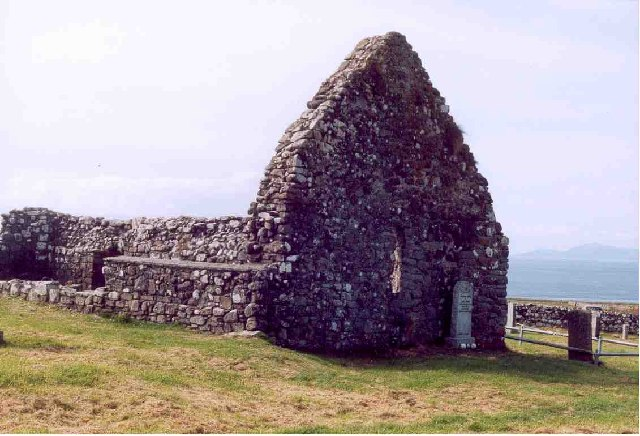
The ruins of Trumpan church

Trumpan (Scottish Gaelic: Trumpan) is a hamlet located on the Vaternish peninsula in the Isle of Skye, in the Scottish council area of the Highland. Trumpan Church, which is now a ruin, was the focus of a particularly brutal incident in 1578, when the Clan MacDonald of Uist travelled to Trumpan in eight boats and, under cover of a thick mist, burnt alive all the worshipping church-goers, with only one member managing to escape. This led to instant retribution by Clan MacLeod, who killed all the invaders before they had time to flee the island. This skirmish is known as the Battle of the Spoiling Dyke.

Trumpan churchyard is the burial ground of Rachel Chiesley, Lady Grange, whose husband had her kidnapped and incarcerated on various Hebridean islands.
