= Cleit =

Stone construction, typically found on St Kilda, Scotland

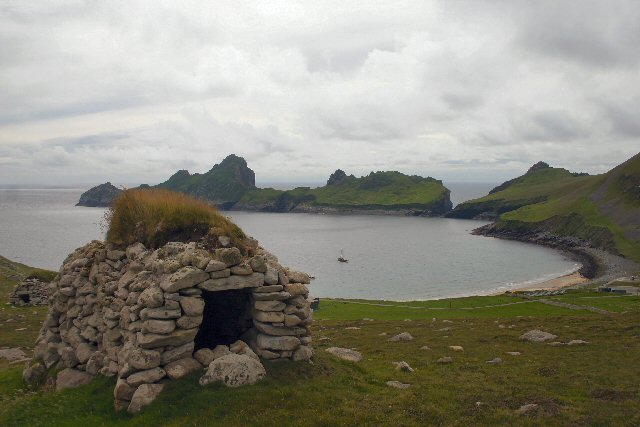
A cleit on St Kilda (overlooking Village Bay)

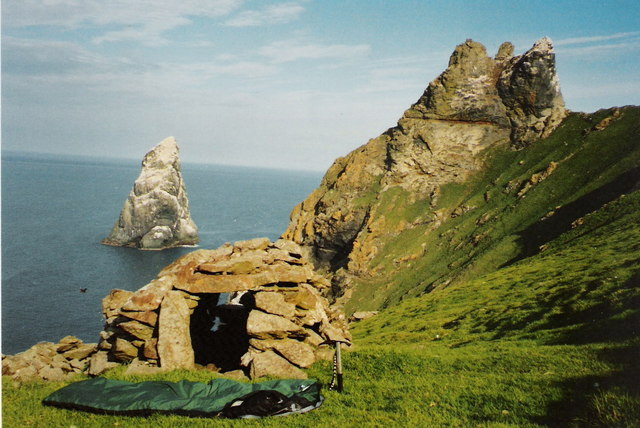
A cleit at the Cleitein McPhaidein, Boreray

A cleit is a stone storage hut or bothy, uniquely found on the isles and stacks of St Kilda; whilst many are still to be found, they are slowly falling into disrepair. There are known to be 1,260 cleitean on Hirta and a further 170 on the other St Kilda-group islands.

The outlying island of Boreray has the Cleitean MacPhàidein, a "cleit village" of three small bothies, which were used on a regular basis during fowling expeditions from Hirta. As a result of a smallpox outbreak on Hirta in 1727, three men and eight boys were marooned on Stac an Armin, near to Boreray, until the following May.

On St Kilda, which is treeless, the islanders used the wind passing through the cleits to preserve some of their food instead of using salt or smoking. The Cleitean were used to dry and to store a wide variety of foodstuffs. These included:

- cured fish
- bird eggs (The eggs were collected from the spring-time nests of Guillemot, Razorbill, and Fulmar birds by St Kilda men scaling the cliffs. The eggs were buried in St Kilda peat ash.)
- feathers
- fishing gear
- grains such as wheat, barley and oats
- hay
- lamb
- manure
- peat
- potatoes
- ropes
- seabird carcasses

"The wind beats down upon the walls, lifting the thatch, prefiguring a storm. Crabs, fieldmice, Horniegolachs, creeping and crawling things seek shelter in the cleits, abandoned cottages and kirk."

— Norman Bissett, Leaving St Kilda, 1999

== Construction ==
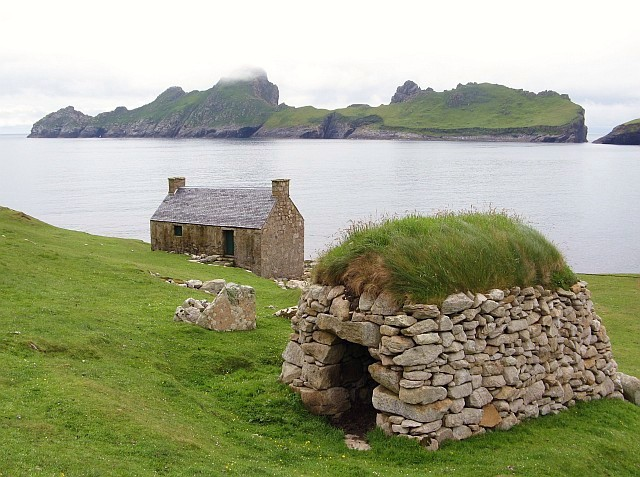
Cleit on Hirta

Typically the cleitean are found on hilly ground and therefore are typically laid out along the direction of the slope, with their front ends looking uphill and their rounded rear ends looking downhill. On St Kilda, the drystone walls are distinctive for their lack of coursing and seemingly random stone placement - this was deliberate, to ensure that the wind could pass through and thus help to preserve food stores kept there. Occasionally the entrance is found in a side wall. Examples also exist of cleitean built perpendicularly to the direction of the slope, with the entrance in one of the narrower ends.

In order to be able to withstand any downward thrust, the end facing downhill is normally built in the shape of an apse with a strong support. Entrances are very rarely placed in the apsidal end, in order not to compromise its strength.

In his book on St Kilda, David Quine says of the cleitean, "They come in many shapes and sizes, but all have dry stone walls to allow the wind to whistle through, and great stone slabs for roofs, capped with turf to absorb the water."

== In history ==
Whilst she was kidnapped by her husband James Erskine, Lord Grange in the 1730s, Rachel Chiesley, Lady Grange was forced for some time to live in a cleit at Hirta, on St Kilda. The cleit in the Village meadows is said to resemble "a giant Christmas pudding". Some authorities believe that it was rebuilt on the site of a larger blackhouse where she also lived during her incarceration. In 1838, the grandson of a St Kildan who had assisted her quoted the dimensions as being 20 ft × 10 ft (6 m × 3 m), which is a common size for a cleit.

== Gallery ==
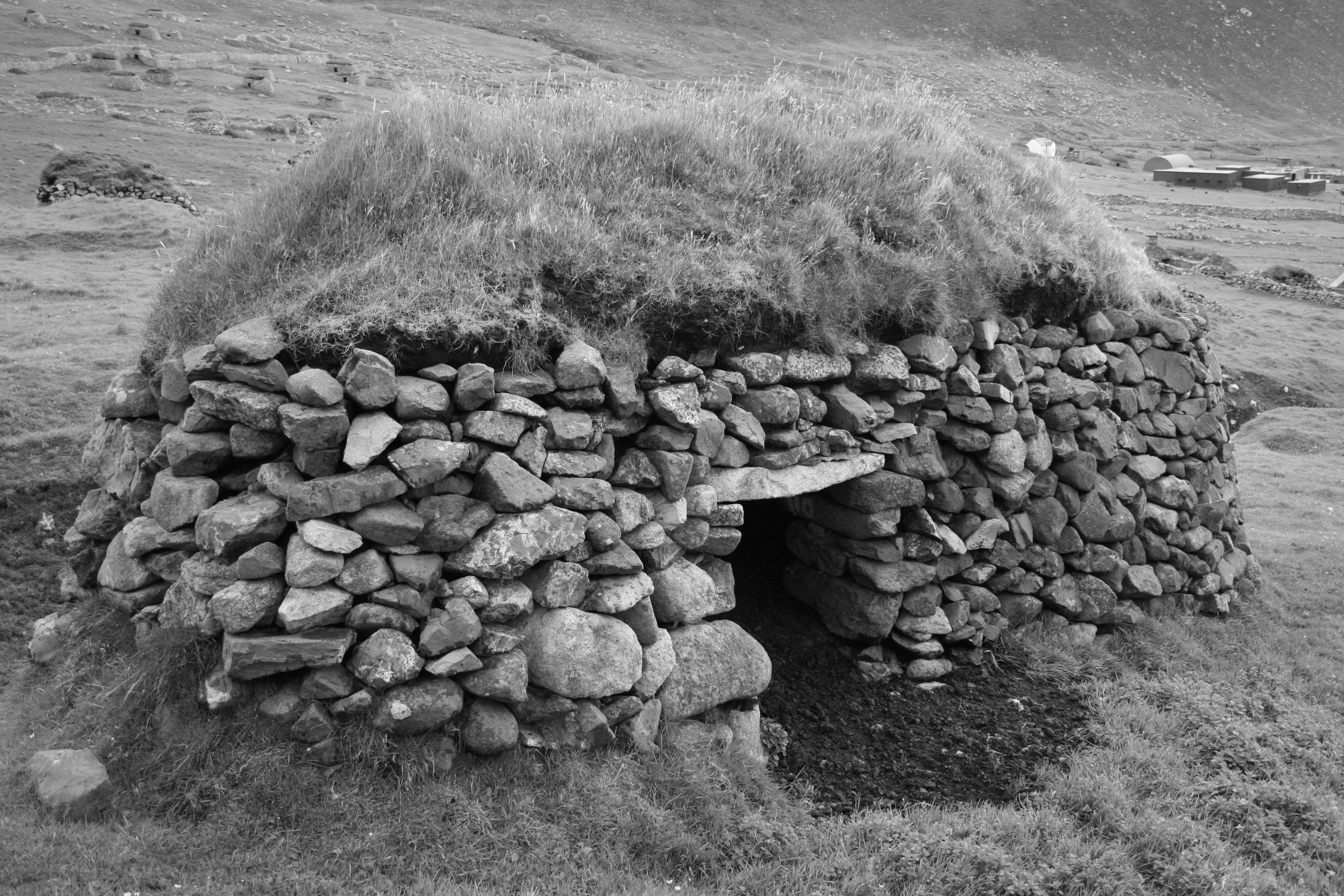
A cleit on Hirta

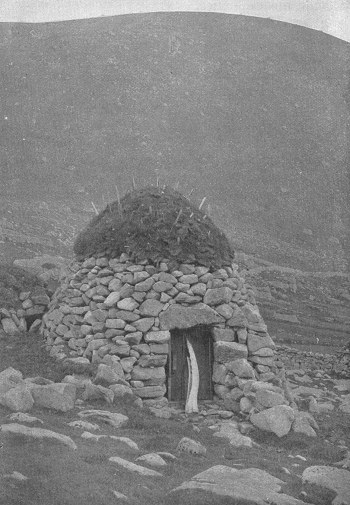
A cleit in 1898

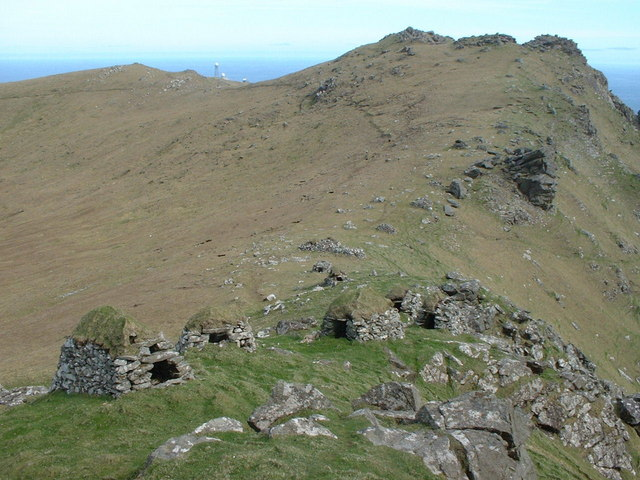
Cleits seen from Mullach Bi

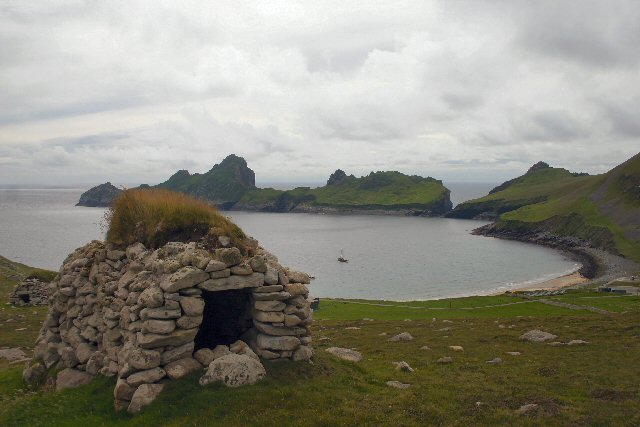
Cleit overlooking the harbour
