= Trumpan Church =

Ruined church and burial ground in Trumpan, Scotland

Coordinates: 57.55564°N 6.64057°W

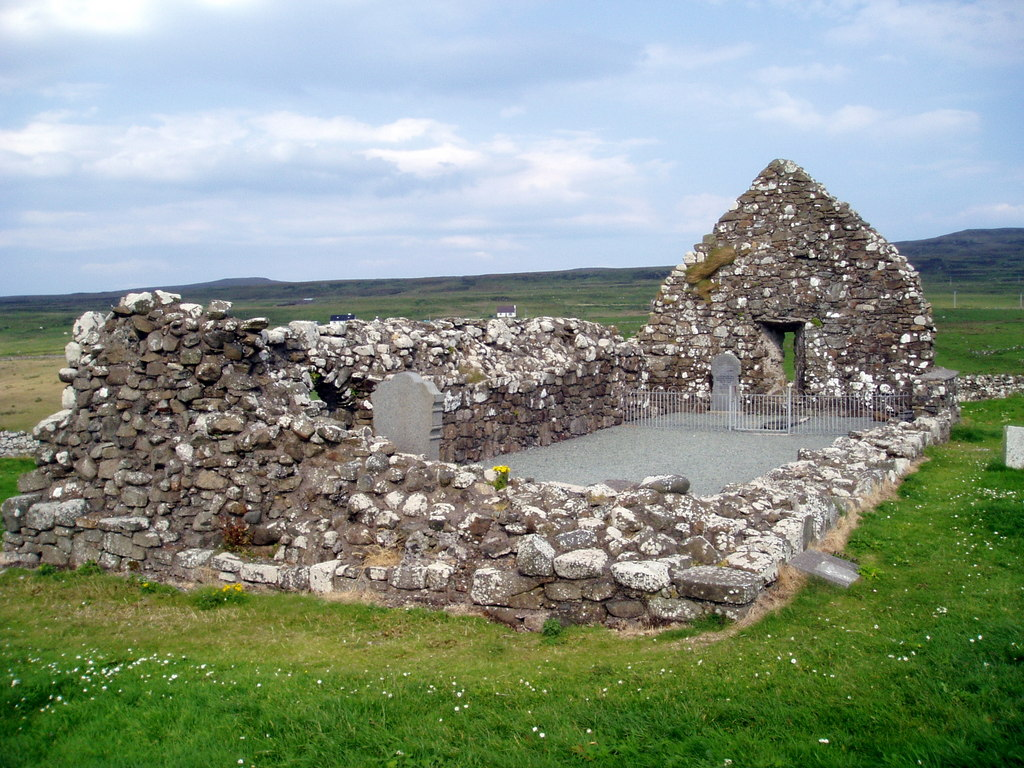
Trumpan church, Skye

Trumpan Church is a ruined medieval church located on the Isle of Skye in Scotland. In 1578, the church was the site of a brutal massacre of the Clan MacLeod by Clan Macdonald, (also known as Clan Ranald) of South Uist. The attack was in retaliation for the massacre of hundreds of members of Clan Macdonald on the island of Eigg the previous year. The church and surrounding graveyard contain late medieval carved gravestones. Historic Environment Scotland designated the church and surrounding burial ground a scheduled monument in 1936.

== Description ==
The 13th century ruined village church is situated in Trumpan, on the northern end of the Waternish peninsula on the Isle of Skye. Also known as "Cille Conain", the building was in use until the 16th century.

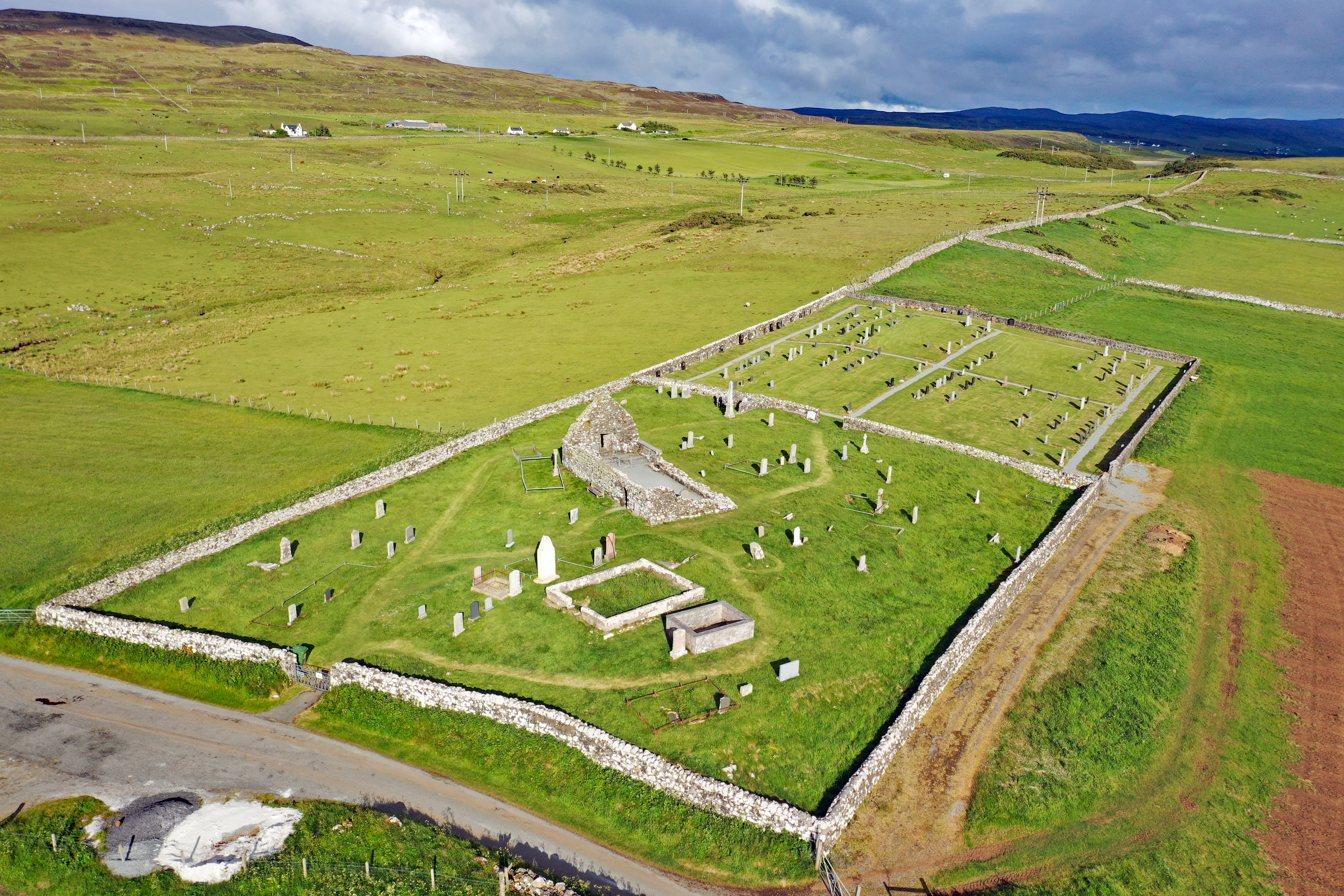
Aerial view of Trumpan churchyard

The layout of the church is rectangular, measuring 15.2 m (50 ft) by 7 m (23 ft) wide. The structure's north wall, arched doorway and east gable have survived undamaged. The north wall is 2.75 m (9 ft 0 in) in height, while little remains of the south wall. Inside the church are late medieval gravestones and the remnants of a stone basin that is believed to be the holy water font. One of the graves is inscribed with a claymore (sword) surrounded by animals and foliage.

The burial ground surrounding the church contains a rough standing stone, 1.3 m (4 ft 3 in) in height, and known as the "Priest's Stone". A second medieval grave slab, southwest of the church, is engraved with the image of a tonsured priest with the placement of the hands as if in prayer. In the upper part of the stone, is an interlaced cross within a circle, and in the lower part of the stone is the image of a chalice.

The church and surrounding burial ground were designated a scheduled monument in 1936.

== History ==
Trumpan church dates from the medieval era, possibly the 13th century. It is believed to have been dedicated to St Connan. It is the site of the mid-16th century massacre of Clan Macleod by Clan Macdonald of South Uist. The Macdonald party landed on the island on a Sunday morning in May, 1578 and set fire to the church with the congregation inside, blocking the doors to prevent people from escaping. The massacre was in retaliation for the slaughter of over 350 members of Clan Macdonald on the island of Eigg the previous year

A battle ensued when MacLeod clan members from Dunvegan rushed to the scene and attacked the murderers as they sought to leave the island and were stopped by a receding tide. Very few of the Macdonald clan survived the battle. The victims were buried near a dyke which was pulled down over the corpses, giving the name to the battle as the "Battle of the Spoiling Dyke". The church and village were abandoned after the massacre.

The church's burial ground is also thought to be where Lady Grange, a famous 18th century kidnap victim, is buried.

== See also ==
- St Magnus Church, Egilsay
- Massacre of Monzievaird
