= Idrigill =

Coordinates: 57.5909°N 6.37693°W

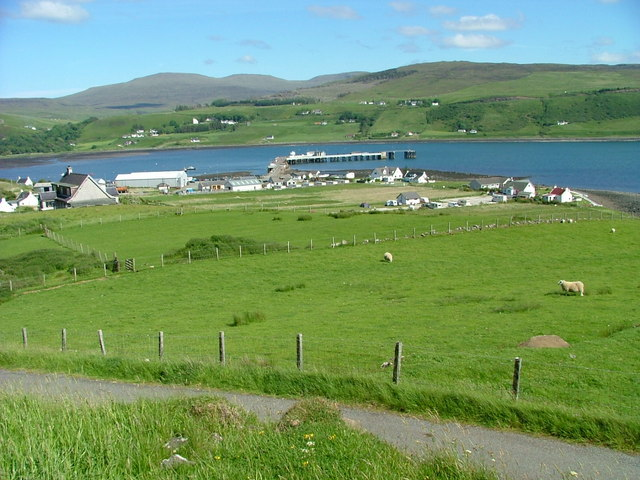
- Crofting at Idrigill.

- Location within the Isle of Skye
- OS grid reference: NG385637
- Council area: Highland
- Country: Scotland
- Sovereign state: United Kingdom
- Postcode district: IV51 9
- Dialling code: 01470
- Police: Scotland
- Fire: Scottish
- Ambulance: Scottish
- UK Parliament: Inverness, Skye and West Ross-shire
- Scottish Parliament: Skye, Lochaber and Badenoch

Idrigill is a small crofting village, on the coast of Uig Bay, on the west side of the Trotternish Peninsula, near Uig, in Portree, Isle of Skye, Scottish Highlands and is in the Scottish council area of Highland.
