= Battle of the Spoiling Dyke =

Scottish clan battle of 1578, fought between the MacDonalds of Uist and Clan MacLeod

Coordinates: 57.29°N 6.22°W

- Part of the Scottish clan wars
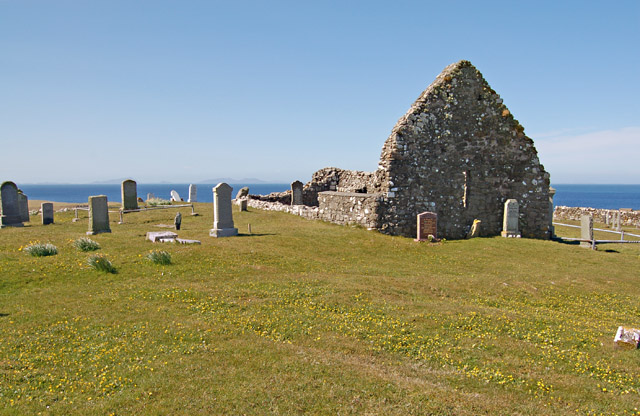
- The ruins of Trumpan Church
Date	1578
Location	Trumpan Church, Ardmore Bay, Scotland
Result	MacLeod victory

Belligerents
Clan MacDonald of Sleat	Clan MacLeod

Strength
Unknown	Unknown

Casualties and losses
Almost all	Unknown

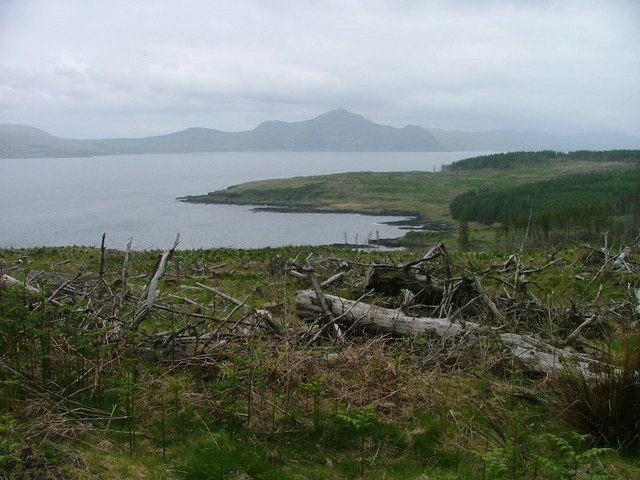
Ardmore Bay

The Battle of the Spoiling Dyke or Battle of the Spoiled Dyke (Scottish Gaelic: Blar Milleadh a’ Ghàraidh, Millegearaidh) was a Scottish clan battle that took place in 1578 on the island of Skye between the MacDonalds of Uist and Clan MacLeod.

The MacDonalds of Uist barred the doors of Trumpan Church, or Kilconan Church as it was once known, east of the shores of Ardmore Bay. They then set fire to the church full of worshipers. No one escaped alive except one girl who, although mortally wounded, managed to give the alarm. On hearing the news, the chief of Clan MacLeod and his men set off for Ardmore bay where a battle ensued. The MacDonalds were killed almost to a man. The corpses of the MacDonalds were dragged and then buried in a turf dyke, and the incident remembered as the "Battle of the Spoiling Dyke". The atrocity by the MacDonalds was to exact vengeance on the MacLeods for their atrocity of the massacre of MacDonalds in the Cave of Frances on the Isle of Eigg a couple of years earlier. This again was a tit-for-tat revenge between the two feuding clans.

== See also ==
- Battle of the Braes
- Glendale
