= The Biggest Little Railway in the World =

Temporary long distance model railway

- Fort William to Inverness

Overview
- Status: Closed
- Locale: Scottish Highlands
- Termini: Corpach; Inverness Castle
- Stations: 2

Service
- Rolling stock: Gas-Steam, Battery-Electric, Wooden

History
- Commenced: 20 June 2017
- Planned opening: 23 June 2017
- Opened: 23 June 2017
- Completed: 1 July 2017
- Closed: 1 July 2017

Technical
- Line length: 71 mi (114 km)
- Track length: 74 mi (119 km)
- Number of tracks: 1
- Character: Model railway
- Rack system: Rack and pinion
- Track gauge: O—Gauge 32 mm (1.26 in)
- Operating speed: 3 mph (4.8 km/h)
- Signalling: Vocal

The Biggest Little Railway in the World (BLR) was a temporary 71 mile (114 km) 1.25 inches (32 mm) O-gauge model railway from Fort William to the City of Inverness, the two largest settlements in the Scottish Highlands, in 2017. It has been described as a crackpot project to run a model train the length of the Great Glen Way by an army of madcap enthusiasts, geeks, and engineers in the best spirit of eccentric Britishness.

== Project ==
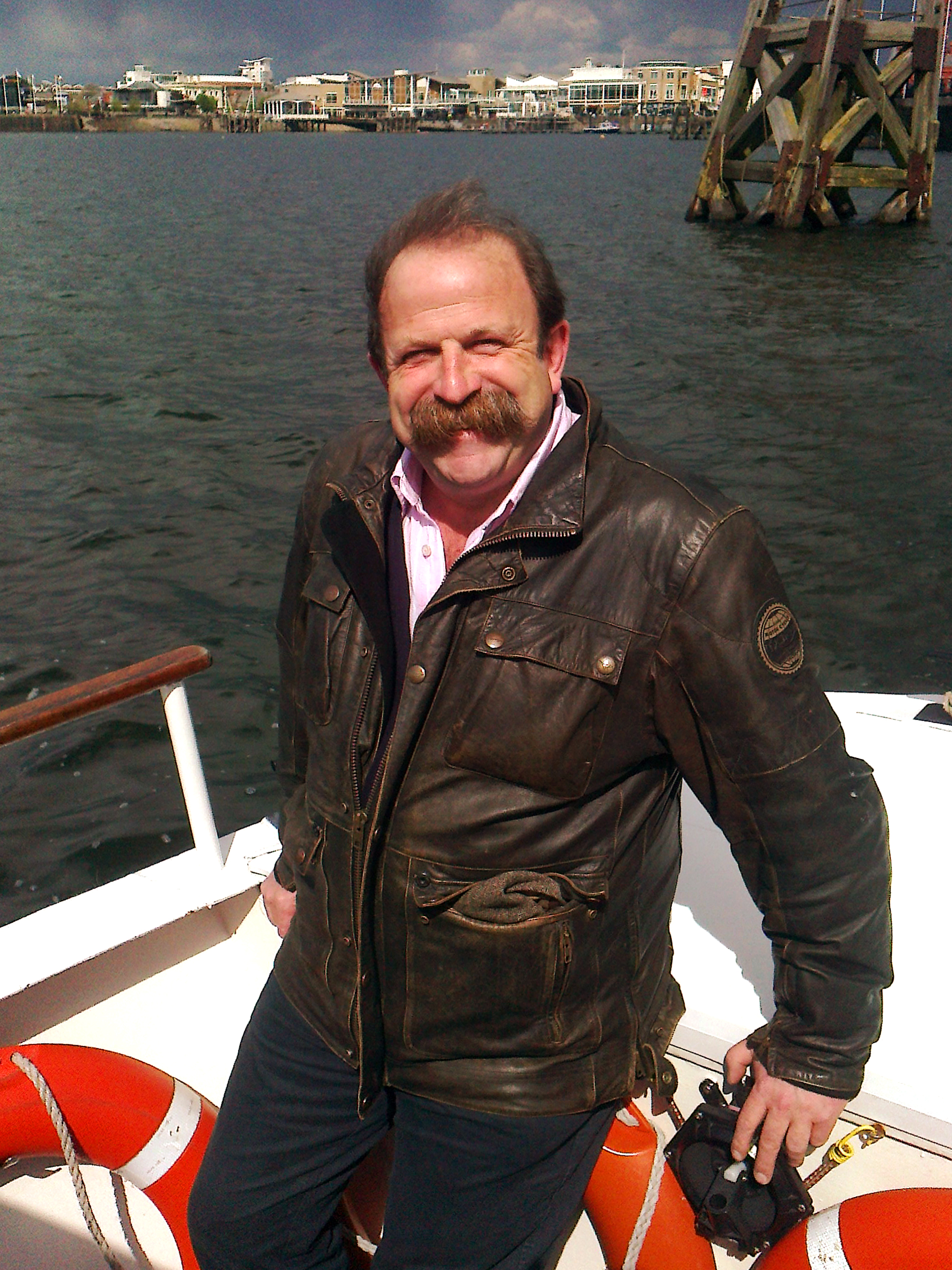
Dick Strawbridge, MBE, founder

The project was headed by Dick Strawbridge, MBE. It was backed by a television production with the same name as the railway. The production team and security staff were also needed to assist with the project.

=== Project management ===
The project took months of planning. It was described as an operation of fiendish complexity. Calls were made for the 56 volunteers determined to be needed for the project. There were planning meetings at the start of each day. Some disagreements occurred but were overcome by a spirit of gusto and camaraderie.

=== Team ===
Engineers Claire Barratt and Hadrian Spooner who had worked on engineering projects such as Scrapheap Challenge and Salvage Squad also acted as part of the credited professional team.

A team of 56 volunteers constructed and operated the line with help from local volunteers.

=== Community involvement ===
The local community also assisted the enterprise at various points including the Inverness and District Model Railway Club provisioning a model station and castle for the train's arrival.

=== Related projects ===
The Invergarry and Fort Augustus Railway, opened in 1903 and closed in 1946, had connected to the main line at Spean Bridge. It was speculated the ultimate aim was the same as the BLR's, to reach Inverness though the attempt was abandoned. In 2009 James May attempted to beat the longest OO Gauge record.

== Route ==
The route began at Corpach Double Lock near Fort William and tracked the Great Glen Way past Fort Augustus to Inverness terminating at Inverness Castle. The track and infrastructure have been lifted and little evidence remains of the line.

On leaving Corpach Double Lock the track followed the south bank of the Caledonian canal for about a mile to a ferry pontoon at Banavie. A ferry crossing was required under road and railway bridges to the first lock of the Neptune Staircase. The route continued on the south bank of the canal to Gairlochy before crossing to the north bank. Following the north shore of Loch Lochy through some winding and challenging terrain and forest the line finally reached some good ground before just prior to the River Arkaig. Following nearly ten miles of good fast track the line crossed to the south bank at Laggan Locks over a truss bridge. The line joined the path of the Invergarry and Fort Augustus Railway through the Loch Oich tunnel and along the shoreline to cross the Calendonian Canal at the Aberchalder Swing Bridge. Five miles of fast straight track to Fort Augustus ensued including crossing the spectacular Aberchalder Spillway Viaduct. After Fort Augustus the line entered hilly and mountainous terrain. The Inchnacardon Canyon trestle bridge lead to Inch Mountain which the train ascended by means of a counterbalance railway system. Tracking the north west side of Loch Ness before rounding the Sron na Muic (snout of the pig) mountain the line descended down into Invermoriston. The zig-zag on Invermoriston Mountain was overcome by railway winch systems before further running alongside Loch Ness before descending down into Drumnadrochit. The original rack and pinion system used to ascend Creag Nay was discarded and the trains had to be assisted by means of temporary winches. Ten further miles mostly along Loch Ness brought the line close to Mac Gruer's Pond where the City of Inverness first came into view. The line descended past the Asylum, across to the helix spiral to which raised it up to the canal towpath. The line finally passed through Ness Islands before the final mile to the Terminus at Inverness Castle.

== Engineering ==
The BLR had to overcome obstacles of canals, fields, paths, lochs, drops, mountains, hills and obstacles.

=== Major challenges ===
==== Track ====
Finding suitable track. Conventional track cost about £7 per metre making the 70 miles unfeasible from a cost viewpoint alone. Without a viable track solution the project would have been a nonstarter. A suggestion to extrude the track meant 32 tonnes of recycled PVC could be pushed through dies for 40,000 straights and curves which solved the problem economically and effectively and enabled the scheme to pass beyond the idea stage

==== Banavie Bridges ====
The BLR overcame the obstacles of main line railway swing bridge followed by a road crossing at Banavie by construction and operation of a derrick and train ferry to assist over a water hiatus.

==== Laggan Locks canal crossing ====
The railway needed to cross the canal at Laggan 57.033°N 4.813°W. The A82 road at this point uses a swing bridge and it was determined The Biggest Little Railway in the World would not use this. The solution was to use a truss bridge. The bridge was later re-used at the Caledonian Helix.

==== Aberchalder Spillway ====
Crossing the Aberchalder Spillway 57.095366°N 4.741556°W, which was bridged with a 60 metres (200 ft) viaduct. The team are outraged when Dick Strawbridge insists the Battery Electric Little John relief locomotive is used for the iconic crossing.

The feature was initially variously termed a ford or a weir by the project whereas spillway seems correct, the weir being further to the southwest.

==== Inchnacardoch Canyon ====
The railway faced the difficulty of bridging a gap over Inchnacardoch Canyon 57°09′14″N 4°41′03″W just north of Fort Augustus. The Great Glen Way used a footpath unviable for the railway around this feature. A suspension bridge was not an option as a curve was needed between the entry and exit points. Uneven ground contours increased the challenge. The solution chosen was a trestle bridge. The trackbed was secured to a series of connected bespoke a-frames giving great strength while using a minimal quantity of wood. The entrance and exit points were on a different levels with a smooth gradient required throughout. The construction team used Archimedes' principle and a long clear tube filled with fluid to establish a datum height across any two points on the site so a consistent gradient could be calculated. When the build was underway it was discovered the exit would require a curve of too tight a radius for a train to circumnavigate. The solution was to extend the bridge further to a different point where a suitable curve could be achieved on exit. The resulting structure was a 905 inches (23.0 m) reverse curved wooden swerving trestle bridge which proved even able to support a 65 kilograms (143 lb) man. Silver Lady negotiated the Bridge successfully with careful driving by Andy though the lack of a parapet could have proved disastrous in the event of a derailment.

==== Inch Mountain ====
Inch mountain is the BLR name for the Great Glen Way's ascent to height in Inchnacardoch forest. 57°09′14″N 4°41′03″W The incline exceeds even the 17% maximum gradient of Silver Lady. As the route could be divided into a small number of relatively straight sections a counterbalance railway solution was chosen. This is a form of cable railway with a train of near equal weight descending on a parallel track attached by a cable through a pulley at the top of the climb. In this implementation a sister locomotive Silver Lady II was used as counterweight and the locomotives achieved sufficient adhesion to bring Silver Lady up the inclines.

==== Invermoriston Mountain ====
The challenge on Invermoriston Mountain 57°13′03″N 4°36′24″W was to overcome a series of zig-zag gradients. The solution chosen was to construct a hand cranked winch that could be attached to the locomotive via a cable. The navvies found an efficient method of track construction at this site by getting quad bikes to drop bundles of track at the top of a slope allowing the navvy to simply join lengths of track at the top in a sitting position and gravity feed the track down the slope. In practice the winch system proved to be very effective.

==== Creag Nay ====
The ascent of Creag Nay 57°22′N 4°25′W presented issues of curling tracks, poor terrain and steep ascents. It was decided a rack and pinion system would be most effective. Flexible cogged belt was stuck on a wooden baton which was glued to the centre of a track. This engaged with a cog wheel fitted on the axle of the Silver Lady. The navvies completed the construction successfully, albeit the wet climatic conditions interfering with the adhesive. Testing with a supplied gear wheel proved successful but unfortunately there was no testing with a real locomotive before the first train came to pass. When tried operationally it was found that while successfully causing the locomotive to climb the gradient the centre tooth belt was set too high meaning the locomotive was not properly resting on both rails and having an extreme propensity to toppling over. The belt was therefore ripped out and an improvised winch system based on an electric drill used to assist the locomotive up the slope.

==== Caledonian Helix ====
At the point the Great Glen Way rejoins the Caledonian Canal on the outskirts of Inverness there was 5 metres (16 ft) near vertical climb in a restricted space. This was solved by a spiral loop solution matching Silver Lady's 2 ft minimum curve radius and restricting to an 8% maximum gradient. The solution also re-used the truss bridge from the Laggan Locks canal crossing.

== Rolling stock ==
(All Locomotives built and supplied by Roundhouse Engineering Co Ltd)

=== Silver Lady Class ===
Silver Lady
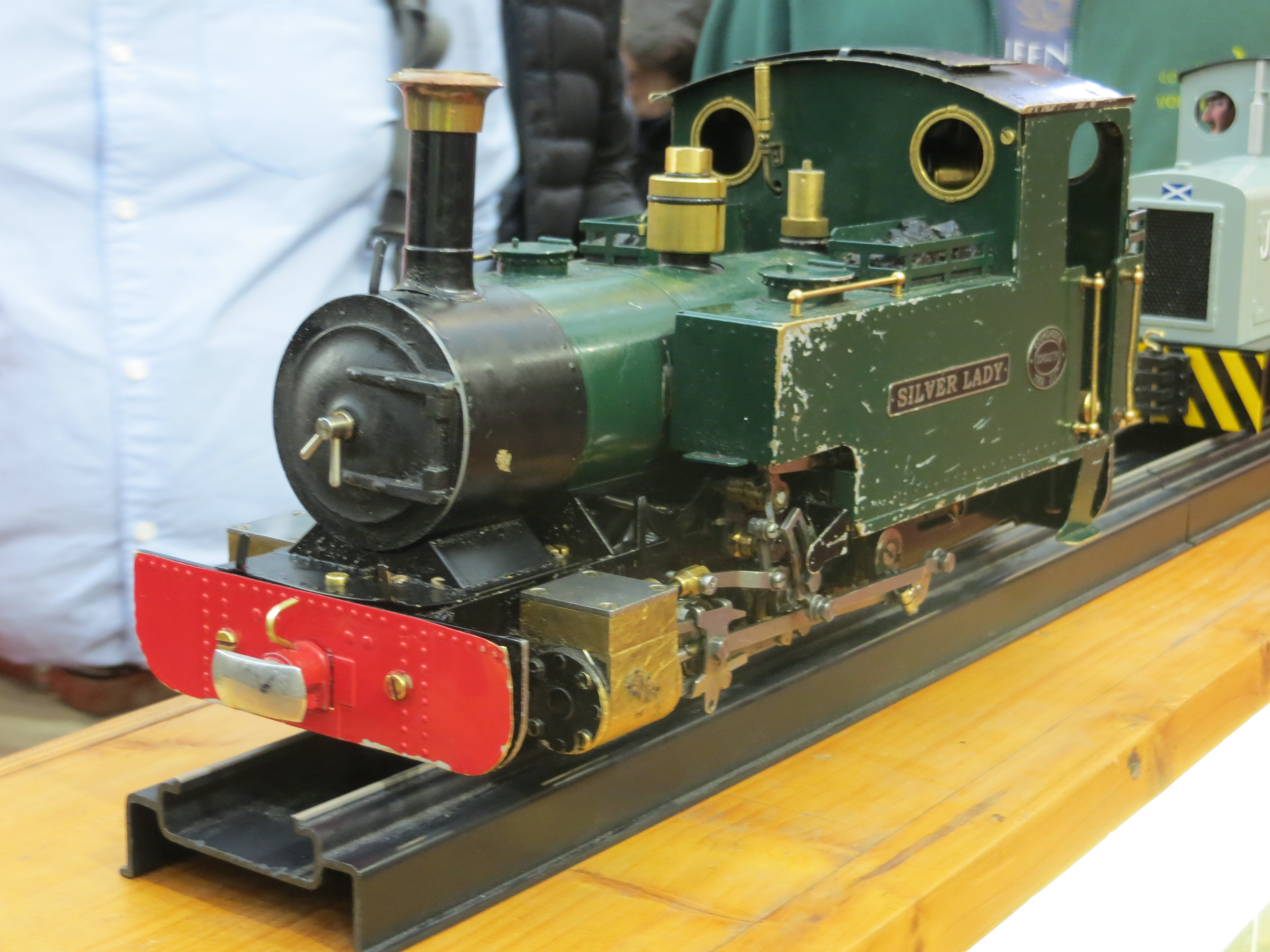
- Silver Lady
Type and origin
- Power type: Steam
- Builder: Roundhouse Engineering Co Ltd, Doncaster.
Specifications
- Configuration
  - Whyte: 0-6-0T
- Gauge: 32 mm (1.26 in); 45 mm (1.772 in) convertible
- Minimum curve: 2 feet (0.61 m)
- Length
  - Over beams: 315 millimetres (12.4 in)
- Width: 125 millimetres (4.9 in)
- Height: 160 millimetres (6.3 in)
- Loco weight: 3.3 kilograms (7.3 lb)
- Fuel type: Gas
- Boiler pressure: 40 psi
- Valve gear: Walschaerts (simplified)
Performance figures
- Maximum speed: 3 miles per hour (4.8 km/h)+
Career
- Operators: BLR
- Preserved: 1

Additional Specifications
- Suspension: fullysprung
- Control: R/C
- Max. forward gradient: 12%
- Max. curve gradient: 8%
- Max. reverse gradient: 17%

The Silver Lady Class locomotive was a development of the Lady Anne Class but featuring a sprung chassis, water top up system and other detail refinements.

==== Silver Lady ====
Silver Lady completed the run from Fort William to Inverness whilst being relieved by Little John for a couple of sections.

==== Silver Lady II ====
An additional Silver Lady class locomotive was used in support. It was fitted with patterned wheels needed for extreme climbing performance. As well as use on the counterbalance climb it was used as the relief locomotive on hill climbing sections and where urgent repairs were needed to the main locomotive.

=== Lady Anne Class ===
The Lady Anne Class was a classic design and the precursor to the Silver Lady Class.

==== Lady Anne ====
The Lady Anne was used for driver training and evaluation at the main depot. It also participated in evaluating prototype design testing for the Caledonian Helix and stood in for Silver Lady on a photoshoot of the Aberchalder Viaduct.

=== Little John Class ===
The Little John Class is a 0-4-0 battery-electric locomotive modeled on a diesel shunter.

==== Little John ====
Little John was the yellow class leader that substituted for Silver Lady while she was undergoing service or when steam support engineers were not available on the longer overnight catch-up runs. Little John was also involved in Special ops support operations such as filming from a locomotive driver's eyeline.

==== James ====
This grey Little John class locomotive was used to test the Inchnacardoch Canyon trellis.

=== Coaching Stock ===
Wooden styled coaching stock operated near Fort William only. At least one coach was built by volunteer Paul. The coaches were susceptible to blowing over in the wind, throwing the whole train onto its side. Additional ballast weights placed under one coach may have contributed to the axle dislocation and the coach becoming unserviceable.

== Operations ==
Support staff, needed to keep the project going and the train operational, meant the total number of people involved, excluding local community volunteers, was approximately 171.

=== Tracklaying ===
The tracklaying teams were challenged to try to lay an average of 5 miles (8.0 km) of track each day.

=== Train operations ===
The original scheme was to share locomotive driving amongst the volunteers, however as Silver Lady began to fall critically behind schedule it was deemed necessary to predominately use a top-link team composed of live-steam experienced people who could operate the locomotive smoothly and efficiently. This included Andy, a professional train driver, model rail hobbyist and volunteer driver on the Severn Valley Railway, and Cameron, engineering ambassador alumnus of St Helens College, miniature steam train driver, and founder of his own heritage engineering restoration business at age 17.

== Train schedule ==
Only one journey was ever made on The Biggest Little Railway in the World, and while the train experienced delays en-route the final arrival at Inverness Castle was approximately on time.

Schedule for the 23 June 2017 12:00 Fort William (Corpach) to Inverness
Location	Distance(approx)	Planned	Actual	Delay	Notes
Corpach Double Lock (d)	0.0 mi (0 km)	23 June 13:00	23 June 13:00	-1 hr	Day 4 start, Load one carriage
Banavie ferry pontoon	1.0 mi (1.6 km)	23 June	23 June	-1 hr	
Ferry (launch)	1.0 mi (1.6 km)	23 June	23 June		
Neptune's Staircase ferry terminal	1.1 mi (1.8 km)	23 June	23 June 16:00		Following recovery
Neptune's Staircase ferry turntable	1.1 mi (1.8 km)	23 June	24 June 11:20	-1 day	Day 5 start, 20m delay water in gas burner
Muirshearlich	4.0 mi (6.4 km)	23 June	24 June		
Moy Bridge (a)	6.0 mi (9.7 km)		24 June		
Moy Bridge (d)	6.0 mi (9.7 km)		25 June		Day 6 start
R. Lochy Weir bridge	6.9 mi (11.1 km)		25 June		
Gairlochy swingbridge	7.3 mi (11.7 km)		25 June		
Gairlochy Bay	7.6 mi (12.2 km)		25 June		17% incline - first reverse climb
D Bridge	8.6 mi (13.8 km)		25 June		One of these streams, jerky ride
Salmon Point North (a)	9.6 mi (15.4 km)		25 June		Previous terrain described by Dick as positively evil
Salmon Point North (d)	9.6 mi (15.4 km)		26 June		Day 7 start
Achnacarry Interchange	9.9 mi (15.9 km)		26 June		Boiler water empty 100m later, 3hr stoppage
River Arkaig	10.5 mi (16.9 km)		26 June		
Clunes Forest Parkway	11.6 mi (18.7 km)		26 June		Next Loch Lochy NW shore
Dearg Allt (a)	15.1 mi (24.3 km)	26 June 11:00	26 June 18:00		In S. Laggan Forest, L. Lochy shore
Dearg Allt (d)	15.1 mi (24.3 km)		27 June 08:00		Day 8 start, continuing Loch Lochy NW shore
Laggan Lochs	19.0 mi (30.6 km)		27 June		Truss bridge
Great Glen Water Park	20.5 mi (33.0 km)		27 June		
Invergarry railway station	20.8 mi (33.5 km)		27 June		
Loch Oich tunnel	24.1 mi (38.8 km)		27 June		61 metres (67 yd)
Easter Aberchalder Hydro Bridge	24.4 mi (39.3 km)		27 June		
Aberchalder Swing Bridge (a)	24.8 mi (39.9 km)		28 June 00:05		Stopped after midnight after crossing bridge
Aberchalder Swing Bridge (d)	24.8 mi (39.9 km)		28 June		Day 9 start, Little John takes over
Aberchalder Spillway Viaduct	25.0 mi (40.2 km)		28 June		
Cullochy Lock	25.2 mi (40.6 km)		28 June		350 m past lock Silver Lady takes over after refuelling fire
Kytra Lock	27.2 mi (43.8 km)		28 June		
Fort Augustus	29.2 mi (47.0 km)		28 June 11:10		
Inchnacardoch Canyon	30.1 mi (48.4 km)		28 June		Trestle bridge
Inch Mountain Summit	31.5 mi (50.7 km)		28 June		Climbed by counterbalance
Portclair Burn Bridge	33.8 mi (54.4 km)		28 June		Approaching side of 'Snout of the Pig' mountain
Innerack Burn Bridge	34.1 mi (54.9 km)		28 June		Significant derailment and crash
River Moriston Bridge	38.7 mi (62.3 km)		28 June		Invermoriston village
Invermoriston Summit Bridge	40.2 mi (64.7 km)		28 June		
Lower Viewpoint Halt (a)	40.7 mi (65.5 km)		28 June		
Lower Viewpoint Halt (d)	40.7 mi (65.5 km)		29 June 07:55		Day 10 start
Alltsigh Bridge	42.2 mi (67.9 km)		29 June		
Allt Ghiubhais Bridge	43.8 mi (70.5 km)		29 June		
Grotaig Burn Bridge	48.0 mi (77.2 km)		29 June		Clay Works and cafe
River Coiltie	52.0 mi (83.7 km)		30 June 02:15		Day 11, Hadrian does not know what day it is
River Errick	52.5 mi (84.5 km)		30 June		
Drumnadrochit Nessieland	52.6 mi (84.7 km)		30 June		
Drumnadrochit RNLI	53.9 mi (86.7 km)		30 June		
Milepost 56	56.0 mi (90.1 km)		30 June		
Allt Coire Foitaneas	57.0 mi (91.7 km)		30 June		
Allt Lon na Fiodhaige	59.0 mi (95.0 km)		30 June		
Abriachan Eco Cafe	60.0 mi (96.6 km)		30 June		
Milepost 64 (a)	64.0 mi (103.0 km)	30 June	1 July	-5hr+	Little John finishes
Milepost 64 (d)	64.0 mi (103.0 km)	1 July 07:00	1 July 07:00		Day 12 start, Silver Lady resumes
Mac Gruer's Pond	67.0 mi (107.8 km)	1 July	1 July		Inverness in sight
Inverness District Asylum	67.5 mi (108.6 km)	1 July	1 July		
Caledonian Helix	69.0 mi (111.0 km)	1 July	1 July		
Ness Islands	70.0 mi (112.7 km)	1 July	1 July		Change for Ness Islands Railway
Inverness Castle	71.0 mi (114.3 km)	1 July 14:00	1 July 14:30	-0.5hr	

== Incidents ==
A number of incidents occurred during the construction and operation of the railway:

- Multiple derailments.
- Train Ferry capsizing while traversing the first lock at Neptune's Staircase.
- Widespread midge attack due to 49 billion more midges above normal near Lochaber
- Track deformation due to temperature expansion.
- Loss of last working quad bike in Caledonian Canal.
- Two serious dry boiler incidents where the boiler was let run to empty with heat still applied by unsupervised trainee crews, one just after Anchnacarry and one after Fort Augustus. This can weaken or permanently damage the boiler and it may take two to three hours to safely let the locomotive cool and get back up to steam after this form of incident.

== Health and safety ==
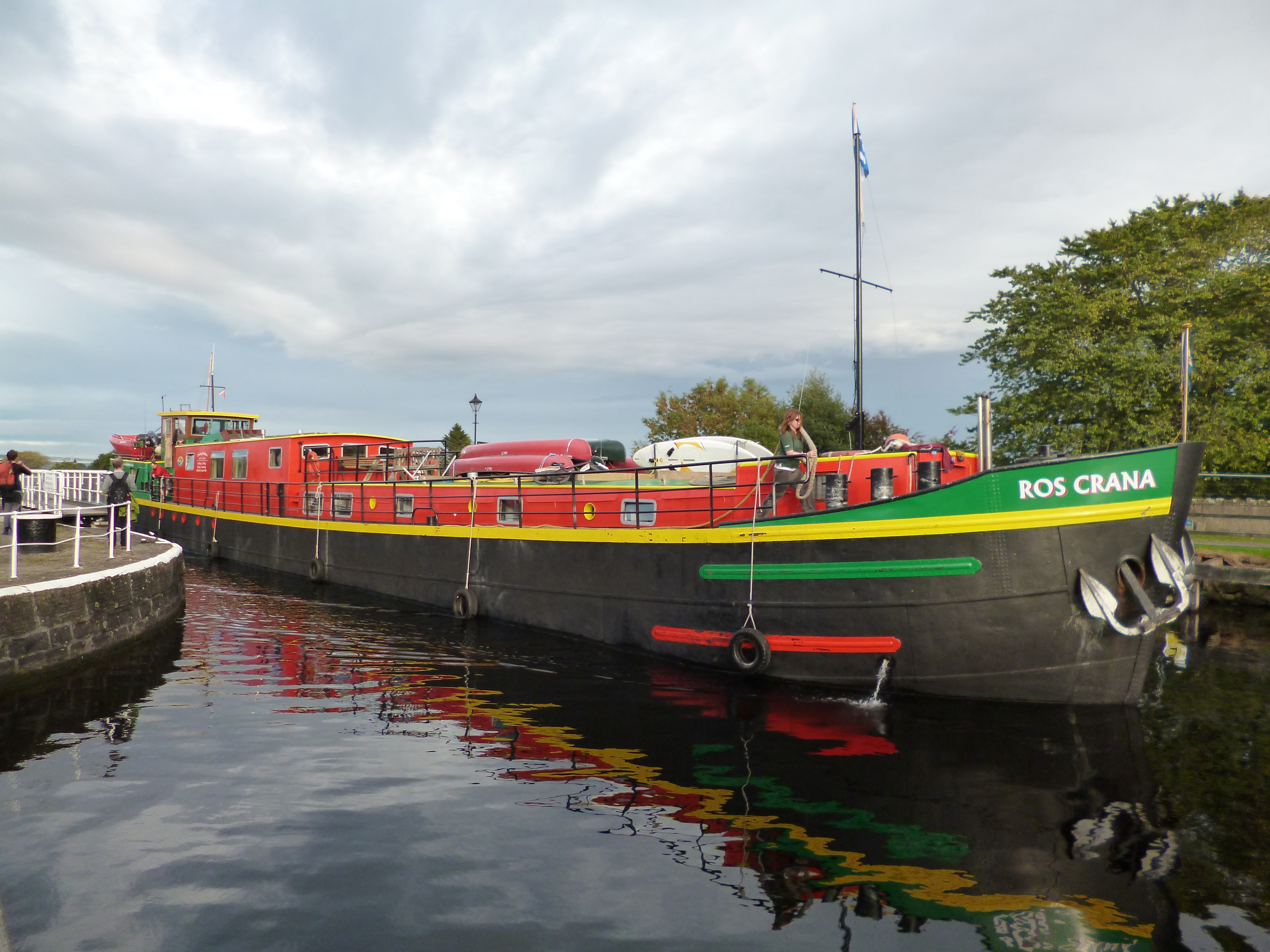
Ros Crana - the barge that rescued the train teams' quad bike from the canal after it was causing a danger to shipping

Health and safety was a major consideration on the project.

== Television series ==
The project was recorded and supported by a television production of the same name. Love Productions was commissioned by Channel 4 to produce the series.
