= Meall na h-Eilde =

Hill in Highland, Scotland

Coordinates: 57.0065°N 4.9899°W

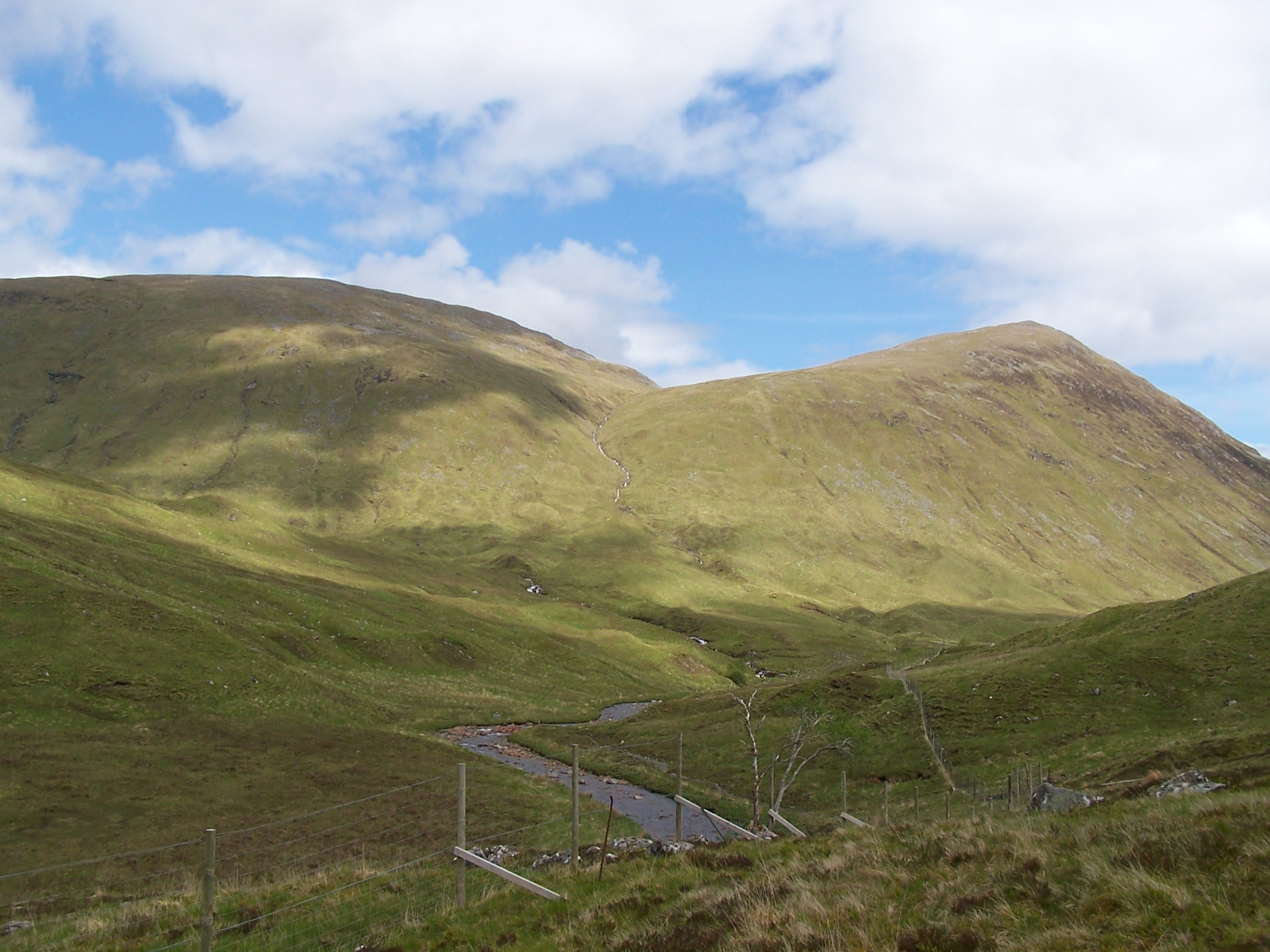
- Seen from the head of Gleann Cia-aig, Two km to the south. The main summit to the left and the conical Meall an Tagraidh to the right.

Highest point
- Elevation: 838 m (2,749 ft)
- Prominence: 453 m (1,486 ft)
- Listing: Corbett, Marilyn

Naming
- English translation: Hill Of The Hind
- Language of name: Gaelic
- Pronunciation: [ˈmjaul̪ˠ n̪ˠə ˈheltʲə]

Geography
- Location: Highland, Scotland
- Parent range: Northwest Highlands
- OS grid: NN185946
- Topo map: OS Landranger 34, OS Explorer 400

Meall na h-Eilde is a Scottish hill situated in the high ground between the Great Glen and Glen Garry, 23 km north of Fort William in the Highland Council Area.

== Overview ==
Meall na h-Eilde reaches a height of 838 metres (2749 feet) making it the 110th highest Corbett and the 336th highest Marilyn. The hill has only been included on the list of Corbetts since 1981 when resurveying by the Ordnance Survey raised its height to 838 metres and above that of the nearby Meall Coire nan Saobhaidh which before that was regarded as the Corbett.

=== History ===
The hills outlying top Meall an Tagraidh which lies just over a kilometre south-east of the main summit has some historical interest. This summit was used as a hideout for several days and nights by the fugitive Charles Edward Stuart during his flight following the Battle of Culloden in mid April 1746. The fugitive prince was supplied with whisky, cheese and bread by Cameron of Clunes during his stay on the hill. The hills name translates from the Scottish Gaelic as Hill of the Hinds and is so called because the hills steep walled eastern corrie Coire an Tagraidh gave good shelter from the western gales and was a good place for hinds to protect and rear their young.

== Geography ==
Meall na h-Eilde has only one distinctive ridge which goes northerly towards Glen Garry, it runs for 1.5 km, passing several small lochans before reaching a shoulder on the ridge known as Gearr Leacann (Short Steep Ridge) (517 metres). From here it descends steeply to the Glen Garry forestry plantation where it broadens out into the valley floor. A broader ridge goes south west for 1.5 km to a spot height at 681 metres where it narrows and steepens considerably to reach the head of Gleann Tarsuinn. Meall na h-Eilde is connected to its two outlying tops Meall Coire nan Saobhaidh and Meall an Tagraidh by high cols. Meall Coire nan Saobhaidh lies a kilometre to the north-west across the Bealach Choire a’ Ghuirein (The Pass of the Corrie of the Pimple) which has a height 722 metres.

The hill is connected to Meall an Tagraidh, an attractive conical hill, by the Bealach an Easain (The Pass of the Little Waterfall) which has an approximate height of 630 metres. A ruined iron fence runs along the skyline ridge between the main summit and these two outliers which formerly marked the old parish boundary and this can be an aid to navigation in poor weather. The hill stands on the main drainage divide of Scotland with its southern flowing streams reaching the Great Glen and going by Loch Lochy and Loch Linnhe to reach the west coast. Drainage from its northern slope go via the River Garry to reach the Great Glen at Loch Oich and then goes eastward via Loch Ness to reach the sea at Inverness.

== Ascents ==
Meall na h-Eilde is often climbed in conjunction with another Corbett Geal Charn which lies 4 km to the west. Approaches to the hill are possible from the north (Glen Garry) and the south (eastern end of Loch Arkaig) although the southern approach is shorter and more popular. The southern route starts at the car park at the Eas Chia-aig waterfall at grid reference NN176888 and follows a track north through the trees of Gleann Cia-aig to reach open moorland after four km where the hill comes fully into view. A footbridge is crossed and it is a steep climb to the Bealach an Easain from where the summit is easily reached. The northern approach starts at Greenfield in Glen Garry (NH200005) and takes a path south west through the forest for three km to reach the Allt Coire nan Saobhaidh stream from where the northern ridge can be gained which leads to the summit cairn which stands on the northern side of the old fence. The hills considerable prominence of 453 metres gives a good uninterrupted view of the surroundings.
