= Clunes, Lochaber =

Coordinates: 56.95181°N 4.95526°W

Clunes
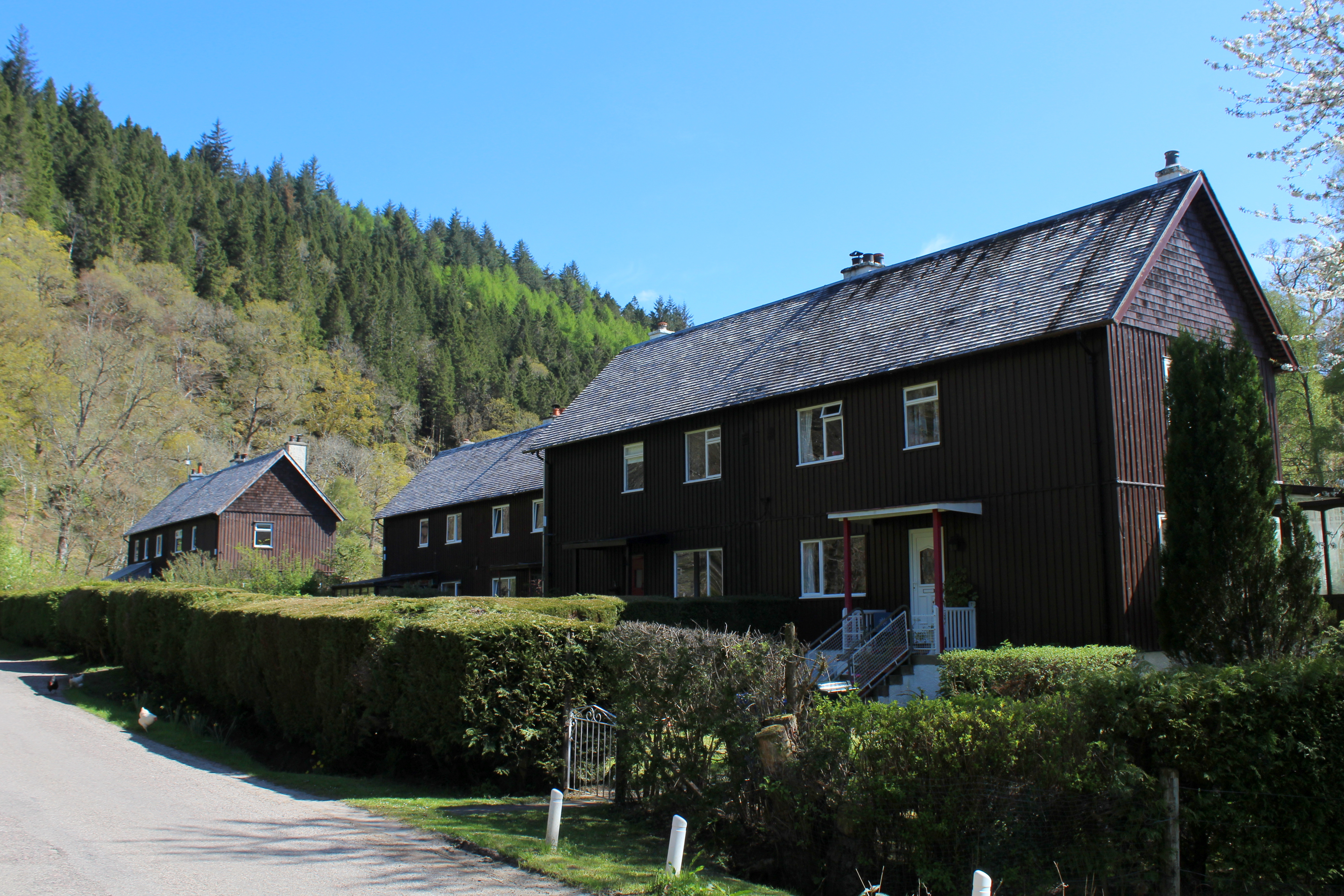

- Location within the Lochaber area
- OS grid reference: NN203883
- Council area: Highland
- Country: Scotland
- Sovereign state: United Kingdom
- Post town: Spean Bridge
- Postcode district: PH34
- Police: Scotland
- Fire: Scottish
- Ambulance: Scottish

Clunes is a small hamlet, located on the west shore of Loch Lochy, less than 1/2 mile (800 metres) northeast of Bunarkaig in Inverness-shire, Scottish Highlands and is in the Highland council area of Scotland.

== Geography ==
Clunes lies four miles (six kilometres) northeast of Gairlochy and 10 miles (16 km) northeast of Spean Bridge. The B8005 road passes by Clunes on Loch Lochy, and heads west to Loch Arkaig. This section is known as the Mìle Dorcha (Gaelic for "dark mile"), as the road runs through a heavily tree-lined, steep sided valley. The Great Glen Way long-distance Path/Cycle track (#78) also passes by Clunes, as it follows paths and forest tracks alongside Loch Lochy.

== Notable people ==
Charles Kennedy is buried at his family's cemetery at Clunes.
