= Laggan, Great Glen =

Coordinates: 57.033°N 4.813°W

Laggan: Scottish Gaelic: An Lagan
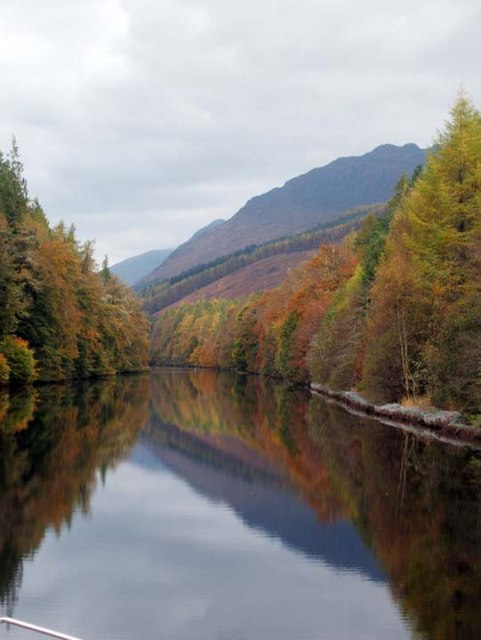
- Laggan Avenue reflections

- Location within the Lochaber area
- OS grid reference: NN294971
- Council area: Highland
- Country: Scotland
- Sovereign state: United Kingdom
- Post town: NEWTOWNMORE
- Postcode district: PH20
- Dialling code: 01809
- Police: Scotland
- Fire: Scottish
- Ambulance: Scottish

Laggan (Scottish Gaelic: An Lagan) is a small village in the Great Glen, in the Highland region of Scotland. The older, longer Gaelic name is Lagan Achaidh Droma, "hollow at the field of the ridge".

== Geography ==
Laggan is often considered to be two separate settlements, North Laggan and South Laggan, about one mile apart, both situated between Loch Lochy and Loch Oich. The Caledonian Canal passes by Laggan, linking these two lochs. Laggan Locks, a flight of two locks, connects the canal to Loch Oich.

The main A82 road between Glasgow and Inverness passes through Laggan, crossing the canal at Laggan Swing Bridge.

The Great Glen Way long-distance footpath passes by Laggan, running alongside the canal and following the old railway line.

== History ==
The Battle of the Shirts was fought nearby in July 1544 between the Macdonalds of Rannald and Clan Fraser of Lovat in the Great Glen, overlooking Loch Lochy.

The Invergarry and Fort Augustus Railway once passed by Laggan. This line opened in 1896, with Invergarry railway station situated at North Laggan. The line closed to passengers in 1933, and to freight in 1947.

== Gallery ==
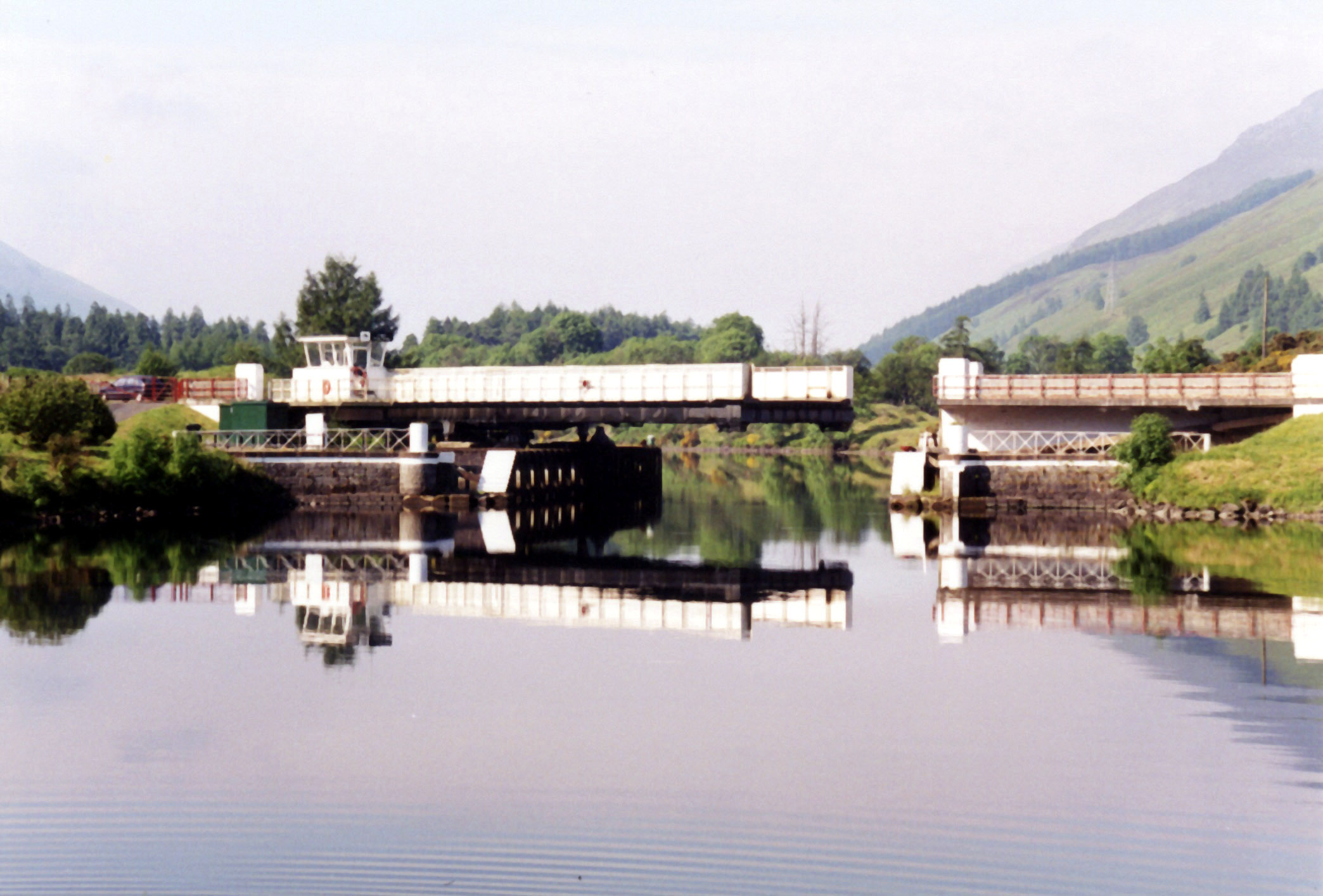
Laggan swing bridge

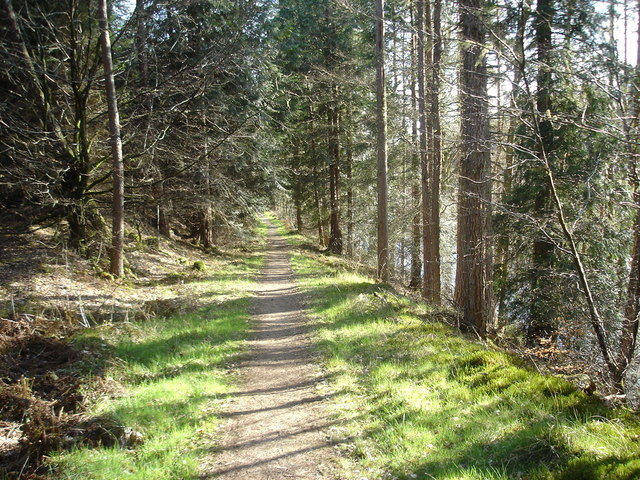
Footpath alongside the canal, near Laggan

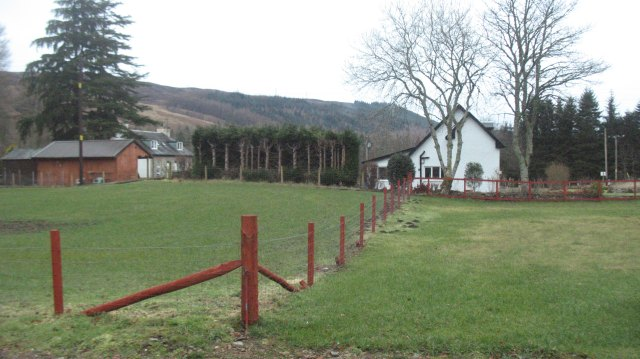
Fields and scattered houses in Laggan, view from the hostel
