= River Lochy =

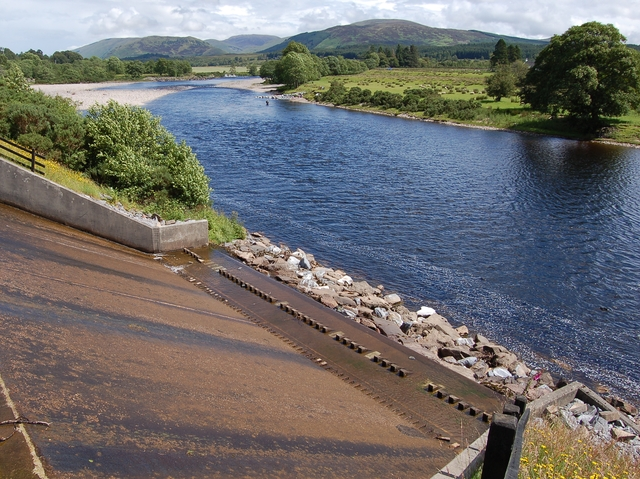
- The Lochy near Gairlochy

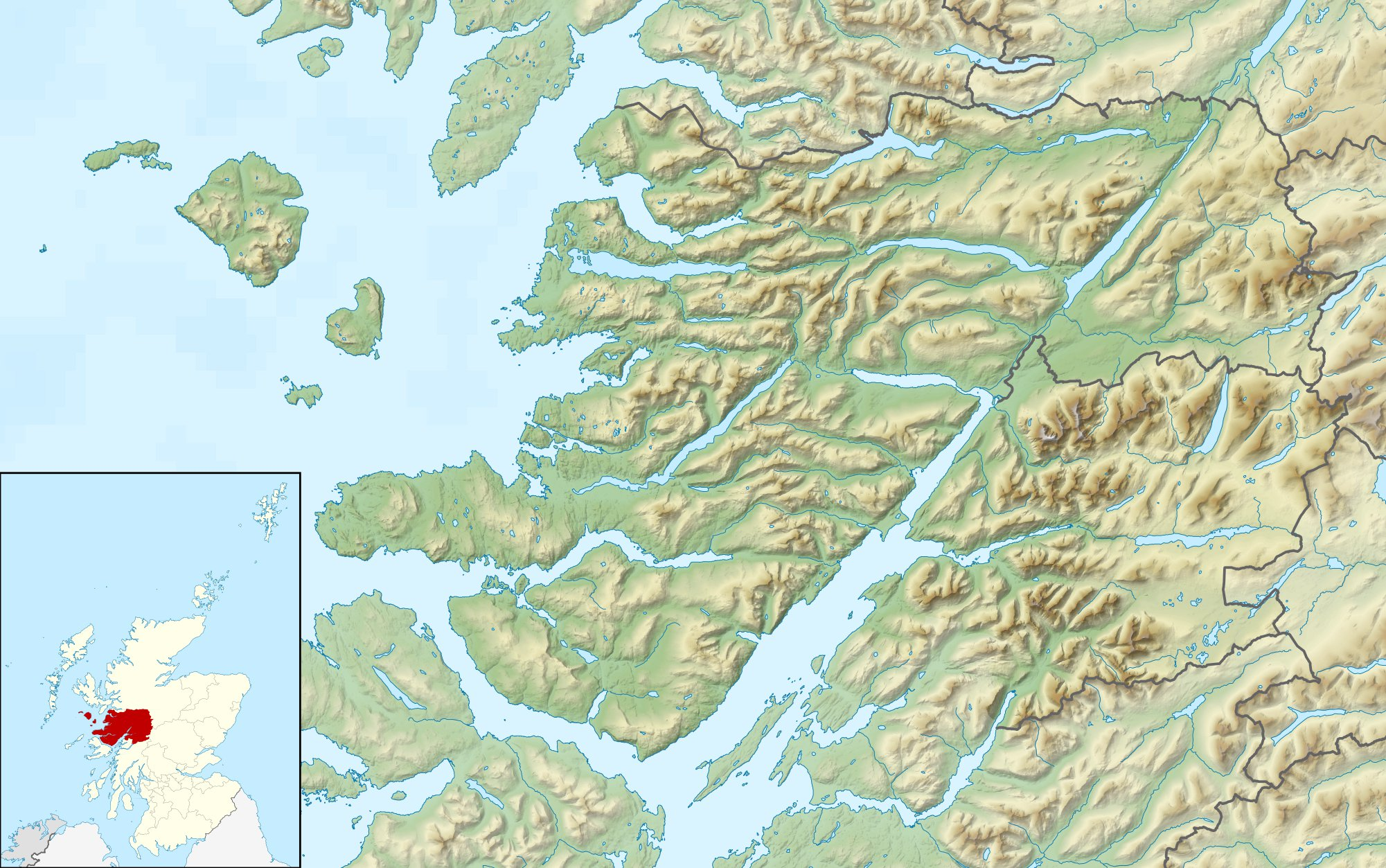
- Location of the mouth within Lochaber

Location
- Country: Scotland

Physical characteristics
- Source: Loch Lochy
- Mouth: Loch Linnhe
  - coordinates: 56°49′32″N 5°06′36″W
  - elevation: 0 m (0 ft)

The River Lochy flows southwest along the Great Glen from Loch Lochy to Loch Linnhe at Fort William in the West Highlands of Scotland. Its two major tributaries are the short River Arkaig which drains Loch Arkaig into Loch Lochy and the River Spean which enters on its left bank at Gairlochy. The A830 road crosses the Lochy near its junction with the A82 road by means of the Victoria or Lochy Bridge just northeast of Fort William and the river is bridged again east of Gairlochy by the B8004 road. The only other crossing of the Lochy is a combined rail and foot bridge 500 metres (1,600 ft) downstream from Victoria Bridge. This span takes the West Highland Line between Fort William and Mallaig and carries the Great Glen Way national trail.

== See also ==
- List of rivers of Scotland
