= Invergarry =

Coordinates: 57.06892°N 4.80086°W

Invergarry: Scottish Gaelic: Inbhir Gharadh
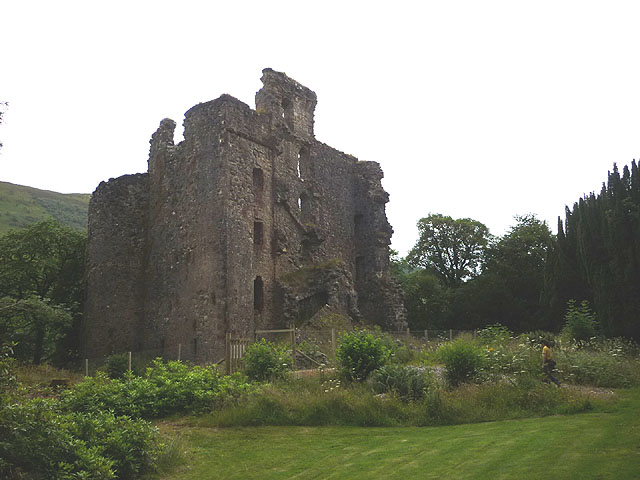
- Invergarry Castle; Caisteal Dubh Inbhir Gharaidh

- Location within the Lochaber area
- Population: 438
- OS grid reference: NH302010
- Council area: Highland
- Country: Scotland
- Sovereign state: United Kingdom
- Post town: INVERGARRY
- Postcode district: PH35
- Dialling code: 01809
- Police: Scotland
- Fire: Scottish
- Ambulance: Scottish
- UK Parliament: Ross, Skye and Lochaber
- Scottish Parliament: Skye, Lochaber and Badenoch

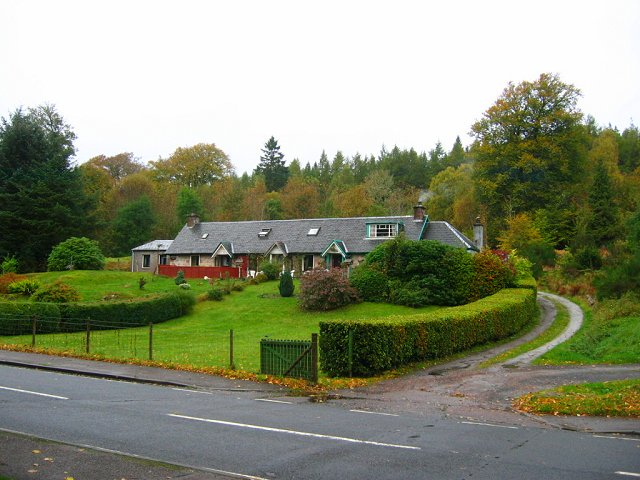
Cottages in Invergarry

Invergarry (Scottish Gaelic: Inbhir Gharadh) is a village in the Highlands of Scotland, located about 25 miles (40 km) north-east of Fort William in the Great Glen. The name means "confluence of the River Garry (Abhainn Gharaidh)" in Gaelic and fittingly, Invergarry is near where the river flows into Loch Oich.

== Geography ==
Near the centre of the village is the junction between the A82 road (from Inverness to Fort William) and the A87 road which branches off to the west towards Skye. The ruined Invergarry Castle is situated near the village on Creagan an Fhithich (the Raven's Rock), overlooking Loch Oich. As well as playing host to the local shinty club, Glengarry Shinty Club, it is the home town of shinty player, James Clark.

Invergarry Church (Church of Scotland) is situated on the hillside above the A87 road. The village has a primary school with a roll of 33.

== See also ==
- Invergarry railway station
