= Silver Lady =

Silver Lady may refer to the following:

- "Silver Lady (song)", song by David Soul
- For the Rolls-Royce emblem see Spirit of Ecstasy
- Silver Lady (model locomotive), the model steam locomotive used on The Biggest Little Railway in the World
- Sam Tan (archer), known as the "Silver Lady"
