= Invergarry railway station =

Railway station in Highland, Scotland

Invergarry
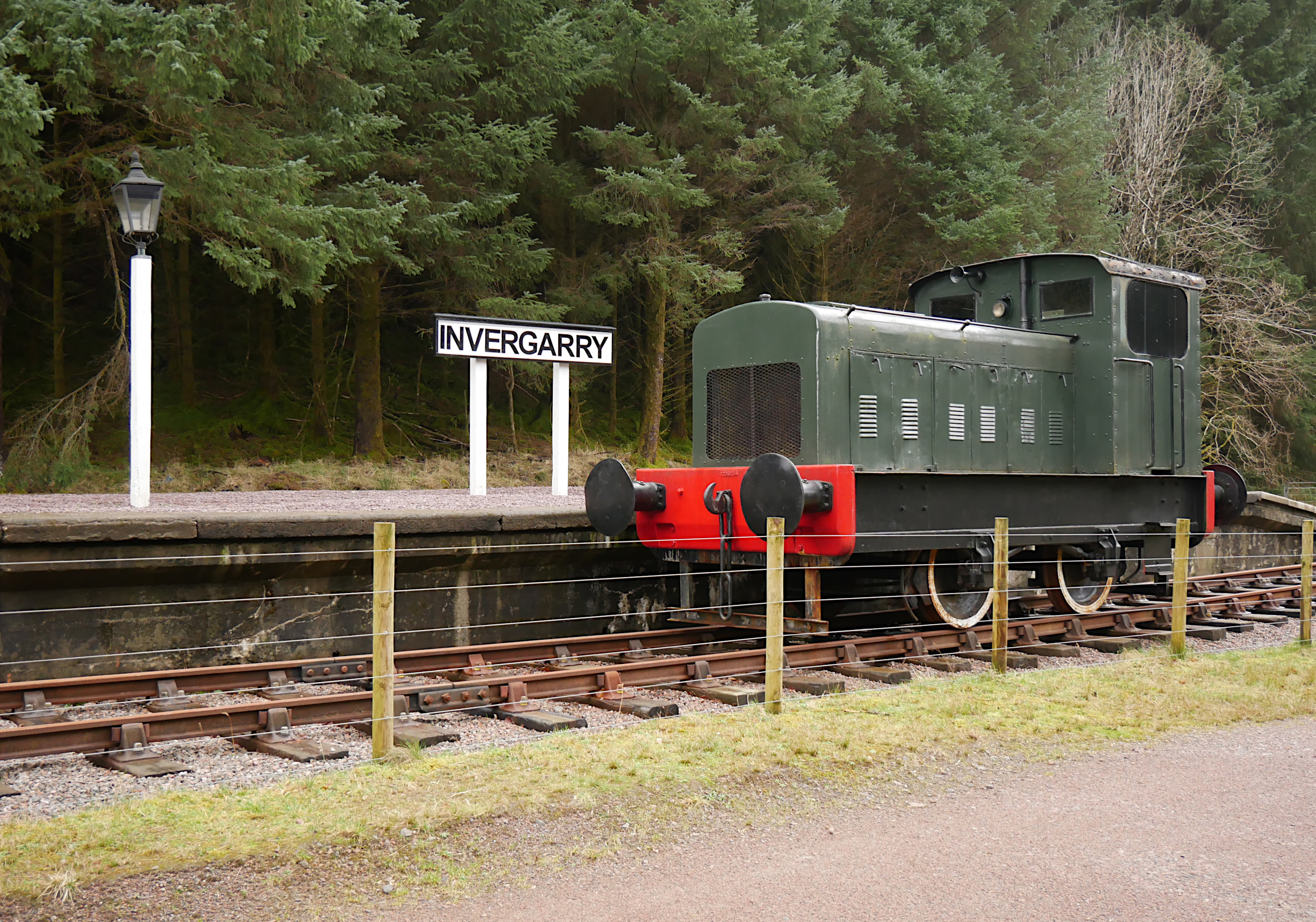
- The static railway museum at Invergarry station

General information
- Location: Laggan, Great Glen, Highland; Scotland
- Coordinates: 57.0458°N 4.7965°W
- Grid reference: NN304984
- Platforms: 2

Other information
- Status: Disused

History
- Original company: Invergarry and Fort Augustus Railway
- Pre-grouping: North British Railway
- Post-grouping: London and North Eastern Railway

Key dates
- 22 July 1903: Station opened
- 1 November 1911: Station closed
- 1 August 1913: Station opened
- 1 December 1933: Station closed
Location

Invergarry railway station is situated in the Highlands of Scotland at the southern end of Loch Oich, on the eastern side, and not far from the Laggan swing bridge over the Caledonian canal. It is about 2 miles (3.2 km) from the village of Invergarry.

== History ==
The station was opened on 22 July 1903. It was provided with a water column. The company appointed James Morrison as station master. The station was operated by the Highland Railway from 1903 to 1907, and then by the North British Railway until 1922. From 1923 it was operated by the London and North Eastern Railway.

In September 1905, King Edward VII travelled over the line from Spean Bridge to Invergarry with George Cadogan, 5th Earl Cadogan and Countess Cadogan. The station at Invergarry was specially decorated for the occasion. The King was visiting Lord and Lady Burton at Glenquoich Lodge.

The station closed to passenger services on 1 December 1933, although the line remained open for goods traffic until 31 December 1946.

The station is now being restored by the Invergarry and Fort Augustus Railway Museum, and the site includes a short length of track.

Preceding station	Disused railways	Following station
Invergloy Platform	North British Railway; Invergarry and Fort Augustus Railway	Aberchalder
