= Spean Bridge railway station =

Railway station in Highland, Scotland

Spean Bridge Scottish Gaelic: Drochaid Aonachain
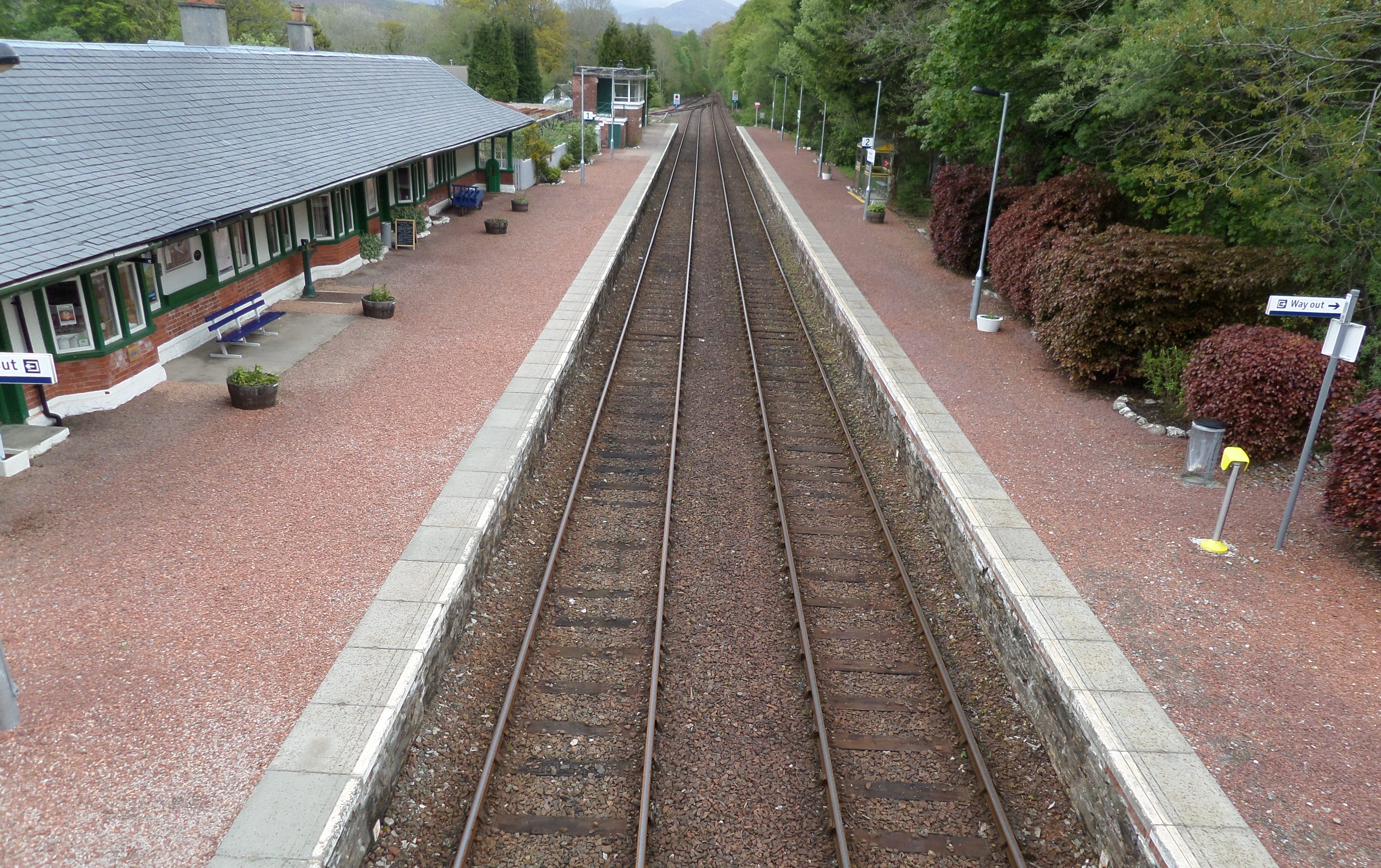

General information
- Location: Spean Bridge, Highland; Scotland
- Coordinates: 56.8899°N 4.9215°W
- Grid reference: NN221814
- Manager: ScotRail
- Platforms: 2

Other information
- Station code: SBR

Key dates
- 7 August 1894: Opened
- 22 July 1903: Services to Fort Augustus commenced
- 1 December 1933: Passenger service to Fort Augustus withdrawn

Passengers
- 2021/22: ▲4,836
- 2022/23: ▲5,932
- 2023/24: ▲7,850
- 2024/25: ▼7,516
- 2025/26: ▲8,164

Listed Building – Category C(S)
- Designated: 5 October 2010
- Reference no.: LB51615
Location
Notes
- Passenger statistics from the Office of Rail and Road

Spean Bridge railway station is a railway station serving the village of Spean Bridge in the Highland region of Scotland. This station is on the West Highland Line, between Roy Bridge and Fort William, sited 90 miles 56 chains (146 km) from Craigendoran Junction, near Helensburgh. ScotRail manage the station and operate most services, along with Caledonian Sleeper.

== History ==
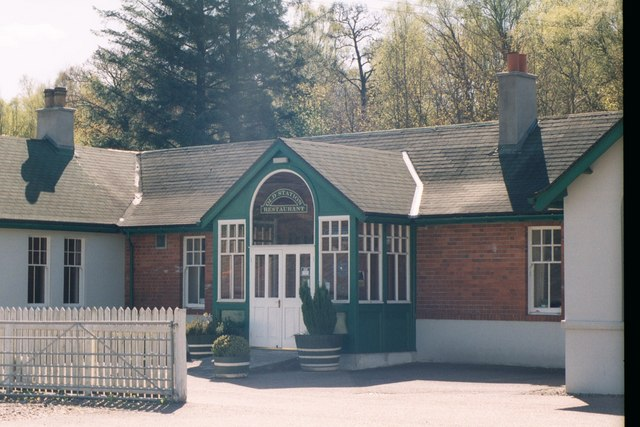
The former station building, now a restaurant

The station opened on 7 August 1894. The station buildings were designed by James Miller.

Between 1903 and December 1933, there was a branch line from this station which offered service north up the Great Glen to Fort Augustus, terminating at a pier on Loch Ness. The North British railway extended Spean Bridge adding a bay platform at the west end at a cost of £303 0s 5d (equivalent to £31,853.55 in 2025) to accommodate Invergarry and Fort Augustus Railway trains. The I&FA line was not successful. Passenger services stopped in 1933 and the line was eventually abandoned completely in 1947.

The station was host to a LNER camping coach from 1936 to 1939. A camping coach was also positioned here by the Scottish Region from 1961 until all camping coaches in the region were withdrawn at the end of the 1969 season.

== Facilities ==
The station buildings are on platform 1, which passengers can use for shelter, whilst platform 2 only has a rudimentary glass structure. The help point is on platform 1, and the car park and bike racks are also adjacent to this platform. Both platforms have step-free access. As there are no facilities to purchase tickets, passengers must buy one in advance, or from the guard on the train.

== Passenger volume ==
Passenger Volume at Spean Bridge
	2004–05	2005–06	2006–07	2007–08	2008–09	2009–10	2010–11	2011–12	2012–13	2013–14	2014–15	2015–16	2016–17	2017–18	2018–19	2019–20	2020–21	2021–22	2022–23	2023–24	2024–25
Entries and exits	5,911	5,725	6,361	6,345	6,570	6,312	6,386	6,960	6,558	6,808	7,240	7,332	6,262	7,444	7,452	7,832	946	4,836	5,932	7,850	7,516

The statistics cover twelve month periods that start in April.

== Services ==
Mondays to Saturdays, the station is served by three ScotRail trains per day in each direction, northbound to Mallaig and southbound to Glasgow Queen Street, along with the Highland Caledonian Sleeper between London Euston and Fort William via Edinburgh Waverley (the latter doesn't run southbound on Saturday nights or northbound on Sunday mornings). Sundays see two trains per day call each way, as well as the southbound sleeper. The sleeper also carries seated coaches and thus can be used by regular travellers to/from Glasgow Queen Street (Low Level) and Edinburgh.

Preceding station	National Rail	Following station
Roy Bridge	ScotRail; West Highland Line	Fort William
Roy Bridge	Caledonian Sleeper; Highland Caledonian Sleeper	Fort William
	Historical railways	
Roy Bridge; Line and Station open	West Highland Railway	Fort William; Line and Station open
Terminus	Invergarry and Fort Augustus Railway	Gairlochy; Line and Station closed
