= River Oich =

Coordinates: 57°08′N 4°52′W

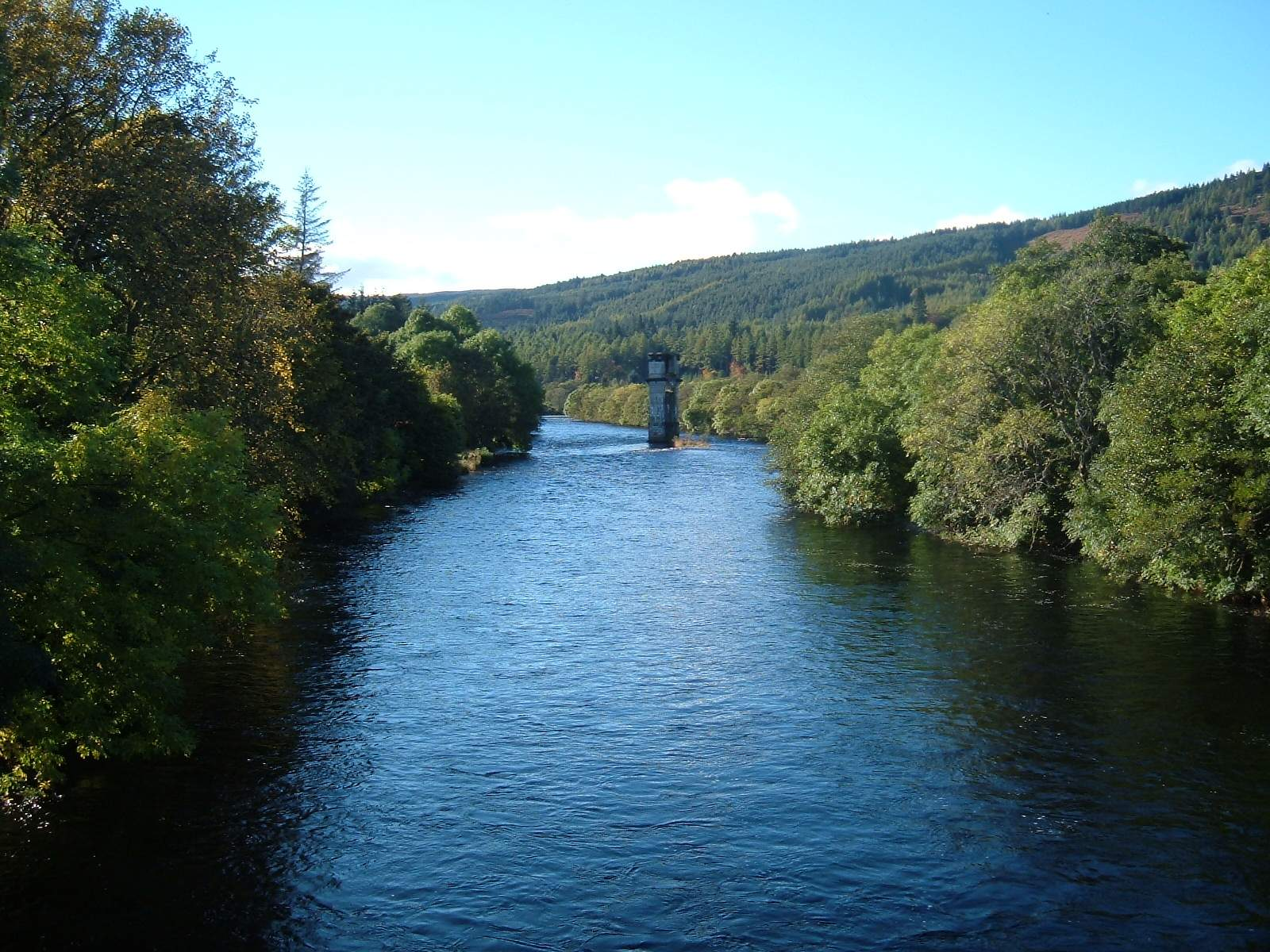
River Oich near Fort Augustus

The River Oich (Scottish Gaelic: Abhainn Obhaich) is a short river that flows through the Great Glen in Scotland. It carries water from Loch Oich (to the SW) to Loch Ness (to the NE) and runs in parallel to a section of the Caledonian Canal for the whole of its 5.6 miles (9 km) length. The Great Glen Way runs between the two watercourses. The river's largest tributary is the Invigar Burn. The only significant settlement on the river is Fort Augustus at its NE end.
