= Invergloy Platform railway station =

Railway station in Scotland

Invergloy Platform

General information
- Location: Inverness-shire; Scotland
- Coordinates: 56.9549°N 4.9119°W
- Grid reference: NN229885
- Platforms: 1

Other information
- Status: Disused

History
- Original company: Invergarry and Fort Augustus Railway
- Pre-grouping: Highland Railway

Key dates
- 1 July 1904: Station opened
- 1 November 1911: Station closed
- 1 August 1913: Station re-opened
- 1 December 1933: Station closed to passengers
- 31 December 1946: Station closed for freight
Location

Invergloy Platform was a railway station in Inverness-shire, Scotland on the Invergarry and Fort Augustus Railway between 1904 and 1933.

== Overview ==
The station was opened on 1 July 1904 on the Invergarry and Fort Augustus Railway which had opened 12 months previously. It was a single platform with a waiting shelter and was sometimes known as Invergloy Station. The station was operated by the Highland Railway from 1904 to 1907, and then by the North British Railway until 1922. From 1923 it was operated by the London and North Eastern Railway.

It was expanded with two sidings put in for timber traffic during the First World War.

It closed on 1 December 1933.

Preceding station	Disused railways	Following station
Gairlochy	Highland Railway; Invergarry and Fort Augustus Railway	Invergarry
