= Fort Augustus railway station =

Railway station in Highland, Scotland

Fort Augustus
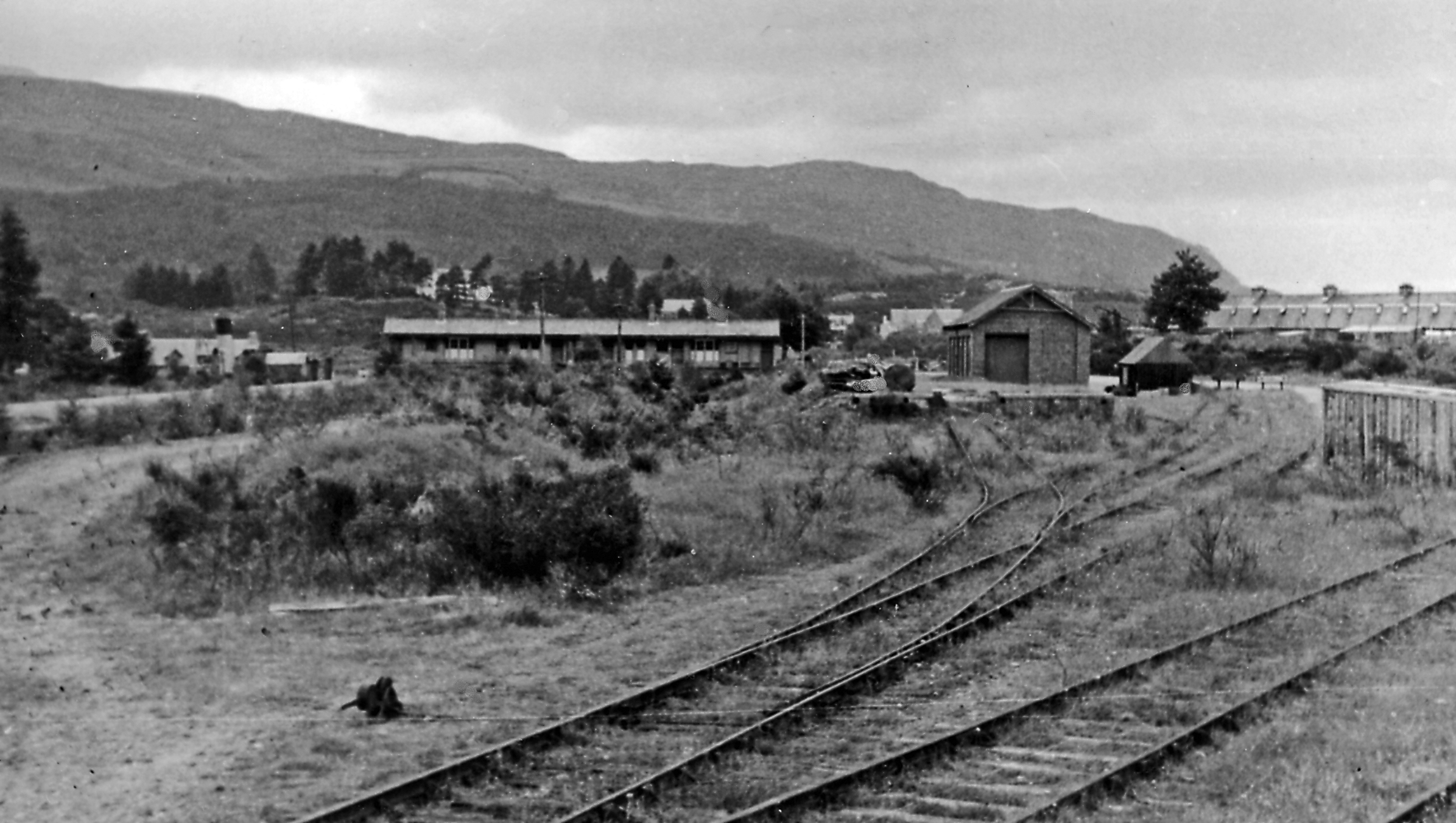
- Remains of the station in 1948

General information
- Location: Inverness-shire; Scotland
- Coordinates: 57.1435°N 4.6861°W
- Grid reference: NH375090
- Platforms: 3

Other information
- Status: Disused

History
- Original company: Invergarry and Fort Augustus Railway
- Pre-grouping: Highland Railway 1903-1907; North British Railway 1907-1922
- Post-grouping: London and North Eastern Railway

Key dates
- 22 July 1903: Station opened
- 1 November 1911: Station closed
- 1 August 1913: Station re-opened
- 1 December 1933: Station closed to passengers
- 31 December 1946: Station closed for freight
Location

Fort Augustus was a railway station in Inverness-shire, Scotland on the Invergarry and Fort Augustus Railway between 1903 and 1946.

== Overview ==
The station was opened on 22 July 1903, situated to the west of Fort Augustus on the banks of Loch Ness. The company provided two terminus platforms and one through platform for services to Fort Augustus pier. The station also contained a water column and turntable.

The station was operated by the Highland Railway from 1903 to 1907, and then by the North British Railway until 1922. From 1923, it was operated by the London and North Eastern Railway.

The Highland Railway appointed Hugh Fraser as stationmaster in 1903. In 1910, J.C. Craig was appointed stationmaster.

Passenger services were withdrawn on 1 December 1933, and the station was closed in 1946.

Preceding station	Disused railways	Following station
Aberchalder	Highland Railway; Invergarry and Fort Augustus Railway	Fort Augustus Pier
