= Aberchalder railway station =

Railway station in Highland, Scotland

Aberchalder

General information
- Location: Aberchalder, Highland; Scotland
- Coordinates: 57.098°N 4.734°W
- Grid reference: NH344040
- Platforms: 1

Other information
- Status: Disused

History
- Original company: Invergarry and Fort Augustus Railway
- Pre-grouping: North British Railway
- Post-grouping: London and North Eastern Railway

Key dates
- 22 July 1903: Station opened
- 1 November 1911: Station closed
- 1 August 1913: Station opened
- 1 December 1933: Station closed
Location

Aberchalder railway station served the village of Aberchalder, in the county of Inverness-shire in Scotland.

== History ==
It was opened by the Highland Railway (Invergarry and Fort Augustus Railway) on 22 July 1903. It became part of the North British Railway, and so joined the London and North Eastern Railway during the Grouping of 1923. The line closed to passenger traffic in 1933.

== The site today ==
Although the station building has been demolished the platform at Aberchalder remains. The southern end of the platform is intact whilst the remainder has been infilled up to the level of the platform though the coping stones are still clearly visible. The bridge still stands allowing one to overlook the site, which is now used by the logging industry as a site office. The course of the railway can be traced both north and south of the station, that south towards Loch Oich is clearly visible passing through the fields on a shallow raised embankment.

Preceding station	Disused railways	Following station
Invergarry	North British Railway; Invergarry and Fort Augustus Railway	Fort Augustus
