= Bunarkaig =

Coordinates: 56.94428°N 4.98423°W

Bunarkaig: Scottish Gaelic: Bun Airceig
- Location within the Lochaber area
- OS grid reference: NN185876
- Council area: Highland
- Country: Scotland
- Sovereign state: United Kingdom
- Postcode district: PH34 4
- Police: Scotland
- Fire: Scottish
- Ambulance: Scottish

Bunarkaig (Scottish Gaelic: Bun Airceig) is a village on the north west shore of Loch Lochy in Lochaber, Inverness-shire, Highland and is in the Scottish council area of the Highlands.
