= Gairlochy railway station =

Railway station in Highland, Scotland

Gairlochy

General information
- Location: Inverness-shire; Scotland
- Coordinates: 56.9077°N 4.9769°W
- Grid reference: NN188835
- Platforms: 2

Other information
- Status: Disused

History
- Original company: Invergarry and Fort Augustus Railway
- Pre-grouping: Highland Railway; North British Railway

Key dates
- 22 July 1903: Station opened
- 1 November 1911: Station closed
- 1 August 1913: Station re-opened
- 1 December 1933: Station closed to passengers
- 31 December 1946: Station closed for freight
Location

Gairlochy was a railway station in western Scotland. It was the first station on the Highland Railway's branch to Fort Augustus (originally the Invergarry and Fort Augustus Railway). It opened in 1903 and was closed in 1947.

== History ==
The station opened on 22 July 1903. The Highland Railway company appointed Donald Macdonald as station master in 1903. The station was operated by the Highland Railway from 1903 to 1907, and then by the North British Railway until 1922. From 1923 it was operated by the London and North Eastern Railway.

Preceding station	Disused railways	Following station
Spean Bridge	North British Railway; Invergarry and Fort Augustus Railway	Invergloy Platform
