= Fort Augustus Pier railway station =

Railway station in Highland, Scotland

Coordinates: 57.15308°N 4.67100°W

Fort Augustus Pier

General information
- Location: Inverness-shire; Scotland
- Platforms: 1

Other information
- Status: Disused

History
- Original company: Invergarry and Fort Augustus Railway
- Pre-grouping: Highland Railway

Key dates
- 22 July 1903: Station opened
- 1 October 1906: Station closed
Location

Fort Augustus Pier was a railway station in Inverness-shire, Scotland, and served as the north terminus of the Invergarry and Fort Augustus Railway between 1903 and 1906.

== Overview ==
The station was opened in 1903 as the north terminus of the line, situated outside of Fort Augustus, located on the banks of Loch Ness. The station cost a total of £348 (equivalent to £47,202 in 2023) to build.

A run round loop was included at this station to allow locomotives to run around to make a return journey. The station building featured a general waiting room, but no public conveniences.

The station was closed on 30 September 1906 due to poor traffic, and the station was dismantled when the track was lifted. Nothing of the station survives today.

Preceding station	Disused railways	Following station
Fort Augustus	Highland Railway; Invergarry and Fort Augustus Railway	Terminus
