= Great Glen Way =

Long distance trail in Scotland

Great Glen Way Slighe a' Ghlinne Mhòir
- Map of the Great Glen Way
- Length: 125 km (78 mi)
- Location: Scotland
- Established: 2002
- Designation: Scotland's Great Trails
- Trailheads: Fort William (56.821°N 5.108°W); Inverness (57.475°N 4.226°W)
- Use: Hiking and mountain biking; canoeing and kayaking on adjacent canoe trail.
- Elevation gain/loss: 1,835 metres (6,020 ft) gain
- Highest point: Abriachan Forest, 375 m (1,230 ft)
- Season: All year
- Website: https://www.highland.gov.uk/greatglenway/

The Great Glen Way (Scottish Gaelic: Slighe a' Ghlinne Mhòir) is a long distance path in Scotland. It follows the Great Glen, running from Fort William in the southwest to Inverness in the northeast, covering 125 kilometres (78 mi). It was opened in 2002, and is designated as one of Scotland's Great Trails by NatureScot. The Great Glen Way is generally walked from southwest to northeast to follow the direction of the prevailing wind. It can be walked in 5–7 days, or cycled in 2–3 days. The trail is maintained and improved by the Great Glen Ways partnership, which consists of Highland Council, Scottish Canals and Forestry and Land Scotland. About 30,000 people use the path every year, of whom about 4,500 complete the entire route.

A 114-kilometre (71 mi) temporary model railway known as The Biggest Little Railway in the World was laid and filmed over the Great Glen Way in the summer of 2017.

== Route description ==
Beginning at the Old Fort in Fort William, the Great Glen Way skirts the shores of Loch Linnhe to Corpach, and then the Caledonian Canal. The eight locks of Neptune's Staircase take the canal to 19.2 metres (63 ft) above sea level. The route passes various canal features until it reaches Loch Lochy, where forest tracks take it along the western shore before it rejoins the canal at Laggan Locks. A detour to visit a couple of Munros is an option here, but it is likely to take the best part of the day.

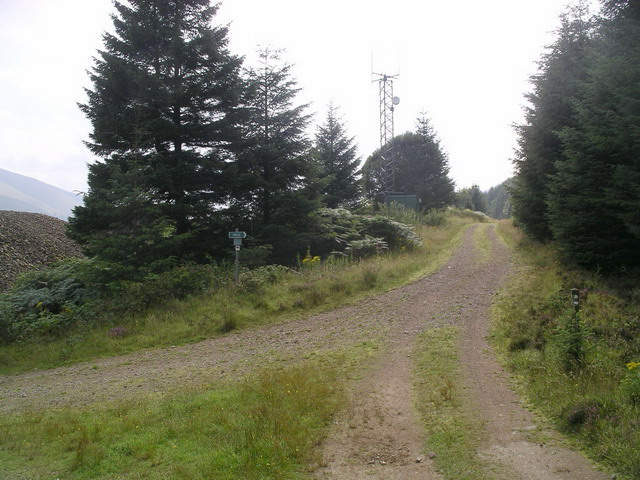
Great Glen Way on forest tracks near Loch Laggan

From Laggan Locks the route follows the towpath through Laggan Avenue to the Laggan Swing Bridge. Crossing the A82 road, it then runs along the eastern shore of Loch Oich, partly following the route of the dismantled Invergarry and Fort Augustus Railway. It returns to the canal towpath at Aberchalder, for the next section into Fort Augustus. An alternative route known as the "Invergarry Link" runs along the western side of Loch Oich, providing access to accommodation and shops in Invergarry.

From Fort Augustus the route climbs up into the forest above the NW shore of Loch Ness. There are views from the high level forest track which eventually drops into Invermoriston and out by a steep climb. High level forest track leads into the hamlet of Grotaig, then alongside the road until a path heads down through Clunebeg Wood to the banks of the River Coiltie and Borlum Bridge on the outskirts of Drumnadrochit. The route passes through the village, and up a steep hill to Abriachan. The Great Glen Way ascends a forest track giving good views traversing through the forest. Leaving the road at Blackfold, the waymarking indicates forest track at Craig Leach Forest which eventually emerges at a reservoir. The route runs downhill through the suburbs of Inverness, then follows the canal and the River Ness to the city centre, finishing at Inverness Castle.

=== New off-road section ===
Early in 2026, Highland Council started work on a new section of the route, aimed at avoiding the busy road to the south of Grotaig, which it says is at times "uncomfortable and unsafe due to traffic levels". The new section passes through the Bunloit Estate. It was opened in June.

== Great Glen Canoe Trail ==
The Great Glen Canoe Trail, Scotland’s first dedicated long distance trail for canoes and kayaks, runs along the Great Glen, close to the Great Glen Way. The 96-kilometre route includes 29 locks which must be portaged, and takes between 3–5 days to complete. The trail was formally launched in 2012, and is also designated as one of Scotland's Great Trails.

The Great Glen was first swum by Marathon swimmer Alina Warren, who completed the 117 km in July 2012. The swim used all three lochs, and river Ness, river Oich and the river Lochy instead of the canals.

== Trail connections ==
The Great Glen Way connects to several other long-distance routes at various points along its length:

- John o' Groats Trail at Inverness
- South Loch Ness Trail at Inverness
- Affric Kintail Way at Drumnadrochit
- West Highland Way at Fort William
- East Highland Way at Fort William
- Cape Wrath Trail at Fort William
