= Invergarry and Fort Augustus Railway =

Branch-line railway in Scotland

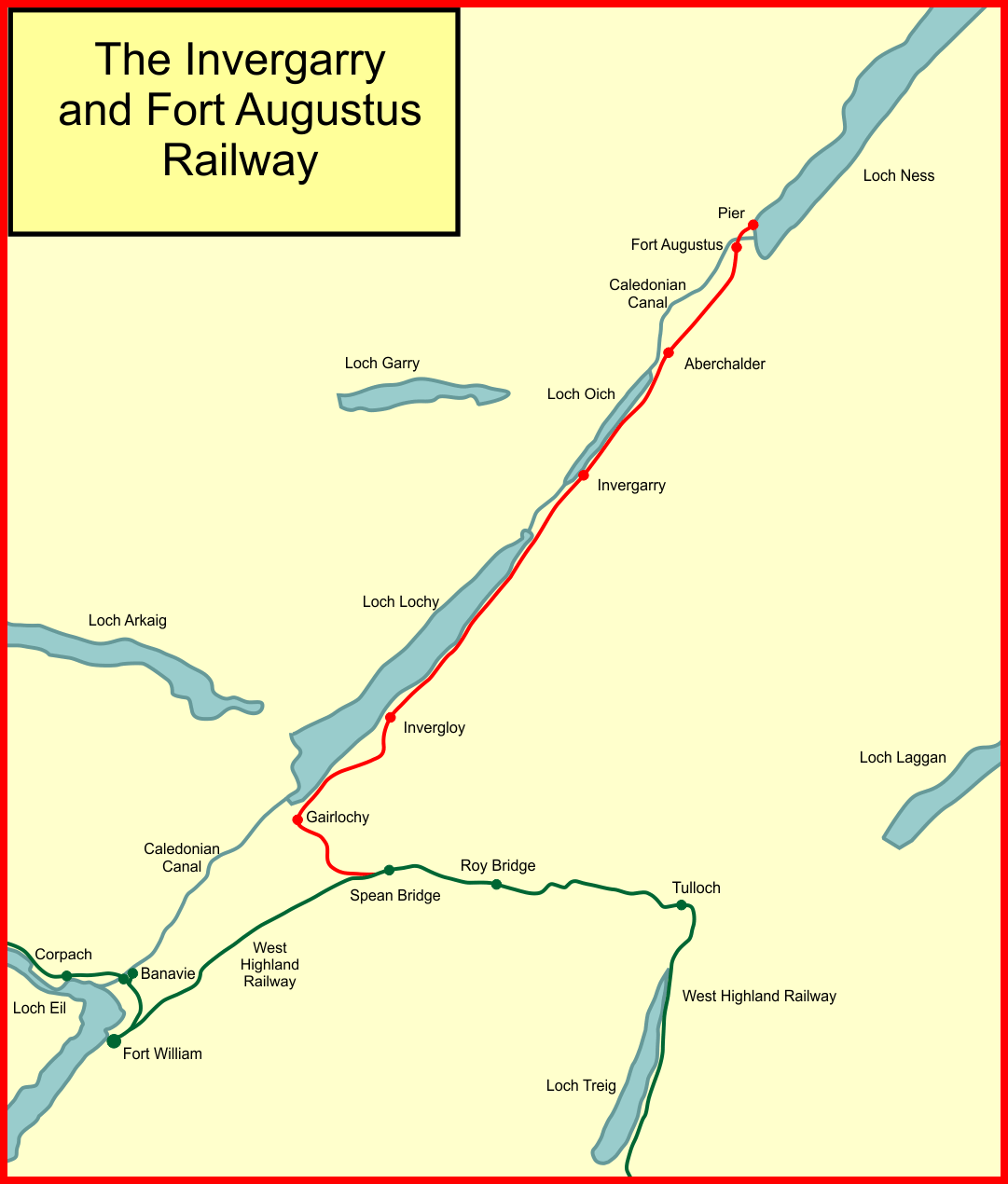
- Map of Invergarry and Fort Augustus Railway

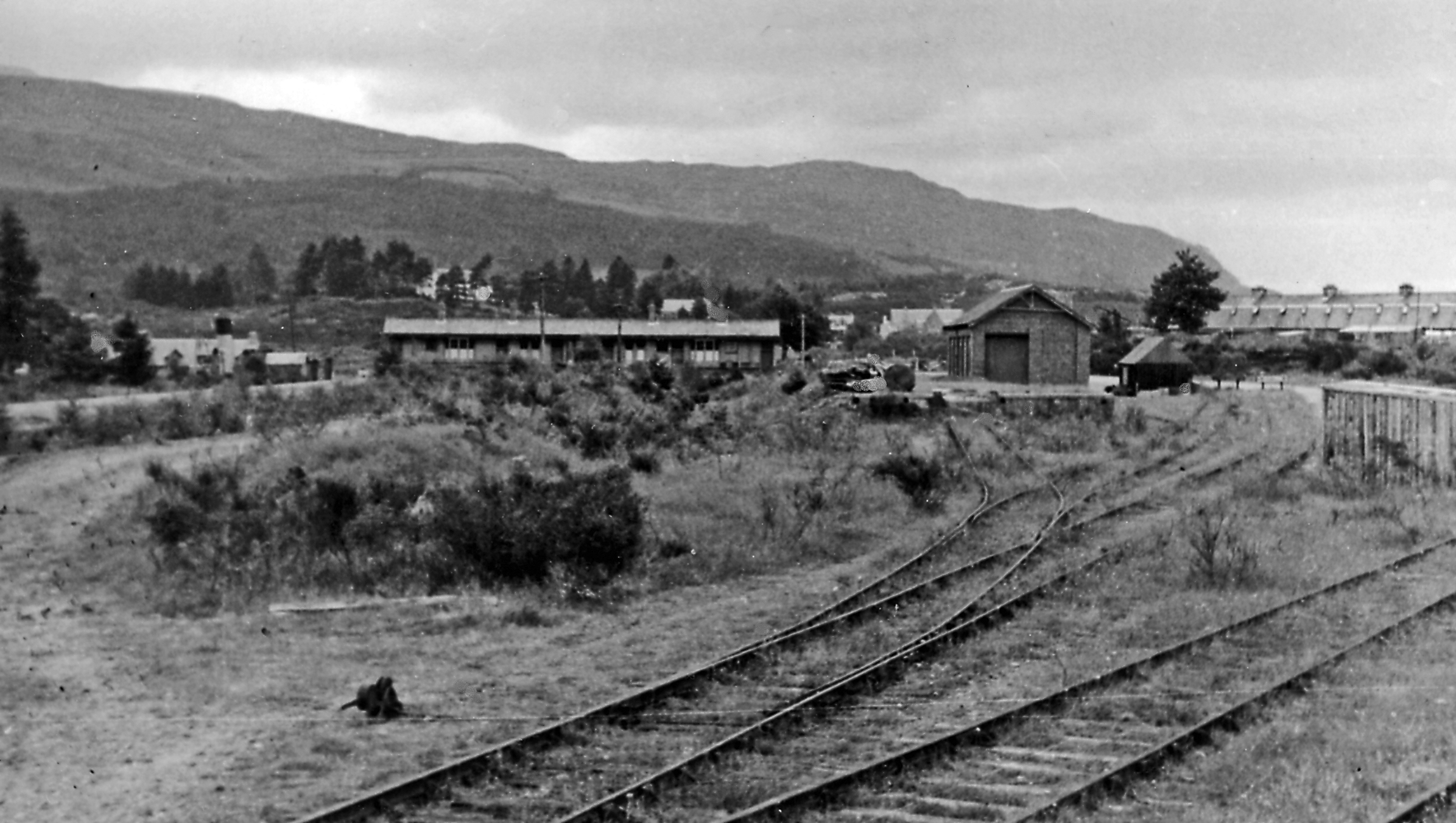
- Remains of the station and yard at Fort Augustus, photographed in 1948

Overview
- Reporting mark: I&FAR
- Dates of operation: 22 July 1903–31 December 1946
- Successor: North British Railway

Technical
- Track gauge: 4 ft 8 1/2 in (1,435 mm) standard gauge
- Length: Spean Bridge to Fort Augustus 23 miles 13 chains (37.3 km) 1903-1946; Fort Augustus to Fort Augustus Pier 73 chains (1.5 km) 1903-1906

The Invergarry and Fort Augustus Railway (I&FAR) was a branch-line railway built in Scotland, connecting the named places with the main line at Spean Bridge. It opened in 1903.

Serving exceptionally sparsely inhabited areas, it was never commercially successful, but it rekindled hostilities between larger railways over a planned railway connection along the Great Glen reaching Inverness; however this scheme never materialised.

Passenger train operation ceased in 1933 and the line closed completely in 1946.

== Background ==
The Great Glen is a fault-controlled glacial valley that runs in a straight line across the Highlands of Scotland from Fort William on Loch Linnhe in the south west to Inverness on the Moray Firth in the north east.

It forms an easy communication route. As well as roads, the Caledonian Canal was constructed along it by linking natural lochs with canal sections. It opened to sea-going vessels in 1822, but the limited size of the canal sections proved inadequate for general merchant shipping.

In the railway age, Inverness was an important commercial centre, and from 1854 it was a focus of railway communication. From a company amalgamation in 1865 the Highland Railway was dominant in that area. Agriculture and industry were active in the eastern side of the country, and railway development there was more vigorous. By contrast the western side of the area was backward and depressed. The first railway to attempt to reach the west coast was the Dingwall and Skye Railway, authorised in 1865 to build from Dingwall, north of Inverness, to Kyle of Lochalsh, close to the Isle of Skye. In fact the line opened only as far as Stromeferry on Loch Carron, a more difficult anchorage than Kyle of Lochalsh, in 1870. (The Highland Railway later absorbed the Dingwall and Skye Railway, and in 1897 it extended the line to Kyle of Lochalsh.)

An approach to the west coast further south was attempted by the Callander and Oban Railway, by extending from an existing branch line from Dunblane at Callander. Oban was already an important hub of communication with the islands and coastal towns. The construction of this line was also difficult, passing through sparsely populated rocky landscapes. There were serious money problems, but with the considerable support of the Caledonian Railway Oban was at last connected to the railway system in 1880.

Widespread attention was given to the depressed economic conditions in the West Highlands, and in the 1883 parliamentary session the Glasgow and North Western Railway was proposed. It was to leave the North British Railway at Maryhill (on the north west margin of Glasgow) and run by Loch Lomondside and Glencoe to Fort William and Inverness. This was an ambitious scheme, but the Highland Railway saw it as a threat to its supremacy in its area, and it opposed the scheme vigorously; the result was that the Glasgow and North Western Railway was rejected in Parliament.

It was a more modest proposal that actually provided the third link to the western coast: the West Highland Railway, which built a line from Craigendoran, opened in 1894 and extended to Banavie, on the Caledonian Canal, the following year. The West Highland Railway had intended to build their line to Roshven, on the Sound of Arisaig. Major difficulties had arisen with landowners' objections to the Roshven line, and the West Highland Railway contented itself with extending instead to Mallaig from Fort William; that section opened in 1901.

The West Highland Railway was sponsored by the North British Railway (NBR), and hostility flared up between the NBR and the Highland Railway. Both companies proposed lines along the Great Glen in 1893, before reviewing their intentions and withdrawing their schemes, and they agreed not to promote further similar schemes for a period of ten years, the so-called "ten year truce".

== Planning ==
The contractor and entrepreneur Charles Forman had been active in encouraging the various Great Glen schemes, and now he proposed the Invergarry and Fort Augustus Railway; it was to run to Fort Augustus from Spean Bridge on the West Highland Railway. In 1896 the board of the company comprised:

- Sir Donald Matheson KCB (chairman)
- Captain Edward Charles Ellice (deputy chairman)
- James Scarlett, 1st Baron Abinger
- Michael Bass, 1st Baron Burton
- John Charles Cuninghame 17th Laird of Craigends and Upper Foyers
- John Neilson of Glasgow,
- George Malcolm of Invergarry

Invergarry and Fort Augustus Railway Act 1896
- Act of Parliament
- Parliament of the United Kingdom
- Long title: An Act for making a Railway and Pier in the County of Inverness to be called the Invergarry and Fort Augustus Railway and for other purposes.
- Citation: 59 & 60 Vict. c. ccxl

Dates
- Royal assent: 14 August 1896

Invergarry and Fort Augustus Railway Act 1897
- Act of Parliament
- Parliament of the United Kingdom
- Long title: An Act to confer further powers upon the Invergarry and Fort Augustus Railway Company.
- Citation: 60 & 61 Vict. c. ccxvii

Dates
- Royal assent: 6 August 1897

Text of statute as originally enacted

The scheme attracted considerable local support and it obtained its authorising act of Parliament, the Invergarry and Fort Augustus Railway Act 1896 (59 & 60 Vict. c. ccxl) on 14 August 1896. The population of Fort Augustus was less than 500, and it was widely assumed that the line was a speculative bid to reach Inverness.

== Construction ==
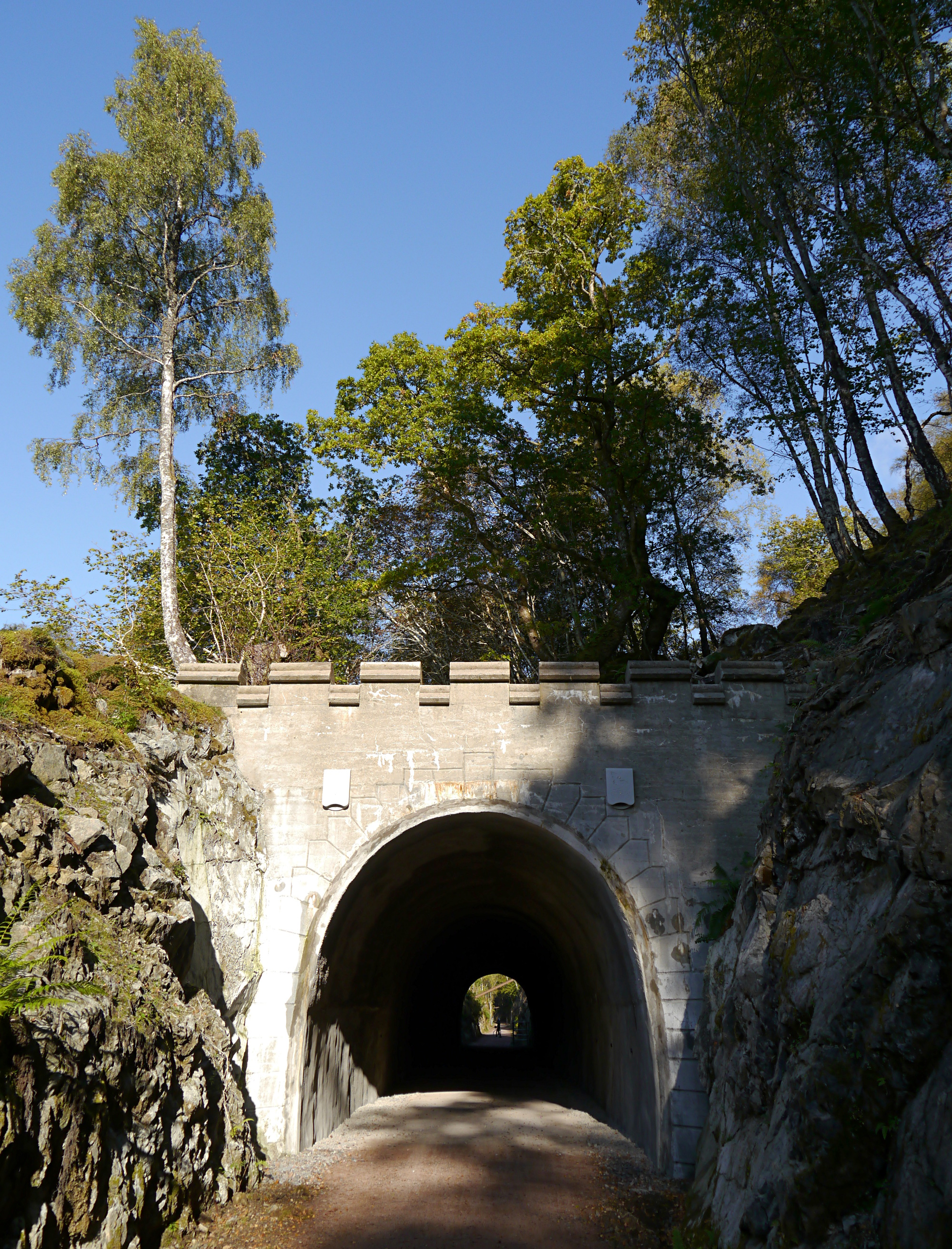
67 yards (61 m) tunnel near Loch Oich

Formans and McCall were appointed engineers of the railway, and James Young of Glasgow was the contractor. Construction started on 2 March 1897 when Mrs Margaret Ellice of Invergarry, wife of Captain Edward Ellice, deputy chairman of the company, cut the first turf. but the process was very slow, in part due to an exceptionally high standard of specification for the architectural and engineering assets. Elaborate stations with spacious goods yards were provided. Invergarry had four goods sidings and separate loading banks for cattle and goods.

In April 1900 the directors paid a visit of inspection and travelled over the whole length of the line, which was reported as practically completed.

The line was 23 miles 13 chains (37.3 km) in length to Fort Augustus station; the pier extension was 73 chains (4,800 ft; 1,500 m). The first mile and last mile of the railway absorbed around one third of the capital expenditure. From the west end of Spean Bridge the line passed along the banks of the River Spean and through a gorge, which required four lattice spans at a maximum height above the river of 76 feet (23 m), one of 120 feet (37 m), two of 60 feet (18 m) and one of 50 feet (15 m). After a 4 miles (6.4 km) stretch through wooded countryside, it crossed the river Gloy on a three-span lattice girder bridge of two 50 feet (15 m) spans and one 100 feet (30 m) span. The line then climbed to the summit of 370 feet (110 m) at Letterfinlay. The descent to the Great Glen included the 67 yards (61 m) Oich tunnel, and a four-span Calder Burn viaduct to reach Aberchalder. The final stretch followed the shoreline of Loch Uanagan to Fort Augustus town station. From there it crossed the Caledonian Canal on a swing bridge to the pier station on Loch Ness. The line had a ruling gradient of 1 in 66 and was single throughout, although land had been acquired for double track. There were passing loops at all the stations, which were:

- Spean Bridge (West Highland Railway station)
- Gairlochy
- Invergloy; opened June 1904
- Letterfinlay: crossing place only; never brought into use and subsequently dismantled
- Invergarry
- Aberchalder
- Fort Augustus, with three platform faces
- Fort Augustus Pier; passenger service in summer only; closed 1 October 1906.

Invergarry and Fort Augustus Railway Order Confirmation Act 1901
- Act of Parliament
- Parliament of the United Kingdom
- Long title: An Act to confirm a Provisional Order under the Private Legislation Procedure (Scotland) Act 1899 relating to the Invergarry and Fort Augustus Railway.
- Citation: 1 Edw. 7. c. clxii

Dates
- Royal assent: 26 July 1901

Other legislation
- Relates to: Private Legislation Procedure (Scotland) Act 1899

Highland and Invergarry and Fort Augustus Railways Act 1903
- Act of Parliament
- Parliament of the United Kingdom
- Long title: An Act to confirm an agreement between the Highland Railway Company and the Invergarry and Fort Augustus Railway Company to enable the Highland Railway Company to erect and maintain a hotel at Dornoch to apply their capital thereto and for other purposes.
- Citation: 3 Edw. 7. c. cxii

Dates
- Royal assent: 21 July 1903

Text of statute as originally enacted

The line had cost £344,000 (equivalent to £47,200,000 in 2023) to construct, or around £14,300 per mile. Michael Bass, 1st Baron Burton had provided £163,000 of the capital required for construction. The line was ready for opening in 1901, but the company had run out of money and had none to purchase locomotives, coaches and wagons. The company approached the North British Railway to operate the line for them. The Highland Railway objected to this and the matter was investigated by parliamentary authorities. This led to a lengthy delay in agreeing terms of operation. The North British Railway required 60% of the revenue with a minimum of £3,000 each year (equivalent to £411,400 in 2023). The Highland Railway agreed to operate it at £2,000 per half year. The Invergarry and Fort Augustus Railway company had to submit a private bill to Parliament to confirm the working arrangement, and this was passed as the Highland and Invergarry and Fort Augustus Railways Act 1903 (3 Edw. 7. c. cxii) on 30 June 1903.

== Operations ==
=== Opening ===
On 14 July 1903 Colonel John Wallace Pringle inspected the railway on behalf of the Board of Trade and declared it open for traffic. The line opened to passengers on 22 July 1903. The formal ceremony was performed at Spean Bridge by Mrs Eliza Stewart Ellice, of Invergarry, who had cut the first turf in 1897. She was presented with a gold whistle. A large party of invited guests travelled by train to Fort Augustus where they were entertained by William Whitelaw, chairman of the Highland Railway Company, to luncheon at the Lovat Arms Hotel.

The company appointed Hugh Fraser as stationmaster at Fort Augustus, James Morrison at Invergarry and Donald Macdonald to Gairlochy.

The building of the line was the signal for a resumption of the fight for a railway along the Great Glen: the I&FAR itself as well as the Highland Railway and the North British Railway proposed lines linking to Inverness, but the Highland Railway gained the ascendency. However it was excluded in the Commons from running powers over the I&FAR, and the Highland Railway Bill was subsequently thrown out in the Lords.

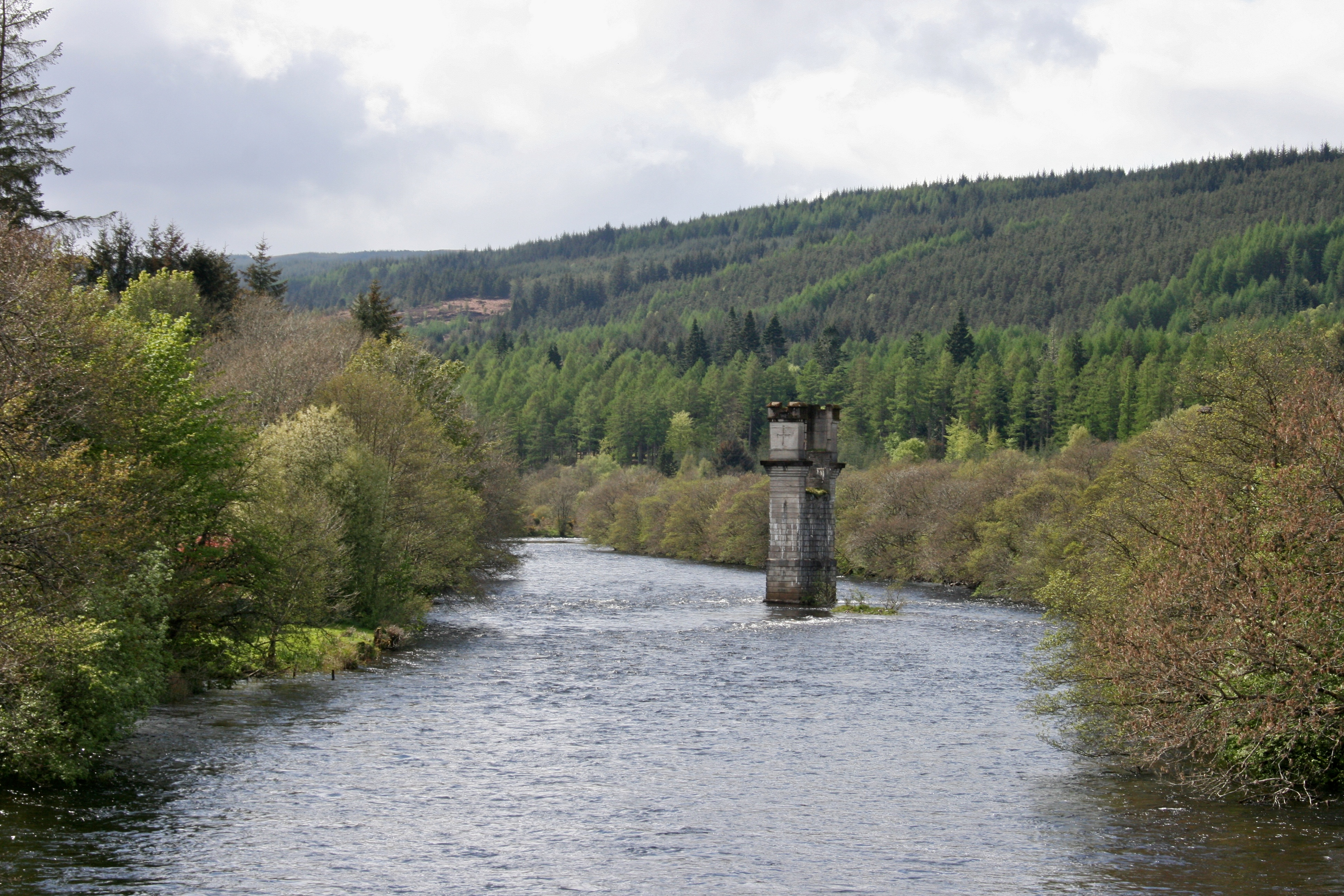
Remaining pier of the old railway bridge over the River Oich.

By section 32 of the Invergarry and Fort Augustus Railway Act 1896 (59 & 60 Vict. c. ccxl), the railway was, for the benefit of the owners of the Glengarry estate, required to construct a permanent station at within 2 furlongs (400 m) of the South-West end of Loch Oich, "to be called Invergarry Station, for passengers, animals and goods, with separate waiting-rooms for ladies and gentlemen and other usual and necessary accommodation therein" and to "stop all ordinary trains other than express or special or excursion trains at such station daily for the purpose of taking up and setting down traffic of any kind."

=== Highland Railway ===
A 4-4-0 tank engine, no 52 was generally used as the motive power during the Highland Railway period. There were four trains each way daily. In September 1905, King Edward VII travelled over the line from Spean Bridge to Invergarry with George Cadogan, 5th Earl Cadogan and Countess Cadogan.

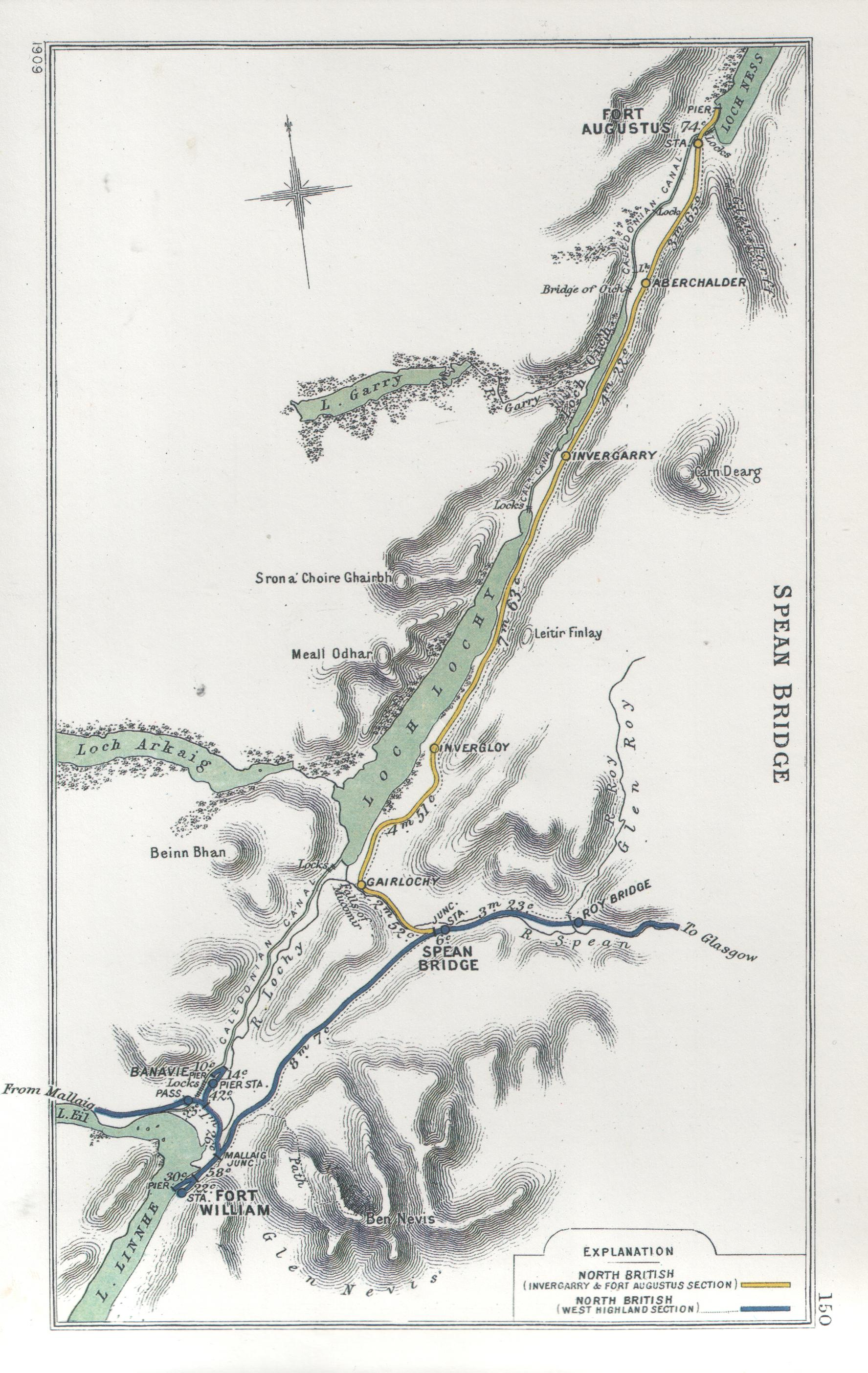
A 1909 Railway Clearing House map showing the Invergarry and Fort Augustus Railway, with a portion of the West Highland Railway

The Fort Augustus Pier station was on Loch Ness and tourist traffic was contemplated. However the dominant steamer operator on the loch, David MacBrayne, declined to use the railway pier and it saw very little use. The extension to the pier involved a hand-operated swing bridge over the Caledonian Canal and a viaduct over the River Oich. Passenger traffic on the pier extension was suspended from 1 October 1906, (Note: In Forgotten Railways page 202 Thomas says "On 30th September 1907 the I&FAR closed its pier and station at Fort Augustus, and abandoned the expensive and little-used approach. In the following year the Highland withdrew its trains and the NB moved in to work the line..." The date 30 September 1906 is used by other authorities (Vallance, Clinker and Lambert; Quick) and in any case the NBR took over in 1907, not 1908. It was of course the Pier station, not Fort Augustus station that was closed to passengers. The approach line and Pier station remained in use for goods purposes for some years.) although occasional goods trains ran until July 1924 when the extension was finally closed permanently.

In March 1906 many areas of the western Highlands experienced exceptional rainfall and flooding. Describing the dislocation to railways in the Lochaber area the Scotsman reported

The most serious damage reported, however, occurred on the Invergarry and Fort-Augustus Railway, in the neighbourhood of Letterfinlay, where two large sections of the line have been washed away by the enormous rush of water down the hillside. In consequence of this mishap, no traffic occurred over the line on Saturday.

The line was heavily loss-making, due to the sparse population and the availability of a direct alternative in the steamers on the parallel Caledonian Canal. The Highland Railway decided to cut its losses: confident that its supremacy at Inverness was no longer at risk, it withdrew its trains from 1 May 1907.

The abandonment of the Invergarry and Fort-Augustus Railway by the Highland Railway Company will surprise no-one who knows the conditions under which that line is at present worked. The railway ought really to be a branch and feeder of the West Highland Railway. Beginning at Spean Bridge on the latter system it is laid through a beautiful but sparsely-populated country to Fort-Augustus, midway between Inverness and Fort-William. For a considerable part of the way it runs alongside the chain of lochs forming the Caledonian Canal, and is thus in direct competition to the steamboat traffic on the Canal. Fort-Augustus is a small town of very inconsiderable importance except as a tourist centre, and none of the other villages tapped by the line is large or busy.

=== North British Railway ===
The North British Railway (NBR) took over on 1 May 1907; there was a three-year agreement to work the line for 60% of gross receipts, with a minimum take of £2,000. The NBR operated two trains each way daily, but increased this to four in the summer.

The North British Railway proposed to close the line down from 31 January 1911, but the wealthy sponsors of the I&FAR persuaded them to persevere for one more summer, which they did. The financial situation did not improve and the NBR withdrew its trains from 31 October 1911. (Note: Ross has this in reverse in The North British Railway: he says that the Invergarry and Fort Augustus Railway "directors had proposed to close [their line] down from 31 January 1911, rather than share half the company's deficit with the North British, but the NBR persuaded them to hold off." It is difficult to follow how that can be accurate.)

The line was now closed, and for the time being it avoided the operating costs that led to the huge losses, while the company contented itself with taking in small sums of non-railway income. A huge movement of public opinion now took place urging retention of the line, notwithstanding the extremely low usage of it when it was operating. A request for government support was put forward, though without success, and for the time being the line remained closed.

In 1912 the NBR offered to purchase the line for £22,500 (equivalent to £2,810,000 in 2023) but the Invergarry and Fort Augustus Railway Company refused the sale. The company offered the railway for sale in December 1912, but were taken to the Court of Session by Lochaber District Committee, Aird District Committee, the trustee of Edward Ellice and Major Bailey of Invergarry on 5 February 1913 to prevent the assets being sold for scrap. This was referred to the First Division of the Court of Session in March 1913 who found in favour of the complainants and prevented the railway from being sold.

North British Railway (Invergarry and Fort Augustus Railway Vesting) Order Confirmation Act 1914
- Act of Parliament
- Parliament of the United Kingdom
- Long title: An Act to confirm a Provisional Order under the Private Legislation Procedure (Scotland) Act 1899 relating to North British Railway (Invergarry and Fort Augustus Railway Vesting).
- Citation: 4 & 5 Geo. 5. c. cxciii

Dates
- Royal assent: 28 August 1914

Other legislation
- Relates to: Private Legislation Procedure (Scotland) Act 1899

Text of statute as originally enacted

In 1913 Inverness-shire County Council offered to contribute an additional £5,000 and the sale was agreed at £27,500; the transfer was authorised by the North British Railway (Invergarry and Fort Augustus Railway Vesting) Order Confirmation Act 1914 (4 & 5 Geo. 5. c. cxciii) of 28 August 1914.

The NBR resumed working the line on 1 August 1913, as contractors to the I&FAR for the time being; formal transfer to the North British Railway took place on 30 August 1914. There were three trains daily in summer and two in winter. Through trains to and from Fort William were later operated.

The railway suffered two landslides in 1916 which affected services badly. At the end of January, floods caused a landslide resulting in around 1,000 tons of debris blocking several hundred yards of line just east of Invergarry station. In October more heavy rain caused flooding which suspended traffic on the line.

On 2 August 1924, another cloudburst caused a landslide a mile north of Invergarry and a train from Fort Augustus ran into the debris on the line and derailed.

A writer for The Railway Magazine had a run on the line in 1940:

Passenger and parcels traffic on the Fort Augustus branch was suspended in November, 1933, and there is now only one weekly coal and petrol train, leaving Spean Bridge at 10.30 a.m. on Saturdays, all other traffic being dealt with by L.N.E.R. motor lorries and David McBrayne’s buses and steamers, the latter in summer only. The locomotive working the branch is an ex-North British 0-6-0 goods, No. 9663, which runs out and home light from Fort William, and makes up its train at Spean Bridge; the latter usually consists of twelve to sixteen wagons and a brake... The branch presents a rather neglected appearance, for several sidings, passing loops, footbridges, signal boxes, and all signalling except for a fixed distant just outside Spean Bridge, have been removed. Leaving Spean Bridge I travelled in the brake, having, in addition to the guard, a bicycle, two passengers, some newspapers, three or four bags of coal and a large consignment of cakes, as companions. We stopped at Gairlochy. the first station out, where the guard’s wife is station-mistress, and I was very interested to see the way in which all of the station buildings have been converted into a camping hostel, similar to the camping coaches, but with fireplaces telephone, water laid on, and "Mrs. Guard” to minister to one’s wants. Similar arrangements have been made at Invergarry and Fort Augustus, the charge averaging £2 to £3 per person per week.

Leaving Gairlochy we passed Invergloy platform, also two sidings put in for timber traffic during the 1914-1919 war, and pulled up at Invergarry. A stationmaster-clerk is in charge here and a similar arrangement obtains at Fort Augustus... A short distance ahead a tunnel is passed, and speed rose to 35 or 40 m.p.h... Passing Aberchalder, the station buildings of which are now let to a fruit merchant, about 20 min. journey brought us to Fort Augustus. Here all the passenger tracks have been removed, except a through line which ran down to the Pier station (closed in 1907). ¾ mile further on a swing-bridge over the Caledonian Canal and a viaduct still remain, together with a few hundred yards of track, but when the Glasgow-Inverness road was reconstructed in 1934-1936 part of an embankment of the pier extension was removed completely and the rails are thus severed. The two-road engine shed is derelict, but the turntable is still in use by the engineer’s Department Ro Railer, which comes up from Fort William occasionally... About 12.15 p.m. the train commences its return journey, which has no stops, save one, at Gairlochy, to pick up the guard's dinner, and Spean Bridge is reached about 1.30 p.m. Gairlochy, Invergarry, and Fort Augustus stations have recently been repainted and numbers of men were at work renovating several bridges: a sleeping van was stationed at Aberchalder for them.

=== Closure ===
Passenger trains continued until 1 December 1933, when the very poor patronage caused the London and North Eastern Railway (LNER, as successor to the North British Railway) to close the service. Weekly coal trains continued running until they were withdrawn and the line closed on 31 December 1946. The last train to run on the line was on 31 December 1946 with 18 wagons loaded with timber.

After closure, Fort Augustus station was occupied by a company constructing a hydro-electric power scheme, and on 30 October 1950 the station building was badly damaged by fire.

== Preservation ==
Some of the line today has been built over by roads and holiday parks, although it mostly survives in a reasonably good, if overgrown, condition. The many bridges and single tunnel are in particularly good condition. Some of the line along Loch Oich has been incorporated into the Great Glen Way, and a further section is now part of National Cycle Route 78.

A restoration project is, as of 2016, under way at Invergarry Station, the last remaining station that is largely intact. The Invergarry Station Preservation Society plan to create a static museum, with a short length of track and several freight wagons.

In March 2015, 480 feet (150 m) of track was laid in platform 1. Work then commenced in constructing the replica signal cabin on the platform. The project is now known as the Invergarry & Fort Augustus Railway Museum. The track has been extended a quarter of a mile to the west and in 2021 a spur will cross the cycle track giving access to the sidings.
