= Loch Arkaig =

Lake in Lochaber, Scotland

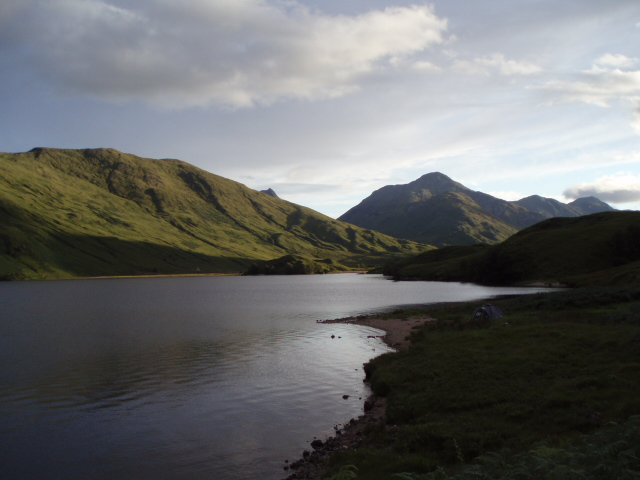
- Sun setting over the western hills

- Location within Scotland
- Location: Lochaber, Scotland
- Coordinates: 56.966°N 5.134°W
- Primary inflows: Dessarry, Pean River
- Primary outflows: River Arkaig
- Basin countries: United Kingdom
- Max. length: 12 mi (19 km)
- Surface area: 16 km^{2} (6.2 sq mi)
- Max. depth: 300 ft (91 m)
- Water volume: 0.75 km^{3} (0.18 cu mi)
- Surface elevation: 140 ft (43 m)
- Islands: 2

Loch Arkaig (Scottish Gaelic: Loch Airceig) is a body of freshwater in Lochaber, Scotland, to the west of the Great Glen. It is approximately 12 miles (19 kilometres) in length and lies 140 feet (43 metres) above sea level, and the maximum depth is around 300 feet (90 metres). The loch is among the last remaining fragments of the Caledonian pinewood, which is native to the UK.

The main tributaries are the Dessarry and the Pean, which flow through the glens of the same names, falling into the loch at the extreme west end, by the settlement of Strathan. The mountains of Lochaber lie to the north, and the Forest of Locheil to the south. The outflow is through the River Arkaig at the extreme southeast of the loch, which flows eastwards 1 3/8 miles (2.2 kilometres) to Loch Lochy, passing Achnacarry.

Two small islands lie at the eastern end of the loch, the larger of which, Island Columbkill, or Eilean Loch Airceig, is the site of a ruined chapel dedicated to St Columba which is the former burial ground of the Camerons of Locheil. A road from the Great Glen follows the north shore of the loch to Strathan where paths lead on to Knoydart, Glenfinnan and Loch Morar.

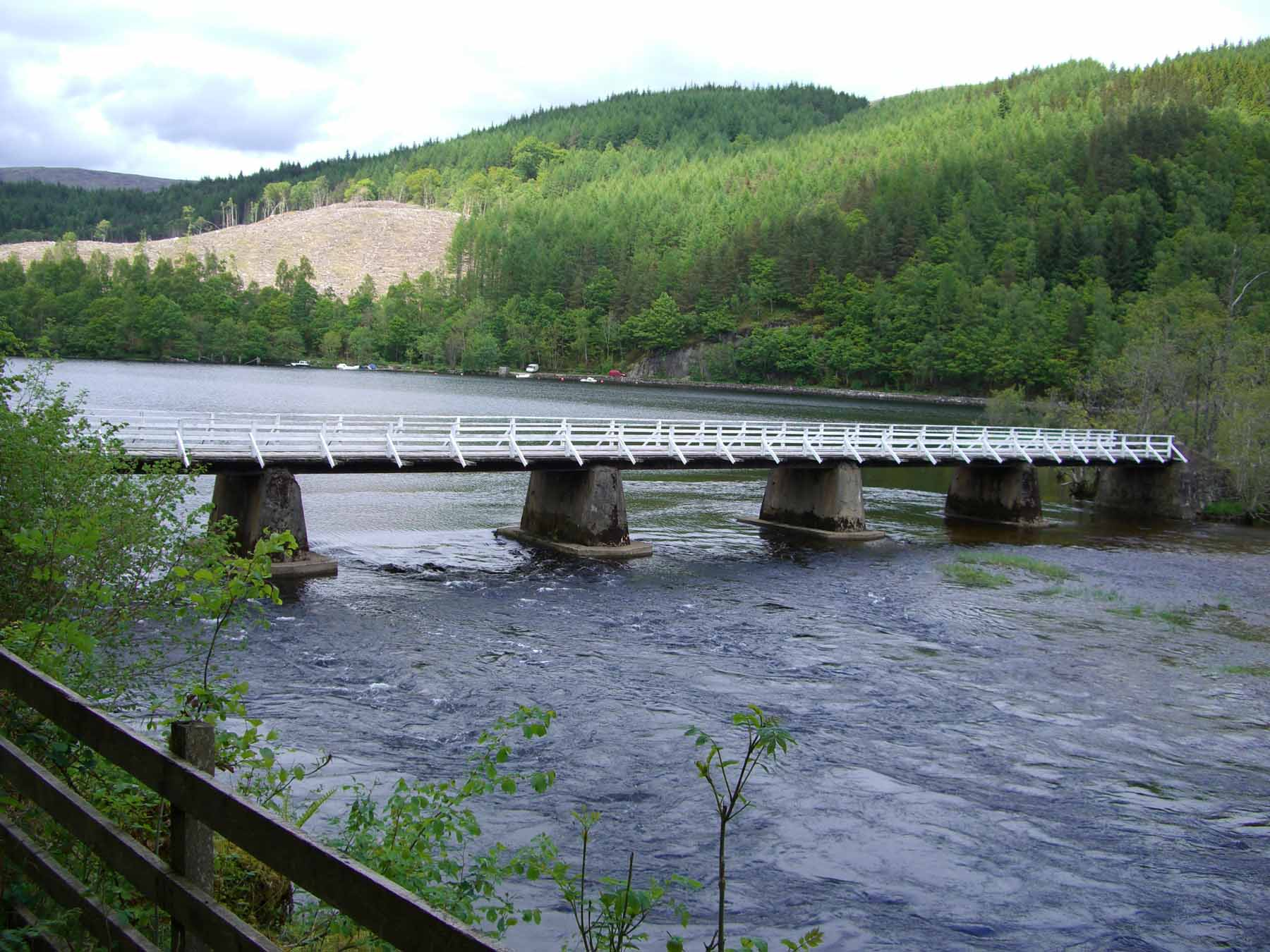
The River Arkaig flows from the eastern end of Loch Arkaig.

In 1746, Jacobite funds were said to have been hidden here (see Loch Arkaig treasure).

In common with a number of other Scottish lochs, Loch Arkaig was at one time supposed to be the home of a water horse. James Harris, 3rd Earl of Malmesbury and twice foreign minister during Queen Victoria's reign, recorded in his Memoirs of an Ex-Minister:

"October 3rd, 1857. This morning my stalker and his boy gave me an account of a mysterious creature, which they say exists in Loch Arkaig, and which they call the Lake-Horse. It is the same animal of which one has occasionally read accounts in newspapers as having been seen in the Highland lochs, and of the existence of which in Loch Assynt the late Lord Ellesmere wrote an interesting article, but hitherto the story has always been looked upon as fabulous. I am now, however, nearly persuaded of its truth. My stalker, John Stuart, at Achnacarry, has seen it twice, and both times at sunrise on a bright sunny day, when there was not a ripple on the water. The creature was basking on the surface; he only saw the head and hind quarters, proving that its back was hollow, which is not the shape of any fish or of a seal. Its head resembled that of a horse.... The Highlanders are very superstitious about this creature. They are convinced that there is never more than one in existence at the same time, and I believe they think it has something diabolical in its nature, for when I said I wished I could get within shot of it, my stalker observed very gravely: 'Perhaps your Lordship's gun would miss fire.'"
