= Loch Lochy =

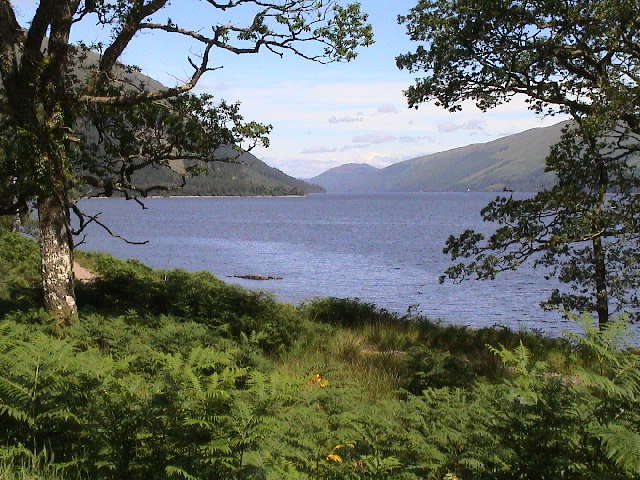
- View from the A82

- Location within Highland
- Location: Lochaber, Highland, Scotland
- Coordinates: 56°58′07″N 4°54′38″W
- Type: freshwater loch
- Primary inflows: River Arkaig
- Primary outflows: River Lochy
- Basin countries: United Kingdom
- Max. length: 16 km (9.9 mi)
- Surface area: 16 km^{2} (6.2 sq mi)
- Average depth: 70 m (230 ft)
- Max. depth: 162 m (531 ft)
- Water volume: 1.1 km^{3} (0.26 cu mi)
- Surface elevation: 94 ft (29 m)
- Settlements: Close to Nevis range mountains experience 0.7 km

Loch Lochy (Scottish Gaelic: Loch Lòchaidh) is a large freshwater loch in Lochaber, Highland, Scotland. With a mean depth of 70 m (230 ft), it is the fourth-deepest loch of Scotland.

== Geography ==
Located 16 km (10 mi) southwest of Loch Ness along the Great Glen, the loch is over 15 km (9 mi) long with an average width of about 1 km (5/8 mi). The River Lochy flows from its southwestern end while the Caledonian Canal links its northeastern extent to Loch Oich.

Loch Lochy should not be confused with Loch Loch, which lies to the east of Beinn a' Ghlò.

== History ==
The Battle of the Shirts was fought at its northern end near Laggan in July 1544, between Clan Donald and Clan Fraser.

The Stand-off at the Fords of Arkaig in September 1665 ended a 360-year feud between the Camerons and the Chattan Confederation. It took place at Achnacarry, on the isthmus between Loch Lochy and Loch Arkaig.

Folklore tales mention a supernatural being called the River Horse which was said to emerge from the lake and assume a horse's shape before feeding on the loch's banks. The River Horse was also known as the Lord of the Lake and the Water King and would overturn boats and "entice mares from their pastures". Another tradition was that of the River Bull, "a gentle, harmless creature", who would "emerge from the lake into the pasture of cows".

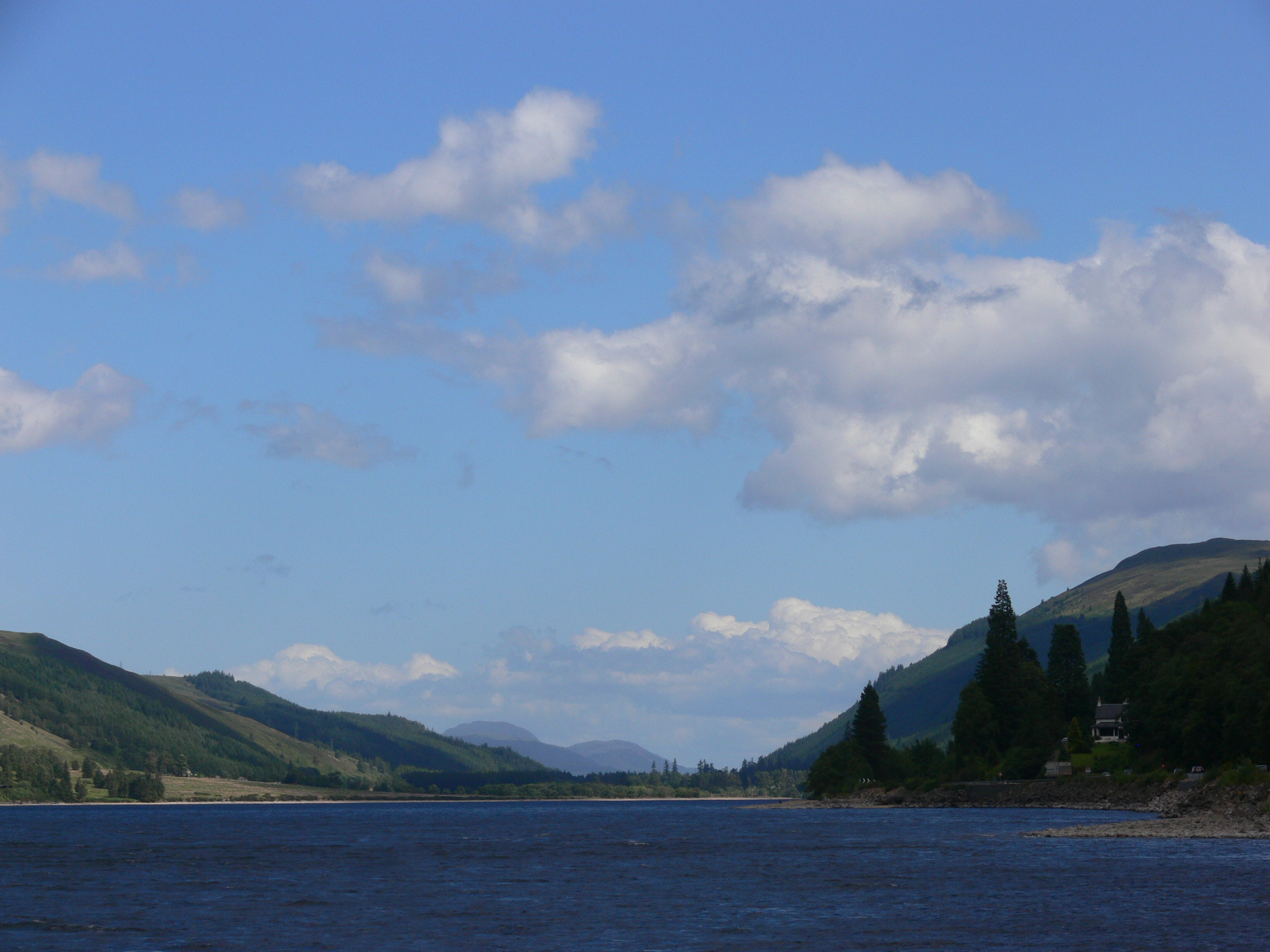
View over Loch Lochy
