= Loch Oich =

- Loch Obhaich
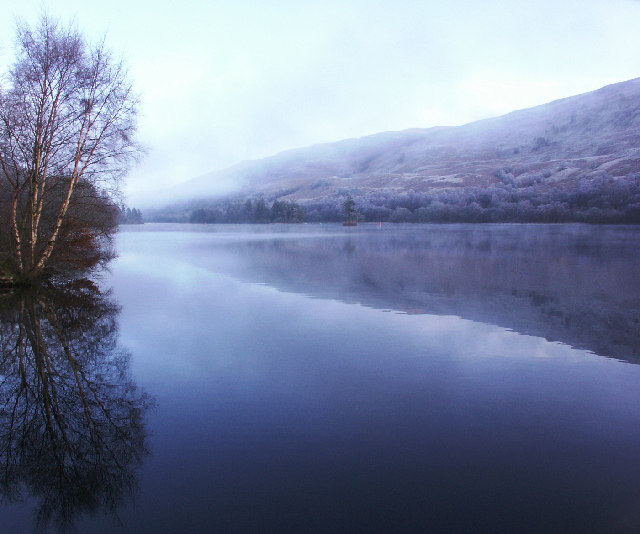

- Location within Highland
- Location: Highlands of Scotland
- Coordinates: 57°4′N 4°47′W
- Type: freshwater loch
- Basin countries: United Kingdom
- Max. length: 6.5 km (4 mi)
- Max. width: 1 km (0.62 mi)
- Max. depth: 47 m (154 ft)
- Surface elevation: 32 m (106 ft)

Loch Oich (/ˌlɒx ˈɔɪx/; Scottish Gaelic: Loch Obhaich) is a freshwater loch in the Highlands of Scotland which forms part of the Caledonian Canal, of which it is the highest point. This narrow loch lies between Loch Ness (to the north-east) and Loch Lochy (to the south-west) in the Great Glen. It is fed by the River Garry (from Loch Garry) from the west, and feeds the River Oich from its northern end. The Laggan locks separate it from Loch Lochy.

The Loch Oich wildlife is rich with a wide variety of fish, amphibians, reptiles, birds and mammals.

Every autumn the Atlantic salmon (Salmo salar) migrates from the sea using Loch Oich, Loch Lochy and Loch Ness as their spawning nests.

Thomas Telford artificially raised the level of the loch by many feet to provide a navigable channel for the Caledonian Canal.

SS Gairlochy from SS Gondolier, Loch Oich, Caledonian Canal 1905

== Well of the Seven Heads ==
The tall needle-like monument on the banks of Loch Oich at the side of the A82 was erected in 1812 by Alexander Ranaldson Macdonell to commemorate the Keppoch murders (Scottish Gaelic: Murt na Ceapaich). It is topped by a sculpture of a hand holding a dagger and seven severed heads. The monument bears an inscription in Gaelic, English, French and Latin that outlines "the ample and summary vengence which, upon the orders of the Lord MacDonnell and Aross, overtook the perpetrators of the foul murder of the Keppoch family, a branch of the powerful and illustrious clan of which his lordship was the Chief". It details how the heads of the seven murderers were cut off with a knife, washed in the nearby burn and then presented at the feet of the MacDonnell chieftain in the nearby Invergarry Castle. The monument was moved a few yards from its original position in 1930 when the road was reconstructed.
