= Great Glen =

Scottish valley along geological fault line

Coordinates: 57.30°N 4.45°W

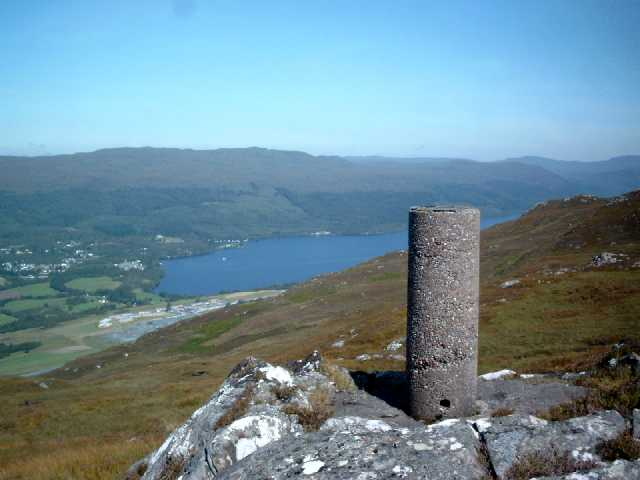
Great Glen Project Station M. This triangulation pillar was one of around sixteen built for a special survey of the Great Glen in the 1970s.

The Great Glen (Scottish Gaelic: An Gleann Mòr [an ˈklaun̪ˠ ˈmoːɾ]), also known as Glen Albyn (from the Gaelic Gleann Albainn "Glen of Scotland" [ˈklaun̪ˠ ˈaɫ̪apən]) or Glen More (from the Gaelic Gleann Mòr "Big/Great Glen"), is a glen in Scotland running for 62 miles (100 km) from Inverness on the edge of the Moray Firth, in an approximately straight line to Fort William at the head of Loch Linnhe. It follows a geological fault known as the Great Glen Fault, and bisects the Scottish Highlands into the Grampian Mountains to the southeast and the Northwest Highlands to the northwest.

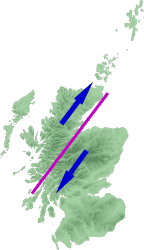
The Great Glen Fault

The glen is a natural travelling route in the Highlands of Scotland, which is used by both the Caledonian Canal and the A82 road, which link the city of Inverness on the northeast coast with Fort William on the west coast. The Invergarry and Fort Augustus Railway was built in 1896 from the southern end of the glen to the southern end of Loch Ness, but was never extended to Inverness. The railway closed in 1947. In 2002, the Great Glen Way was opened. A long-distance route for cyclists, canoeists, and walkers, it consists of a series of footpaths, forestry tracks, canal paths and occasional stretches of road linking Fort William to Inverness.

The glen's strategic importance in controlling the Highland Scottish clans, particularly around the time of the Jacobite risings of the 18th century, is recognised by the presence of the towns of Fort William in the south, Fort Augustus in the middle of the glen, and Fort George, just to the northeast of Inverness.

Much of the glen is taken up with a series of lochs, with rivers connecting them. The Caledonian Canal also uses the lochs as part of the route, but the rivers are not navigable. From northeast to southwest, the natural water features along the Great Glen are:

- River Ness (Abhainn Nis)
- Loch Dochfour (Loch Dabhach Phuir)
- Loch Ness (Loch Nis)
- River Oich (Abhainn Omhaich)
- Loch Oich (Loch Omhaich)
- Loch Lochy (Loch Lochaidh)
- River Lochy (Abhainn Lochaidh)
- Loch Linnhe (An Linne Dhubh)

The watershed lies between Loch Oich and Loch Lochy. Loch Linnhe to the south of Fort William is a sea loch into which both the River Lochy and Caledonian Canal emerge. At the north end, the River Ness empties into the Beauly Firth at the point where it meets the Moray Firth.

== Seismic activity ==
Although earthquakes in the vicinity of the Great Glen Fault tend to be minor, seismic activity is a consideration in the design of infrastructure. For example, the Kessock Bridge includes seismic buffers.
