= Boleskine House =

Manor on the south-east side of Loch Ness in the Scottish Highlands

Coordinates: 57.2653°N 4.4747°W

Boleskine House Taigh Both Fhleisginn (in Scottish Gaelic)
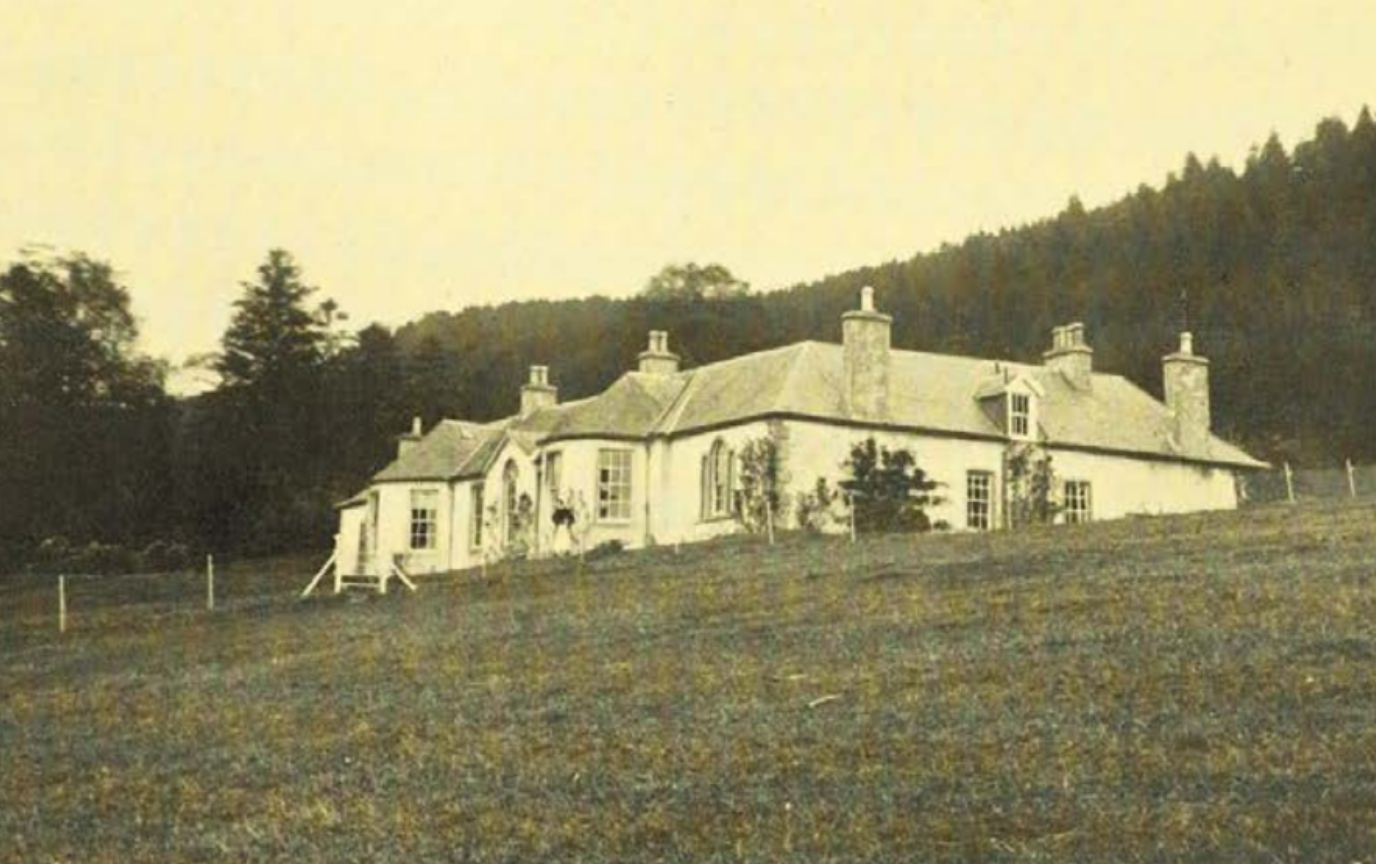
- Boleskine House in 1912

General information
- Architectural style: Manor house
- Location: Foyers, Scotland
- Completed: c.1760

Boleskine House (Scottish Gaelic: Taigh Both Fhleisginn) is a manor on the south-east side of Loch Ness in the Scottish Highlands. It is notable for having been the home of author and occultist Aleister Crowley, and Led Zeppelin guitarist and producer Jimmy Page. It suffered significant fire damage in December 2015 and again in July 2019. The house's restoration and construction work began in December 2019. The Boleskine House Foundation SCIO took over ownership of one part of the estate in 2019 in order to manage restoration efforts on the house. The restoration was completed and the house re-opened to the public in April 2026.

== Background ==
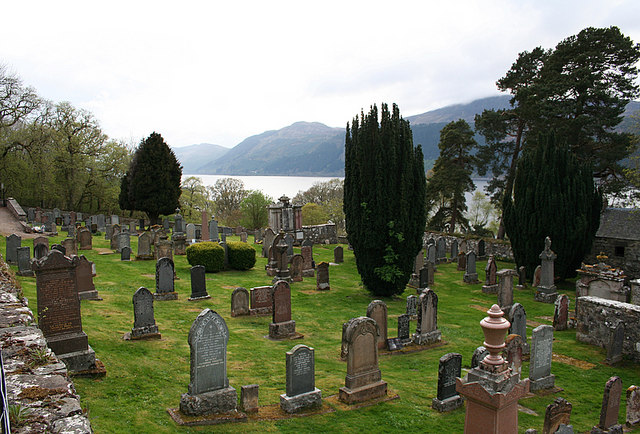
Boleskine Cemetery in 2007.

Boleskine House is 21 miles (34 km) south of Inverness, on the opposite side of Loch Ness from the Meall Fuar-mhonaidh, and halfway between the villages of Foyers and Inverfarigaig.

The area has a history of strange happenings long before Aleister Crowley moved in. The parish of Boleskine was formed in the 13th Century. A Kirk and graveyard were built in the parish around this time. A succession of Ministers ran Boleskine Parish and would travel the area on horseback or on foot in all weather conditions. Minister Thomas Houston (1648–1705) was said to have had the task of hastily laying animated corpses back in their graves after a devious local wizard had raised the dead in Boleskine graveyard.

== History ==
=== Construction and expansion (1760-1830) ===
Boleskine House was built on the site of the kirk, which, according to legend, caught fire during congregation and killed everyone inside. The house was constructed in the 1760s by Colonel Archibald Fraser as a hunting lodge. Colonel Archibald Fraser apparently chose the site specifically to irritate distant cousin, Simon Fraser, 8th Laird of Foyers in retribution for his support of political rival Charles Grant during the 1802 Inverness-shire parliamentary election, Lord Foyers land surrounded the site of Boleskine.

The original hunting lodge was expanded continuously by the Fraser family until c. 1830. All the rooms were situated on one floor, with 4 bedrooms, a kitchen, servant's "attic bedroom" (above kitchen), lounge, drawing room, and a library. There is a tunnel linking the house to the graveyard.

=== Aleister Crowley's ownership (1899–1913) ===
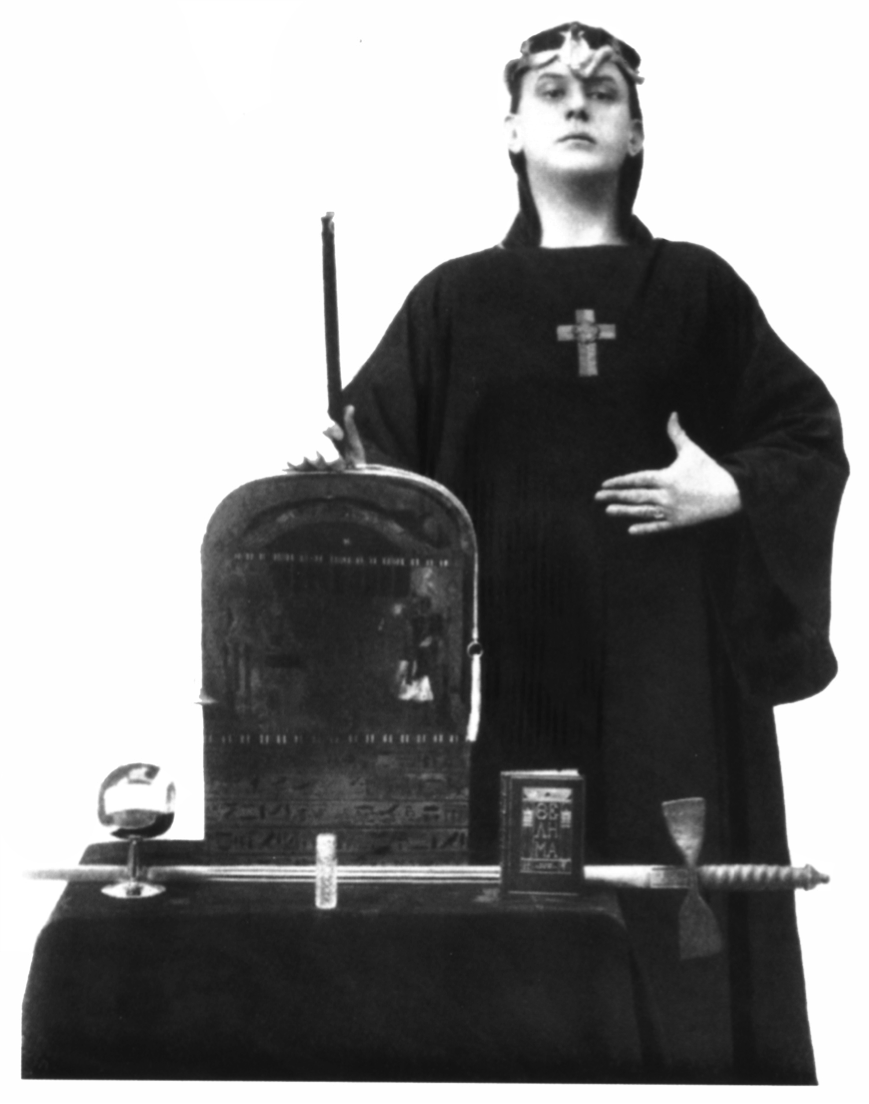
Crowley in ceremonial garb, 1912.

Crowley purchased Boleskine House from the Fraser family in 1899. The House at that time was known as the Manor of Boleskine and Abertarff after the name of the local parish. Crowley believed the location was ideal to sequester himself to perform a series of operations known as the Sacred Magic of Abramelin the Mage, taken from a grimoire called The Book of Abramelin.

According to Crowley, in his book The Confessions of Aleister Crowley, in order to perform the operations "the first essential is a house in a more or less secluded situation. There should be a door opening to the north from the room of which you make your oratory. Outside this door, you construct a terrace covered with fine river sand. This ends in a 'lodge' where the spirits may congregate."

The purpose of this ritual is to invoke one's Guardian Angel.

It requires at least 6 months of preparation, celibacy, and abstinence from alcohol. However, it also includes the summoning of the 12 Kings and Dukes of Hell, to bind them and remove their negative influences from the magician's life. Whilst Crowley was in the process of performing the lengthy ritual, he was called to Paris by the leader of the Golden Dawn. According to legend, he never banished the demons he had summoned, leading to strange happenings occurring in and around Boleskine House.

Crowley became infamous for stories of conducting black magic and various other rituals while residing at the house; one of his pseudonyms was "Lord Boleskine". His lodge keeper, Hugh Gillies, suffered a number of personal tragedies, including the loss of two children. Crowley later claimed that his experiments with black magic had simply gotten out of hand.

Crowley described the house as a "long low building. I set apart the south-western half for my work. The largest room has a bow window and here I made my door and constructed the terrace and lodge. Inside the room I set up my oratory proper. This was a wooden structure, lined in part with the big mirrors which I brought from London."

He left the property in 1913, moving to a modest cottage in Dennyloanhead near Falkirk.

=== 1913–1970 ===
After the Second World War the house was owned by a Major Edward Grant. On 9 November 1960, it was reported that Major Grant had committed suicide in Crowley's bedroom with a shotgun.

After this a newly married couple moved into the house. The wife was blind, and after a month the man walked out, leaving the woman wandering around unable to see. In 1969, Kenneth Anger, an experimental filmmaker with an interest in the occult, learned that the house was on the market and rented it for a few months. When Jimmy Page heard about this, he bought the house in 1970.

=== Jimmy Page's ownership (1970–1992) ===
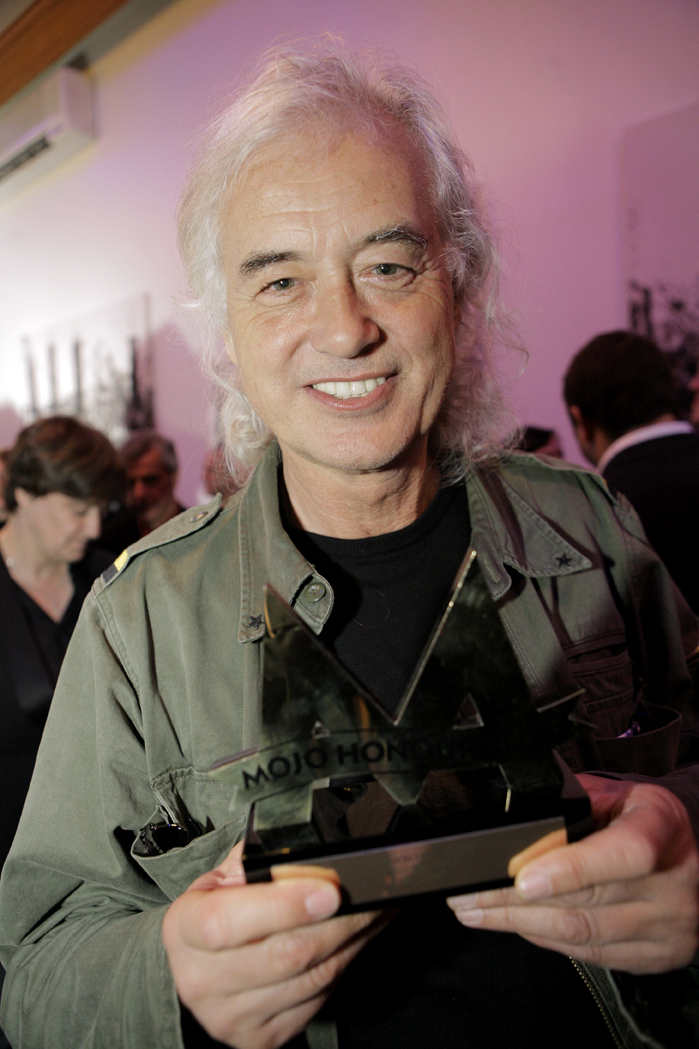
Jimmy Page in 2008.

Jimmy Page was a collector of Crowley memorabilia who "had read a lot of Crowley and ... was fascinated by his ideas". At the time Page bought the house it was in a state of decay, but he felt it would be a good atmosphere in which to write songs. However, after arranging for the house to be restored he spent little time at Boleskine, leaving things in the care of his friend Malcolm Dent (1944–2011).

When asked why he was chosen, Dent explained "Jimmy Page caught me at a time in my life when I wasn't doing a great deal and asked me to come up and run the place. I never did establish why he fixed on me." When Dent moved into the house "it was a wreck ... It had been more or less abandoned. There'd been at least one fire there, parts of the building were missing and it had been badly patched up. The grounds, which at one time had been very nicely laid out [,] were gone to hell".

Although Dent was a sceptic of the paranormal, he soon started to experience strange occurrences. After a few weeks, he heard strange rumblings from the hallway which stopped when he investigated, but resumed after he closed the bedroom door. After researching the house, he discovered the rumbling in the hall was supposedly the head of Lord Lovat, even though he was executed in London. Dent explains "above Boleskine there's a place called Errogie which is supposed to be the geographical centre of the Highlands. Boleskine was then the nearest consecrated ground to Errogie and it's thought his soul, or part of it, ended here."

Dent also experienced the "most terrifying night of my life" at Boleskine. He awoke one night to hear what sounded like a wild animal snorting and banging outside his bedroom door. It went on for some time and it was not until morning that Dent dared open the door, and there was nothing there. Dent added "whatever was there was pure evil." Another friend who stayed at Boleskine awoke one night and claimed that she had been attacked by "some kind of devil". Other occurrences, such as chairs switching places, doors slamming open and closed for no reason and carpets and rugs rolling up inexplicably, failed to deter Dent from staying. Dent met his wife at Boleskine and raised his family there.

Although Jimmy Page never spent a great length of time there, he did everything he could to return the house to how it would have looked during Crowley's ownership. For example, he commissioned an artist, Charles Pace, to paint some Crowley-esque murals on the walls. These were based on the murals in Crowley's Abbey of Thelema in Sicily discovered by Kenneth Anger in 1955.

=== MacGillivray family (1992–2002) ===
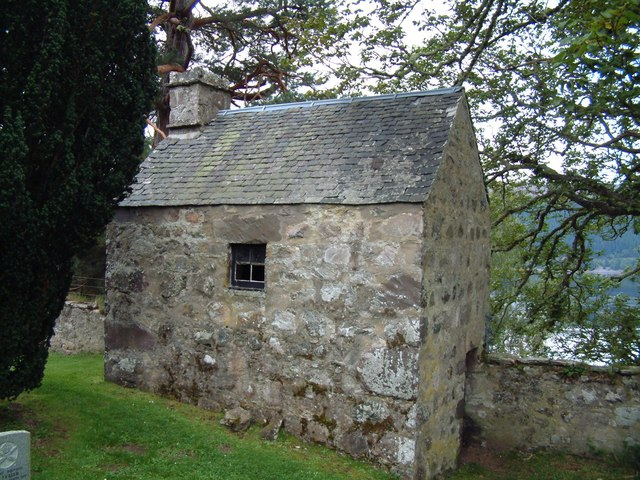
Boleskine Mortuary House in the graveyard in 2002

The house was put on the market for £250,000 in 1991. It was purchased by Ronald and Annette MacGillivray in 1992. According to Mrs MacGillivray, when they bought the house it was in a very bad state. The MacGillivrays "spent a lot of money stripping it back to the bare walls and re-roofing it. It had four bedrooms, four bathrooms, a huge drawing room, dining room, library and various smaller rooms". The house was then converted into a hotel.

Ronald MacGillivray died in 2002. He was said to hate any reference to the house's dark past when it was home to Crowley.

When asked whether she had experienced any mysterious occurrences at Boleskine House, his wife states that she experienced "absolutely none. I am a non-believer and didn't listen to all that rubbish. We had a great time there."

=== Private ownership (2002–2015) ===
Following Ronald MacGillivray's death, Boleskine House was put up for sale again. The new Dutch owners converted the house back into a private residence and used it as a holiday home.

In 2009, a 1.9-acre (7,700 m^{2}) plot on the former estate was put on the market for £176,000 with plans to build a three-bedroom log house. The sale also included 140 feet (43 m) of foreshore on Loch Ness.

=== Conflagration (2015) ===
At approximately 1:40 pm on 23 December 2015, a motorist on the A82 road reported flames and smoke coming from Boleskine House. When fire crews attended, it is estimated up to 60 percent of the building had already been incinerated, with flames rising up to 20 feet (6 m) high. The firefighters concentrated on the west wing of the house, as the rest of the building had been severely damaged.

The owner's business partner and daughter had gone shopping and returned to find the house ablaze. The fire was thought to have started in the kitchen, but nobody was believed to be in the house at the time of the fire and there were no casualties.

=== 2015–present ===
The interior of the house was almost totally destroyed by the fires. Part of the roof and the outer walls survived, but the former owner, Mrs. MacGillivray, had said that since the extent of the damage was so bad it was "unlikely it will ever be rebuilt unless there is someone out there with an interest in the occult wanting to spend a lot of money." The ruins and 22 acres (8.9 ha) of land were put on the market for £500,000 in April 2019. They were purchased by the Boleskine House Foundation SCIO with the aim of restoring the house and gardens to their original form and then opening the estate to the public.

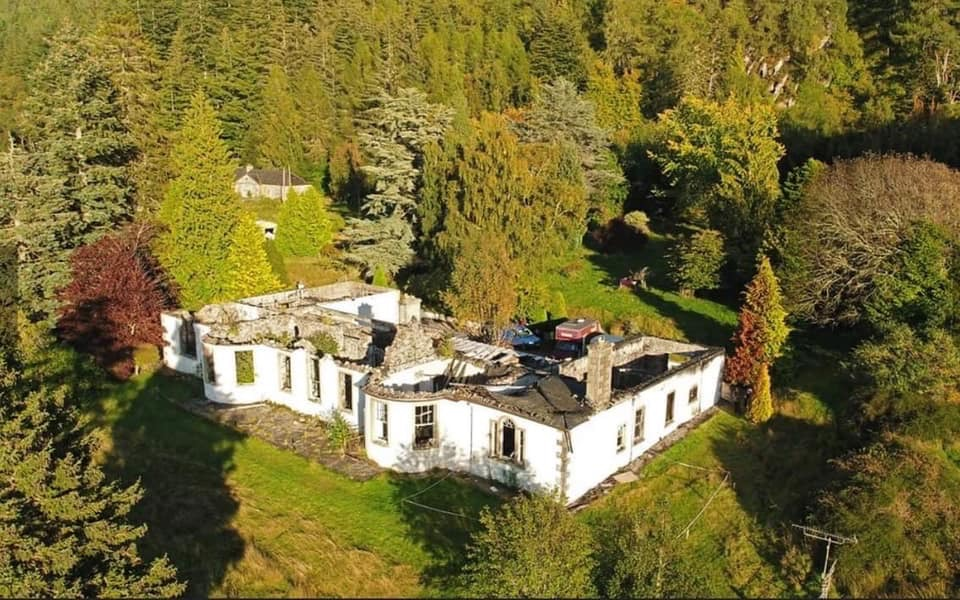
Boleskine House in October 2019, with its roof destroyed

A further fire broke out on 31 July 2019 in two buildings on the estate at the same time in a suspected arson. The police appealed to the public for any information on those involved. The fire destroyed the remainder of what was left inside Boleskine House, and in December 2019, work was done to clear the fire-damaged material and prepare the building for a new roof.

Starting from 2020, members of the public could visit Boleskine House through pre-arranged visits between renovation works.

In 2023, the Boleskine House Foundation announced plans to open the house to the public permanently in 2025. Throughout the restoration work traditional building techniques and materials were used in order to preserve its historic integrity. The final cost of the restoration was expected to be between £1.2 million and £1.5 million.

Even before restoration work had been fully completed, in 2024 Boleskine House earned Tripadvisor's Travelers' Choice Award for two consecutive years. In September 2024 the Boleskine house closed for the last phase of restoration, which was completed in April 2026. This phase mainly focused on redesigning the interior, to re-imagine the Jacobean, Georgian and Victorian periods with a traditional drawing room, dining room and library. In charge of the design was the foundation's in-house volunteer design team and Inverness-based conservation accredited LDN architects. Local firm Simpson Builders were responsible for overseeing the project. The project was supported by an award of £250,000 from the National Lottery Heritage Fund.

Boleskine House is a Category B listed building, as are the adjacent stables and gate lodge.

== In popular culture ==
Boleskine House is described and recognisable in W. Somerset Maugham's 1908 book The Magician, where it is called "Skene". Crowley considered Maugham's book to be plagiarism and wrote an article under the name of Oliver Haddo (the name of a character taken from Maugham's book) for Vanity Fair as a reply.

Jimmy Page's fantasy sequence in the 1976 Led Zeppelin concert film The Song Remains the Same was shot on the Boleskine House property.

In Neil Spring's 2019 novel The Burning House, the house plays a major role.
