= Loch Dochfour =

Lake in Scotland

- Location within Scotland
- Location: Scottish Highlands
- Coordinates: 57°25′00″N 4°19′30″W
- Type: freshwater loch
- Primary inflows: Loch Ness
- Primary outflows: River Ness/Caledonian Canal
- Surface elevation: 15.8 m (52 ft)
- Settlements: Lochend; Dochgarroch.

Loch Dochfour is a freshwater loch in the Scottish Highlands southwest of Inverness, part of the Great Glen. The southern end flows in through the Bona narrows from Loch Ness. The northern end flows out through the River Ness and the Caledonian Canal towards the Beauly and Moray Firths to the North Sea.

As part of the construction of the Caledonian Canal supervised by Thomas Telford, the Ness Weir was constructed across the natural outflow just south of Dochgarroch. This raised the level of Loch Dochfour by almost two metres (6 ft 7 in), and the level of Loch Ness by 1.2 m (3 ft 11 in), making them equal in level. Before construction of the Caledonian Canal, Loch Ness ended at Lochend, flowing into the River Ness. This means that Loch Dochfour can be seen as that part of the River Ness upstream from the weir, or as an extension of Loch Ness northwards to the weir, or as part of the Caledonian Canal, or as a loch in itself. The Bathymetrical survey of the Scottish fresh-water lochs considered Loch Dochfour to be distinct from Loch Ness proper, but capable of being regarded as forming part of Loch Ness.

The A82 road runs adjacent to and in part on an embankment over Loch Dochfour.

== Ness Weir ==
Also known locally as Dochfour Weir, the Ness Weir was designed by Thomas Telford and constructed between 1825 and 1830. Originally 90 m (300 ft) long, by 1828 it was extended a further 430 m (1,410 ft) with panels of pitching between timber board on the regraded ground.

As part of the development of the Foyers pumped-storage hydropower scheme, the weir was modified in 1972–1973 with a set of sluices at the southern end. Construction was by Sir Alexander Gibb & Partners for the North of Scotland Hydro-Electric Board.

In March 2018, a project to reinforce the weir was completed, extending the lifespan by another century. Almost 500 m of the weir was reinforced with steel piling, with over 10,000 m in total length used in the construction. The £2m project was funded by the Scottish Government, and the works carried out by Mackenzie Construction.

Statera Energy are developing plans to modify the Ness Weir alongside their proposed Loch Kemp pumped storage hydroelectricity project. They propose to raise the existing weir height, and install a new titling weir and fish pass are proposed. Statera Energy say this will allow the water level in Loch Ness to be better controlled, and will provide resilience against future climate change. It would allow the proposed pumped storage schemes to operate more efficiently, while proving stable water levels for canal navigation. The first round of public consultation was held in November 2024.

Loch Dochfour (and Loch Ness) is considered a reservoir under the Reservoirs Act 1975, as the Ness Weir impounds some 100,000,000 m^{3} (3.5×10^{9} cu ft) of water. The dam is 8 m (26 ft) high and 1,150 m (3,770 ft) long and rated as category B. The catchment is 1,810 km^{2} (700 sq mi) with an average annual rainfall of 1,851 mm (72.9 in).
