= Stratherrick =

Valley in Highland, Scotland

Coordinates: 57.25°N 4.42°W

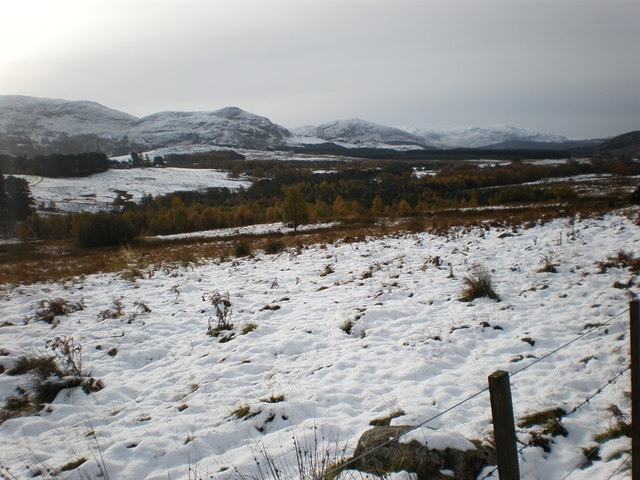
Winter in Stratherrick

Stratherrick (Scottish Gaelic: Srath Fhairgeag / Srath Fharragaig) is a strath situated above the south-eastern shore of Loch Ness, in the Scottish Highlands, Scotland. Much of the strath is covered by Loch Mhòr. This is a generally shallow loch, which acts as a reservoir for the Foyers hydro electricity schemes.

The area has a number of small settlements, these include Whitebridge, Gorthleck, Aberchalder and Errogie. Stratherrick Primary School is in Gorthleck. There is a Catholic church, Immaculate Conception Parish Church, Stratherrick near Whitebridge.
