= Georgina Fraser Newhall =

Canadian writer, stenographer, teacher

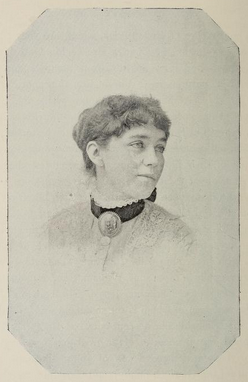
- Newhall's photo in The Clan Fraser in Canada, 1894
- Born: Georgina Alexandrina Fraser; 2 September 1860; Galt, Canada West
- Died: 11 November 1932 (aged 72); Calgary, Alberta, Canada
- Education: Dr. Tassie's School
- Occupations: author, stenographer, teacher
- Spouse: Eugene Pier Newhall (m. 1884)
- Writing career
- Genres: journalism, poetry, short stories, essays
- Notable work: "Fraser's Drinking Song"

Georgina Fraser Newhall (née, Fraser; 2 September 1860 – 11 November 1932) was a Canadian writer of poetry and short stories, and a teacher. She was the country's first female stenographer. She distinguished herself through her poetic and prose writings. She served as the bardess of the Clan Fraser Society of Canada, and her "Fraser's Drinking Song", set to a stirring martial tune, was adopted as the society's "Faille" (welcome). Newhall wrote numerous articles for leading literary periodicals. She frequently produced short stories, a line of writing in which she has had probably more success, and was more prolific than most Canadian writers of the time. Because of her versatility, she championed causes, formulated social ideas, and contributed essays to the press on the social status of women and her place in the economy of the future.

== Early life and education ==
Georgina Fraser was born in Galt, Canada West, 2 September 1860. Her ancestry included Mackenzie, MacLeod, Munro, and Fraser clans. Her father, James George Fraser, was a highly esteemed citizen of Galt. He was a scion of the Frasers of Stratherrick house. Like his brother Capt. Charles Fraser, who resided in Glasgow, Scotland, James was attached to a Highland regiment in his younger days, but withdrawing from the service, he came to Canada with his young wife, Christina MacLeod. Their children -three sons, William, Charles and Andrew, and four daughters, Christina, Jessie, Elizabeth and Georgina (the youngest)- were all born in Galt. On the maternal side, Newhall's descent was traced from the families of Lochend and Braemore. Her great-grandparents were George Mackenzie, second son of John Mackenzie I. of Lochend (of the Gairloch family), and Christina, daughter of Captain Hector Munro of Braemore. George Mackenzie was a distinguished officer, and attained to the rank of Lieut.Colonel of the Ross-shire Buffs, the 78th Highlanders. His daughter, Christina, married Angus MacLeod of Banff with issue, two sons, Donald and George, and several daughters, of whom Christina, as already stated, married James George Fraser of Gait.

Newhall was precocious as a child. She received her education at the public and high schools in Gait, and was a pupil of Dr. Tassie's School. After the death of her parents, she removed to Toronto, and took up the study of shorthand.

== Career ==
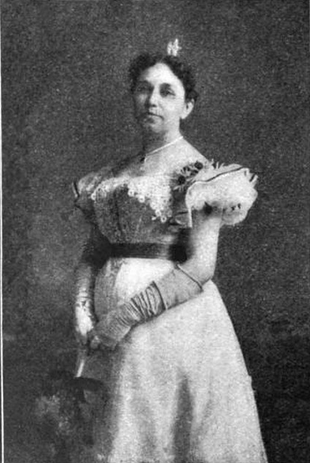
Georgina Fraser Newhall

After completing her education, she resided for a few years in the province of Quebec, and afterwards in Toronto, working as an amanuensis. After studying the problems affecting working girls, she conceived the idea of helping them by imparting a knowledge of stenography, which she was thoroughly competent to do. This led her to the formation of classes, which she taught. These were large classes in the towns surrounding Toronto, and in Victoria College (now Victoria University, Toronto), when that institution was located at Cobourg. In addition to these duties, she undertook journalistic work, and was the first woman writer in Toronto to conduct the department devoted to woman's interests. Occupying a position on the daily press, she developed her talents as a descriptive writer, in addition to the regular work of her stenographer's position.

In 1884, while occupying the position of Assistant Secretary to General Manager Thomas Fletcher Oakes of the Northern Pacific Railway at Saint Paul, Minnesota, she married Eugene Pier Newhall, of the Pacific Express Co. in Omaha, Nebraska. She divided her time between a home at Canton, Ohio, and a fruit farm she owned in Scarborough Township, Ontario.

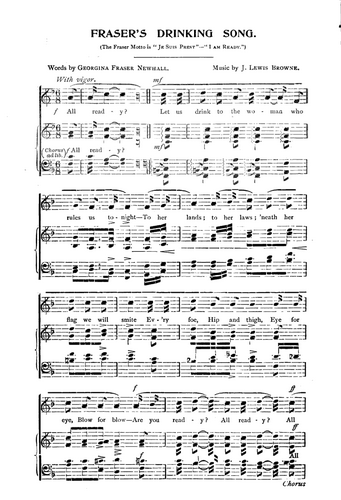
"Fraser's Drinking Song"

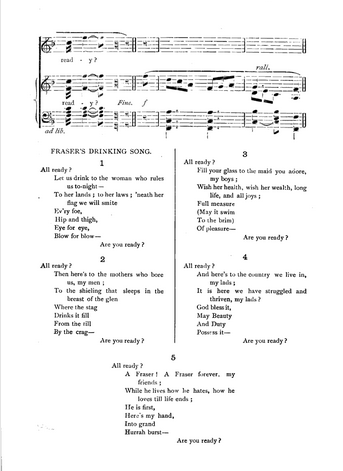
(continued)

Newhall was successful as a writer of short stories, of magazine articles and of verse, which made her name widely-known. She was bardess to the Clan Fraser Society of Canada. Her themes were general in character, although Scottish subjects predominated. Her "Fraser’s Drinking Song" from was adopted as the "Failte" of the Clan Fraser Society of Canada, and was sung to a stirring martial tune at the annual gatherings, with music composed by John Lewis Browne.

== Personal life ==
As a clanswoman, Newhall was fond of claiming the right to call herself a "black" Fraser, nature having endowed her with dark hair and eyebrows which was supposed to be proof of "true Frasers".
