= Falls of Foyers =

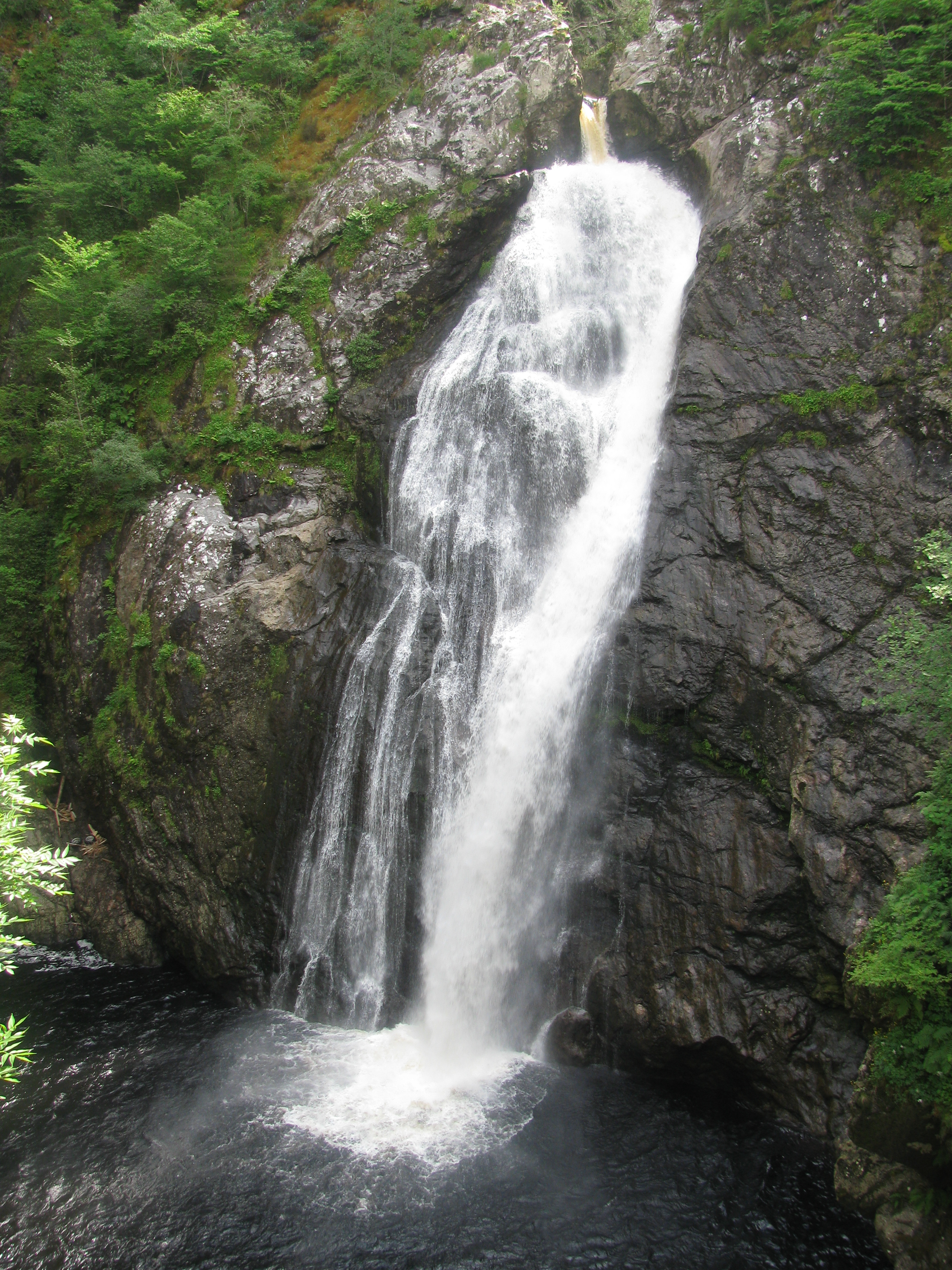
- Falls of Foyers

- Location within Scotland
- Location: Loch Ness, Highland, Scotland
- Coordinates: 57.24862°N 4.49269°W
- Total height: 144 feet (44 m)
- Number of drops: 2
- Longest drop: 98 feet (30 m)

The Falls of Foyers (Scottish Gaelic: Eas na Smùide, meaning the smoking falls) are two waterfalls on the River Foyers, which feeds Loch Ness, in Highland, Scotland. They are located on the lower portion of the River Foyers, and consist of the upper falls, with a drop of 46 feet (14 m) and the lower falls, which drop 98 feet (30 m). The River Foyers flows into Loch Ness on the south-eastern shore about half-way along its length, where the village of Foyers is sited.

The falls are known for their grandeur, despite not being the highest in Scotland. In 2018, The Scotsman included the Falls of Foyers as one of the "Eleven most stunning waterfalls in Scotland". They had impressed visitors to the Highlands since the eighteenth century, including Robert Burns, the Wordsworths and Southey. Burns wrote a poem in 1787 about the falls, "Lines on the Fall of Fyers, near Loch Ness".

The Falls of Foyers influenced Robert Addams, a travelling lecturer in natural philosophy, to write a paper in 1834 about the motion aftereffect. He observed that after watching the waterfall for a while, nearby rocks appeared to move upwards.Nikolova, Niia; Wade, Nick (9 June 2019). "Waterfall illusion: Still objects seem to move". EarthSky. Archived from the original on 8 September 2022.

The falls were a popular destination for tourists using the MacBrayne pleasure steamers operating on Loch Ness, running along the Caledonian Canal from Fort William to Inverness. In 1895, the British Aluminium Company (BAC) began building an aluminium smelting plant, which required large amounts of electricity. The hydro-electric station at the plant took large volumes of water from the River Foyers from an intake just above the falls, significantly reducing their flow. The plant was built without the need for Parliamentary approval, because the company bought the Lower Foyers estate, through which the river ran, and they were thus able to ignore the public outcry at the spoiling of an amenity. The BAC argued that the benefits of the scheme to Foyers and the Highlands would be greater than the damage caused. Artist Mary Rose Hill Burton, who was active in the unsuccessful resistance against the smelting plant, made many drawings and paintings of the falls before the plant was built, to capture the landscape in nature before it was lost. The Aluminium smelter closed in 1967.

The 1895 hydropower scheme had dammed Loch Garth and raised its level by 20 feet (6.1 m). Because it then joined Loch Farraline, the reservoir was renamed Loch Mhòr. This later became the upper reservoir for a pumped-storage hydro-electric scheme when the newly closed works was taken over by the North of Scotland Hydro Electric Board (now SSE). They installed a 5 MW turbine at the aluminium works, and constructed a tunnel from Loch Mhòr to feed a new power station located further to the north on the shore of Loch Ness. This has a capacity of 300 MW, and to preserve the amenity of the area, underground cables carry the power to a switching station some 3,000 feet (910 m) from the power station site. Further reductions to the flow over the falls have occurred as part of the pump-storage scheme construction, as a result of diverting the River E into Loch Mhòr, and channelling most of the flow of the River Fechlin to it as well. Both formerly fed into the River Foyers, and hence the falls.

== See also ==
- List of waterfalls
- List of waterfalls in the United Kingdom

== Notes ==
1. This article incorporates text from a publication now in the public domain: Wood, James, ed. (1907). "Foyers, Fall of". The Nuttall Encyclopædia. London and New York: Frederick Warne.
2. MAE Waterfalls

== Bibliography ==
- Payne, Peter L (1988). The Hydro. Aberdeen University Press. ISBN 978-0-08-036584-8.
