= Inverfarigaig =

Coordinates: 57.28034°N 4.45399°W

Inverfarigaig: Scottish Gaelic: Inbhir Farragaig
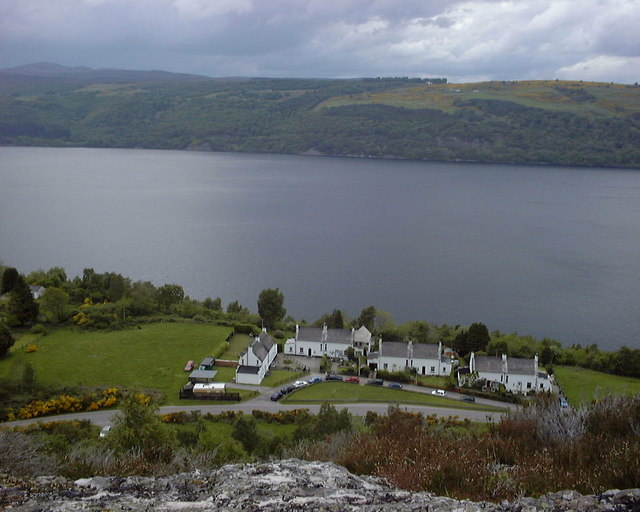
- Foresters' houses at Inverfarigaig with Loch Ness beyond.

- Location within the Inverness area
- OS grid reference: NH521237
- Council area: Highland
- Country: Scotland
- Sovereign state: United Kingdom
- Post town: Inverness
- Postcode district: IV2 6
- Police: Scotland
- Fire: Scottish
- Ambulance: Scottish

Inverfarigaig (Scottish Gaelic: Inbhir Farragaig) is a hamlet at the mouth of the River Farigaig, on the south-east shore of Loch Ness in Inverness-shire, Scottish Highlands and is in the Scottish council area of Highland.

== Geography ==
The hamlet is situated on the B852, part of the Military Road built by General George Wade, 12 miles (19 kilometres) northeast of Fort Augustus. The village of Foyers is located two miles (three kilometres) to the southwest and the village of Dores 8 miles (13 km) to the northeast. The villages of Bunloit and Balbeg are directly across Loch Ness, and the village of Drumnadrochit is close to them. The prominent peak of Meall Fuar-mhonaidh is also visible across the loch.

== Iron Age Fort ==
Above Inverfarigaig is the Iron Age fort of Dun Deardail (Scottish Gaelic: Dùn Deardail, meaning "Deirdre's Fort"), at an elevation of 925 ft (282 m) above sea level; it is associated with the legend of Deirdre of the Sorrows. Deirdre and the three sons of Usnach were meant to have lived near the fort for some of the time they stayed in Scotland. The fort was built by the Celts some time around 700 BCE and has been found to be partly vitrified.

== Royal Navy air crash ==
On 29 May 1944, a Fleet Air Arm Stinson Reliant, serial FK943, flying out of RAF Skeabrae in Orkney, returning to base at HMS Monck at Port Glasgow, crashed one mile (1.5 kilometres) east of Inverfarigaig after clipping a tree whilst trying to remain under a low cloudbase, killing all three officers on board. Lieutenant Commanders Oliver Cairns and Norman O'Neil MC, and Commander Robert Ellis were all subsequently buried at the Tomnahurich Cemetery in Inverness.

== Conservation ==
Broadleaf woodland to the immediate east of Inverfarigaig has been designated a Site of Special Scientific Interest by NatureScot due to the tree species present and the associated ground biota.
