= Boleskine House Foundation =

Scottish charity

- The Boleskine House Foundation SCIO
- Legal status: Not-for-profit Scottish Charitable Incorporated Organisation, registered with the OSCR
- Purpose: Conservation and restoration of cultural heritage of the Boleskine House estate
- Location: South-east side of Loch Ness, Foyers, Inverness, Scotland
- Services: Once restored, the estate will be opened to the public for the purposes of heritage, education, health and wellness
- Website: www.boleskinehouse.org

The Boleskine House Foundation is a not-for-profit Scottish charitable incorporated organisation established 26 August 2019 to restore and maintain the Boleskine House estate, a category B listed building, with the goal of historic conservation, preserving Scottish heritage and the improvement of the local economy.

== Background ==
Boleskine House, notable for its association with Aleister Crowley and Jimmy Page, and situated on the banks of Loch Ness, Scotland, suffered extensive fire damage in December 2015, and was placed on the Buildings at Risk Register for Scotland in 2018. In April 2019, the estate was divided into four lots and put up for sale. Kyra and Keith Readdy purchased lots one and three. Most of Lot one was then given to the charity in late 2019. On 7 May 2020 the charity then purchased the “lot 2” lands which comprise the former coach house, piggery and grazing land.

Having purchased the site, the Readdys set up the foundation in August 2019, with the aim of preserving the building and estate. Keith Readdy is a researcher in comparative religion and modern and contemporary Western esotericism. Keith Readdy is now chairman of the charity and runs it alongside an independent board of trustees. Kyra Readdy has stepped back from active involvement with the charity to focus on family life.

One week after the purchase, a second fire broke out at the house, in an event which was reported at the time as a suspected arson. In a bid to raise funds to restore the property, the foundation sold bags of fire-damaged rubble from the house on eBay.

== Aims ==
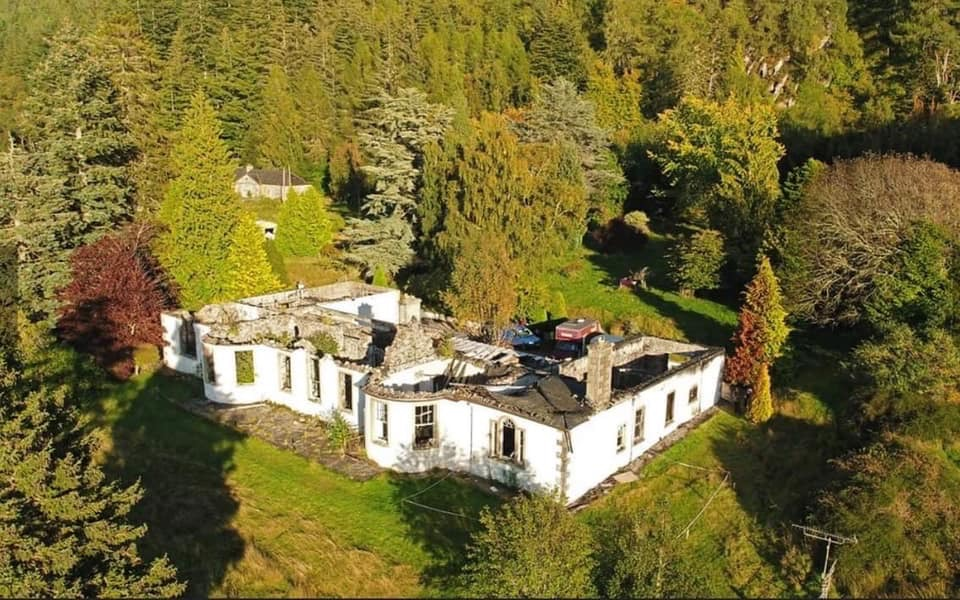
Boleskine House

The Foundation's stated aims are to restore Boleskine House and its gardens, reflecting its history as a Jacobean and Georgian hunting lodge. In 2019 and 2020, the Foundation stated its wish to open the house to the public once the restoration reaches completion, including guided tours of the principal rooms of the house and the surrounding gardens, and an on-site library focused on local Scottish history and Western esotericism.

Despite the site's spiritual and religious associations, the Foundation is a secular organisation. However, the Foundation has stated that it wishes to engage with the spiritual importance of the property, from its early Christian history as a parish church, to its significance to Thelema.

== Funding and restoration ==
The Foundation is dependent upon donations, fundraising and volunteers. In January 2020 the Foundation reported that they were 25% toward their crowdfunding target and intended to put in a planning application the same year, with the aim of opening the main rooms of the house to the public in 2022. The total cost of rebuilding the house was reported to be around £700,000. Planning permission and listed building consent to rebuild was obtained in December 2020 and work has now begun on site to rebuild.

As of April 2026, Boleskine House has been fully restored and is now available for members of the public to visit.
