= Glendoe Hydro Scheme =

Hydro-electric power scheme in Scotland

Glendoe Reservoir
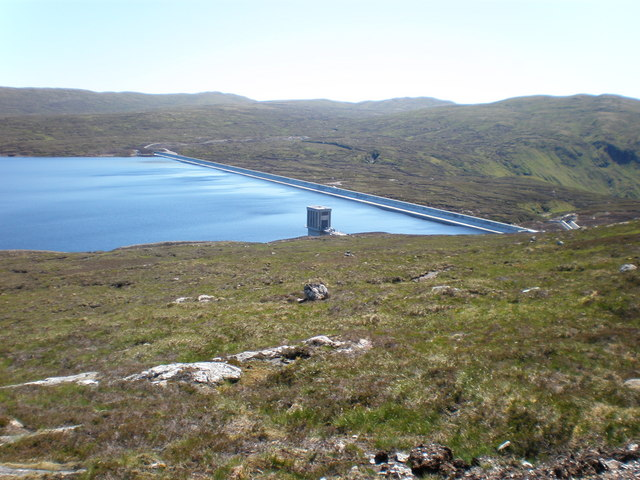

- Location within Highland
- Official name: Glendoe Hydro Scheme
- Country: United Kingdom
- Location: Scottish Highlands
- Coordinates: 57.093°N 4.556°W
- Opening date: 29 June 2009
- Owner: Scottish and Southern Energy

Dam and spillways
- Height: 35 m (115 ft)
- Length: 905 m (2,969 ft)

Reservoir
- Catchment area: Immediate: 15 km^{2} (5.8 sq mi); Attached: 60 km^{2} (23 sq mi)
- Maximum length: 2 km (1.2 mi)
- Normal elevation: 630 m (2,070 ft)

Power Station
- Installed capacity: 100 MW (max. planned)

The Glendoe Hydro Scheme for the generation of hydro-electric power is located in the Monadhliath Mountains near Fort Augustus, above Loch Ness in the Highlands of Scotland. The change in financial incentives following the publication of the Renewables Obligation in 2001 caused Scottish and Southern Energy (SSE) to reconsider a number of schemes that had been mothballed in the 1960s by the North of Scotland Hydro-Electric Board, and plans for the Glendoe scheme were resurrected.

Construction started in 2006, and Hochtief completed the scheme in 2009. It is operated by SSE and was opened on 29 June 2009 by Queen Elizabeth, accompanied by the Duke of Edinburgh. Part of the main headrace tunnel collapsed in August 2009, and remedial work was not completed until 2012, with generation restarting in April. SSE and Hochtief failed to agree on who was responsible for the cost of the failure, but SSE were awarded damages in 2018 in the court of appeal, despite an adjudication and the first court case finding that the cost was an operational risk to be borne by SSE.

== History ==
The completion of several schemes by the North of Scotland Hydro-Electric Board in the early 1960s brought to an end over two decades of expansion of conventional hydro-electricity in the Highlands of Scotland. Subsequently, Cruachan was commissioned in 1968, and Foyers in 1974, but both of these were pumped storage schemes.

In 2001, the Scottish Parliament set an objective of increasing the proportion of electricity generated from renewable sources to 18 per cent by 2010, as part of their Scottish Climate Change Programme. The publication of the Renewables Obligation in 2001 made any new hydro-electric scheme eligible under the incentive, whereas previously only those under 10 Megawatts (MW) had qualified. This changed the financial incentives for building new hydro-electric plants, and SSE plc, who inherited most of the Hydro-Electric Board's assets when the electricity industry was privatised, reviewed all of the large schemes that the Board had considered, but which had not been built. Nearly all had been abandoned because of their environmental impact in areas which had a high amenity value, but the exception was Glendoe.

Various configurations were then considered, from a small run-of-the-river scheme generating under 10 MW, to a huge pumped storage scheme. The smaller schemes were discarded because of the cost of transferring the water from the Glendoe plateau down to Loch Ness, while the pumped storage option was discarded because it would not qualify under the Renewable Obligation scheme, and because the difference in levels between the top reservoir and Loch Ness was sufficient that it would be extremely costly to overcome the issues this would introduce. Once the choice of Glendoe was made in October 2001, an environmental statement was produced and the design was refined by May 2003. SSE then applied for planning consent under section 36 of the Electricity Act 1989, and this was eventually granted in June 2005.

Although there were few objections to the scheme, and the local community was supportive, SSE did not know how long the planning consent process would take, and so began a design and build tendering process which ran concurrently. Because they could not undertake investigative work until deals with the landowners had been agreed, the design was kept flexible throughout the process. The turbine house might be above or below ground, the output of the scheme could be between 50 MW and 100 MW, while the dam could be constructed of rockfill or roller compacted concrete. A contract for the scheme was awarded to Hochtief in December 2005, and they began producing the detailed designs and starting construction from January 2006.

Before work could start on the main scheme, various enabling works had to be done. The bridge that carries the B862 road over the River Tarff near Fort Augustus had to be strengthened to cope with the weight of construction vehicles, and this work was done in five weeks starting on 21 November 2005. A refurbished tunnel boring machine was ordered from Herrenknecht, a start was made on the 28 miles (45 km) of roads needed to access the various sites where work was to be carried out, and a planning application was made to allow work camps to be constructed. These were built high up on the Glendoe plateau, and accommodated most of the 750 workers who were employed on the project.

=== Construction ===
A ceremony attended by Tony Blair, the British prime minister, and Jack McConnell, the First Minister of Scotland, marked the formal start of construction. They detonated an explosive charge, to begin the reshaping of the valley. A reservoir for the scheme was created by building a dam across the River Tarff. The dam is 3,150 feet (960 m) long, and some 115 feet (35 m) high where it crosses the original course of the river, but much lower at the sides. It is a rock fill dam, with most of the rock coming from a quarry which was flooded as the reservoir filled with water. The upstream side is faced with concrete, while the downstream side is exposed rock. The dam cannot be seen from any of the houses and public roads in the area.

The catchment for the reservoir is around 5.8 square miles (15 km^{2}) as it is fed by the upper reaches of the River Tarff, the Caochan Uilleim, and runoff from the A' Chraidhleag bog. Water is collected from another 23 square miles (60 km^{2}) by intakes constructed on numerous streams, and transporting the water to the reservoir by a network of underground pipes and tunnels. The main tunnel is 5.3 miles (8.5 km) long, of which 4.3 miles (7 km) were constructed by the drill-and-blast method and lined with shotcrete. The rest was built using the cut-and-cover technique. There are a further 2.5 miles (4 km) of 6.6-foot (2 m) diameter pipe to complete the network. Water is collected from at least 14 intakes which feed into the network. When full, the reservoir covers around 0.58 square miles (1.5 km^{2}) and its surface is at 2,070 feet (630 m) above Ordnance datum. (AOD). Water is drawn down to a maximum of 20 feet (6 m) below this level when the power station is operating, on environmental grounds.

The power station was constructed underground, in a cavern 125 by 59 feet (38 by 18 m) and 105 feet (32 m) high, excaved from solid rock by drill-and-blast. The cavern is 820 feet (250 m) below the surface, at a level where the tailrace to Loch Ness is almost horizontal. A 5.3-mile (8.5 km) tunnel connects the reservoir to Loch Ness, with the turbines about 1.2 miles (2 km) from the loch. Some of it was cut by drill-and-blast, but the majority was created by a 16-foot (5 m) diameter tunnel boring machine, 720 feet (220 m) long and named "Eliza Jane" after a competition by local schoolchildren. There is a drop of 1,970 feet (600 m) from the reservoir to the turbine house, and most of the headrace tunnel slopes uphill at a gradient of 12 per cent. The hard rock tunnel boring machine started at the bottom end in September 2006 and worked continuously for 16 months to reach the top on 7 January 2008, having cut through 4.675 miles (7.524 km) of rock. There is a second smaller cavern which houses the transformers next to the turbine house cavern, and the complex is accessed by a tunnel 0.8 miles (1.3 km) long, running from near the B862 road from Fort Augustus.

For schemes between 50 MW and 100 MW, the tunnels would need to be a similar size, as making them smaller also makes building them more difficult. The cost of building either scheme is therefore similar, and SSE took the decision to go with the larger size, as it also has significant operational benefits. Consideration was given to using a fully-pressurised Francis turbine or a multi-jet Pelton turbine. While a Francis turbine can be brought online and offline more quickly, the slope of the ground between the reservoir and the turbine house meant that there were no suitable sites to build a surge shaft, and so the engineering needed to cope with pressure changes would have been complex. A Pelton turbine takes longer to bring online or offline, but deflectors can be used so that the turbine stops before the water flow does, which significantly reduces pressure surges. SSE decided that they could cope with the slower response time, as the benefits of the Pelton system's simplicity outweighed the complexity of the Francis system. They therefore chose to install an Andritz six-jet vertical-axis Pelton turbine which can generate up to 100 MW, from a peak flow of 660 cubic feet per second (18.6 m^{3}/s).

Alex Salmond in his role as First Minister of Scotland initiated the filling of the reservoir on 1 September 2008. Hochtief completed the contract two months early, and the station had been generating power since January 2009 when a formal opening of the scheme took place on 29 June 2009, at which Queen Elizabeth accompanied by Prince Philip, Duke of Edinburgh officiated. The power station is operated remotely from SSE's control centre in Perth.

=== Station shutdown ===
In August 2009 the station was shut down and the headrace tunnel drained because of internal rock falls near the upper end of it. Although the equipment in the power station was not affected, Glendoe was unable to generate power until repairs were made. SSE reported that electricity generation was unlikely to proceed until at least April 2011.

SSE employed Jacobs Gibb and Jacobs UK as their engineers, and the original designs were for a fully-lined tunnel constructed by drill-and-blast. However, during the tendering process, Pöyry Energy JV who were the design engineers for Hochtief recommended that a tunnel boring machine should be used to excavate the tunnel. This would give a much smoother finish to the walls of the tunnel, and only around 40 per cent would need to be lined. Decisions as to how much lining to apply were taken once the rock could be seen, and less than one percent was actually lined. The completed tunnel was carefully inspected by Hochtief, Pöyry, Jacobs and SSE before being signed off. After about 8 months of use, some 233 feet (71 m) of the tunnel collapsed and was blocked by the rock fall. Robert Galbraith QC was appointed by Hochtief and SSE to adjudicate in 2011, and decided that Hochtief were not to blame for the collapse. Rather than take the dispute to arbitration, where the issues would be judged by technically qualified, professional engineers, SSE chose to pursue the matter in court, where it would be decided on legal issues by judges who were not technically qualified.

The collapse occurred in the Conagleann Fault Zone, around 1.2 miles (2 km) from the top end of the tunnel. The fault was known from its appearance at surface level, but during tunnelling, the tunnel boring machine had passed through it, and SSE recorded that its existence was imperceptible. A contract for repair work was awarded to BAM Nuttall, who built a diversion tunnel around the rockfall by drill-and-blast. This was full-lined with 20 inches (500 mm) of waterproof concrete, and they also applied a 4-inch (100 mm) concrete lining to almost half of the rest of the tunnel. A downstream access tunnel was also built as part of the repair contract. Energy generation at the scheme restarted in August 2012.

SSE issued proceedings seeking to recover £130 million in repair and reinstatement costs and £65 million in alleged loss of profit from Hochtief, but in December 2016 Hochtief was held by the Scottish Court of Session not to have been liable for the collapse, and that it was an operational risk to be borne by SSE. In an appeal decided in 2018, SSE were awarded more than £107 million in compensation. The judges hearing the appeal split 2-to-1 in SSE's favour. Hochtief subsequently appealed, and the case will be heard by the Supreme Court.

== Scheme details ==
Glendoe has a hydraulic head of 600 m (2,000 ft), the highest of any hydro-electric scheme in the United Kingdom, and is thus ideally suited to generating large amounts of energy from the stored water in the reservoir, especially when combined with the relatively high annual rainfall in the area of around 2,000 mm (79 in).

At the time of its construction, it was the largest of Scotland's recent civil engineering projects, with Hochtief as the design and build contractor. The scheme is predicted to produce about 180 GWh of electricity per year, and to operate at a load factor of approximately 20 percent. This is based on the amount of water falling on the catchment in an average year, and is enough to provide approximately 5% of the electricity consumption of the city of Glasgow.

== Bibliography ==
- Barrass, Rebecca (6 June 2018). "Glendoe Tunnel – the collapse of reasonable skill and care?". Scottish Construction Now. Archived from the original on 4 October 2023.
- Ellery, Simon (1 December 2008). "Glendoe hydro scheme, the real monster of Loch Ness". Construction News. Archived from the original on 5 January 2024.
- Hencher, S R (17 April 2019). "The Glendoe Tunnel Collapse in Scotland" (PDF). Rock Mechanics and Rock Engineering. 52. doi:10.1007/s00603-019-01812-w. Archived (PDF) from the original on 29 April 2019.
- Horgan, Rob (6 June 2018). "Supreme Court to rule on collapsed Glendoe hydro tunnel". New Civil Engineer. Archived from the original on 5 January 2024.
- Lord Woolman (21 December 2016). "SSE Generation Ltd against Hochtief Solutions AG and Another". Scottish Courts and Tribunals. Archived from the original on 31 January 2023.
- MacKay, David (7 January 2008). "How much hydro to power Glasgow". Archived from the original on 21 November 2023.
- Reeves, Julian, ed. (2018). Power from the Glens - 75th Anniversary edition. SSE. ISBN 978-1-5272-2500-8.
- Reynolds, Patrick (22 June 2012). "Glendoe returns". Water Power Magazine. Archived from the original on 20 August 2022.
- Seaton, Mike; Sawyer, John (2006). "Glendoe Hydroelectric Scheme, Optimisation and Dam Selection" (PDF). Improvements in reservoir construction, operation and maintenance. London: Thomas Telford. ISBN 978-0-7277-3470-9. Archived (PDF) from the original on 3 January 2024.
- Wynne, Alexandra (21 January 2010). "Tunnel repairs to begin on disaster-struck hydro scheme". New Civil Engineer. London: EMAP International. Archived from the original on 3 January 2024.
