= River Tarff, Fort Augustus =

River in Highland, Scotland

Coordinates: 57°08′N 4°40′W

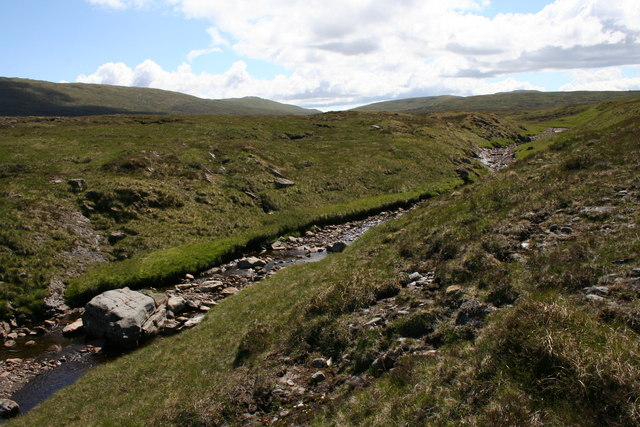
River Tarff above Glendoe Reservoir

The River Tarff is a river in Inverness-shire in the Scottish Highlands. It rises between the hills of Gairbeinn and Geal Charn and flows northwards then southwestwards and finally north-northwestwards into the Great Glen where it enters Loch Ness at Fort Augustus. The middle and lower reaches of the river are confined within the gorge of Glen Tarff. Its headwaters have been dammed to form the Glendoe Reservoir which forms the upper water storage basin for the Glendoe Hydro Scheme which began operation in 2009.
