= River E =

River in Highland, Scotland

Coordinates: 57.21891°N 4.46082°W

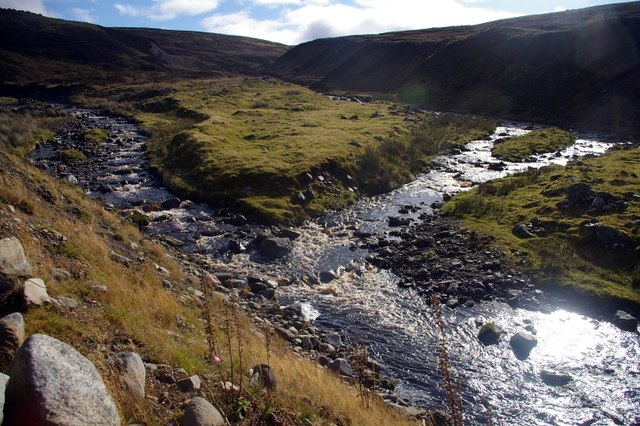
Confluence with the Allt a' Ghille Charaich

The River E is a river in the Highlands of Scotland. It begins in the north-west of the Monadh Liath, to the south-east of Loch Ness. It runs in a north-westerly direction for about 10 km, before flowing into Loch Mhòr. The river has a catchment area of 26.7 km^{2} (10.3 sq mi) which has an annual rainfall of around 1.4 m (4 ft 7 in) giving an average flow around 0.88 cubic metres per second (31 cu ft/s).

Flow of the neighbouring River Fechlin is diverted into the River E. The Fechlin aqueduct was constructed as part of the Foyers pumped-storage hydropower scheme in the 1970s, and can divert up to 24 m^{3}/s (850 cu ft/s) of water, which discharges into the River E over a series of energy dissipating weirs. The aqueduct outflow is approximately 1 km (0.6 mi) upstream of Loch Mhòr.

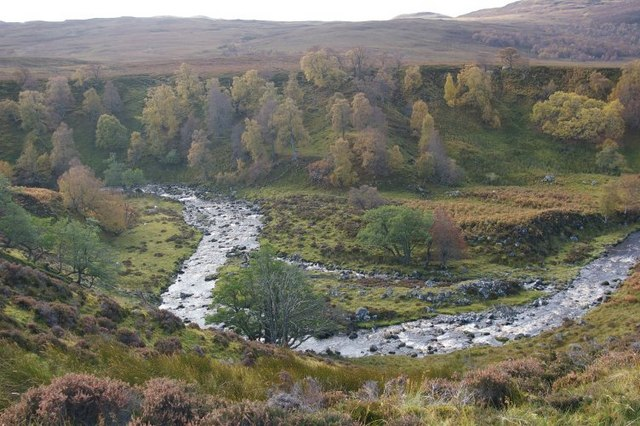
Horseshoe bend in the river

The river has a small hydro-electric scheme. This run-of-the-river scheme has a capacity of 3MW and is operated by RWE Npower. Construction of the scheme began in 2006, and it was commissioned in 2007. It has a single weir across the River E at an elevation of just over 500 m (1,600 ft), with a catchment area of 16 km^{2} (6.2 sq mi). The scheme has a hydraulic head of 287 m (942 ft), with water transferred to the powerhouse via an 800 mm (31 in) glass-reinforced plastic pipe approx. 4 km (2.5 mi) long. Power is generated by a twin-jet horizontal-axis Pelton turbine.

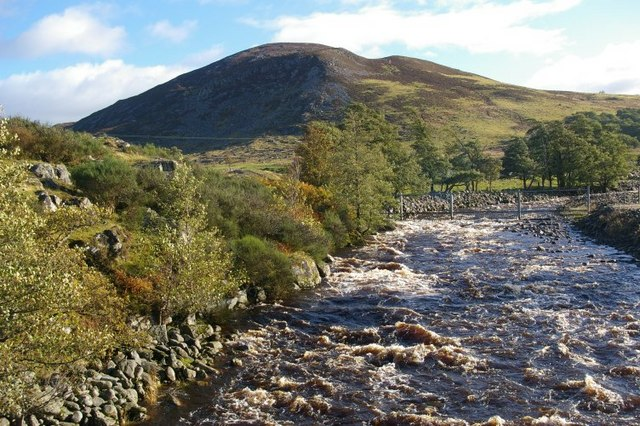
View along the river

The River E is among the shortest place names in the world.
