= Bunloit =

Village by Loch Ness, Scotland

Coordinates: 57.29216°N 4.49480°W

Bunloit: Scottish Gaelic: Bun Leothaid
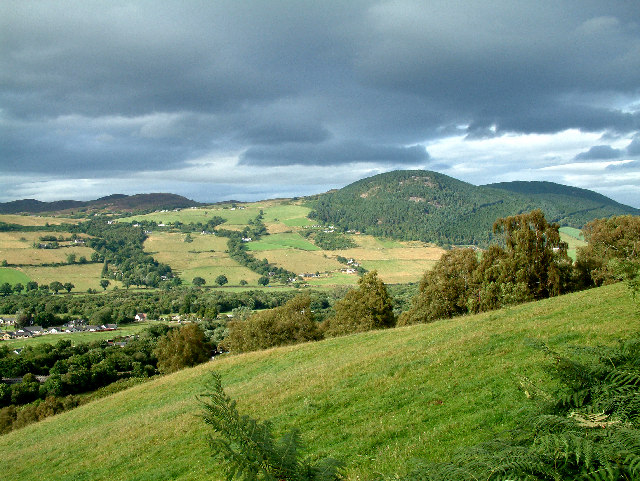
- Lewiston next to Bunloit.

- Location within the Inverness area
- OS grid reference: NH497251
- Council area: Highland
- Country: Scotland
- Sovereign state: United Kingdom
- Postcode district: IV2 6
- Police: Scotland
- Fire: Scottish
- Ambulance: Scottish

Bunloit (Scottish Gaelic: Bun Leothaid) is a village on the north western shore of Loch Ness in Inverness-shire, in the Scottish Highlands and is part of the Scottish council area of Highland.

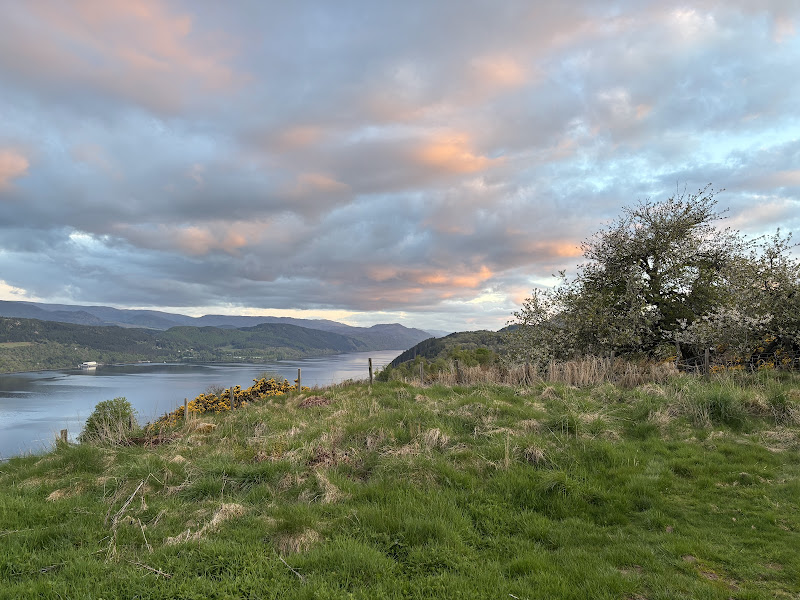
View of Loch Ness from Bunloit Estate, Invernes-shire Scotland UK
