= Loch Ness Toad =

Toad found in Loch Ness, Scotland

The Loch Ness Toad refers to a reported biological finding from a 2005–2007 sonar survey of Loch Ness in Scotland, where researchers from the Massachusetts Institute of Technology (MIT) identified an object as a living common toad at a depth of approximately 324 ft (99 m).

== Discovery ==
The discovery was made public in June 2007, ahead of a presentation by MIT lecturer Bob Rines at the Oceans '07 engineering conference in Aberdeen. The MIT team, conducting a comprehensive side-scan sonar survey of the entire loch, was reportedly "amazed" to detect a target consistent with a toad crawling in the mud at approximately 324 ft (99 m).

The survey was part of MIT's ongoing efforts to investigate Loch Ness, including searching for preserved animal remains in the bottom waters that might explain historical sightings associated with the Loch Ness Monster legend.

The plausibility of a common toad surviving at such a depth has been questioned by biologists as common toads are amphibians that require surface air to breathe and are not known for deep-water diving.

== Resurgence in popular culture and speculation ==
In 2023, the story resurfaced widely on social media, sparking renewed speculation. Some online discussions humorously or seriously proposed a link between the "deep toad" and the Loch Ness Monster, suggesting the mythical creature could be a giant amphibian, such as a Chinese giant salamander or a previously unknown species.

This revived interest connected to broader, non-peer-reviewed theories about the loch's ecology, including the possibility of large eels or relict populations of ancient animals. A major environmental DNA (eDNA) survey of the loch led by New Zealand's University of Otago in 2018 found no genetic evidence of large prehistoric reptiles like plesiosaurs, sturgeon, catfish, or sharks. However, the research detected a "very significant amount of eel DNA" at nearly every sampling location. Geneticist Professor Neil Gemmell stated that while the data could not confirm the size of these eels, the sheer quantity of their DNA means the possibility of giant eels in Loch Ness and that such creatures could be behind monster sightings cannot be discounted.
