= Loch Mhòr =

Reservoir in Scottish Highlands

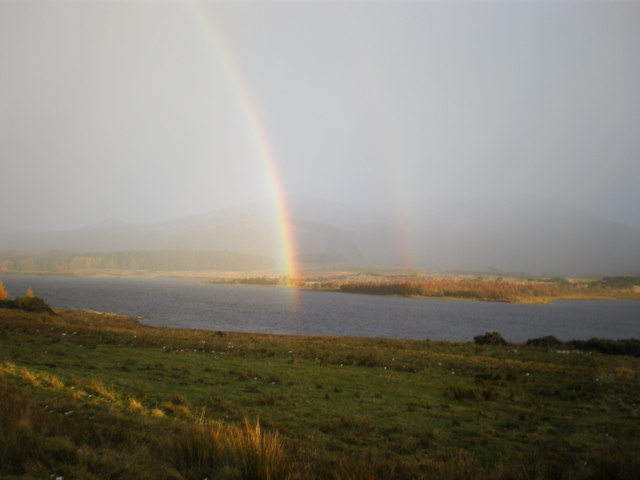

- Location within Scotland
- Location: Highland, Scotland, United Kingdom
- Coordinates: 57°14′46″N 4°25′04″W
- Catchment area: 80 square miles (210 km^{2})
- Built: 1896
- Max. length: 5 miles (8.0 km)
- Max. width: 3/4 mile (1.2 km)
- Surface elevation: 194.23 metres (637.2 ft) (top water level)

Loch Mhòr is a reservoir in the traditional county of Inverness-shire in the Scottish Highlands. Its name literally translates from Scottish Gaelic as "Big Loch". It occupies much of the wide floor of Stratherrick which runs roughly parallel to Loch Ness, around 3 mi (4.8 km) to its southeast. A generally shallow body of water 179 m (587 ft) above Loch Ness, Loch Mhòr achieves a depth in excess of 20 m (66 ft) towards its southern end. It is nearly 5 miles (8.0 km) in length, with a maximum breadth of 3/4 mile (1.2 km) and mean breadth around 1/3 mile (0.5 km). In its middle reaches, a broad and shallow embayment on its southeastern shore contains a scatter of islets. The loch is elongated with a very irregular form, the eastern shore broken up by multiple bays.

Loch Mhòr was originally two separate lochs, Loch Garth in the southwest and Loch Farraline in the northeast. The reservoir was formed in 1896 by the construction of two dams, raising the water level by up to 20 feet (6.1 m) above the level of Loch Farraline and joining the two lochs into one. This was created for a hydro-electric scheme and associated aluminium smelter at Foyers, although the smelter closed in 1967. Loch Mhòr is divided in the middle by a causeway carrying a minor road. A masonry dam was constructed across the River Gourag, 230 m (750 ft) long and 9 m (30 ft) high. A longer embankment dam was constructed at Garthbeg, 325 m (1,066 ft) long and 5 m (16 ft) high. This only had a freeboard of 1 m (3 ft 3 in) and was known to leak.

The main rivers flowing into Loch Mhòr are the Aberchalder Burn, originally a tributary of Loch Garth, and the River E, which was diverted for the original hydro scheme by construction of the Garthbeg dam. The waters of the loch empty as the River Gourag below the Loch Mhòr dam at its southwestern end. This short river becomes the Allt an Lòin downstream of the former confluence with the River E, then joins the River Foyers which empties into Loch Ness via the Falls of Foyers.

The Loch is still used as the upper reservoir for the 300 MW Foyers pumped-storage hydroelectricity facility. As part of the construction of this, some of the flow of the River Fechlin was diverted through an aqueduct. This increased the catchment area by 129 km^{2} (50 sq mi). The catchment of Loch Mhòr, including the River E, was previously 77.7 km^{2} (30.0 sq mi).

In the late 1960s early 70s, a flood study commissioned by SSE identified an overtopping risk at Garthbeg embankment dam. Therefore the spill weir at the main Loch Mhòr dam was lowered by 0.76 metres (2 ft 6 in). In May 2018, an inspection under Section 47 of the Reservoirs Act 1975 found issues with this spillway, therefore the reservoir was not to exceed 193.83 m AOD (0.4 metres (1 ft 4 in) below top water level). Repair works to the weir were carried out between May 2021 and January 2022.

In 2017, options to increase the reservoir capacity were investigated by SSE, by replacing the dam spillway and increasing the top water level by 0.5 to 2.0 m (1 ft 8 in to 6 ft 7 in). However, increasing the water level by 1.0 m (3 ft 3 in) was likely to flood riparian properties. The weir was therefore replaced at the same level, but future proof to allow a 0.5 m increase subject to obtaining land ownership and rights for this level of inundation.
