= Dochgarroch =

Human settlement in Highland, Scotland

Coordinates: 57.43576°N 4.30183°W

Dochgarroch: Scottish Gaelic: Dabhach Gairbheach
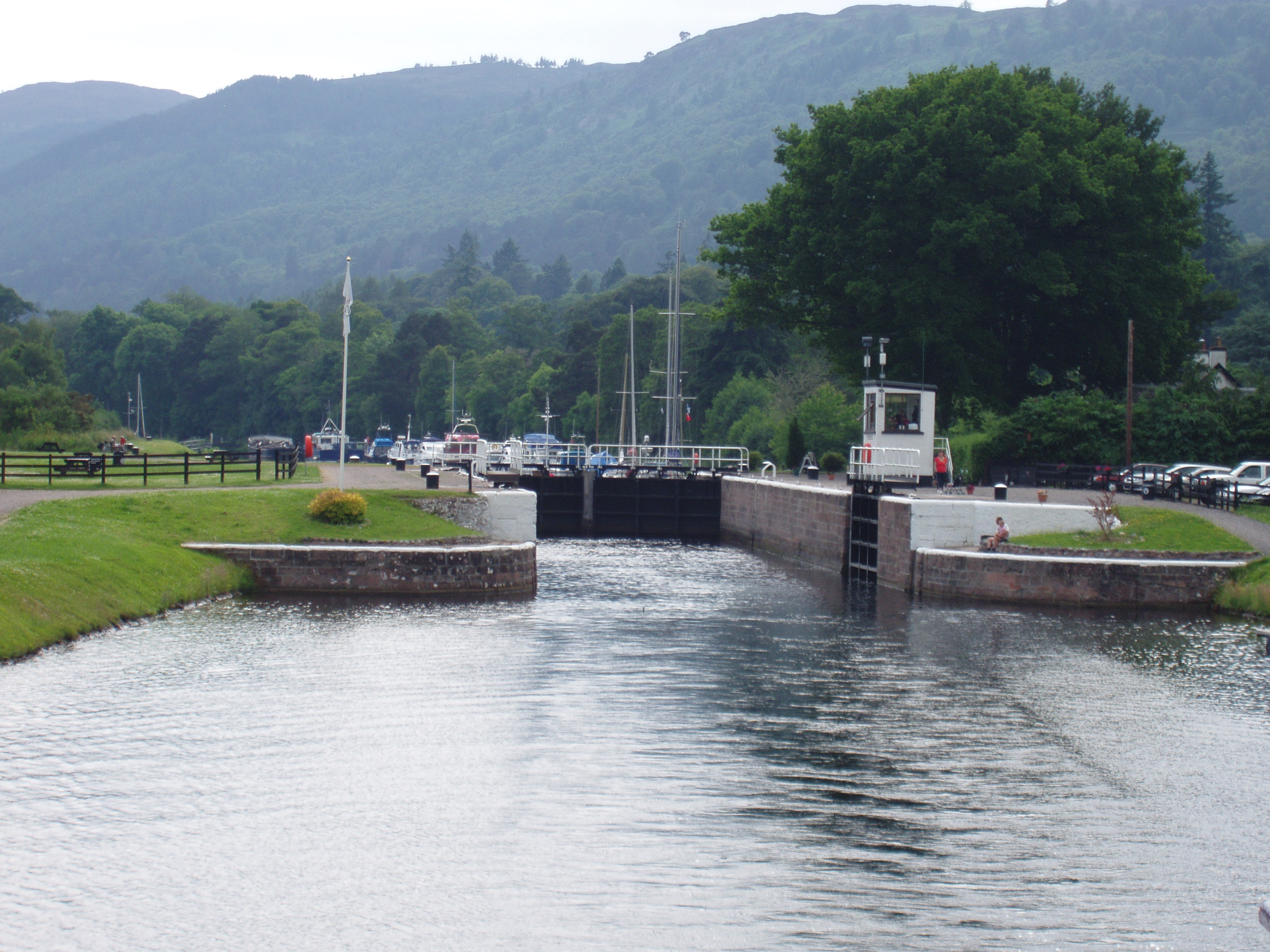
- The Dochgarroch Lock along the Caledonian Canal with its lower gates open. The upper gates leading to Loch Dochfour are closed.

- Location within the Inverness area
- OS grid reference: NH619407
- Council area: Highland
- Country: Scotland
- Sovereign state: United Kingdom
- Post town: Inverness
- Postcode district: IV3 8
- Police: Scotland
- Fire: Scottish
- Ambulance: Scottish

Dochgarroch (Scottish Gaelic: Dabhach Gairbheach) is a settlement that lies at the start of the Caledonian Canal, at the head of Loch Ness in Inverness-shire, Scottish Highlands and is in the Scottish council area of Highland.

Historically Dochgarroch was the home of the Macleans of the North, a sept of Clan Chattan
