= Errogie =

Coordinates: 57.26699°N 4.40667°W

Errogie: Scottish Gaelic: Earagaidh
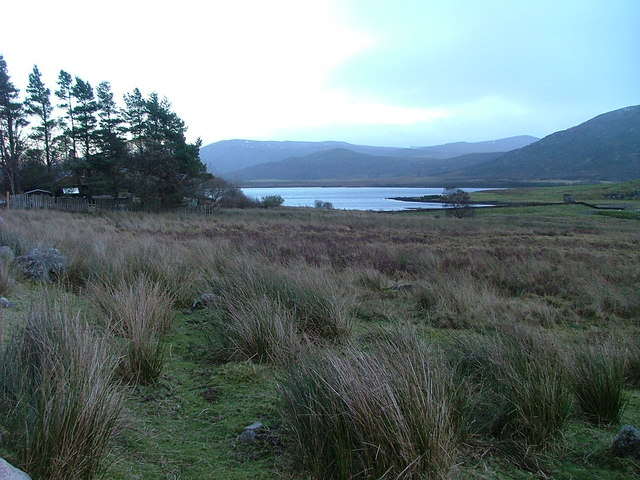
- Loch Mhor taken from Glebe.

- Location within the Inverness area
- OS grid reference: NH549221
- Council area: Highland
- Country: Scotland
- Sovereign state: United Kingdom
- Post town: Inverness
- Postcode district: IV2 6
- Police: Scotland
- Fire: Scottish
- Ambulance: Scottish

Errogie (Scottish Gaelic: Earagaidh) is a small linear settlement situated at the north east end of Loch Mhòr in Inverness-shire, Scottish Highlands and is in the Scottish council area of Highland.
