= Meall Fuar-mhonaidh =

Mountain in Highland, Scotland

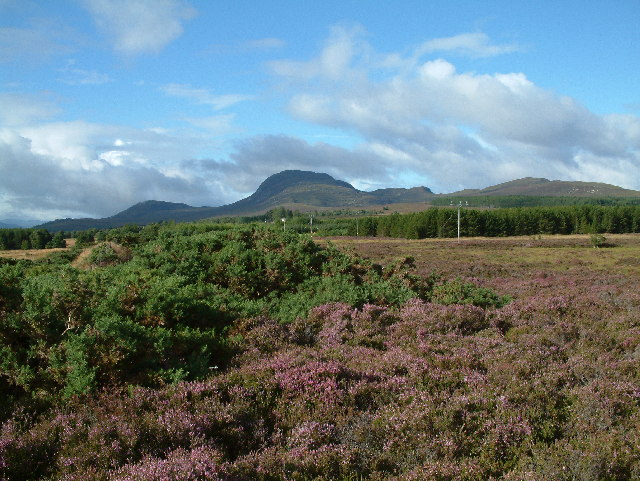
- View to Meall Fuar-mhonaidh

Highest point
- Elevation: 699 m (2,293 ft)
- Prominence: 234 m (768 ft)
- Listing: Graham, Marilyn
- Coordinates: 57°15′52″N 4°33′36″W

Naming
- English translation: rounded hill of the cold moor
- Language of name: Gaelic

Geography
- Location within Highland Location within the United Kingdom
- Location: Highland, Scotland
- OS grid: NH457222
- Topo map: OS Landranger 26, OS Explorer 416

Meall Fuar-mhonaidh is a hill on the west side of Loch Ness, in the Highlands of Scotland. At 699 m in height, it is listed as a Graham and a Marilyn.

Its rounded shape and prominent position make it a distinctive landmark, visible from along much of Loch Ness.

Meall Fuar-mhonaidh is usually climbed from Grotaig, a hamlet at the end of minor road to the south-west of Drumnadrochit. From there a footpath passes through woods, then out onto moorland. This path climbs south-west along the ridge of Meall Fuar-mhonaidh to the summit.
