= Foyers, Highland =

Village in Highland, Scotland

Coordinates: 57.2539°N 4.4947°W

Foyers: Scottish Gaelic: Foithir
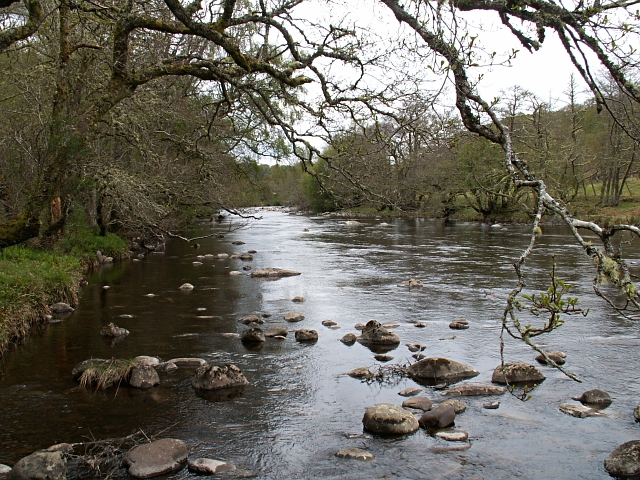
- Looking upstream on the River Foyers

- Location within the Inverness area
- Population: 276
- OS grid reference: NH496209
- Council area: Highland
- Lieutenancy area: Inverness
- Country: Scotland
- Sovereign state: United Kingdom
- Post town: INVERNESS
- Police: Scotland
- Fire: Scottish
- Ambulance: Scottish
- UK Parliament: Inverness, Skye and West Ross-shire
- Scottish Parliament: Highlands and Islands; Skye, Lochaber and Badenoch

Foyers (Scottish Gaelic: Foithir, meaning "shelving slope") is a village in the Highland council area of Scotland, lying on the east shore of Loch Ness. The village is situated on the B852, part of the Military Road built by General George Wade, 10 miles (16 km) northeast of Fort Augustus. Foyers is also the name of the river which runs nearby into the Loch, which has two waterfalls, the upper one of 14 metres (46 ft) and the lower one of 30 metres (98 ft), known as the Falls of Foyers.

== Foyers village ==
The village is divided into Upper Foyers and Lower Foyers. Upper Foyers was originally a traditional crofting township. Lower Foyers came later after the British Aluminium Company built houses for those employed in the aluminium works. The two are separated by the two waterfalls known as the Falls of Foyers.

Since the late 19th century, water courses near Foyers have been harnessed to provide hydroelectricity. The British Aluminium Company built its first hydro-powered aluminium smelter at Foyers in 1896—the first in the UK—and it operated until 1967, powered by water captured in Loch Mhòr. The power station element of the plant was then purchased by Scotland's Hydro Board and redeveloped using a 5MW turbine. Subsequently, a new pumped storage power station, with additional capacity of 300MW, was added, becoming fully operational in 1975.

Foyers is the location of Boleskine House, two miles east of the main town, which was the home of author and occultist Aleister Crowley. The house was once owned by guitarist and Crowley collector Jimmy Page.

Foyers was historically a strong Gaelic-speaking area, with 84.1% reporting as Gaelic-speaking in the 1881 census. However, only 4.9% of residents reported as Gaelic-speaking in the 2011 census.

== Luftwaffe Raid ==
At 12pm on 13 February 1941, the Aluminium Works at Foyers was bombed by the Luftwaffe, causing Furnaceman, Murdo MacLeod, a fatal heart attack, and killing Fitter, Archibald MacDonald, as he walked along the adjacent tramway which took a near direct hit. MacDonald was initially reported missing at 3pm, before his body was discovered 3 hours later inside the Turbine Pit. While initially speculated that he had drowned as a result, it was later determined that he had died instantaneously. The factory was later visited by HRH Prince George, Duke of Kent, who was killed the following year in the Dunbeath air crash. MacLeod and MacDonald were the only people to be killed in a bombing raid in the Inverness area during WWII.
