= Tilting weir =

Water-control device

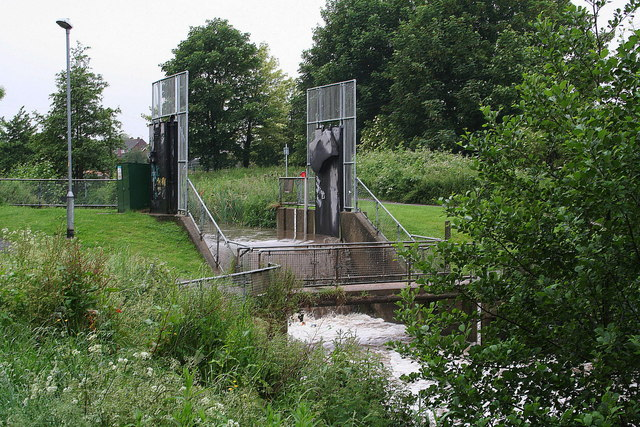
A tilting weir on the Louth Canal

A tilting weir or tilting gate is a movable weir that is used for raising and lowering a head of water by controlling the flow of water to a lower catchment area or drainage basin. Typically the plate or paddle of the tilting weir moves up and down in a narrow duct by titling, pivoting, or rotating on its bottom horizontal axis, which opens or closes the tilting weir, thus controlling the flow of water out of the higher drainage basin.

== Construction ==
There are beamed tilting weirs and beamless tilting weirs. Beamed tilting weirs have a strut, bar, or beam across the top of the tilting weir. Beamless tilting weirs are used where the watercourse could be subject to a significant volume of debris. Small boats and canoes are able to cross a beamless weir. Tilting weirs are manufactured from galvanized mild steel, painted mild steel, stainless steel, or HDPE, and are set in channels which are likely to be reinforced with concrete.

The design of a movable weir must take into account factors such as load assessments, dynamic water pressure, wind, waves, tides, snow, ice, strength assessments of steel and concrete structures, and static and dynamic floating stability assessments.

== Operation ==
Tilting Weir Animated Schematic

Small tilting weirs are usually controlled manually or with electric motors. For larger structures other methods have been employed. A self-regulatory tilting weir that could be counterbalanced by floating weights was patented in 1994. At the time of construction, the 2018 Leeds tilting weirs were unique for being raised and lower by deflating and inflating giant neoprene bladders.

== Applications ==
Tilting weirs have been employed for flood control, environmental water management, and water management in natural and industrial environments, including:

- Maintaining navigable depths on waterways.
- Conservation areas, such as marshland where the water levels need to be controlled to encourage wading birds in Sites of Special Scientific Interest.
- Swamp reclamation: the 2007 Navira Swamp Restoration Initiative employed tilting weirs in Trinidad.
- Land and river systems drainage and monitoring. The Louth Navigation canal and parts of the old River Lud perform land drainage and water level control with a number of locks and pumping stations. A tilting weir controls water levels in the Riverhead Basin and includes a gauging station to measure flow along the canal.
- Controlling the height of water within a chamber at water-treatment works.
- Flood alleviation. Tilting weirs were constructed to protect the city of Leeds UK against flooding from the rivers Aire and Hol Beck.
- Power generation. The Lanark Hydro Electric Scheme in Scotland uses automatic tilting weirs at different heights to control the head and flow of water cascading through turbine-generators.

== History ==
The tilting weir has its origins in the 19th-century drum weir, which functions using the same principles as the 20th-century design. The drum weir was for a long time confined to the River Marne, where it was first introduced in 1857. Early tilting weirs were constructed from wrought iron and wood.

The Lanark hydro-electric plant was built from 1924 to 1927. It has three pivoting counterbalanced gates or tilting weirs.

A mechanical tilting weir that moved the paddles on a central axis was patented by WGJ De Wit in 1988

== Regulations ==
A tilting weir in the natural environment is likely to obstruct the natural movement of water species. Regulations exist to enforce minimizing the damage to the environment and often require fish ladders or elver passes to be deployed with tilting weirs.

Fish-pass regulations that require providing free and unhindered fish passage are a major objective of the EU Water Framework Directive in achieving good ecological status. It is also important in the context of the EU Eel Regulations, which give the Environment Agency additional powers to require screening of abstraction intakes and outfalls.

Eel- and elver-pass regulations require notification to the Environment Agency about man-made structures likely to affect the movement of eels. Where any such structure exists, there is a requirement to construct and operate an eel pass to allow the passage of eels.
