= Lochend (Loch Ness) =

Coordinates: 57.409149°N 4.337865°W

Lochend: Scottish Gaelic: Ceann Loch
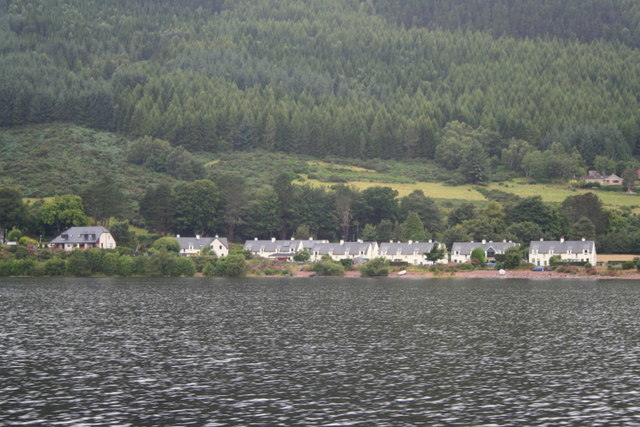
- View of Lochend over Loch Ness

- Location within the Inverness area
- OS grid reference: NH596377
- Council area: Highland
- Country: Scotland
- Sovereign state: United Kingdom
- Post town: Inverness
- Postcode district: IV3 8
- Police: Scotland
- Fire: Scottish
- Ambulance: Scottish

Lochend (Scottish Gaelic: Ceann Loch), also known as Bona, is a settlement that lies at the start of the Caledonian Canal, at the head of Loch Ness in Inverness-shire, Scottish Highlands and is in the Scottish council area of Highland.

It is the location of the Bona Lighthouse.
