= Foyers hydropower schemes =

Hydropower schemes near Loch Ness, Scotland

Foyers Pumped Storage
- Location within Scotland
- Interactive map of Foyers Pumped Storage
- Official name: Loch Mhor Dam
- Location: Highland, Scotland
- Coordinates: 57.2621°N 4.4836°W
- Purpose: Power

Reservoir
- Creates: Upper Loch Mhòr; Lower Loch Ness

Power Station
- Operator: SSE
- Commission date: 1974
- Type: Pumped-storage
- Hydraulic head: 179
- Turbines: 2× 150 MW
- Annual generation: 213 GW·h
- Website https://www.sserenewables.com/hydro/foyers

Foyers Falls Hydropower Scheme
- Coordinates: 57.2553°N 4.4931°W
- Status: Operational
- Construction began: 1895

Power generation
- Units operational: 1 × 5 MW
- Units decommissioned: 5 × 750 kW Girard
- Annual net output: 8 GW-h

There are two hydropower schemes at Foyers, Highland, Scotland, which is located on the south-eastern shore of Loch Ness about half-way along its length. There is a conventional 5 MW hydropower scheme taking water from the River Foyers, and a 300 MW pumped-storage hydro-electric scheme using Loch Ness as the lower reservoir and Loch Mhòr for the upper.

The first hydropower scheme was built in 1895 by the British Aluminium Company to power an aluminium smelting plant on the shore of Loch Ness. This had a rated power of 3.75 MW, and took water from a dam on the River Foyers above the Falls of Foyers, significantly reducing the flow over the falls. The Aluminium smelter closed in 1967, and the hydropower scheme was then taken over by the North of Scotland Hydro Electric Board (now SSE). The scheme was upgraded to 5 MW in 1968, has a gross head of 108 m (354 ft), and is referred to as Foyers falls or Foyers 5 MW.

The Hydro Board promoted plans for the pumped storage scheme in 1968, with work commencing the following year. It has two reversible 150 MW turbines, which can pump water uphill at times of low demand for electricity, then generating when demand is high. The pumped storage scheme has a gross head between the lochs of 179 m (587 ft) and was completed in 1974.

The scheme was designed with sufficient storage to operate on a weekly cycle, with additional hydropower generation from the inflow to the reservoir. It therefore operates as a hybrid scheme, with about 25% of the planned output coming from inflow to Loch Mhòr. As part of the new development, some flow of the River Fechlin was diverted via a tunnel into the River E upstream of Loch Mhòr, increasing the inflow into the reservoir, and thus the amount of power which could be produced.

== Original British Aluminium Company scheme ==
The British Aluminium Company identified Foyers as a possible site to build a hydropower scheme to produce electricity for an aluminium smelter. The scheme takes water from the River Foyers above the Falls of Foyers, it is diverted via a tunnel and cast iron penstocks to the generating station and smelter located on the shore of Loch Ness. The power station originally had five Girard turbines on vertical shafts with Oerlikon direct current generators

To provide a more continuous flow of water, a reservoir was constructed upstream of the intake. This combined Loch Garth and Loch Faraline just upstream, into a new reservoir named Loch Mhòr, raising the water level of Loch Faraline by 20 feet (6.1 m). A bathymetrical survey in 1903 noted that in the summer, the reservoir level may drop back to the original level.

The company identified the Falls of Foyers as a possible site, and bought the Lower Foyers estate, covering some 8,000 acres (32 km^{2}), together with water rights from neighbouring areas. This allowed them to create a hydro-electric scheme without needing to obtain Parliamentary approval, and to ignore public opposition to the effects it would have on local amenities. The River Foyers ran through a gorge to the almost vertical Lower Falls, which was a beauty spot, and was a stopping point for tourists using the MacBrayne pleasure steamers running along the Caledonian Canal from Fort William to Inverness.

=== Construction ===
Construction began in 1895. Loch Garth was modified by a concrete and masonry dam at its south-western end, together with an earth embankment. The concrete section is 690 feet (210 m) long and around 23 feet (7 m) tall, or possibly 760 feet (232 m) long and around 30 feet (9 m) tall. The dam raised the water level of Loch Garth by 20 feet (6.1 m), resulting in it joining Loch Farraline, and the combined storage reservoir, which was 4.5 miles (7.2 km) long, was renamed Loch Mhòr. Water from the reservoir was conveyed along the original course of the River Foyers to the top of the Upper Falls of Foyers. From there a tunnel was cut through solid rock for 0.5 miles (0.80 km) and the water continued through cast iron pipes to the generating station. The pipes were 30 inches (76 cm) in diameter, and were laid in a trench, to be covered with sand. This provided a head of 350 feet (110 m) to the turbines, and although there was some debate as to whether cast iron pipes could withstand such pressure, no issues were experienced. The water drove five Girard turbines connected to Oerlikon direct current generators, which could produce a total of 3.75 MW.

=== Aluminium smelting ===
Aluminium was first recognised in the early 1800s, and processes for extracting it from Bauxite ore were developed during the nineteenth century. The most promising was the Heroult-Hall process, separately developed by P T L Heroult in France and C M Hall in America in 1886-1887, but it required large amounts of electricity. The rights to using the process in Britain were obtained by the British Aluminium Company, which was formed in 1894. To produce a ton of aluminium required around 24 MWh of power, and the idea of obtaining cheap hydro-electricity to produce it was suggested.

The electricity from the hydropower was more than sufficient for the production of aluminium, and some 200 tons per year were produced from June 1896. It was a new product, and with production exceeding demand, the power was also used to produce calcium carbide, and experiments were carried out to manufacture ferro-silicon, carborundum, cerium, magnesium, and precious stones.

The plant at Foyers steadily improved in efficiency, as the Heroult-Hall process was refined, and by 1904, world demand for aluminium had increased sufficiently that production of calcium carbide ceased, and the plant only produced aluminium. However, larger plants built subsequently at Kinlochleven and Fort William were more efficient, and from 1954, the plant was used to refine aluminium produced at those sites, by remelting it and removing impurities, to produce "super purity" aluminium. This eventually became uneconomic, and the plant shut in 1967. The Girard vertical shaft Pelton wheels, which had been installed in 1896 to provide power at 65 volts and 8000 amps, were used until the plant closed.

=== Acquisition by the Hydro Board (later SSE) ===
The site was acquired by the North of Scotland Hydro Electric Board soon after the aluminium plant closed in 1967. The Girard turbines were replaced by a single 5 MW turbine and generator located in the main building. As of 2025, this continues to operate, although now owned by SSE, generating around 8 million units (GWh) per year.

== Foyers pumped storage scheme ==
Soon after the aluminium smelter closed, the Hydro Board developed plans for a pumped storage hydropower scheme at Foyers using Loch Ness as the lower reservoir, and Loch Mhòr as the upper. The powerhouse was located directly on the shore of Loch Ness, with the turbines in shafts below the water level in order to provide sufficient hydraulic head for pumping.

Construction started in 1969, and the scheme was officially opened on 3 April 1975 by William Ross, the Secretary of State for Scotland. It therefore passed its 50th year of operation in 2025.

=== Scheme description ===
Loch Mhòr forms the upper reservoir, with the Loch Mhòr dam across the outflow into the River Gourag, and Garthbeg embankment dam close to the River E inflow. The only modification to the original 1895 dams was to lower the spillway of Loch Mhòr dam by 0.76 m (2 ft 6 in), given the increased risk of overtopping from the enlarged catchment.

The River E was diverted into Loch Mhòr when it was constructed in 1895. The catchment was further enlarged during construction of the pumped-storage scheme, by diverting a portion of the flow in the neighbouring River Fechlin into the River E through a 3.11 km (1.93 mi) long tunnel. With an average flow of 7.3 m^{3}/s (260 cu ft/s), this would result in additional annual generation of 93 GWh. The tunnel is mostly unlined apart from a concrete slab along the bottom. It is 3.3 m wide by 3.5 m high (11 ft by 11 ft 6 in) and can divert up to 24 m^{3}/s (850 cu ft/s) of water, or 4 1/2 times the mean annual flow in the River Fechlin.

A low pressure tunnel connects the upper control works on Loch Mhòr with the surge chamber on the hillside above Loch Ness. This includes a section of above-ground steel pipeline where the tunnel crosses Glen Liath, which is 5.9 m (19 ft) in diameter with a 16 mm (0.63 in) wall thickness. The steel pipe extends into the tunnels by 47.5 m (156 ft) towards the surge chamber 32.9 m (108 ft) towards Loch Mhòr. The surge chamber is concrete lined, 18.6 m (61 ft) in diameter and 83 m (272 ft) high—between 147 and 230 m (482 and 755 ft) OD. Below this, the surge shaft descends vertically, connecting to the high pressure tunnel towards the powerhouse. The 7.3 m (24 ft) diameter high pressure tunnel bifurcates into two tunnels approximately a quarter of the way to the generators, with the final half being steel-lined tunnels generally 4.9 m (16 ft) diameter. These reduce to 4.6 m (15 ft) diameter for the last approximately 75 m (250 ft) long section inclined at 1:1 1/2, then to 3.05 m (10.0 ft) at the machine shafts.

The powerhouse is located on a constrained site on the shore of Loch Ness, approximately 1 km (0.6 mi) north-east of the River Foyers. The two turbines are located in shafts, 35.1 m (115 ft) below the water level of Loch Ness, to minimise the effects of cavitation. The shafts are 19.35 m (63.5 ft) in diameter, their centres 39.3 m (129 ft) apart, with a pillar of rock between them. Each turbine has a draft tube connecting to the lower control works on the shore of Loch Ness. The lower control works have counter-balanced flap gates and smolt-screens.

Loch Ness is used as the lower reservoir, and despite its great size, completely filling the upper reservoir could lower the level by 0.3 m (1 ft). In dry weather, this could have resulted in there being no flow into the River Ness over the Telford weir built for the Caledonian Canal. Therefore, a bypass channel was built at the southern end, with two control gates each 0.9 m (3 ft) high and 7.9 m (26 ft) wide.

=== Scheme development ===
Angus Fulton had been the Chief Civil and Hydraulic Engineer for the North of Scotland Hydro Electric Board almost from its inception. He had considered that Foyers would be a suitable site for a 60 MW conventional hydroelectric scheme, but following the completion of the Hunterston A nuclear power station, the Joint Planning Committee that advised both the Board and the South of Scotland Electricity Board, had recommended that a 300 MW pumped storage scheme was needed next. By that time Fulton had been succeeded by K R Vernon, an engineer with wide experience, that included working on the construction of another pumped storage scheme at Cruachan. He was an enthusiastic advocate for pumped storage schemes, as they complemented large thermal power stations such as Hunterston.

Plans for the Foyers scheme were published in 1968, and they were the fortieth construction scheme that the Board had promoted. Loch Mhòr would be the upper reservoir and Loch Ness the lower reservoir. The catchment for Loch Mhòr was about 30 square miles (78 km^{2}), but this would be increased to 80 square miles (210 km^{2}) by diverting most of the flow of the River Fechlin and the River E into the loch. Like Cruachan, the system would be a hybrid, where about 25 percent of its output would be derived from water flowing from the catchment into Loch Ness, and the remainder would be from the pumped storage element. The project was estimated to cost about £106 million, and made good economic sense, since the cost per kW installed was £35.2, compared to around £50 for a thermal station of a similar size. The plans were laid before Parliament in February 1969 and approved in April.

The rock between Loch Mhòr and Loch Ness is heavily fractured, making tunnelling difficult, and there was only one place where the ground was sufficiently high to accommodate a surge shaft. This was at Tom an Eig, and by following a curved route, the low pressure tunnel could be driven through Foyers granite from Loch Mhòr to the surge shaft. However, the route was bisected by the Gleann Liath, a small lower lying valley, and because the quality of rock was so poor, the pipeline ran above the surface for a short distance. This provided two additional work faces from which tunnelling could be carried out. The low pressure tunnel was 9,400 feet (2,900 m) long. From the surge shaft, a 24-foot (7.3 m) tunnel was excavated, which fed two steel lined tunnels to supply the turbines. These were situated at the bottom of elliptical shafts which are 165 feet (50.2 m) deep, an arrangement that maintained the scenic integrity of the area and complied with the planning conditions that the outlet should be at least 115 feet (35 m) below the surface of Loch Ness.

=== Construction ===
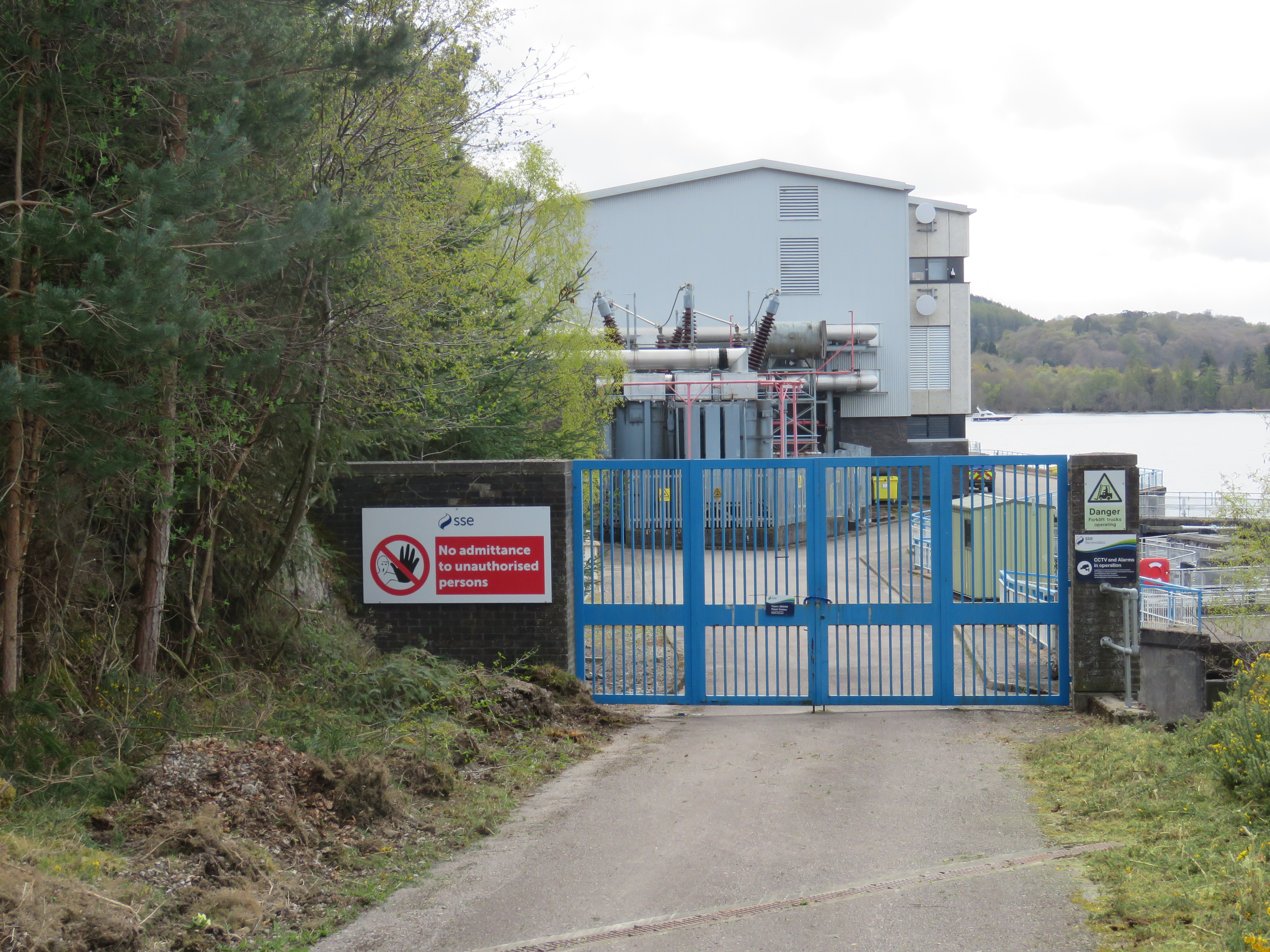
The 300 MW power station with the transformers in front of it

Edmund Nuttall Ltd won the contract for the surge shaft, the high pressure tunnels, the power house and lower control works. The contract for the low pressure tunnel was awarded to Duncan Logan Construction, but they went bankrupt after six months on site, and Nuttall's took over this part of the project as well. The reversible turbines were supplied by Boving and Company, at a cost of nearly £2 million. The surge shaft was nearly 300 feet (91 m) tall and 61 feet (19 m) in diameter when completed. It was lined with concrete, which was achieved in a single pour by working 24 hours a day for 21 days, and using a hydraulically operated climbing shutter. Initial plans for routing the 275kV power lines away from the station were altered after there were objections to the route, and following a public enquiry, the switching station was located some 3,000 feet (910 m) further along Loch Ness, with the cables buried underground between the power station and the switching station.

The new power station is situated on the east bank of Loch Ness, to the north of the aluminium smelter, and was formally opened in April 1975. The scheme has a capacity of 305 megawatts and comprises two 150 MW generating sets located at the bottom of elliptical shafts, plus the 5MW generators at the Falls of Foyers station. The turbines are controlled remotely from a control centre in Perth, and when there is a sudden increase in demand for electricity, the plant can start generating 300 MW within 30 seconds, using 200 tonnes of water per second. At periods of low demand, the turbines are run in reverse, taking power from the grid to pump water from Loch Ness back into Loch Mhòr, ready for the next period of high demand. In order to allow back pumping, water for the power station no longer uses the course of the river, but is fed through 2 miles (3.2 km) of pipes and tunnels which run to the station from Loch Mhòr.

When completed, the final cost of the project was nearly twice the original estimate, at £202 million. However, 60 percent of the increase was due to inflation, and much of the rest was due to the extremely difficult geology of the area, which lies in the shatter zone of the Great Glen Fault. The scheme proved to be the last of the schemes carried out by the North of Scotland Hydro Electric Board.

=== Operation and maintenance ===
The low pressure tunnel from Loch Mhòr to the surge chamber is D-shaped and 23 feet (7 m) in diameter. From the surge chamber, the water fills a vertical concrete shaft which is 367 feet (112 m) deep and the same diameter as the low pressure tunnel. At the bottom, it turns through a right angle, and continues as a concrete tunnel with a steel lining. This then splits into two smaller tunnels, again steel lined, which taper down to 10 feet (3 m) at the inlet valves for the turbines. In 2002, some of the steel lining separated from the concrete in one of the tunnels, on the final section 160 feet (49 m) below the level of Loch Ness. Engineers from Kvaerner Markham of Sheffield, England cut away the damaged steelwork and fitted redesigned linings, which had to be welded in situ, before 400 anchor bolts were used to attach them to the concrete.

The generator sets at Foyers produce power at 18kV, which is stepped up to 275kV at the station, and is connected to the switching station by an underground oil-filled cable. There are two transformers, one of which was manufactured in 1982, and a second which was installed in 1991 after partial failure of the first one. By 2019, the original transformer was in need of replacement, and a decision was taken to rationalise the system, including the replacement of the oil-filled cable to the switching station, as it is the only one left in the Scottish transmission system. The proposed solution will involve building a new transformer station offline, just outside the existing power station compound.

In June 2023, SSE was fined £9.8m by Ofgem for charging excessive amounts to reduce the output of the scheme during transmission network constraints.

== Heritage ==
The main building for the aluminium smelter was probably designed by Cameron Burnett and erected in 1895-96. It consists of eight crow-stepped gables, behind which is a long shed. It has a corrugated iron roof, and the end walls are pierced by pairs of round-headed windows. Each of the eight ridges has a louvered saddle-back vent running along its length. It is a Category A listed structure, and has been listed because the powerhouse was the first use of large scale hydroelectric power for industrial purposes in Scotland.

The dam at Loch Mhòr was built at the same time. It was made of concrete, masonry and rammed earth, and consists of two sections. The north-west wall was subsequently reinforced with additional concrete, while the control tower is crenellated, reflecting the style of the smelter. The control gear for the sluice gates is original. The intake for the original turbines consists of a D-shaped structure on the River Foyers just above the Upper Falls. It is not quite in original condition, as metal screens and railings were added in the late 20th century.

== Bibliography ==
- Payne, Peter L (1988). The Hydro. Aberdeen University Press. ISBN 978-0-08-036584-8.
- SSE (2005). "Power from the Glens - Neart nan Gleann". Scottish and Southern Energy. Archived from the original on 27 April 2023.
- SSEN (2020). "Foyers Substation Works Engineering Justification Paper" (PDF). Scottish and Southern Electricity Networks. Archived (PDF) from the original on 27 April 2023.
