= Loch Ness =

Lake in Scotland

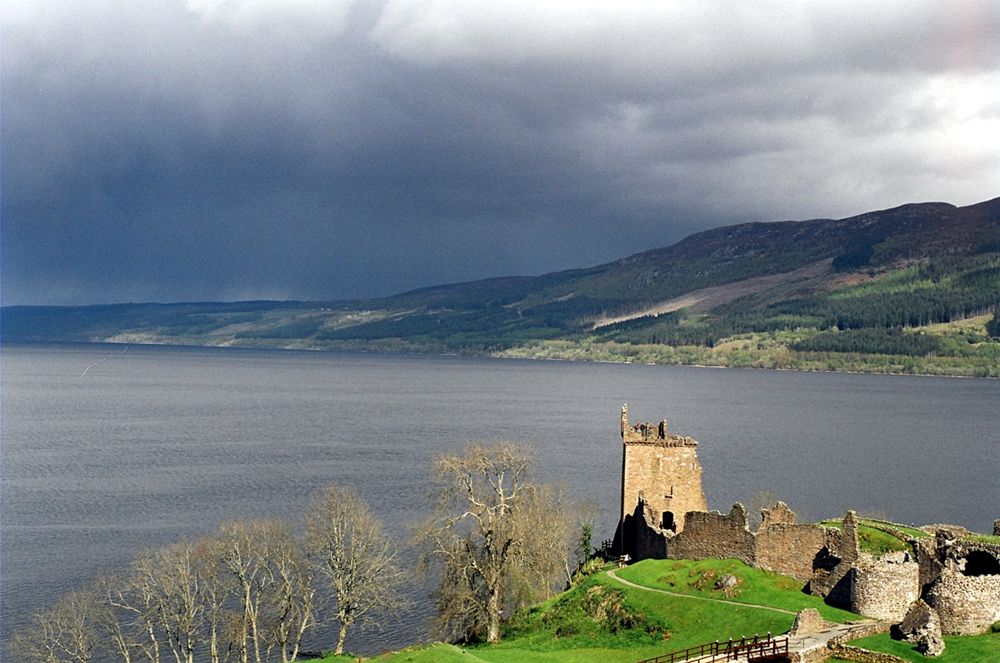
- With Urquhart Castle in the foreground

- Location within Scotland
- Location: Scottish Highlands
- Coordinates: 57°18′N 4°27′W
- Type: freshwater loch, oligotrophic, dimictic
- Primary inflows: River Oich/Caledonian Canal, River Moriston, River Foyers, River Enrick, River Coiltie
- Primary outflows: River Ness/Caledonian Canal
- Catchment area: 1,770 km^{2} (685 sq mi)
- Basin countries: Scotland
- Max. length: 36.2 km (22.5 mi)
- Max. width: 2.7 km (1.7 mi)
- Surface area: 56 km^{2} (21.8 sq mi)
- Average depth: 132 m (433 ft)
- Max. depth: 229.8 m (754 ft)
- Water volume: 7.5 km^{3} (1.8 cu mi)
- Surface elevation: 15.8 m (52 ft)
- Islands: 1 (Cherry Island)
- Settlements: Fort Augustus, Invermoriston, Drumnadrochit, Abriachan, Lochend; Whitebridge, Foyers, Inverfarigaig, Dores

Loch Ness (/ˌlɒx ˈnɛs/; Scottish Gaelic: Loch Nis [l̪ˠɔx ˈniʃ]) is a large freshwater loch in the Scottish Highlands. It takes its name from the River Ness, which flows from the northern end. Loch Ness is best known for claimed sightings of the cryptozoological Loch Ness Monster, also known affectionately as "Nessie" (Scottish Gaelic: Niseag).

Loch Ness lies along the Great Glen Fault, which forms a line of weakness in the rocks which has been excavated by glacial erosion, forming the Great Glen and the basins of Loch Lochy, Loch Oich and Loch Ness. These lochs form part of the Caledonian Canal, linking the Moray Firth and the North Sea to Loch Linnhe on the west coast.

The northern end of Loch Ness is around 10 km (6 miles) south-west of Inverness, with Fort Augustus located at the other end. The main A82 road between Inverness and Fort William roughly follows the western shore, passing through the villages of Drumnadrochit and Invermoriston.

Loch Ness is one of the largest in Scotland, and the whole of Great Britain. It has the greatest volume, and is the second-deepest and second-largest by surface area.

== Geography ==
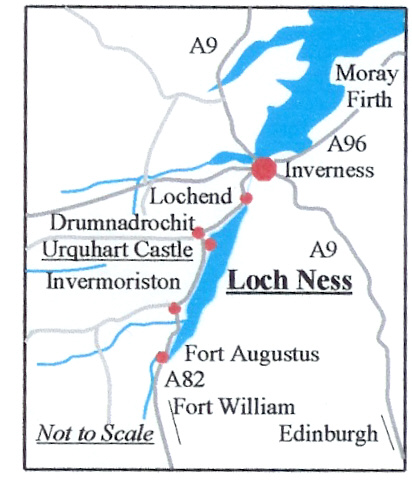
Map of Loch Ness

Loch Ness is an elongated loch located southwest of Inverness, extending for approximately 37 kilometres (23 miles) and flowing from southwest to northeast. At 56 km^{2} (22 sq mi), it is the second-largest Scottish loch by surface area after Loch Lomond, but due to its great depth it is the largest by volume in the British Isles, containing more water than all the lakes in England and Wales combined. Its deepest point is 754 feet (229.8 metres; 125.7 fathoms), making it the second deepest loch in Scotland after Loch Morar. A 2016 survey claimed to have discovered a crevice extending to a depth of 271 m (889 ft), but further research determined this to be a sonar anomaly. Its surface is 16 metres (52 feet) above sea level, having been raised around 1.2 m (4 ft) during the construction of the Caledonian Canal.

The loch is one of a series of interconnected, murky bodies of water in Scotland; its water visibility is exceptionally low due to a high peat content in the surrounding soil. The southern end is fed by the River Oich, which runs from Loch Oich. The northern end flows out through the Bona Narrows into Loch Dochfour; the Bathymetrical survey of the Scottish fresh-water lochs considered Loch Dochfour to be distinct from Loch Ness proper, but capable of being regarded as forming part of Loch Ness. Dochgarroch weir at the downstream end of Loch Dochfour delineates the start of the River Ness, which flows through Inverness to the North Sea via the Moray Firth.

Loch Ness forms part of the Caledonian Canal, which comprises 60 miles (100 kilometres) of waterways connecting the east coast of Scotland at Inverness with the west coast at Corpach near Fort William. Only one-third of the entire length is man-made, the rest being formed by Loch Dochfour, Loch Ness, Loch Oich, and Loch Lochy, with the man-made canals running parallel with rivers such as the River Oich. The canal was constructed in the early nineteenth century by Scottish engineer Thomas Telford.

=== Cherry Island ===
Loch Ness has one small island, Cherry Island (Scottish Gaelic: Eilean Muireach, meaning Murdoch's Island), at the southwestern end of the loch. It is an artificial island, known as a crannog, and was likely constructed during the Iron Age. The island was originally 160 feet (49 m) by 168 feet (51 m) across, but is now smaller as the water level was raised during the construction of the Caledonian Canal in the early nineteenth century. There was formerly a second, natural island nearby named Dog Island (Scottish Gaelic: Eilean Nan Con), but it was submerged when the water level rose. A castle stood on Cherry Island during the 15th century; this was constructed of stone and oak wood and was likely used as a fortified refuge. Rev. Odo Blundell, writing in 1909, suggested that Eilean Muireach may have been a hunting lodge, with Eilean nan Con the home for the hunting dogs.

=== Villages and places ===
There are nine villages around the loch, as well as Urquhart Castle.

Places on Loch Ness
Shore	Places
Northern	Lochend
Western	Abriachan; Drumnadrochit; Urquhart Castle; Invermoriston
Eastern	Dores; Inverfarigaig; Foyers; Whitebridge
Southern	Fort Augustus

At Drumnadrochit is the "Loch Ness Centre and Exhibition" which examines the natural history and legend of Loch Ness. Boat cruises operate from various locations on the loch shore, giving visitors the chance to look for the "monster".

Urquhart Castle is located on the western shore, 2 kilometres (1 1/4 miles) east of Drumnadrochit.

Lighthouses are located at the northern and southern ends at Lochend (Bona Lighthouse) and Fort Augustus. There is an RNLI lifeboat station on the northern shore near Drumnadrochit, which has been operational since 2008 and was the first non-coastal RNLI station. It is staffed by a volunteer crew and equipped with an inshore lifeboat (ILB).

== Etymology ==
Loch Ness takes its name from the River Ness which flows from the loch's northern end. The river's name probably derives from an old Celtic word meaning 'roaring one'. William Mackay in his 1893 book Urquhart and Glenmoriston: Olden times in a highland parish recounts two Scottish legends that have been reported as the source of the name. In the first, a spring in a valley had been enchanted by Daly the Druid for purity, with the admonition that the well opening must be covered by a stone whenever not in use, or else "desolation will overtake the land". One day a woman left the well uncovered when rushing to save her baby from a fire, and it overflowed and filled the vale, forming the loch. The inhabitants cried out "Tha loch 'nis ann, tha loch 'nis ann!" ("There's a loch now, there's a loch now!"), and so it was named "Loch Nis". A second legend, named "The Tales of the Sons of Uisneach" by Mackay and now considered part of the Ulster Cycle of Irish mythology, recounts the Irish woman Deirdre or Dearduil, "the most beautiful woman of her age", who was courted by the king of Ulster, Conachar MacNessa; she fell in love instead with his cousin Noais, son of Uisneach. They fled to Scotland and were married on the banks of the loch, but Noais was slain by MacNessa, and the Loch Naois, River Naois, and Iverness were named after him. Mackay claims that while these legends are not the "true" origin of the name, that many places in the district have names associated with "The Tales of the Sons of Uisneach", and that the same tales have Conachar MacNessa's mother as the river goddess Ness. He argued instead that the etymology of the Celtic "Ness" derived from earlier words for "river".

== Monster ==
Loch Ness is known as the home of the mythical Loch Ness Monster (also known as "Nessie"), a cryptid, reputedly a large unknown animal. It is similar to other supposed lake monsters in Scotland and elsewhere, though its description varies from one account to the next. Popular interest and belief in the animal's existence have varied since it was first brought to the world's attention in 1933.

Several scientific surveys have been conducted in the loch in search of the monster, some yielding unusual results. For example, a 2007 sonar survey found a common toad at a depth of 98 metres which researchers described as a "Loch Ness Toad".

== Fish and other species ==
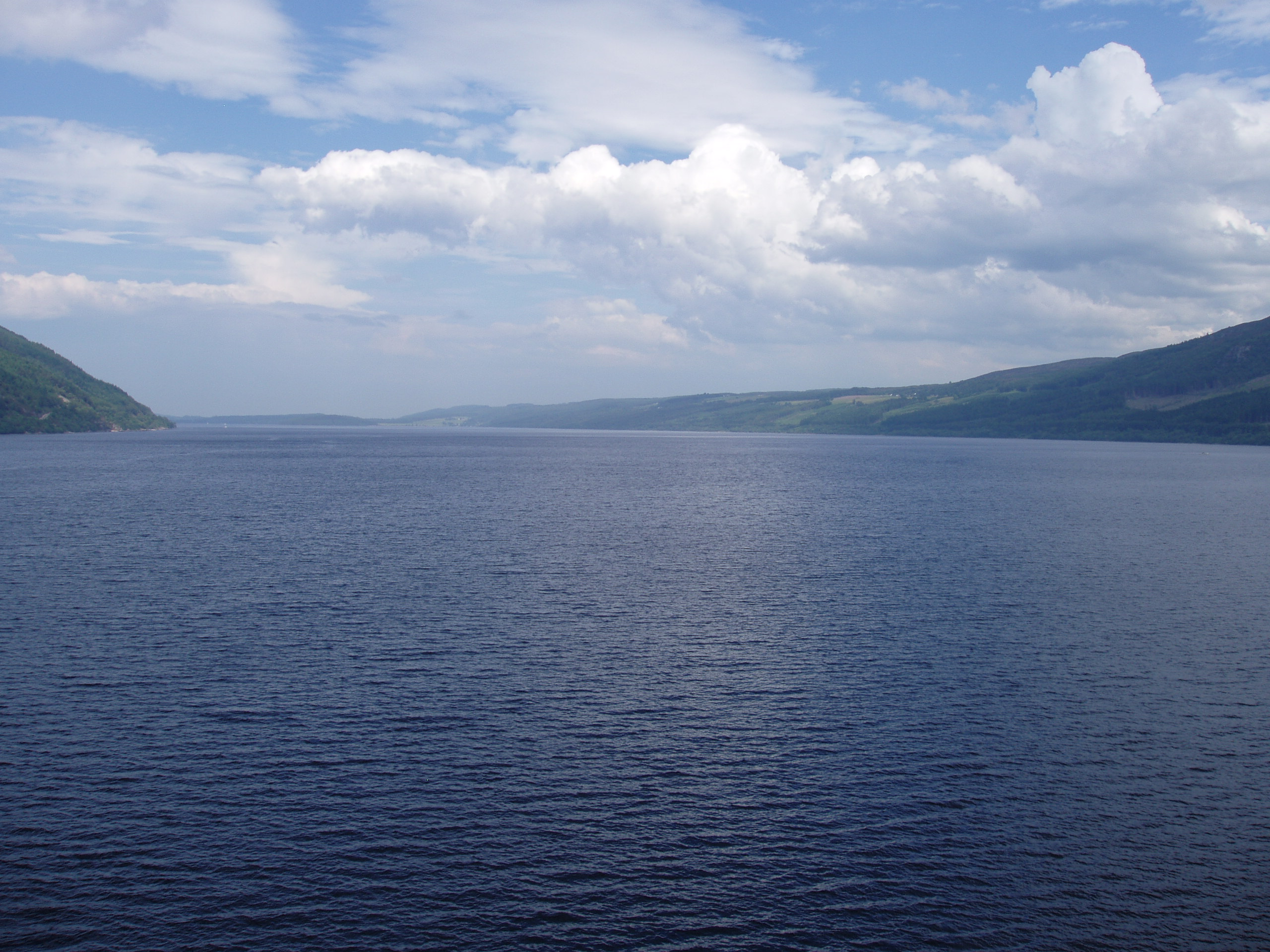
Urquhart Bay and Loch Ness viewed from Grant's Tower at Urquhart Castle

The following fish species are native to Loch Ness. A number of others such as perch and roach have been introduced in the Loch or Caledonian Canal with various levels of success.

Fish species native to Loch Ness
Common name	Latin name
European eel	Anguilla anguilla
Northern pike	Esox lucius
Three-spined stickleback	Gasterosteus aculeatus.
Brook lamprey	Lampetra planeri
Eurasian minnow	Phoxinus phoxinus
Atlantic salmon	Salmo salar
Sea trout	Salmo trutta
Brown trout (ferox trout)	Salmo trutta (Salmo ferox)
Arctic char	Salvelinus alpinus

In November 2026, several beavers were released into the area around Loch Ness. This is the first time that they have been in the loch for 500 years.

== Hydroelectricity ==
Loch Ness serves as the lower storage reservoir for the 300 MW Foyers pumped-storage hydroelectric scheme, which opened in 1975. A smaller (5 MW) power station nearby used to provide power for an aluminium smelting plant, but now electricity is generated and supplied to the National Grid. Another scheme, the 100 MW Glendoe Hydro Scheme near Fort Augustus, began generation in June 2009. It was out of service between August 2009 and April 2012 for repair of the tunnels connecting the reservoir to the turbines.

There are proposals for three new pumped-storage hydropower schemes using Loch Ness as the lower reservoir.

The 450 MW / 2.8 GWh Loch na Cathrach (formerly called Red John) project was approved in 2021. If funded at £550 million, it would store 5 million cubic metres of water near Dores. This scheme was taken over by Statkraft in December 2023.

Plans for the Loch Kemp Storage scheme were submitted in January 2024 by Statera Energy. This would use Loch Kemp near Whitebridge as the upper reservoir, with tunnels and a buried powerhouse on the shores of Loch Ness. The Ness District Salmon Fisheries Board have concerns about the impact of these schemes on the ecology of Loch Ness. In the worst case scenario, filling the three upper reservoirs from empty would reduce the level of Loch Ness by 73 cm (2 ft 5 in). Highland councillors objected to the scheme in June 2025, despite officials recommending that councillors do not object, however the final decision lies with the Scottish Government.

Glean Earrach Energy (GEE) is developing a 2 GW scheme on the western shore, with the planning application submitted in May 2025. The upper reservoir would be formed at Loch nam Breac Dearga, about halfway between Drumnadrochit and Invermoriston. The hydraulic head of this scheme is almost 500 m (1,600 ft), much larger than the schemes on the eastern side. This means it would be able to store 34 GWh (around three-quarters of the total 46 GWh proposed) using only half the total amount of water. Early development of this scheme was undertaken by SSE under the name Balmacaan Hydro, with a proposed capacity of 300–600 MW.

Statera Energy are also developing plans to modify the Thomas Telford designed weir where the River Ness flows out of Loch Dochfour, known both as Ness Weir and locally as Dochfour Weir. They propose to raise the existing weir height, and install a new tilting weir and fish pass. Statera Energy say this will allow the water level in Loch Ness to be better controlled, and will provide resilience against future climate change. It would allow the proposed pumped storage schemes to operate more efficiently, while proving stable water levels for canal navigation. The first round of public consultation was held in November 2024.

== Gallery ==
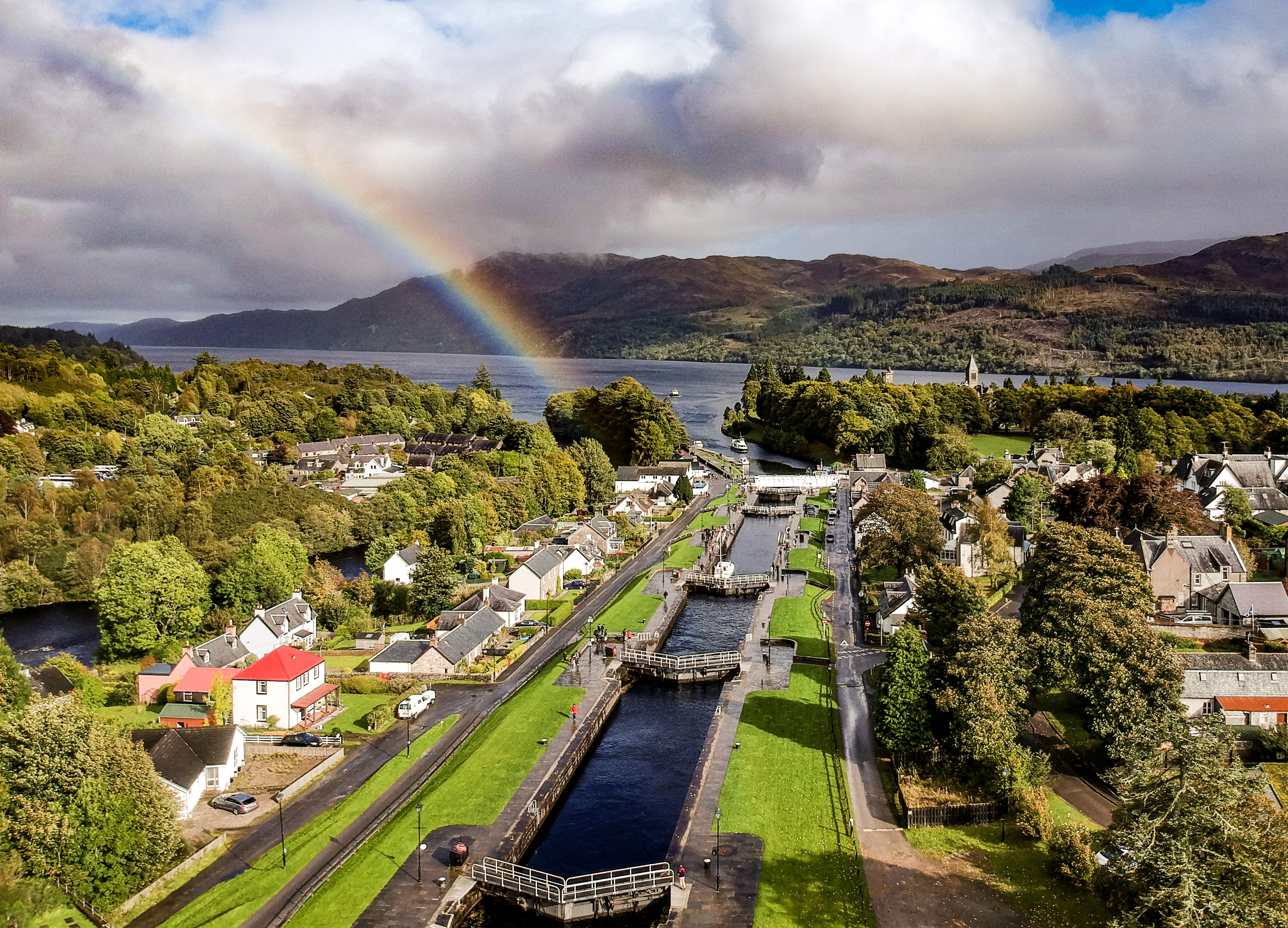
Locks on Caledonian Canal in Fort Augustus, Loch Ness in the background

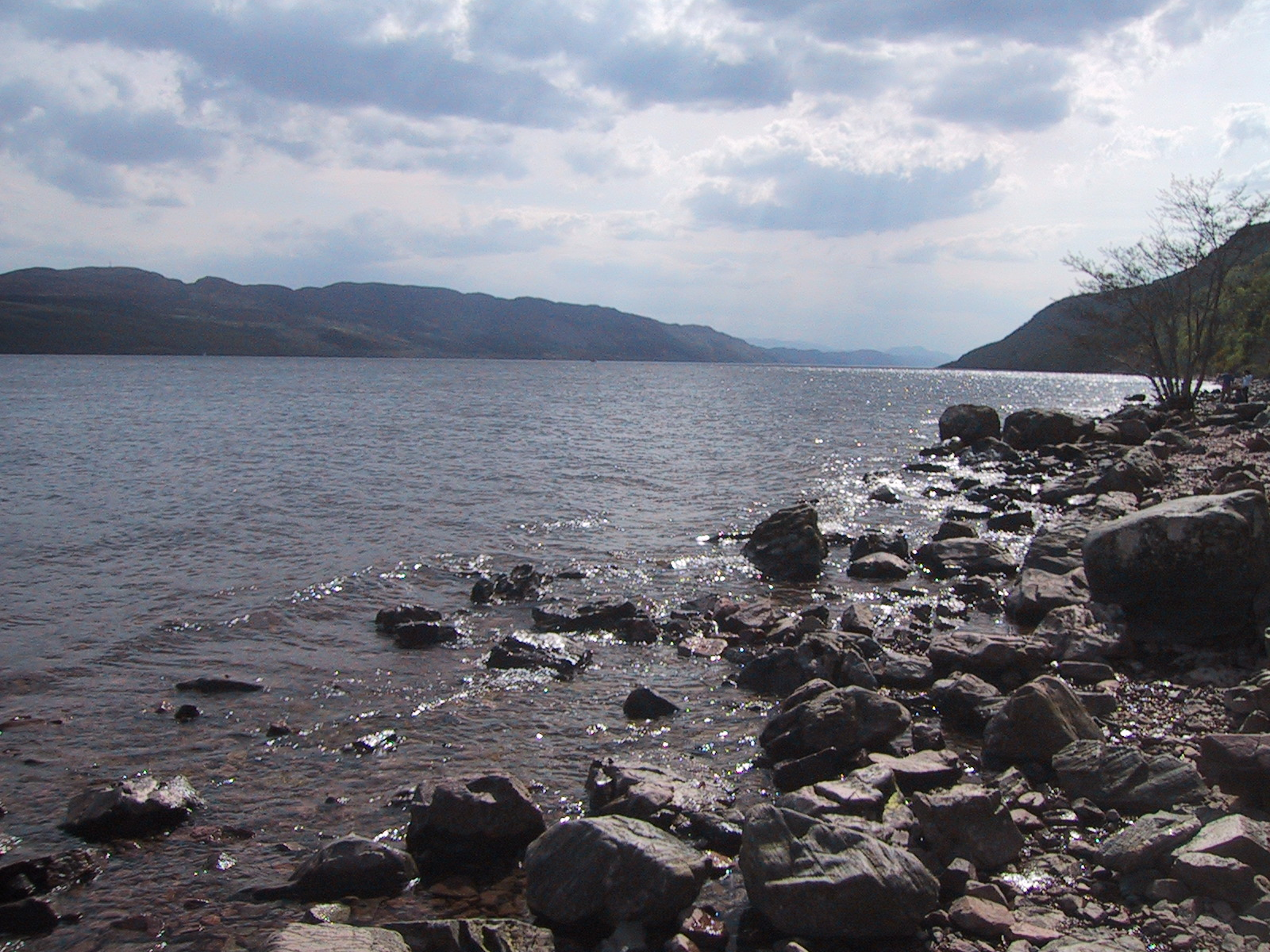
Loch Ness looking south, taken in May 2006.

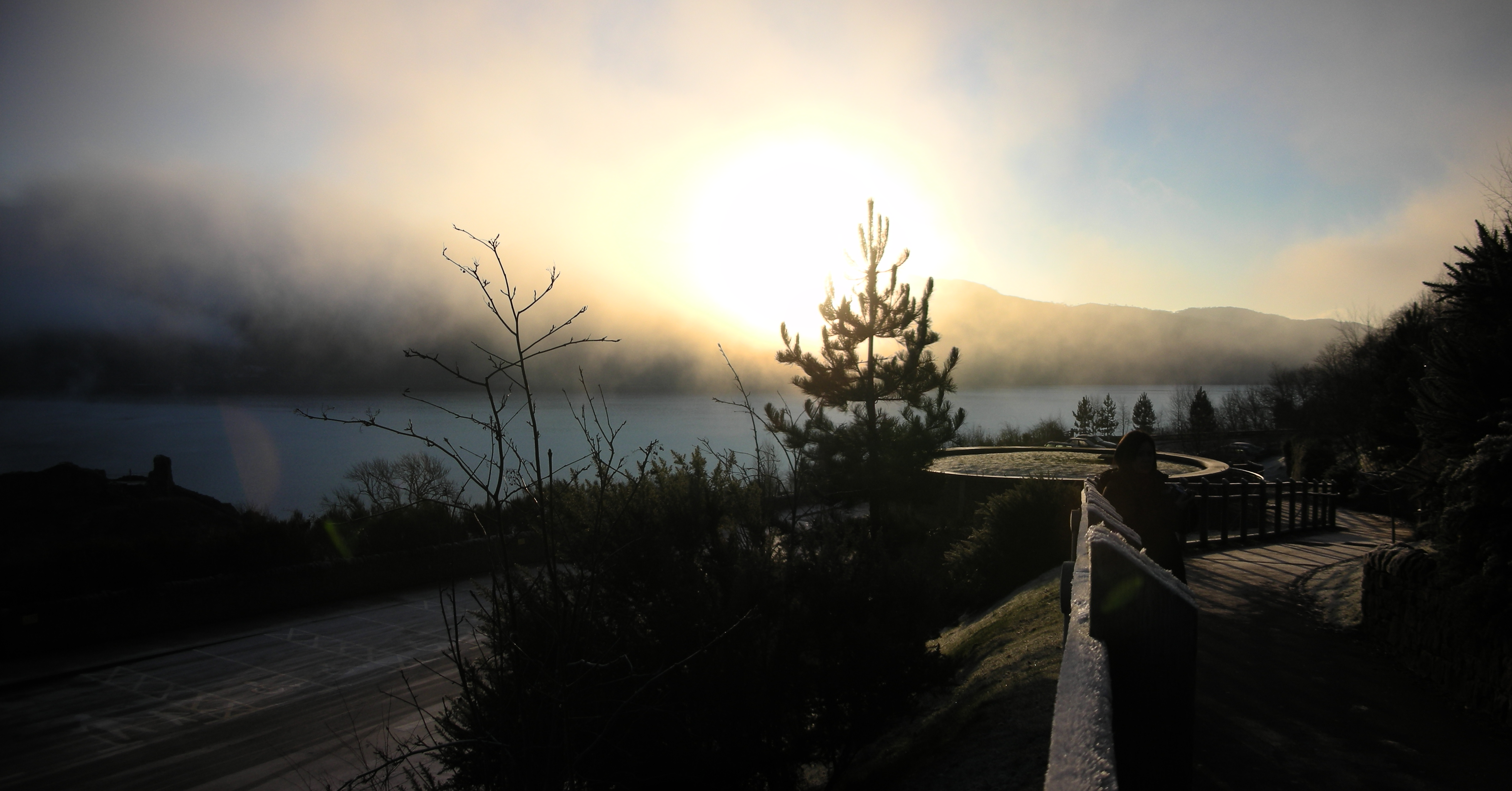
Sunrise over Loch Ness, taken at Urquhart Castle

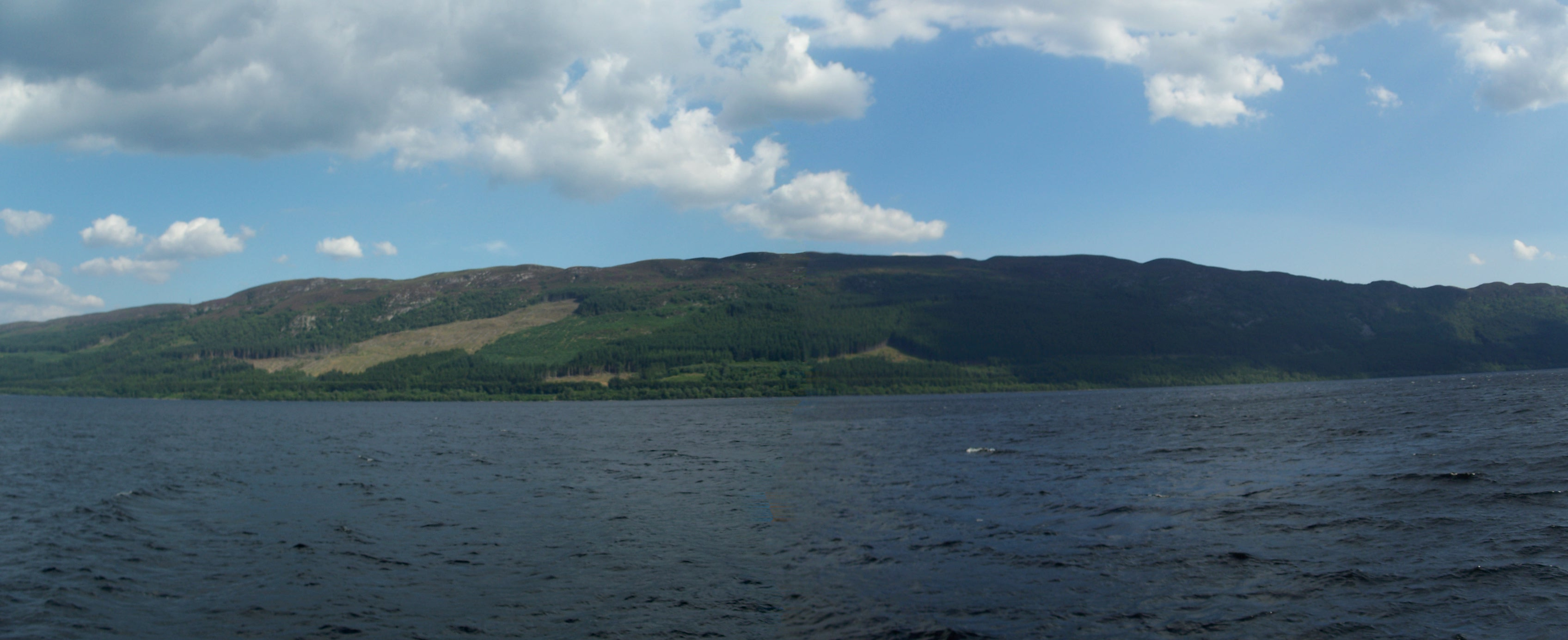
Loch Ness panorama from a ship in 2008

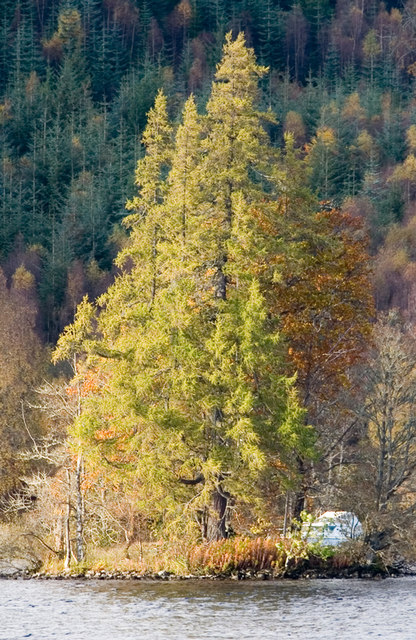
Cherry Island

== Modern history ==
=== Wellington ditching and rediscovery ===
On New Year's Eve 1939, a Royal Air Force Vickers Wellington Bomber (serial no. N2980) with 20 Operational Training Unit based at RAF Lossiemouth, was forced to ditch on Loch Ness after running into engine trouble. Initially, the pilot, Squadron Leader David Marwood-Elton, ordered the crew to bail out, before quickly cancelling the order upon spotting Loch Ness; this second order came too late for the rear gunner, Sergeant J.S. Fensome, aged 20, who bailed out before hearing it, and fell to his death after his parachute was destroyed after getting caught by the plane when he pulled the ripcord prematurely. The remaining seven crew survived the ditching. Fensome is buried at the Holy Trinity Churchyard in Biscot, Bedfordshire. The crash is memorialised on a plaque in a layby along the A82.

In 1976, the aircraft was inadvertently rediscovered by two Americans, Martin Klein and Charles Finkelstein, who were using a Klein side scan sonar whilst looking for the Loch Ness Monster. The pair initially thought that the aircraft was a PBY Catalina 'Flying Boat', before finding its true identity with a further scan in 1980, which revealed it had been further damaged after a fishing trawler had caught its net on the front gun turret. On 21 September 1985, the bomber saw sunlight again as it was raised out of the water at the Bona Lighthouse. As of 2025, the aircraft is currently on display at the Brooklands Museum in Weybridge, Surrey, just down the road from the factory where the aircraft rolled off the assembly line.

=== Records and attempts ===
John Cobb died in an attempt at the water speed record in his boat Crusader in 1952. His accident was recorded by the BBC reporters on site at the time. Nearby, there is a memorial to him erected by the people of Glenurquhart.

On 31 August 1974, David Scott Munro, of Ross-shire Caberfeidh Water Ski Club, became the first person in the world to water ski (mono ski) the length of Loch Ness. From Lochend to Fort Augustus and back, he covered the 77 km (48 miles) in 77 minutes at an average speed of 60 km/h (37 mph).

In July 1966, Brenda Sherratt became the first person to swim the length of the loch: it took her 31 hours and 27 minutes.

On 23 September 2022, swimmer Ross Edgley attempted the world's longest open water non-stop swim in Loch Ness. After 52 hours and 39 minutes he was forced to end his swim early due to the onset of cellulitis and hypothermia and was taken to hospital. The swim was done in support of Parley for the Oceans.

On 5 May 2026, Ewan McConachie gained the Guinness World Record for water skiing the length of Loch Ness from Fort Augustus to Loch End beach in 32 minutes and 15 seconds. Ewan is the son of William McConachie who drove the boat for David Munro's water ski run in 1974.
