= 1836 in science =

The year 1836 in science and technology involved some significant events, listed below.

== Astronomy ==
- May 15 – Francis Baily, during an eclipse of the Sun, observes the phenomenon named after him as Baily's beads.

== Biology ==
- October 2 – Naturalist Charles Darwin returns to Falmouth, England, aboard HMS Beagle after a 5-year journey collecting biological data he will later use to develop his theory of evolution.
- Writer Georg Büchner's dissertation on the common barbel (fish), Barbus barbus, "Mémoire sur le Système Nerveux du Barbeaux (Cyprinus barbus L.)" is published in Paris and Strasbourg. In October, after receiving his doctorate, he is appointed by the University of Zurich as a lecturer in anatomy.
- Theodor Schwann discovers pepsin in extracts from the stomach lining, the first isolation of an animal enzyme.

== Chemistry ==
- French chemist Auguste Laurent discovers o-phthalic acid (1,2-benzenecarboxylic acid) by oxidizing naphthalene tetrachloride.
- The chemical compound acetylene, also called ethyne, is discovered by Edmund Davy.
- James Marsh publishes the Marsh test for the presence of arsenic.
- Hungarian chemistry student János Irinyi invents a noiseless match.
- October 24 – The earliest United States patent for a phosphorus friction match is granted to Alonzo Dwight Phillips of Springfield, Massachusetts.

== Medicine ==
- October 13 – Theodor Fliedner, a Lutheran minister, and Friederike, his wife, open the Deaconess Home and Hospital at Kaiserswerth, Germany, as an institute to train women in nursing.

== Physics ==
- Nicholas Callan invents the first induction coil.
- Andrew Crosse's electrical experiment seems to produce strange insects, acarus calvanicus.

== Technology ==
- February 25 – Samuel Colt receives a United States patent for the Colt revolver, the first revolving barrel multishot firearm.
- December – Victoria Bridge, Bath, England, opened, the first to use James Dredge's patent 'taper principle' of stays.
- Edward Sang publishes a logarithmic method for constructing a skew arch.
- James Nasmyth invents the shaper.

== Awards ==
- Copley Medal: Jöns Jakob Berzelius; Francis Kiernan
- Wollaston Medal: Louis Agassiz

== Births ==
- February 5 – Alexander Stewart Herschel (died 1907), South African-born British astronomer.
- April 3 – Maurice Krishaber (died 1883), naturalised French Hungarian otorhinolaryngologist.
- May 17 – Norman Lockyer (died 1920), English astronomer.
- May 28 – Alexander Mitscherlich (died 1918), German chemist.
- June 9 – Elizabeth Garrett (died 1917), English physician.
- July 20 – Clifford Allbutt (died 1925), English physician.
- September 26 – Thomas Crapper (died 1910), English plumber and inventor.
- October 6 – Heinrich Wilhelm Gottfried von Waldeyer-Hartz (died 1921), German neuroanatomist.
- October 27 – Thomas Gwyn Elger (died 1897), English astronomer.

== Deaths ==
- February 10 – Marie-Anne Pierrette Paulze (born 1758), French chemist.
- June 10 – André-Marie Ampère (born 1775), French physicist.
- September 9 – William Henry (born 1774), English chemist (suicide).
- September 17 – Antoine Laurent de Jussieu (born 1748), French botanist.
