= James Dredge =

James Dredge may refer to:

- James Dredge (minister) (1796–1846), Wesleyan Methodist local preacher, Assistant Protector of Aborigines at Port Phillip
- James Dredge Sr. (1794–1863), English engineer and architect, designer of suspension bridges
- James Dredge Jr. (1840–1906), English engineer, son of the senior, writer on engineering
