= National Cycle Route 78 =

Cycle route in the United Kingdom

National Cycle Route 78 runs from Campbeltown to Inverness. It was officially launched as the Caledonia Way in 2016 as part of the wider redevelopment of Scotland's cycle network. It runs from the Kintyre peninsula to the Great Glen and the route varies from on road to traffic-free forest trails and canal paths.

== Route ==
=== Campbeltown to Oban ===
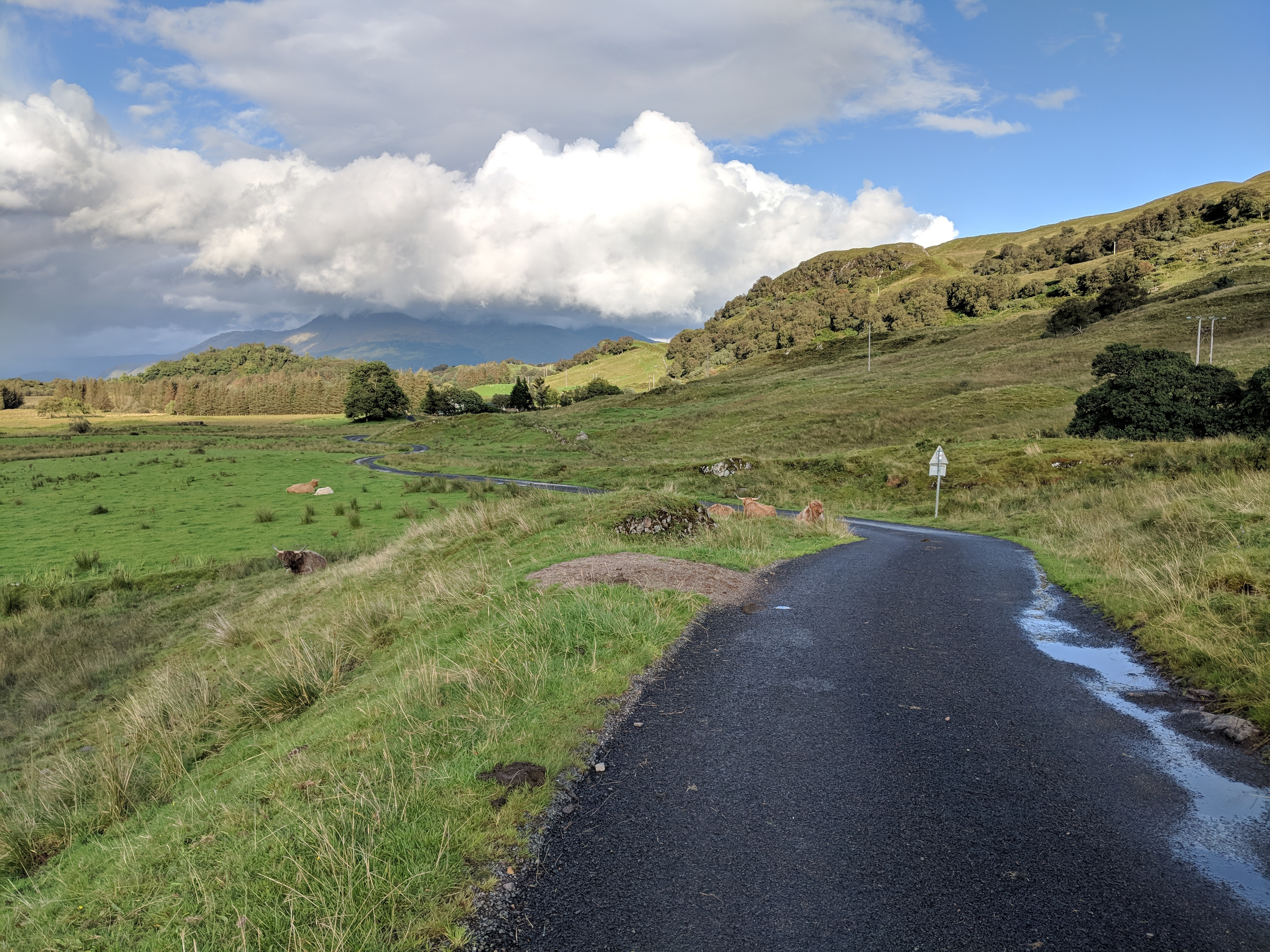
National Cycle Route 78 between Taynuilt and Oban

From Campbeltown, the route follows the sea front northwards, then turns north along George Street and turns right onto the B842 (High Street), which it follows north up the east coast of Kintyre, passing Carradale and Claonaig (where it meets the NCR73), before crossing the peninsula on the B8001, joining the A83 trunk road just south of Kennacraig.

The route follows the A83 to the head of West Loch Tarbert, where it turns left about 2 km before Tarbert onto a short unclassified road, before turning left onto the B8024, which it follows around the west coast of Kintyre, crossing again to the east coast to meet the A83 about 5 km south of Ardrishaig, where it leaves the A83.

North of Lochgilphead, the route is off-road, taking the towpath of the Crinan canal towards Crinan on the west coast, before tracing the West coast of Loch Awe until Kilchrenan. The route then follows the B845 to Taynuilt.

Taynuilt to Oban section runs on minor roads through Glen Lonan, passing Fearnoch.

=== Oban to Fort William ===
A large proportion of the route from Oban to Ballachulish follows the route of the Ballachulish branch of the Callander and Oban Railway, while the last section from Corran to Fort William uses two ferries to follow the east coast of Ardgour.

From Oban the route follows minor roads to South Connel, where it crosses Connel Bridge and follows Observer Corps Post Road past Oban Airport. It then follows the old railway bed until just north of Benderloch, where it runs on a dedicated cycleway alongside the A828 to Barcaldine. In Barcaldine it runs on minor roads through the back of the village, and emerges to run alongside the A828 again, before rising slightly to follow the old railway bed again, this time on the inland side of the main road. At Creagan, it the A828 to cross a bridge, and then re-joins the railway bed shortly thereafter.

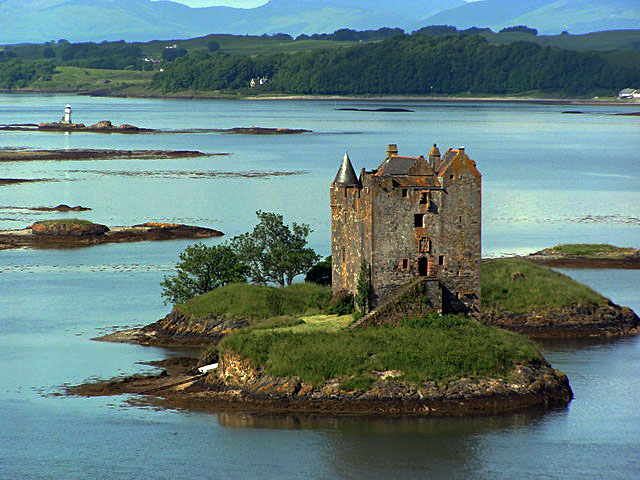
Castle Stalker, near Appin

Across the Appin peninsula the main route continues to follow the old railway line, but an alternative route follows the coast of the peninsula on minor roads past the Lismore ferry at Port Appin. After the routes re-join, they follow the railway bed past Castle Stalker. At the foot of Glen Sallachan, the route re-joins the A828 as far as Duror. It follows minor roads and a dedicated path through Duror to Kentallen, from where it follows the old railway bed as far as the Ballachulish Bridge. From here it is possible to reach Ballachulish and Glencoe Village.

The NCN78 itself crosses the bridge and follows alongside the A82 through Onich to Corran, where it cross the Corran Ferry to Ardgour. Here it follows the A861 northwards along the west shore of Loch Linnhe as far as Camusnagaul, from where a passenger / cyclist ferry connects to Fort William.

=== Fort William to Inverness ===
Between Fort William and Inverness NCR 78 generally follows the Great Glen.

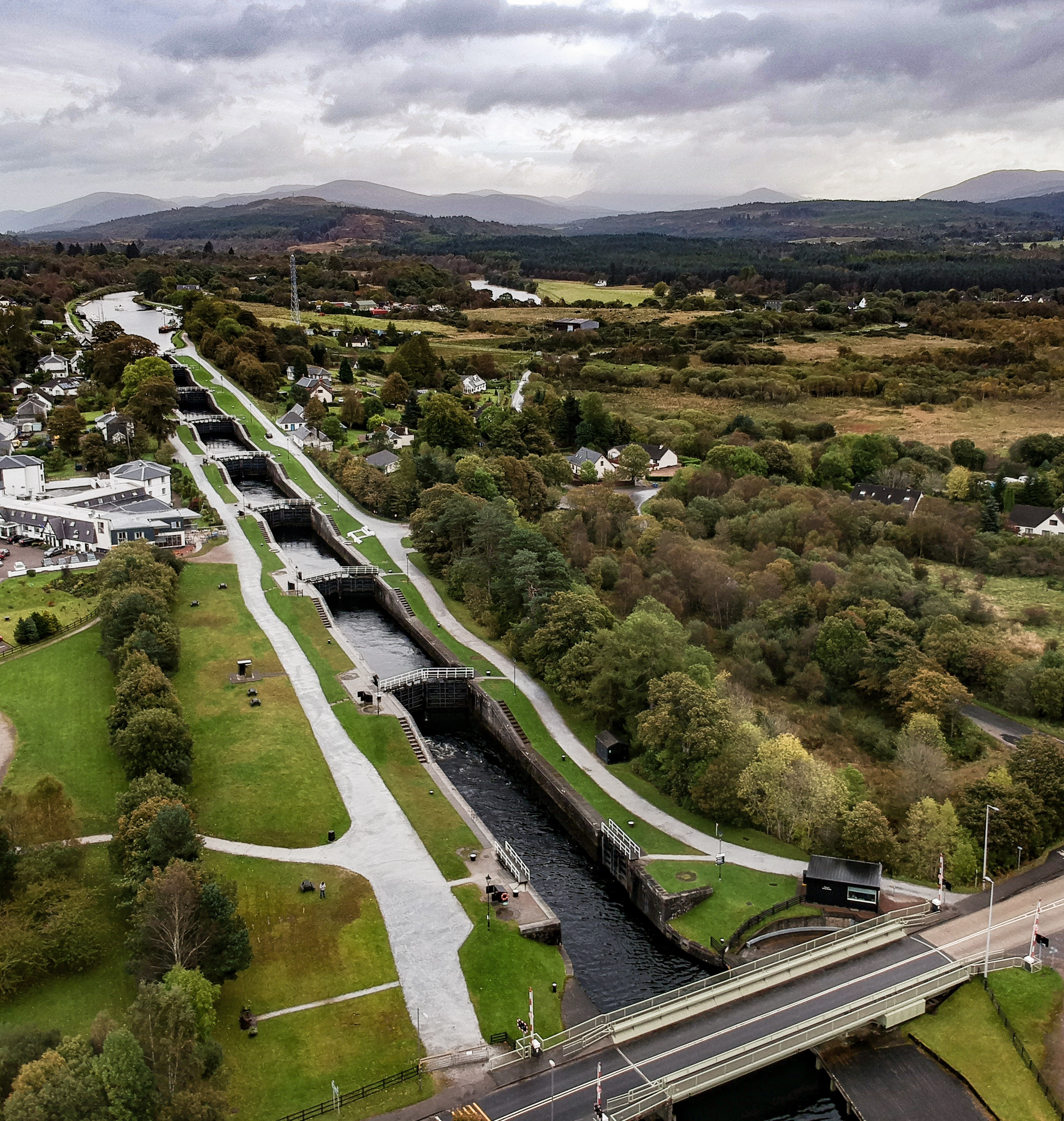
Neptune's Staircase, looking east, with NCR 78 on the right

In Fort William the route runs along the seafront by the A82 until the start of the Great Glen Way, which it follows across the River Nevis as it enters the mouth of the River Lochy. It follows Wades Road and Locheil Road through Inverlochy, and then runs alongside the Mallaig railway line and crosses a pedestrian bridge over the River Lochy beside the railway. Turning left onto Kilmallie Road, it passes Lochyside and then turns to run along the head of Loch Linnhe to the sea lock of the Caledonian Canal. From there it follows the canal towpath to Banavie, continues along the south-east side of the canal past Neptune's Staircase and onwards to Gairlochy.

At Gairlochy it crosses the canal and follows the B8005 along the north west shore of Loch Lochy through Bunarkaig to Clunes, where it leaves the B8005 onto a minor road, and then a track which follows close to the shore of Loch Lochy for 12 km. It skirts the head of the loch and crosses the canal, following the towpath for 2.5 km to North Laggan, where it cross the A82 and follows an old railway bed on the south east shore of Loch Oich for 7 km. It then crosses the A82 again, and follows the canal towpath for 8 km to Fort Augustus.

The route leaves Fort Augustus on Glendoe Road, and then climbs to over 300m, following one of General Wade's military roads (the B862) past Whitebridge, and thence by the B852 down to Foyers on the south east shore of Loch Ness. From there it follows the B852 for 19 km to the north end of Loch Ness, where it follows a minor road, the B852 again, and another minor road to enter the outskirts of Inverness at Lochardil Woods. From there it follows Holm Road, Dores Road, Island Bank Road and Haugh Road along the River Ness into Inverness town centre.
