= A82 road =

Major road in Scotland from Glasgow to Inverness

Coordinates: 55.8698°N 4.2674°W

A82

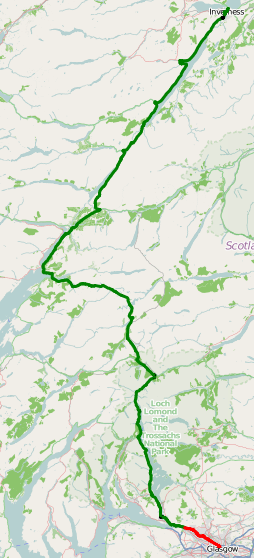

Route information
- Length: 167 mi (269 km)
- History: Classified as A82 in 1923; Specific sections built from 1724 – present

Major junctions
- From: Glasgow
- M8; A898 (near Erskine Bridge); A83 (Tarbet); A85 (Crianlarich – Tyndrum); A828 (Ballachulish Bridge); A830 (Fort William); A86 (Spean Bridge); A87 (Invergarry); A887 (Invermoriston); A9
- To: Inverness

Location
- Country: United Kingdom
- Primary destinations: Glasgow; Erskine Bridge; Dumbarton; Crianlarich; Fort William; Fort Augustus; Inverness

Road network
- Roads in the United Kingdom; Motorways; A and B road zones
← A81	→ A83

The A82 is a major road in Scotland that runs from Glasgow to Inverness via Fort William. It is one of the principal north-south routes in Scotland and is mostly a trunk road managed by Transport Scotland, who view it as an important link from the Central Belt to the Scottish Highlands and beyond. The road passes close to numerous landmarks, including Loch Lomond, Rannoch Moor, Glen Coe, the Ballachulish Bridge, Ben Nevis, the Commando Memorial, Loch Ness, and Urquhart Castle. Along with the A9 and the A90 it is one of the three major north–south trunk roads connecting the Central Belt to the North.

The route is derived in several places from the military roads constructed through the Highlands by General George Wade and Major William Caulfeild in the 18th century, along with later roads constructed by Thomas Telford in the 19th. The modern route is based on that designed by Telford, but with a number of improvements primarily dating from the 1920s and 30s. These include a diversion across Rannoch Moor, and another around Loch Leven which was subsequently replaced by the Ballachulish Bridge.

Several travel guides have praised individual parts of the road, such as the section from Tyndrum to Glencoe across Rannoch Moor, as providing memorable driving experiences. Tourists find the A82 a popular route because of its scenery, and it serves as a main artery for commercial and heavy goods traffic. Transport Scotland have publicly declared a commitment to improve congestion and safety along the road. Some sections are occasionally closed for maintenance, which has resulted in strong protest from the local community, and the road has been criticised for its poor accident record.

== Route ==
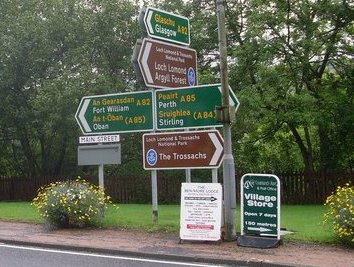
A set of bilingual signs on the A82 in Crianlarich

At 167 miles (269 km), the A82 is the second longest A-road in Scotland, after the A9, and has been described as the "slower but more scenic route" of the two. Initial sections of the road were built by General George Wade from 1724 onwards, though much of the current route was constructed by Thomas Telford in the 19th century.

The A82 was one of the first trunk roads, which were created in 1936, and has historically been described in official government documentation as part of the "London – Carlisle – Glasgow – Inverness Trunk Road" in which the A6 and A74 made up the rest of the route. On 1 April 1996, however, the section from Glasgow to the Dalnottar Interchange with the A898 was detrunked. The main length of the A82, as managed by Transport Scotland, is now described in statutory instruments and orders as the "Dalnottar – Inverness Trunk Road". From Glasgow to Dalnottar, the route is now the responsibility of Glasgow City Council and West Dunbartonshire Council in their respective areas.

The A82 runs through some of the Gaelic-speaking areas in Scotland, known as the Gàidhealtachd. In 2003, the Scottish Government announced that it would install bilingual signs on a number of trunk roads, including the A82 from Tarbet to Inverness. Transport Minister Lewis Macdonald hoped that the signs would improve the tourism experience in the Highlands, as well as improve awareness of Scottish Gaelic.

=== St George's Cross – Alexandria ===
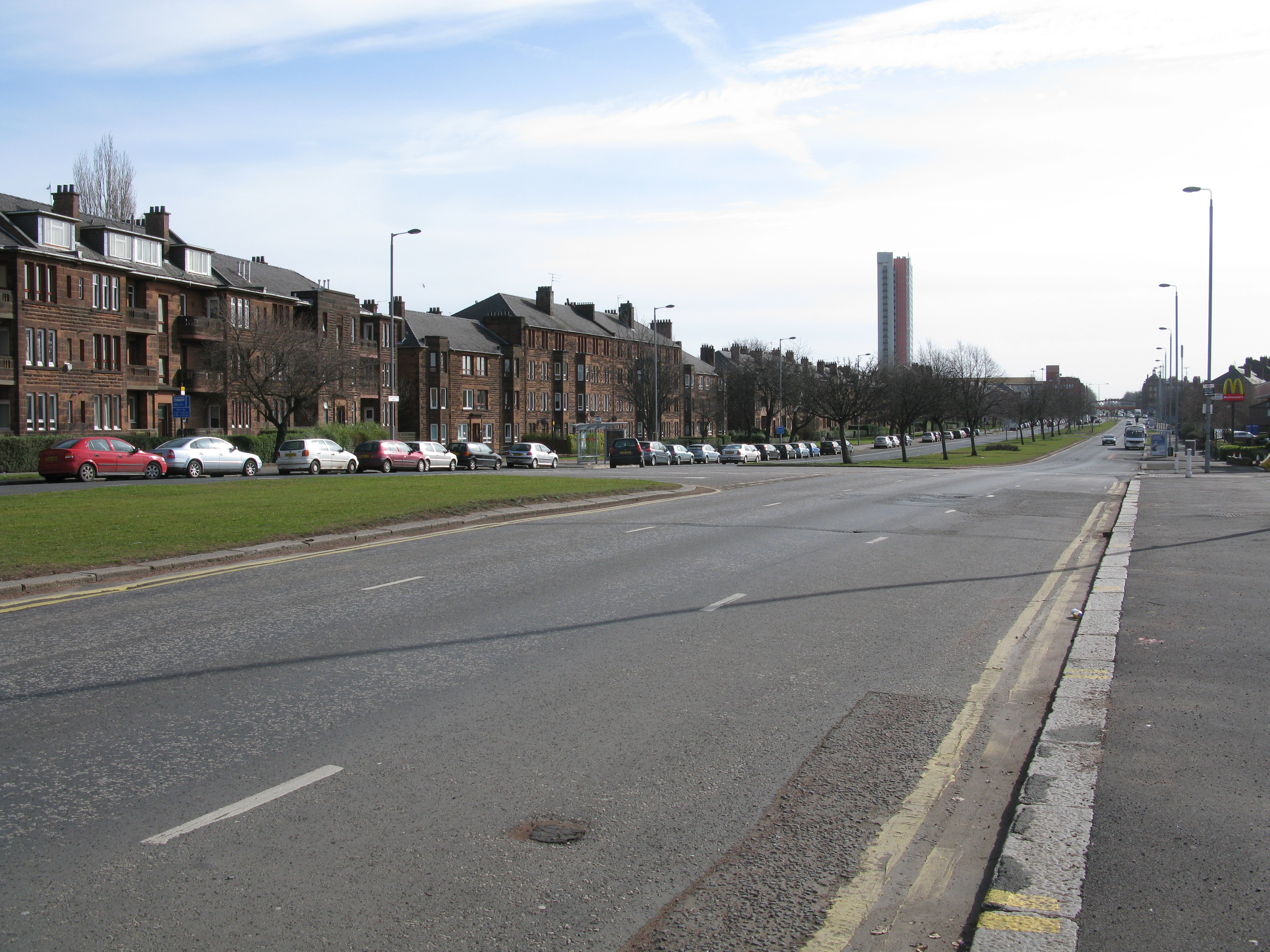
A82 Great Western Road, Glasgow – a key transport corridor towards Dumbarton. Two sections were constructed – the first in the early 19th century, the second in the 1920s.

The A82 begins in the St George's Cross area of central Glasgow, at a junction with the M8 and the A804. From here, it heads in a northwest direction along the Great Western Road for three miles (five kilometres) towards Anniesland Cross and passes a number of the city's terraces, including Alexander "Greek" Thomson's Great Western Terrace, constructed in 1867, and Devonshire Terrace before widening to dual carriageway at Kelvinside. The road here was originally built as a turnpike road in 1816 and widened to its current state in the early 1970s. All the trees along the route were preserved owing to environmental concerns. The Great Western Road has been described by Tam Galbraith as "the most noble entry to any city in Europe."

The road continues beyond Anniesland Cross as an extension of the Great Western Road, which was constructed between 1922 and 1924, making it easier to widen to dual carriageway in the 1970s than the earlier 19th century section. It approaches a freeflow junction with the A898 from Erskine Bridge and becomes a high quality dual carriageway route through Dumbarton before running to the west of Alexandria and Bonhill on a bypass constructed in the late 1960s. This dual carriageway ends at the Balloch Roundabout near the western shore of Loch Lomond, where the road enters the Loch Lomond and The Trossachs National Park.

=== Alexandria – Crianlarich ===
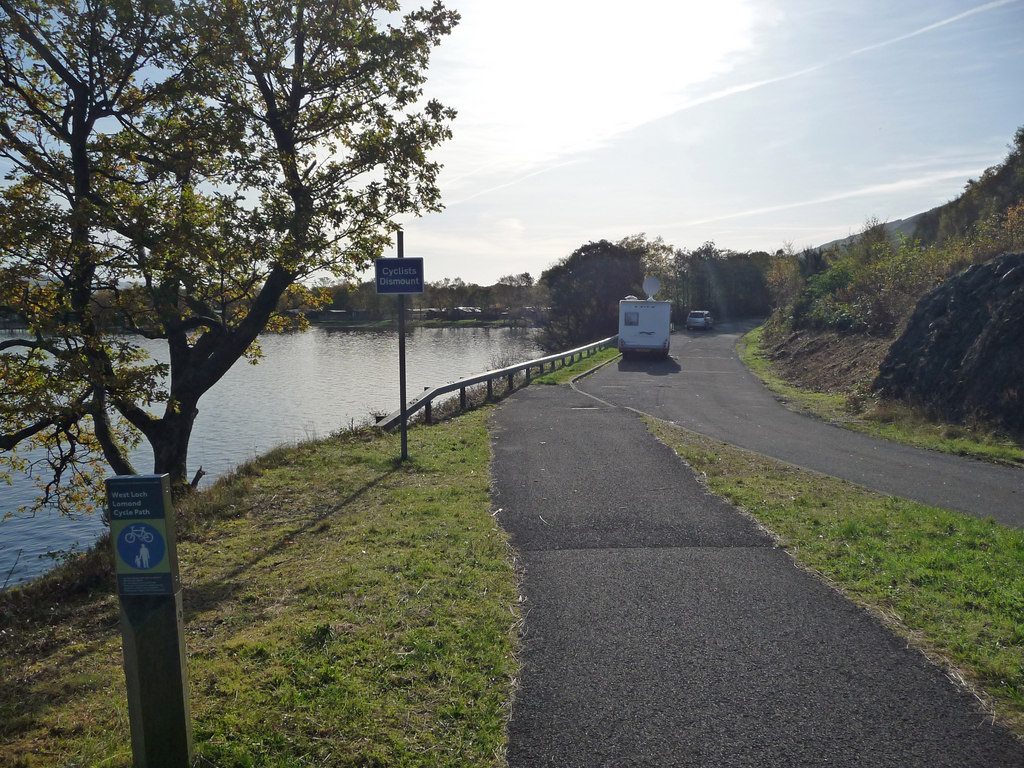
A former section of the A82 next to Loch Lomond, which is now a layby. The road was extensively rerouted and widened in the 1980s.

The A82 follows the Luss Road along the western shores of the loch, through Arden to Luss. Toward Crianlarich, it follows the general route of the Old Military Road that runs along the shoreline in several places, but it generally keeps some distance to the west. Much of this section of the road was widened to a high quality single carriageway standard over the 1980s, at an estimated cost of £24 million (£82 million as of 2025), while Luss itself is now bypassed to the west of the village along a single carriageway bypass constructed between 1990 and 1992.

At Tarbet, the A83 branches west to Campbeltown while the A82 continues to the north end of the loch. This part of the road is currently of a lower standard than the sections further south. It is sandwiched between the shoreline of the loch and the mountains to the west, and it runs generally alongside the West Highland Line. The road narrows to less than 7.3 metres (24 ft) in places and causes significant problems for heavy goods vehicles (HGVs), which have to negotiate tight bends and the narrow carriageway width. At Pulpit rock, the road was single-track, with traffic flow controlled by traffic lights for over 30 years. The road was widened in 2015 as part of a £9 million improvement programme, including a new viaduct bringing the carriageway width to modern standards.

The north end of the loch is at Ardlui, after which the A82 continues to follow the Highland Line along Glen Falloch, a typical glacial valley, towards Crianlarich. The road runs to the west of Crianlarich village itself on a 0.81-mile (1.3 km) bypass completed in 2015.

=== Crianlarich – Glencoe ===
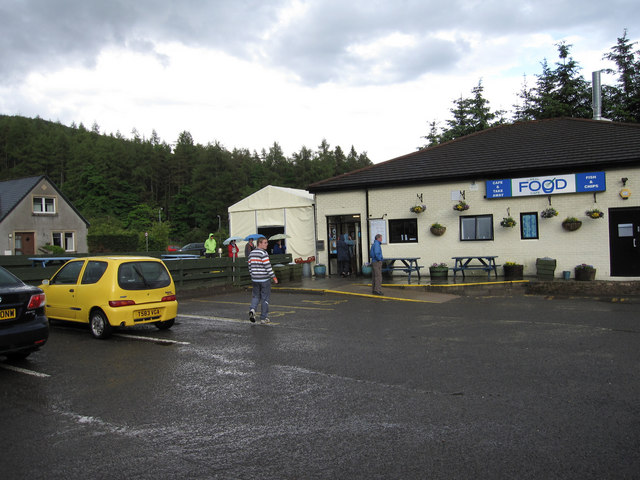
The Real Food Cafe, just off the A82 in Tyndrum

The A82 and A85 share the same route for 5 miles (8.0 km) between Crianlarich and Tyndrum. Although Crianlarich has a larger community, Tyndrum is equally well catered for motorists, particularly HGV drivers, and contains the Real Food Cafe, a transport cafe that stays open until 10 p.m. The cafe caters not only to motorists but also to walkers along the West Highland Way.

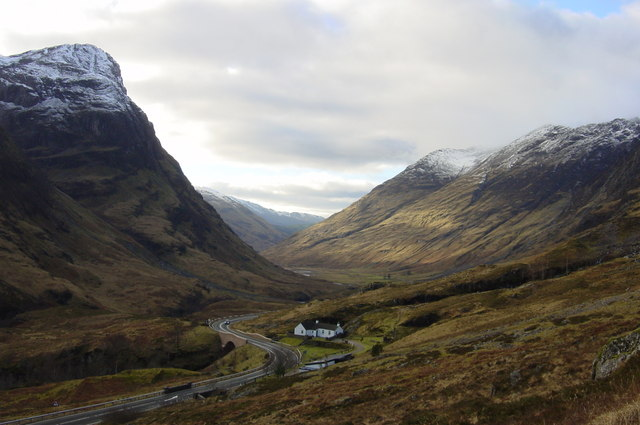
The A82 passing through Glen Coe

The A82 enters bleak moorland at the western fringes of Rannoch Moor, to the north of Tyndrum. The road climbs across the moor and reaches a peak height of 348 metres (1,142 ft) near Beinn Chaorach, the highest overall point on the A82. It meets the old Military Road near the Kingshouse Hotel next to the River Etive, and the road turns westward past Buachaille Etive Mòr down Glen Coe towards Glencoe village. This section of the A82 has been said to contain some of the most spectacular scenery in Scotland. The Guardian's Simon Warren described it as "the most beautiful and spectacular location in the whole of Britain", though recent concern has been raised over the proliferation of tourist traffic. Coaches and HGVs in particular have caused significant problems with congestion. The road descends the Pass of Glen Coe and crosses the scenic waterfalls at the Meeting of the Three Waters. This section was the location for several outdoor shots in Monty Python and the Holy Grail, including the "Gorge of Eternal Peril" scene. Near the waterfalls is a footpath up to Coire Gabhall, the "lost valley" of Glencoe, where the Clan Donald hid stolen cattle.

The modern A82 splits from Telford's route just before the Clachaig Inn, a popular location for tourists due to its proximity to the site of the Massacre of Glencoe, as noted by a sign in the reception that reads, "No hawkers or Campbells". The A82 runs to the west of the River Coe and passes the modern visitors' centre before Glencoe village itself.

=== Glencoe – Fort William ===
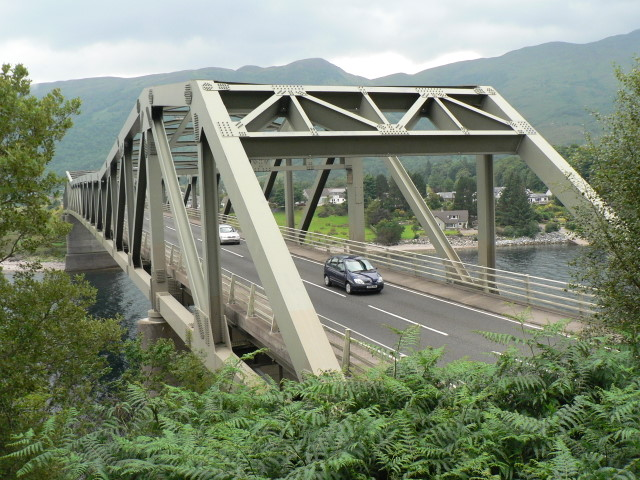
The Ballachulish Bridge, where the A82 crosses the mouth of Loch Leven

The A82 continues along the south shore of Loch Leven beyond Glencoe and bypasses Ballachulish to cross the mouth of the loch via the Ballachulish Bridge. This bridge had been proposed since the mid-1960s, and construction began in late 1972 at an estimated cost of £2m (£16 million as of 2025). An arch bridge had been the suggested design, but an asymmetrical N-truss bridge was built instead. A bearing failure on one of the supports caused delays while the rest of the structure was examined to confirm its safety, and it eventually opened in December 1975. It contains individual spans of 29 metres (95 ft), 180 metres (600 ft) and 82 metres (269 ft) from south to north.

At a roundabout, prior to the rise towards the bridge, the A828 continues south around the coast towards Connel and Oban. Just behind and to the left of the A82, as it commences to cross the bridge, is a monument to the Appin Murder that reads, "Erected in 1911 to the memory of James Stewart of Acharn, or James of the Glen, executed on this spot Nov. 8, 1752, for a crime of which he was not guilty."

After passing through North Ballachulish and Onich the A82 turns to run northward along the Great Glen, which it continues to do for the remainder of the route up to Inverness. It passes the A861 to the Corran Ferry over to Ardnamurchan in the west. The road here, as it was previously along Loch Lomond, is tightly situated between Loch Linnhe and the mountains up to Fort William, which is located about 7 miles (11 km) from the Corran narrows. Various hotels and bed and breakfasts are situated along the road approaching Fort William, indicating the area's esteem of tourism.

The route of the old military road (from King's House/Altnafeadh on Rannoch Moor via Kinlochleven) rejoins the route of the modern A82, at the West End roundabout, just before the High Street in the town centre. The road follows a brief dual carriageway bypass along the shoreline of the loch before passing the modern station. A branch road runs east through Glen Nevis to Ben Nevis, while the A82 turns to cross the River Nevis. To the north of town the A830 "Road to the Isles" runs west to Glenfinnan and Mallaig.

=== Fort William – Inverness ===
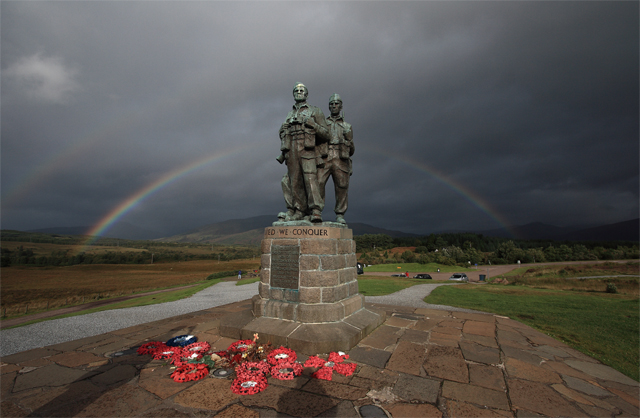
The Commando Memorial at Spean Bridge, with the A82 in the background

North of Fort Willam, the A82 runs alongside the West Highland Railway through Leanachan Forest towards Spean Bridge. It crosses the River Spean at a bridge constructed by Telford in 1819, but the village is named for the earlier "High Bridge"' constructed in 1735–36 by George Wade about 0.5 miles (0.80 km) to the west. There is a junction with the A86, which runs eastwards towards Newtonmore and the Cairngorms. The Commando Memorial, a 5.2-metre (17 ft) high structure dedicated to the original Commandos in World War II, who used the local area as a training ground, is located just north of the village at a junction with the B8004 to Gairlochy. This memorial provides one of the best viewpoints of the Highlands that is close to the A82.

The A82 then follows the eastern shore of Loch Lochy up to Laggan. The village has no clearly defined centre but broadly follows the course of the A82 over 1.2 miles (2 km), from the Laggan Locks on the Caledonian Canal to the swing bridge that separates the canal from Loch Oich. This bridge is close to the "Well of the Seven Heads" monument, which allegedly contains the heads of seven men involved in the murder of Alexander MacDonald, Chief of Keppoch, and his brother, on 25 September 1663.

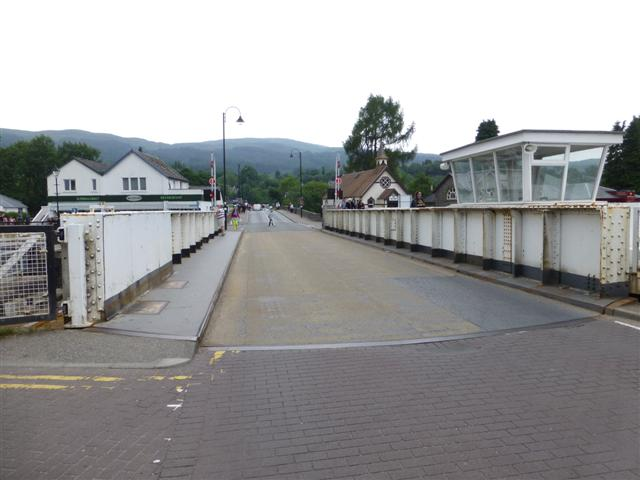
The swing bridge over the Caledonian Canal at Fort Augustus, on the southern edge of Loch Ness

The A82 runs towards the centre of Loch Oich, passes Invergarry Castle, and crosses the River Garry. Just after the bridge, the A87 heads west towards Skye, while the A82 continues along the western shore of the loch up to the Bridge of Oich at its northern end. This bridge was constructed in 1932, bypassing the 1850s Bridge of Oich, a Taper Suspension Bridge built by James Dredge. The A82 continues along the general line of Wade's Military Road up to Fort Augustus, crossing the canal at a swing bridge next to the locks in the village.

The final 36 miles (58 km) from Fort Augustus to Inverness is mostly on the alignment of Telford's Road, running along the western shore of Loch Ness. This is on the opposite side of the loch to Wade's Military Road, because Telford wanted to connect the various communities along the western shore. Construction of the road started in 1805 but was delayed in 1807, when the building contractors abandoned the work with seven bridges yet to be completed. It was mostly complete by 1809 at an estimated cost of £5,800 (£405,000 as of 2025).

Because the A82 is a main through route, tourists are suggested to use the older Military Road instead, so as to avoid the coach and HGV traffic. Cyclists and walkers can use the Great Glen Way between Fort Wiilam and Inverness. This is part of National Cycle Route 78 (The Caledonia Way) from Campbeltown to Inverness.

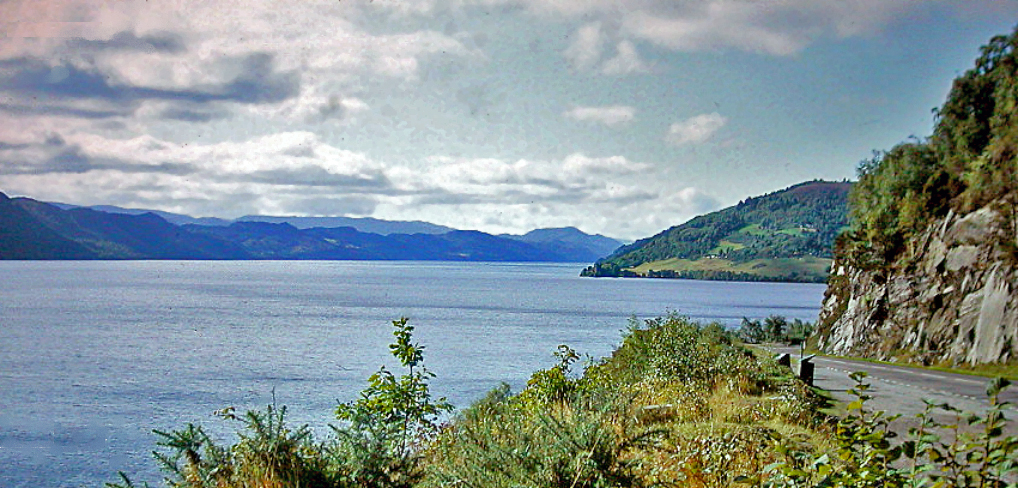
The A82 near Urquhart Castle, with Loch Ness in the background

There is a short diversion from the loch at Invermoriston, where the A82 crosses the River Moriston and the A887 provides another route back to the A87 and Skye. Telford's original stone bridge over the river, constructed in 1813, was replaced by a more modern structure as part of an overall improvement to the A82 undertaken in the 1930s. Between Invermoriston and Drumnadrochit, there is a roadside memorial to John Cobb, who was killed on the loch attempting to beat the water speed record. As the A82 approaches Drumnadrochit, it passes Urquhart Castle before turning inland, away from the loch shore, to approach the village.

The A82 continues at the north end of the loch, along the western edge of the River Ness, which runs parallel alongside the canal towards Inverness city centre. Immediately after entering the urban area, the road crosses the canal at the Tomnahurich Swing Bridge. Now inside Inverness, the road passes Queen's Park stadium and heads towards the city centre. It crosses the Ness at the Friar's Bridge, bypassing the city centre to pass through the docklands and associated industrial estates as an urban dual carriageway. The road ends at a roundabout with the A9 just south of Kessock Bridge.

== History ==
The original route of the A82 as classified in 1923 was described as "Glasgow – Clydebank – Dumbarton – Alexandria – Crianlarich – Ballachulish – Fort William – Fort Augustus – Inverness" and closely follows the route as designed by Telford. With only a few exceptions, the basic route has remained unchanged. The renovations of the early 20th century were part of a wider road building programme (an economic stimulus) after the Great Depression.

=== Glasgow ===
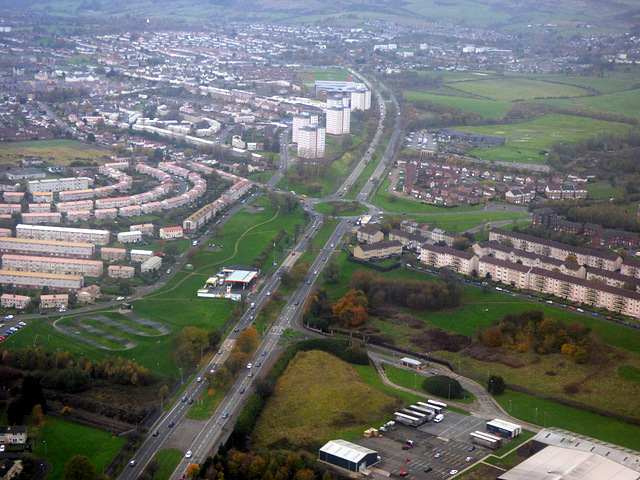
Aerial view of the post-1930s A82 Great Western Road as a municipal boundary: Drumry (West Dunbartonshire) lies to the south / left of image, Drumchapel (Glasgow City) to the north / right

The original starting point of the A82 in Glasgow was at Trongate. It proceeded to run westwards along Argyle Street and Dumbarton Road to Dumbarton via Clydebank. On 16 May 1934, the road was rerouted to run along Buchanan Street, New City Road and Great Western Road, whose westward extension from Anniesland Cross had been recently completed. The route between Glasgow and Dumbarton (bypassing Clydebank via Duntocher), has since broadly remained the same, aside from the declassification of the route to the south of the M8 when that motorway was constructed.

=== Rannoch Moor ===
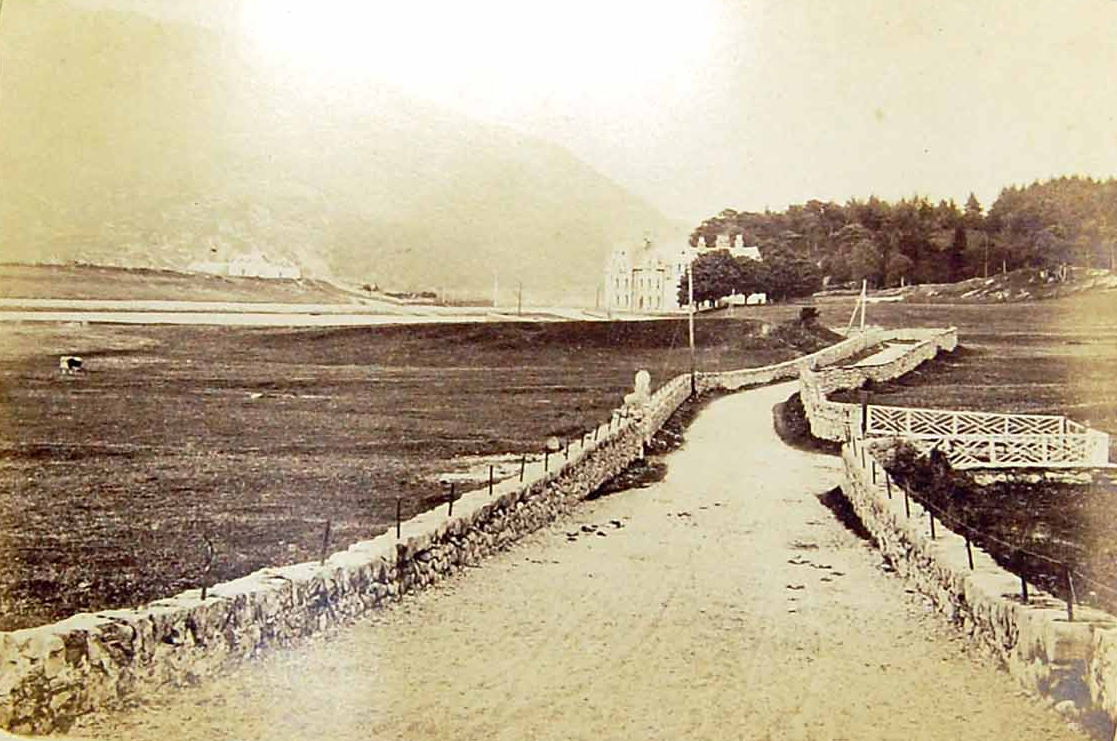
The ferry at Ballachulish (pictured around 1870) that the bridge replaced – part of the original line of the A82

The A82 between Crianlarich and Glencoe over Rannoch Moor has an extensive history. A route through the moor was followed by Major William Caulfeild, and a later route was constructed by Telford. The current alignment was constructed because Telford's road had continual problems with the loch flooding. Telford himself had proposed a completely alternative route, running to Spean Bridge via Loch Treig and Glen Spean. His plans were never implemented, though that route eventually formed part of the West Highland Railway.

The current alignment began construction in 1927, and included a general widening of the carriageway from Tyndrum to Glencoe to 18 feet (5.5 m). Work was delayed following a disagreement with the Scottish Ministry of Transport and local councils over funding. It was eventually completed in 1933 and cost £500,000 (£27,158,000 in 2025).

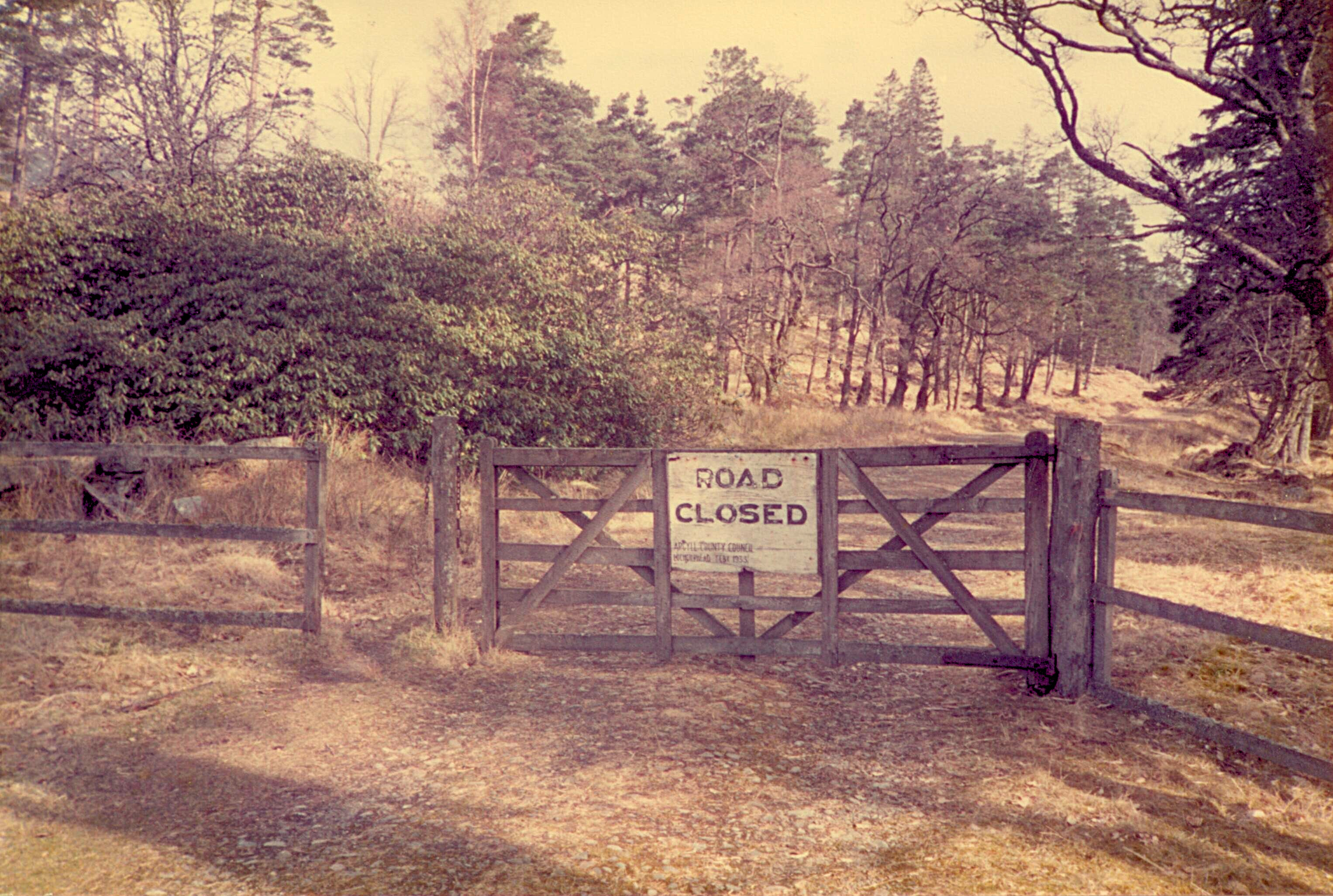
Gate across southern end of Telford's Black Mount road near Victoria Bridge in 1980

The 1930s road follows Telford's road as far as Bridge of Orchy, then runs to the east of Loch Tulla, while the old road runs to the other side. The project was criticised over spoiling the natural beauty of Glen Coe, but was defended by the Ministry of Transport who thought it would provide better transport links to Argyllshire and Inverness-shire.

=== Kinlochleven ===
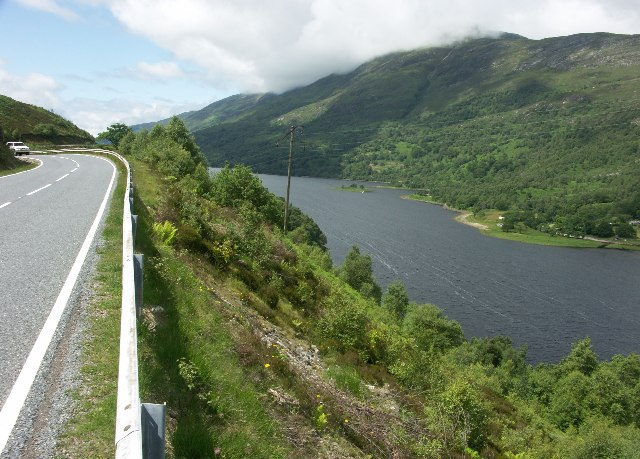
The A82 ran along the extent of Loch Leven from the 1930s to the 1970s. The road here is now the B863.

The original route of the A82 crossed Loch Leven at the Ballachulish Ferry, in a similar location to today's bridge, but there was then no through route around the loch. However, the development of the aluminium works at Kinlochleven and the construction of the Blackwater Dam in 1907 resulted in the construction of a new road around the full extent of the loch, from Glencoe to North Ballachulish, by the 1930s. On 16 May 1934, the Ministry of Transport announced they would divert the A82 along this road, principally because it was an all-day route while the ferry at that time closed daily between 8 p.m. and 8 a.m. and cost up to five shillings to use. It continued to follow the route via Kinlochleven until the opening of the Ballachulish Bridge. The Kinlochleven road is now the B863, but still remains an important local road since the town reinvented itself as a tourist destination following the close of the smelter works in 2000. The Ballachulish bridge saves a 16-mile (26 km) round trip.

=== Inverness ===
The A82 originally ended on the A9 to the west of the Ness Bridge near Inverness city centre. The current diversion over the Friars Bridge towards the modern A9 opened in 1986, in co-ordination with the redevelopment and extension of Inverness docks in the early 1980s and the rerouting of the A9 onto the Kessock Bridge.

== Economic importance ==
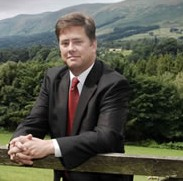
Former Scottish Transport Minister Keith Brown has described the A82 as a "vital economic and social lifeline"

The Scottish Government have said that the A82 is "a vital artery for communities in the western Highlands and links Fort William, the Highlands and the Western Isles with Glasgow and the Central Belt." The Highlands and Islands Transport Partnership (HITRANS) believe the economic benefits of the A82 extend far beyond its basic route, as it connects with several other trunk roads to the Western Highlands and related islands, including all of the Western Isles and the Isle of Skye. The population of the area served around the A82 corridor is expected to decline from 78,900 in 2001 to 72,300 by 2018, with the vast majority of depopulation to occur in the Western Isles.

HITRANS believe investment in the A82 is therefore vitally important to improve the accessibility of these areas and stop the continuing population decline. They have said that improvements to the A9 in the 1970s stimulated the economy of Inverness: "Without the improved access as a result of the A9 improvement, this would almost certainly not have been possible." The partnership believe that with comparable improvements to the A82, an additional income of £76 million could be generated in the area. Former Scottish First Minister Alex Salmond stated whilst in office that the government is "committed to improving the A82", and he allocated £500,000 in June 2011 to study key areas where the route could be improved. Scottish Transport Minister Keith Brown called the A82 a "vital economic and social lifeline".

== Maintenance and improvements ==
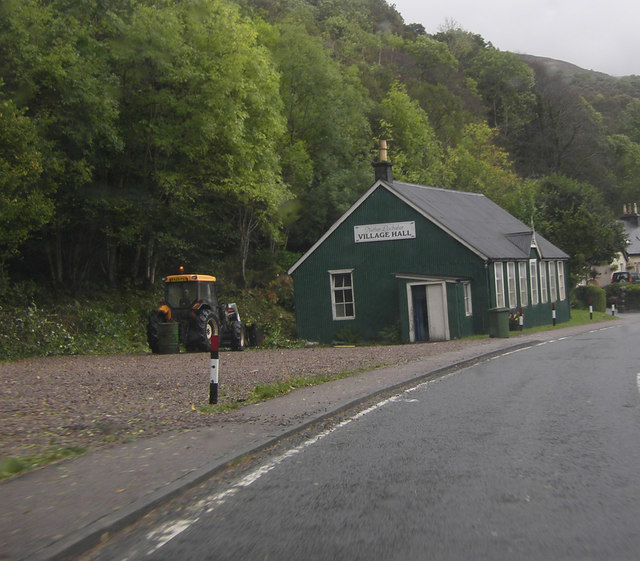
The A82 at Onich has been closed overnight for resurfacing on several occasions, resulting in strong protest from the local community.

The A82, along with the A9, has been frequently regarded as one of the most dangerous roads in Scotland. HITRANS have said that "of the 147 miles (237 km) between Balloch and Inverness, only 42 miles (68 km) can be considered to be of a functional standard." A campaign group, the A82 Partnership, has been set up to encourage the Scottish Government to continue to make improvements to the route. In 2002, the A82 between Tarbet and Tyndrum was listed as the third most dangerous Scottish road in an AA study. The Scottish executive debunked the report as "misleading". A further study listed in the 2012 Collins Big Road Atlas did not list the A82 as one of the most at risk to safety. In 2017, Member of the Scottish Parliament David Stewart criticised the A82's safety record in Inverness after a man was killed after being hit by a car on the road.

The A82 around Loch Lomond has become increasingly congested as the loch has become more popular with tourists for boating, particularly since restrictions were put in place in the Lake District, coincident with improvements to routes leading to the Loch from the south. On regular occasions, the road is completely congested from Luss to the Balloch roundabout. The section from Tarbet to Crianlarich, north of the section improved in the 1980s and 90s, was frequently closed overnight during September 2012, because the carriageway had become worn out and needed urgent repair, including failed surfacing and potholes. Because of the narrow width of the road, it was not possible to simply close the road in one direction at a time with temporary traffic signals, as is the general procedure elsewhere on Britain's road network. Transport Scotland justified these works by saying that only 5% of traffic used the road between 10 pm and 6 am, when the works were planned. The official diversion route from Tarbet to Crianlarich is via the A83, A819 and A85, a detour of approximately 30 miles (48 km).

Because most of the A82 is single carriageway, and the local geography means a detour can be a significant distance, there is a history of strong protest about closing the road. In August 2011, John Grieve, owner of Lochleven Shellfish Company, attempted to challenge Transport Scotland's plans to close the A82 overnight five days a week, for a period of up to three weeks, around the village of Onich, between Glencoe and Fort William. The Scottish Herald reported that, if the road closed, a journey from Oban to Fort William, normally 44 miles (71 km), would require diverting via Loch Tay and Ballinluig, a journey of 166 miles (267 km). In April 2013, Transport Scotland announced further plans to close the A82 at Onich for resurfacing, but they postponed the work due to an adverse reaction from local business owners. In 2015, a section of the A82 between Invermoriston and Drumnadrochit closed following a rockfall, requiring an official detour of 120 miles (190 km).

Along with several other roads in the Highlands, the A82 between Tyndrum and Glencoe has been installed with permanent gates that are closed in the event of severe weather. These gates are now fitted with fibre-optic illuminated signs. The road has been identified as one of several trunk roads in the Highlands that suffers from problems with deer-vehicle collisions. In 1996, Transport Scotland set up a number of vehicle activated warning signs alerting drivers attention to nearby deer. Four of these signs are on the A82 between Tyndrum and Glencoe.

== Junctions and landmarks ==
The A82 has a wide variety of junctions along its length, ranging from high-quality grade-separated interchanges near Glasgow, to simple T-junctions in the Scottish Highlands.

Distance	Name	Destination
0 miles (0 km)		Edinburgh, Kilmarnock, Greenock, Glasgow Airport M8; Carlisle (M74); Stirling (M80)
22 miles (35 km)		Erskine Bridge, Paisley A898
North Clyde Line
Loch Lomond
33 miles (53 km)	Tarbet	Campbeltown A83
50 miles (80 km)	Crianlarich	Perth, Stirling A85
West Highland Line (Oban branch)
54.7 miles (88.0 km)	Tyndrum	Oban A85
Glen Coe
87.6 miles (141.0 km)		Oban A828
88 miles (142 km)	Ballachulish Bridge	
Loch Linnhe
West Highland Line (Fort William branch)
102 miles (164 km)	Fort William	Mallaig A830
110 miles (180 km)	Spean Bridge	Newtonmore A86
Loch Lochy
Loch Oich
125 miles (201 km)	Invergarry	Kyle of Lochalsh, Skye A87
Loch Ness
138 miles (222 km)		Kyle of Lochalsh, Skye A887
Far North Line
167 miles (269 km)		Perth, Thurso A9; Aberdeen A96; Ullapool (A835)

== See also ==
- Old military roads of Scotland
