= Maria M. Grant =

- Born: September 2, 1841; Invermoriston
- Died: March 11, 1928; Chelsea
- Occupation: Writer
- Father: Patrick Grant
- Relatives: Helen Henrietta Grant

Maria Margaret Grant (September 2, 1841 – March 11, 1928) was a Scottish novelist best known for her novel Lescar, the Universalist (1874).

Maria Margaret Grant was born on September 2, 1841 in Invermoriston, the daughter of Patrick Grant WS, solicitor and Sheriff Clerk of Inverness-shire, and Emilie Ballie. After her father's death in 1870, she, her mother, and her sister relocated to Reigate, where she spent the rest of her life. Her sister Helen Henrietta married William Nathaniel Massey, MP for Salford, and writer Sidney Bouverie Pusey.

Several of her novels feature exotic female protagonists: Artiste (1871), The Sun-Maid (1876), and Prince Hugo (1880). Artiste follows a half-Indian orphan who becomes a Parisian stage actress. The Sun-Maid is Zophée Variazinka, a Russian woman of Roma descent who beguiles a young Englishman, Sir Gilbert Erle. US President James Garfield wrote in his diary that his wife read The Sun-Maid and was "delighted with it." Her most successful novel, Lescar, the Universalist (1874), is set during the Paris Commune and the Franco-Prussian War. Jeanie Lairn's Wee Laddie (1881) features a Scottish boy who grows up to become a hero of the Crimean War and is awarded the Victoria Cross.

Maria Margaret Grant died on 11 March 1928 in Chelsea.

== Bibiography ==
- Artiste. 3 vol. London: Hurst and Blackett, 1871.
- Bright Morning. 3 vol. London: Chapman and Hall, 1873.
- Lescar, the Universalist. 3 vol. London: Chapman and Hall, 1874.
- The Sun-Maid: A Romance. 3 vol. London: Bentley, 1876.
- My Heart's in the Highlands. 3 vol. London: Bentley, 1878.
- Prince Hugo: A Bright Episode. 3 vol. London: Chapman and Hall, 1880.
- One May Day: A Sketch in Summer Time. 3 vol. London: Chapman and Hall, 1881.
- Jeanie Lairn's Wee Laddie: A Simple Story of the Old Town. 1 vol. London: Hatchards, 1881.
- So True A Love: A Novel. G. W. Carleton & Co., 1884.
- Cara Roma. 2 vol. London: Chapman and Hall, 1885.
