= River Ness =

River in Scotland

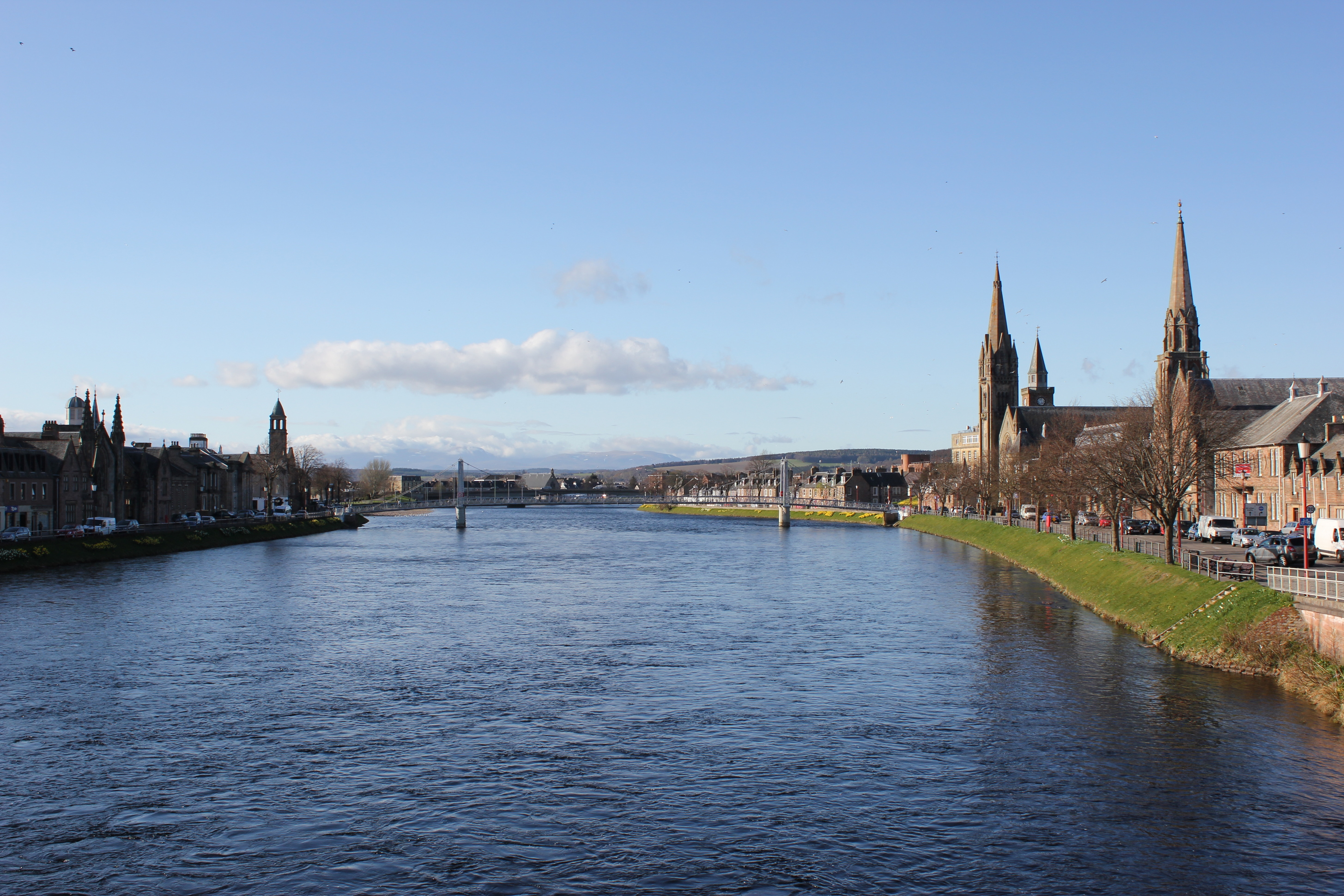
- The river at Inverness

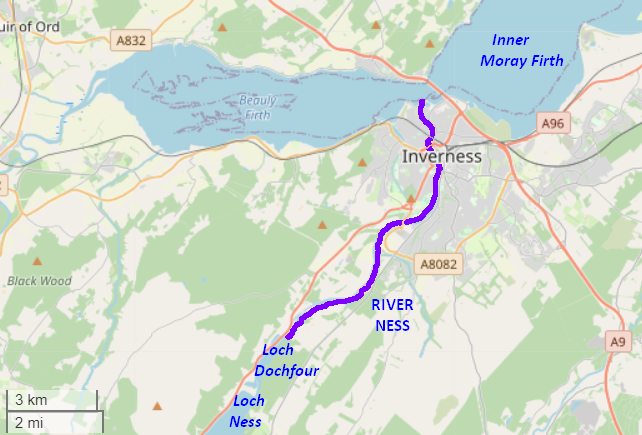
- River Ness location

Physical characteristics
- Source
  - location: Loch Dochfour
  - coordinates: 57°25′30″N 4°18′45″W
- Mouth
  - location: Moray Firth
  - coordinates: 57°29′43″N 4°14′10″W
- Length: 6.2 mi (10.0 km)
- Basin size: 1,850 km^{2} (710 sq mi)
- Discharge
  - average: 91 m^{3}/s (3,200 cu ft/s)

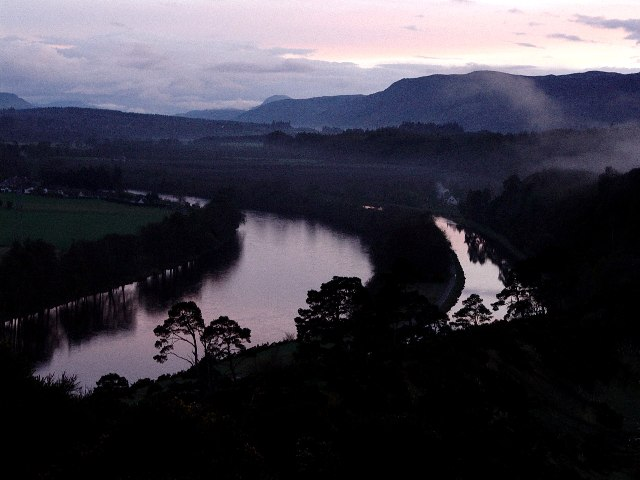
The River Ness (left) and the Caledonian Canal (right)

The River Ness (Scottish Gaelic: Abhainn Nis) is a short river in the Great Glen of Scotland. It begins at Loch Dochfour, at the northern end of Loch Ness, and flows northeast towards the city of Inverness, where it empties into the Moray Firth. It runs parallel to the Caledonian Canal for the first half of its course, which is six miles (10 km) long in total.

At Inverness, the river contains a group of wooded islets known as the Ness Islands, some of which are linked to the shore by footbridges.

== Bridges ==
=== Ness Viaduct ===
The last bridge before the Beauly Firth is the Ness Viaduct, a railway bridge carrying the Far North Line that was initially built in 1862 by Joseph Mitchell, before being washed away by floodwaters in 1989, which had been exacerbated due to the Beauly Firth being at low tide, leaving the Harbour waterline two meters below that of the river, resulting in a waterfall effect. The bridge was nearly entirely washed away with the remainder being demolished in 1990 when the new bridge was constructed. All that remains of the original bridge are four spans that cross a car park in the former harbour.

=== Black Bridge ===
The Black Bridge, or Waterloo Bridge, was built parallel to the railway bridge in 1889, carrying both foot and vehicle traffic, it replaced a wooden bridge at the same site that had been built in 1808.

=== Friars Bridge ===
The Friars Bridge was opened on 23 December 1986 as an extension of the A82 in order to bypass the road around the city center and connect the road to the A9 at the Longman Roundabout. It is the only dual carriageway bridge that crosses the River Ness

=== Greig Street Bridge ===
The Greig Street Bridge is a warren trussed suspension footbridge built in 1890, which crosses the river at the junction of Greig Street and Huntly Street and ends at the junction of Bank Street and Church Lane. Locally it is known as one of the two "Bouncy Bridges", as the bridge deck produces a sine wave effect should one time their steps correctly with other pedestrians.

=== Ness Bridge ===
The Ness Bridge has been the primary crossing of the Ness since at least the 15th Century. The first known bridge was initially built with timber, before being rebuilt in 1685, the second known replacement incorporated a small prison cell, and remained standing for 164 years before succumbing to a flood in January 1849. The third known replacement was a suspension bridge built in 1850 by J M Rendal and incorporated a castle like turret at the Bridge Street end, unfortunately this bridge was demolished in 1960 due to increasing motor traffic, and was briefly replaced by a temporary bridge until the modern day bridge was completed on 7 August 1961.

=== Infirmary Bridge ===
Built to the same design as the Greig Street Bridge, the Infirmary Bridge connects Ness Walk to Great Glen Way, and is the second of the "Bouncy Bridges". Unfortunately this bridge hasn't fared as well as is sister bridge downstream and is prone to closures for repairs.

=== Ness Islands bridges ===
The original bridges to the Ness Islands were built in 1828, but these were washed away in 1849 in the same flood that washed away the Ness Bridge, and were replaced in 1853 by a pair of half suspension, half cantilever bridges that stood in place until being replaced in 1988. One of these bridges survives today as part of the Ness Islands Railway at Whin Park. While these bridges are of similar design to the Greig Street and Infirmary Bridges, they do not have the same bounce effect.

=== Holm Mills Bridge ===
The most southern, and newest bridge across the river is the Holm Mills bridge that was built in 2017 to carry the A8082 and connect the A82 at Torvean to the A9 at Drakies via the Southern Distributor Road, taking traffic away from the city center.

== Legends ==
In Scottish folklore, the river is inhabited by kelpies (water spirits who shapeshift) who take the form of horses or people and lure travellers into the water.

The first claimed sighting of the Loch Ness Monster was in the River Ness in AD 565, when Saint Columba is said to have banished a "water monster" back into the river after it tried to attack one of his disciples who was swimming across the river.

According to Adomnán, when Columba visited King Bridei I of Pictland at his house on the River Ness, he met a wizard named Broichan who had an Irish slave-girl that he refused to release even though Columba pleaded with him. Columba went out of Bridei's house and picked up a white pebble from the river. He said that the pebble would be used to heal many sick people in Pictland, and that Broichan was suffering for his sins at that very moment. After he had finished speaking, two messengers came to tell them that Broichan had a seizure and they wanted Columba to help them. Columba gave them the stone and said to dip it in water to give to Broichan, if he agreed to release the slave-girl. He agreed to do so, and the stone was put in water and it floated on it; the wizard drank from the water and was healed. This stone was kept by King Bridei in the royal treasury for the rest of his life, and anyone who came there for healing would be given water with the stone floating in it, and they would be healed.

== See also ==
- Rivers of Scotland
