= Loch Leven (Highlands) =

Sea loch in Highland, Scotland

Coordinates: 56°41′26″N 5°7′6″W

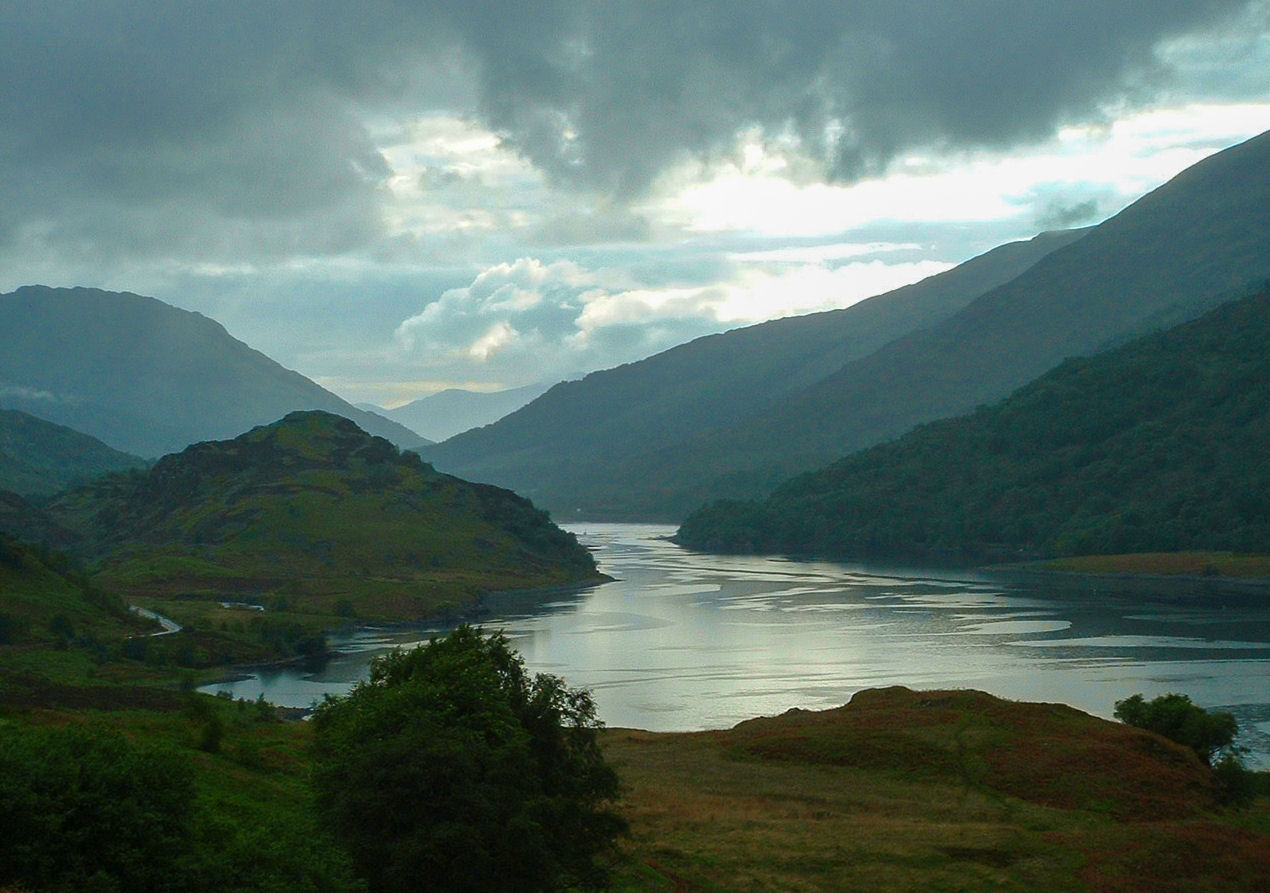
South side of Loch Leven, looking west

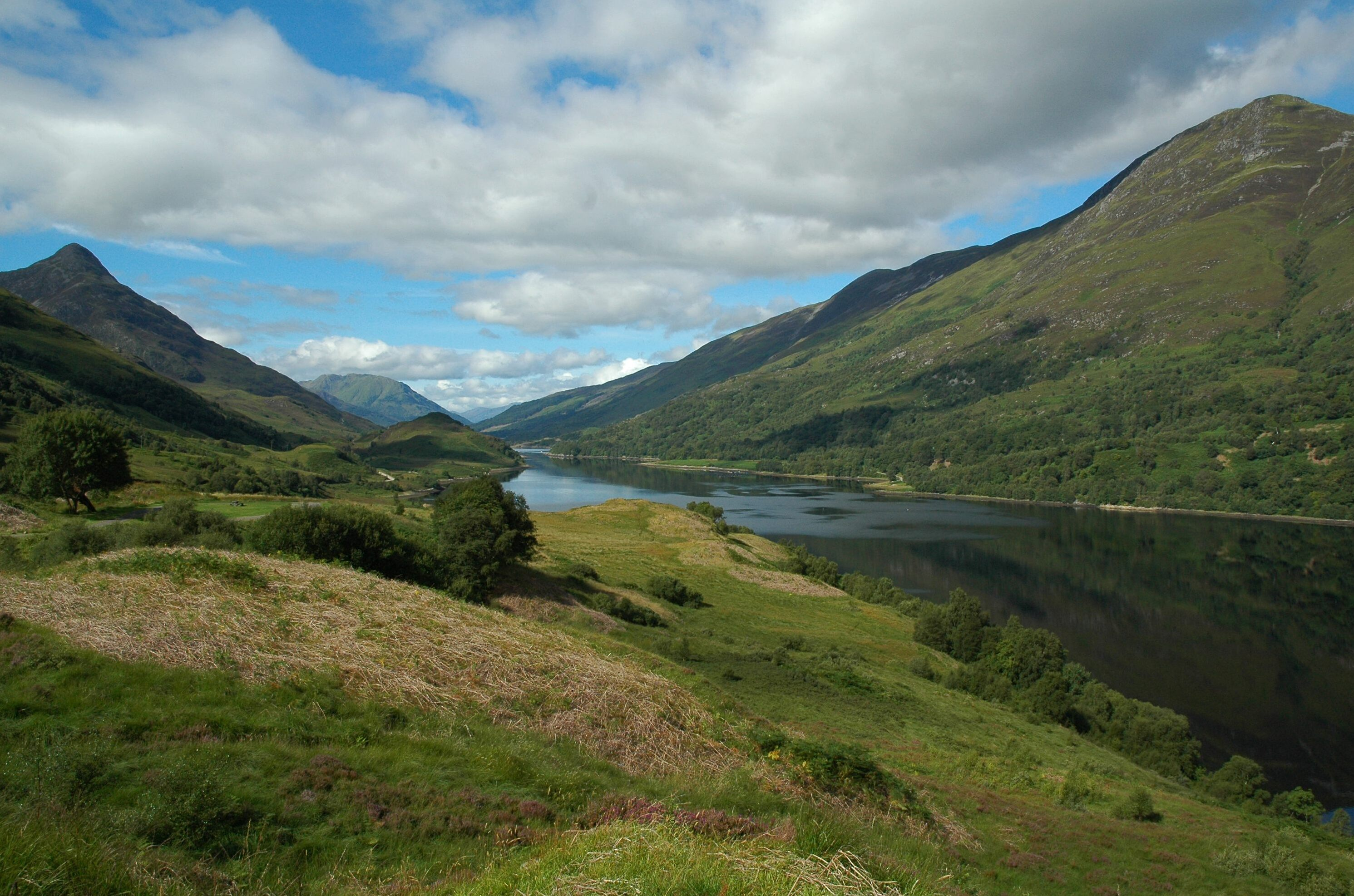
Loch Leven on a summer day

Loch Leven (Scottish Gaelic: Loch Lìobhann) is a sea loch located on the west coast of Scotland. It is spelled Loch Lyon in Timothy Pont's map of the area and is pronounced Li' un. However, the local Gaelic pronunciation is Lee' oon

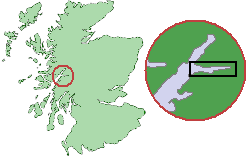
Map of Loch Leven

Loch Leven extends 8 3/4 miles (14.1 km), varying in width between 220 yards (200 m) and just over 1 mile (1.6 km). It opens onto Camus a' Chois at North Ballachulish, part of Loch Linnhe at its western end. There are nine small islands, some rocky and covered with heather and some just smooth green grass, near the western end of the loch.

The village of Glencoe (Scottish Gaelic: A' Chàrnaich) lies on its southern shore. The burial place of the MacDonald clan of Glencoe lies on an island - Eilean Munde, St.Munda's or St Munn's or Saint Fintan Munnu's Island, opposite the village. The island burial place was also shared by the Camerons of Callart, which is on the north shore of the loch, the Stewarts of Ballachulish and Appin and other local families.

The village of Kinlochleven at the head of the loch was established when the aluminium smelter was built there during the first decade of the twentieth century. It was originally the hamlets of Kinlochmore (Inverness-shire) and Kinlochbeg (Argyll) on either side of the River Leven. A road connecting the village to Glencoe and the south was not constructed until 1922: until this date the village could only be reached from the south by boat or on foot. The road on the north of the loch continues on to Fort William (Scottish Gaelic: An Gearasdan Inbhir Lochaidh), and was built in 1927.

For many years the Ballachulish Ferry plied the route across the mouth of the loch, providing a key link on the A82 between Glasgow and Fort William. In 1975 the Ballachulish Bridge replaced the ferry. Under the bridge lie the narrows of Caolas Mhic Phàdraig. The settlements on either side of this point are North and South Ballachulish - Baile a' Chaolais (the settlement on the narrows). There is a fast tidal stream through the narrows, running up to seven knots at springs; it is wise, therefore, to time and match any passage through the narrows with the tides. Further up the loch there are several other narrows - principally Caolas na Con - with significant, but diminishing tidal streams. The Caolas na Con represented a considerable barrier to shipping, restricting the size of vessels that could reach Kinlochleven, however in 1907 the channel was dredged and the silt-bearing Allt Gleann a' Chaolais diverted to allow ships bringing bauxite alumina to reach the smelter at Kinlochleven.
