= James Dredge Jr. =

English civil engineer and journalist

James Dredge (29 July 1840 – 15 August 1906) was an English civil engineer and journalist of engineering. He is best known for being co-editor of Engineering, illustrating, photographing and surveying many bridges in Britain in the latter part of the 19th century.

== Early years ==
He was born in Bath to an engineer and architect father, James Dredge Sr., a brewer originally, who designed suspension bridges and piers. His father designed the Victoria Bridge in Bath in 1836, and the Birnbeck Pier in Weston-super-Mare in 1845, among over 50 others. His mother was Anne Vine. His elder brother, William, also became an engineer. There was also a sister, Elizabeth. James Dredge junior was educated at Bath Grammar School.

== Career ==
Dredge was employed from 1858 to 1861 as an engineer in the office of Daniel Kinnear Clark. In 1862, he was employed by John Fowler, and worked on the District Railway in London. In January 1866, he ventured into engineering journalism, joining the weekly journal Engineering. In the late 1860s, he mainly illustrated for the journal, writing the occasional article, attending the great Paris Exhibition of 1867, where the journal writers "discovered a fund of new technology on which to report". However, in 1870, on the death of editor Zerah Colburn, he became a co-editor of the journal with William Henry Maw. Maw not only considered Dredge to be a friend, but also his senior in technical matters. As editor of Engineering, Dredge was a surveyor, documenting numerous bridges and photographing them in the 1890s; a notable contribution was his Thames Bridges, from the Tower to the Source (1897). In 1901, he founded a monthly supplement to Engineering, a journal named Traction and Transmission, but it only lasted for three years.

Dredge had an interest in the various international exhibitions held both in the UK and abroad. As early as 1851, he served on the Royal Exhibition Commission. He authored several works on them, notably on the Vienna Universal Exhibition (1873) with Maw and Alexander Kennedy, as well as the Paris International Exhibition (1878). He served as British commissioner at exhibitions at Chicago (1893), Antwerp (1894), Brussels (1897), and Milan (1906). He was created a Companion of the Order of St Michael and St George for his services as Commissioner-General for Great Britain at the 1897 Brussels Exhibition. Dredge was a member of the Institution of Mechanical Engineers from 1874, the Institution of Civil Engineers from 4 February 1896, and several other engineering societies, and was appointed an honorary member of the American Society of Mechanical Engineers in 1886. Dredge was also a member of the council of the Society of Arts from 1890 until 1893. Dredge was a contributor to the Dictionary of National Biography, providing the extensive article on Henry Bessemer in 1901.

== Personal life ==
Dredge's participation in the management of Engineering ended in May 1903 due to paralysis. He died at Pinner Wood Cottage in Pinner, (then Middlesex, now northwest London) on 15 August 1906, survived by Marie Louise, his only child. His tomb lies in Kensal Green Cemetery in Kensal Green, Royal Borough of Kensington and Chelsea, west London.

== Selected written works ==
- The Paris International Exhibition of 1878 (1878)
- The Pennsylvania Railroad, its organisation, construction, and management (1879)
- Electric illumination (2 volumes, 1882 & 1885)
- Modern French artillery (1892)
- A record of the transportation exhibits at the World's Columbian exposition of 1893 (1894)
- Thames Bridges, from the Tower to the Source (1897)
