= Ballievey Bridge =

Bridge in Northern Ireland

Coordinates: 54°20′30.8″N 6°13′11.4″W

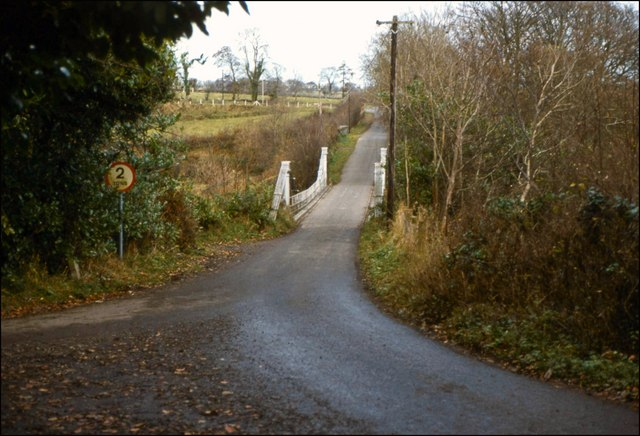
Original Ballievey Bridge, by a design of James Dredge.

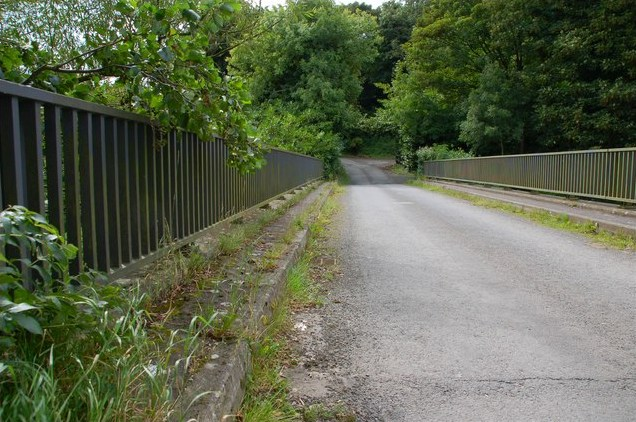
Current Ballievey Bridge.

Ballievey Bridge spans the River Bann at Ballievey, near Banbridge, County Down, Northern Ireland.

The original suspension bridge was from a design by James Dredge, Sr. Destroyed in 1988 under the weight of a lorry, it was the only one within the Dredge's Ulster group which was not a footbridge. A replacement bridge was erected thereafter.
