= Fearnoch =

Village in Argyll and Bute, Scotland

Coordinates: 56°26′19″N 5°18′16″W

- Location within Argyll and Bute
- OS grid reference: NM963322
- Council area: Argyll and Bute
- Lieutenancy area: Argyll and Bute
- Country: Scotland
- Sovereign state: United Kingdom
- Post town: TAYNUILT
- Postcode district: PA35
- Police: Scotland
- Fire: Scottish
- Ambulance: Scottish
- UK Parliament: Argyll, Bute and South Lochaber
- Scottish Parliament: Argyll and Bute

Fearnoch is a small village in Argyll and Bute, Scotland. It is located just off the A85 road, about 2 miles (3 km) west of the village of Taynuilt.

== Forest ==
The village lies at the northern edge of Fearnoch Forest, a woodland managed by Forestry Commission Scotland, which contains trails for walking, cycling, and horseback riding.

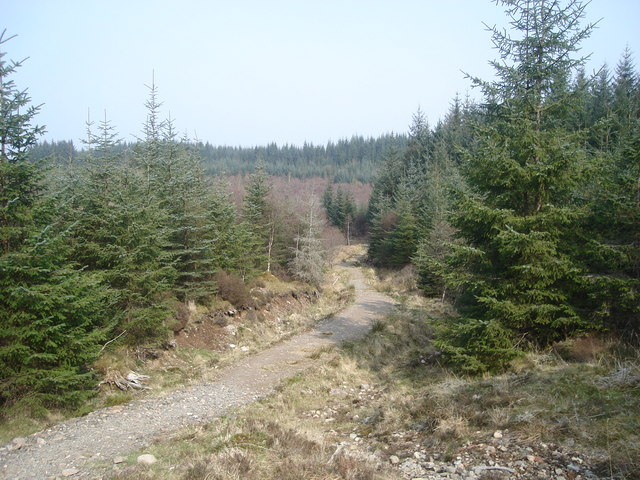
A trail in Fearnoch Forest

== Transport ==
The West Highland Line railway service between Tyndrum and Oban stops at nearby Taynuilt, and buses between Tyndrum and Oban stop at Fearnoch. National Cycle Route 78 passes by the village.
