= Francis Kiernan =

Anatomist and physician

Francis Kiernan FRS (2 October 1800 – 31 December 1874) was an anatomist and physician.

He was born in Ireland, the eldest of four children. His father, Francis Kiernan (died 7 March 1850 at 30 Manchester Square, London), was also a physician and brought the family to England in the early 19th century. Francis junior was educated at the Roman Catholic College at Ware, Hertfordshire, and was trained in medicine at St Bartholomew's Hospital, London.

He set up a private anatomy class in Charterhouse Square, but, in the words of the British Medical Journal, his "great success as a teacher caused much jealousy, and, in 1825, gave rise to the Council of the College of Surgeons passing a resolution refusing to receive certificates from any but recognised teachers." Kiernan's class size dwindled as students departed. Appeals to the Council to rescind its decision, on the grounds of Kiernan's ability and skill as a teacher, were dismissed.

He became a Member of the Royal College of Surgeons of England in 1825. He was elected a Fellow of the Royal Society in 1834 and was awarded its Copley Medal in 1836 for his work on the anatomy of the liver. That same year, he became a founding Member of the Senate of the University of London, where he acted as examiner and lecturer in anatomy and physiology.

In 1843, he was elected a Fellow of the Royal College of Surgeons, and served on its Council from 1850. After a single year as Vice-President (1864–5), he declined re-nomination on the grounds of ill-health, having suffered a paralytic stroke in 1865 from which he never fully recovered.

In 1849, he was elected as a member of the American Philosophical Society.

He died unmarried at his home in Manchester Street, Manchester Square, London on New Year's Eve, 1874, and was buried in the Roman Catholic cemetery at Mortlake, London.
