= Ness Islands =

Coordinates: 57.4632°N 4.2307°W

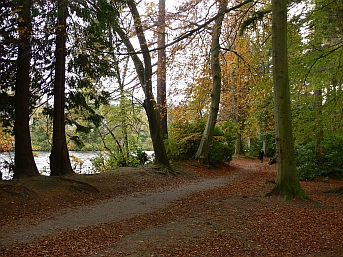
Ness Islands

The Ness Islands (Scottish Gaelic: Na h-Eileanan Nis) are situated on the River Ness, opposite the Bught Park, in the city of Inverness, Scotland. The first bridges to the islands were built in 1828; prior to their construction the only access to the islands was by boat. The original bridges were washed away in the flood of 1849 and were replaced in 1853–1854 by two suspension bridges designed by William Dredge.

The Ness Islands were also the location of a public water supply, established in 1829 by the Inverness Gas and Water Company, in which a waterwheel pumped water from a lade, adjacent to the islands, up to a tank in Old Edinburgh Road, which then supplied houses and standpipes.

The islands are a walking spot on the Great Glen Way and the islands are home to a number of imported species of trees and home to wildlife such as bats and otters and occasionally deer. The area includes play facilities for children, and the Ness Islands miniature railway.
