= Ballachulish Bridge =

Bridge in Highland, Scotland

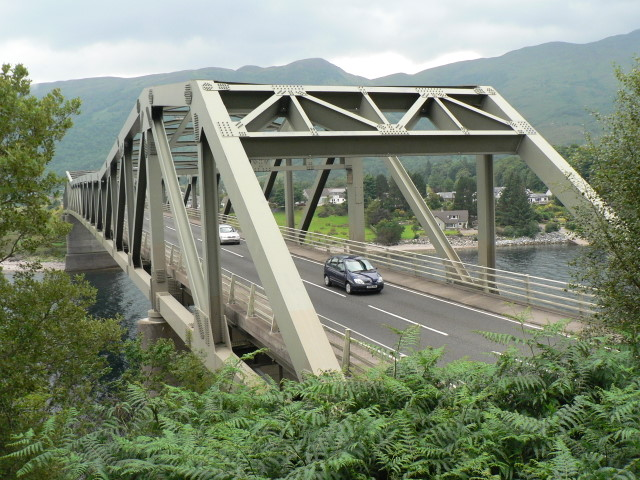
- Coordinates: 56°41′19.87″N 05°10′55.35″W
- Carries: A82
- Crosses: Loch Leven and Loch Linnhe
- Locale: Highland

Characteristics
- Design: Steel truss with fabricated box chords
- Total length: 964 feet (294 m)

History
- Designer: Cleveland Bridge & Engineering Company
- Construction end: 1974
- Opened: December 1975

Location
- Interactive map of Ballachulish Bridge

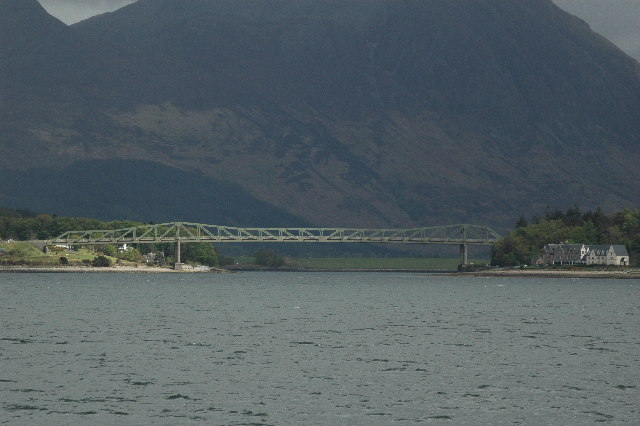
Ballachulish Bridge

The Ballachulish Bridge is a road bridge in the West Highlands of Scotland which carries the A82 road that runs from Glasgow to Inverness.

It crosses the narrows (Caolas Mhic Phadruig - Patrick's Narrows) between Loch Leven and Loch Linnhe, linking the villages of South Ballachulish (Argyll) and North Ballachulish (Inverness-shire).

The bridge was built by the Cleveland Bridge & Engineering Company and opened in 1975, replacing the Ballachulish ferry. It is a two-lane road bridge of through steel truss construction with fabricated box chords. It was butts designed by W.A. Fairhurst and Partners of Newcastle upon Tyne. It is 964 feet (294 m) long, with the deck 54 feet (16 m) above the water.

In July 2003, two Spanish pilots flew under the bridge in light aircraft. No action was taken by the police following discussions with both the Civil Aviation Authority and the procurator fiscal.

== See also ==
- List of bridges in Scotland
