= Invermoriston =

Coordinates: 57.215951°N 4.618564°W

Invermoriston: Scottish Gaelic: Inbhir Mhoireastain
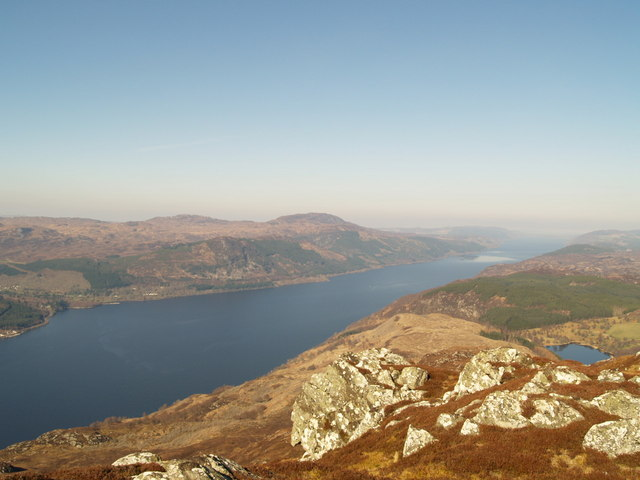
- View of Loch Ness looking North from the summit of Beinn a Bachaidh. The hill in the centre of the photo is Meall-Fuar-mhonaidh (699m). Invermoriston is to the left.

- Location within the Inverness area
- OS grid reference: NH420167
- Council area: Highland
- Lieutenancy area: Craic
- Country: Scotland
- Sovereign state: United Kingdom
- Post town: INVERNESS
- Postcode district: IV63
- Police: Scotland
- Fire: Scottish
- Ambulance: Scottish

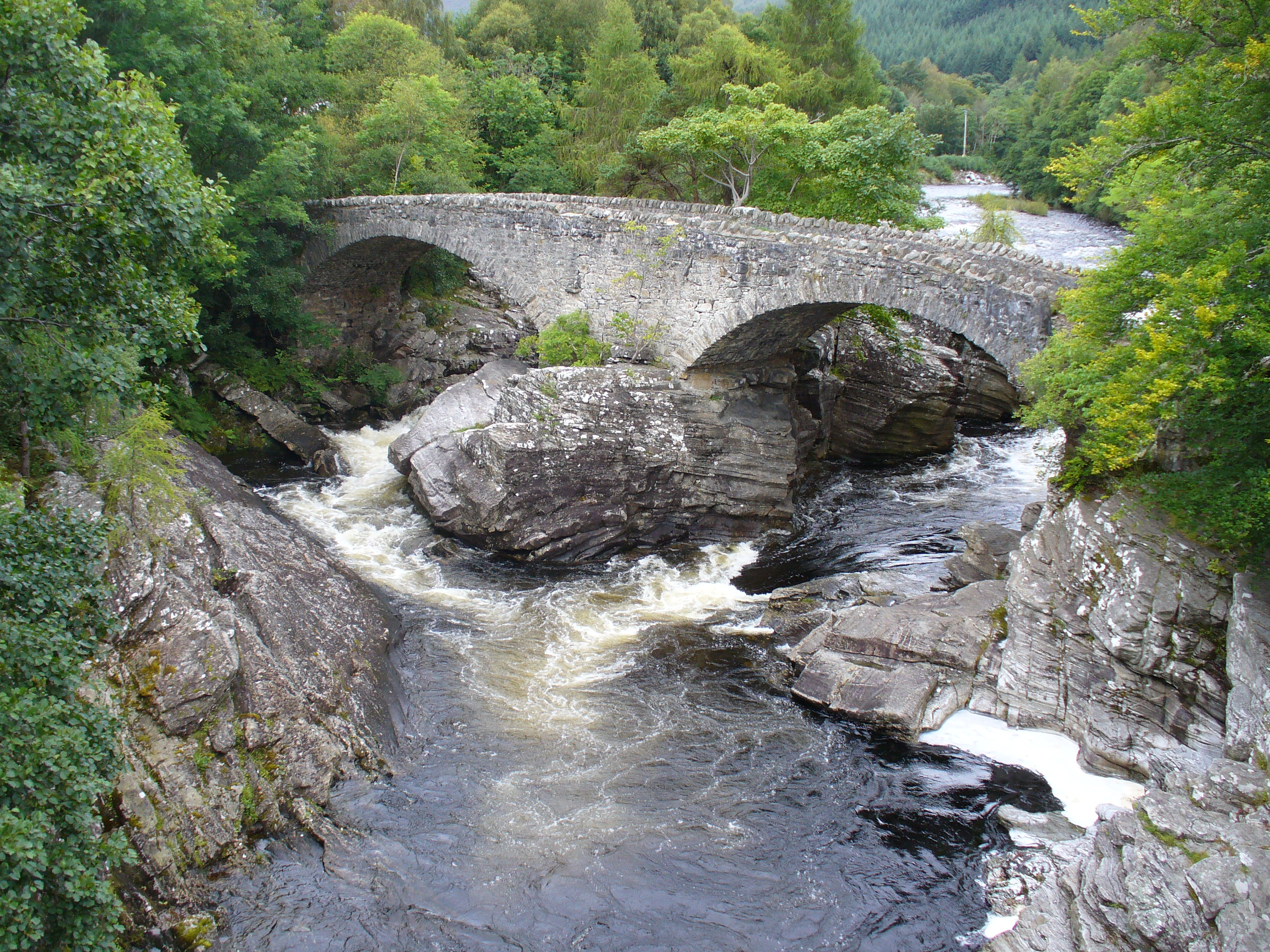
The Telford bridge at Invermoriston.

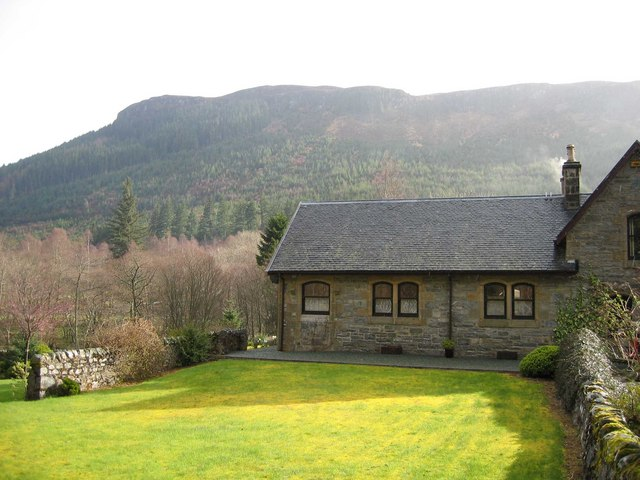
The Old School House

Invermoriston (Inbhir Mhoireastain in Gaelic) (grid reference NH420167) is a small village 11 kilometres (7 miles) north of Fort Augustus, Highland, Scotland. The village is on the A82 road, at a junction with the A887.

The village's most visited attraction is the Thomas Telford bridge, built in 1813, which crosses the spectacular River Moriston falls. This bridge used to form part of the main road between Drumnadrochit and Fort Augustus but was replaced in the 1930s with the new bridge used today. Invermoriston's attractions include a hotel, called Glenmoriston Arms, village shop, clog and craft shop as well as a coffee shop/restaurant. From the top of the hill above the village, Sròn Na Muic (Scottish Gaelic for "The Nose of the Pig"), one can admire the finest views of the Great Glen.
