= James Dredge Sr. =

James Dredge (1794–1863) was an English civil engineer, architect and brewer. He was born in Bath and was a brewer by trade for much of his life. He designed over 50 bridges and piers in his later years, such as the Victoria Bridge in Bath in 1836, and the Birnbeck Pier in Weston-super-Mare in 1845 (although not built due to early damage).

He patented the 'taper principle' on his Birnbeck Pier. This method was based on using wrought iron suspension chains rather than cables, using inclined hangers, increasing the number of bars, starting with one at the centre and increasing by plus one along each bar's placement within the support system. This method not only weighed less weight but also diminished construction duration. This was a more common practice in suspension bridges for which he received notability. Dredge's bridge design was considered "a very significant yet relatively short-lived phase in suspension bridge development". Other bridges attributed to Dredge include the Bridge of Oich along the A82 road in Highland (1854); Ness Islands suspension bridges, since rebuilt in 1975; Victoria Bridge and Lochybridge in Fort William (since replaced); Stowell Park Bridge on Kennet & Avon Canal, northwest of Pewsey, Wiltshire; and the proposal for the Menai Suspension Bridge on Anglesey (1839). Of the several Dredge-patent bridges built in Ulster, almost none are still in existence; the Ballievey Bridge, destroyed in 1988 under the weight of a lorry, was the only one within the Ulster group which was not a footbridge.

In March 1844 James Dredge wrote a short article on the suspension bridge he had built in India the previous Autumn across the river Kubbudduk near Jesson (about 50 miles north of Calcutta). The suspended platform was 261 ft in length with the central span being 175 ft, and the roadway had a width of 11 ft. The main chains were composed of bars 7/8in diameter in links 6 ft 4in long. The number of bars in each link reduced progressively towards the centre of the span so that only a single bar was present in the centre (the 'taper Principle' referred to above). The bars were proof tested in England to ensure they met the Indian Government standard of 10 tons per sq in. The inclined suspension bars that connected the chain to the roadway were 3/4in diameter attached to the roadway at 5 ft 6in spacing. In a footnote to the article he states "I have with the above constructed fourteen bridges upon this plan, all of which practically prove the correctness of my invention."

Another Dredge suspension bridge in India was erected over the entrance to the wet docks at Kidderpoor near Calcutta in c1845. This had a 120 ft central span and a 24 ft wide platform.

== Personal life ==
In the mid-nineteenth century, Dredge lived at 22 Sion Hill Place, Bath, also known as Gothic Cottage 27, which is now a Grade II listed building. Married to Anne Vine, there were at least three children, including a daughter, Elizabeth, and two sons. The elder son, William, was an engineer, as was a younger son, James Dredge Jr. (1840–1906), who was also a notable journalist of Engineering, until paralysis forced him to end his participation in the journal.
