= Letterfearn =

Coordinates: 57.25428°N 5.50877°W

Letterfearn: Scottish Gaelic: Leitir Fheàrna
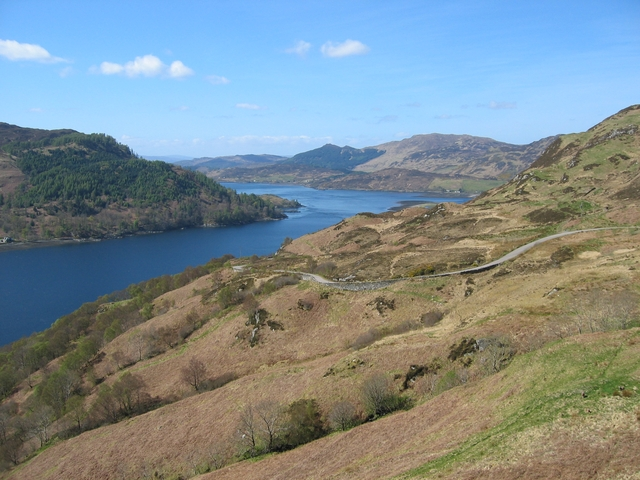
- Carr Brae Looking from close to the viewpoint towards the mouth of Loch Duich. Letterfearn is to the left and on the other side of the bay.

- Location within the Ross and Cromarty area
- OS grid reference: NG884236
- Council area: Highland
- Country: Scotland
- Sovereign state: United Kingdom
- Postcode district: IV40 8
- Police: Scotland
- Fire: Scottish
- Ambulance: Scottish

Letterfearn (Scottish Gaelic: Leitir Fheàrna) is a settlement that lies of the western shore of Loch Duich in Skye and Lochalsh, Highlands of Scotland and is in the council area of Highland. Eilean Donan Castle lies two miles (three kilometres) north of Letterfearn.
