= Taper suspension bridge =

Bridge design patented by James Dredge

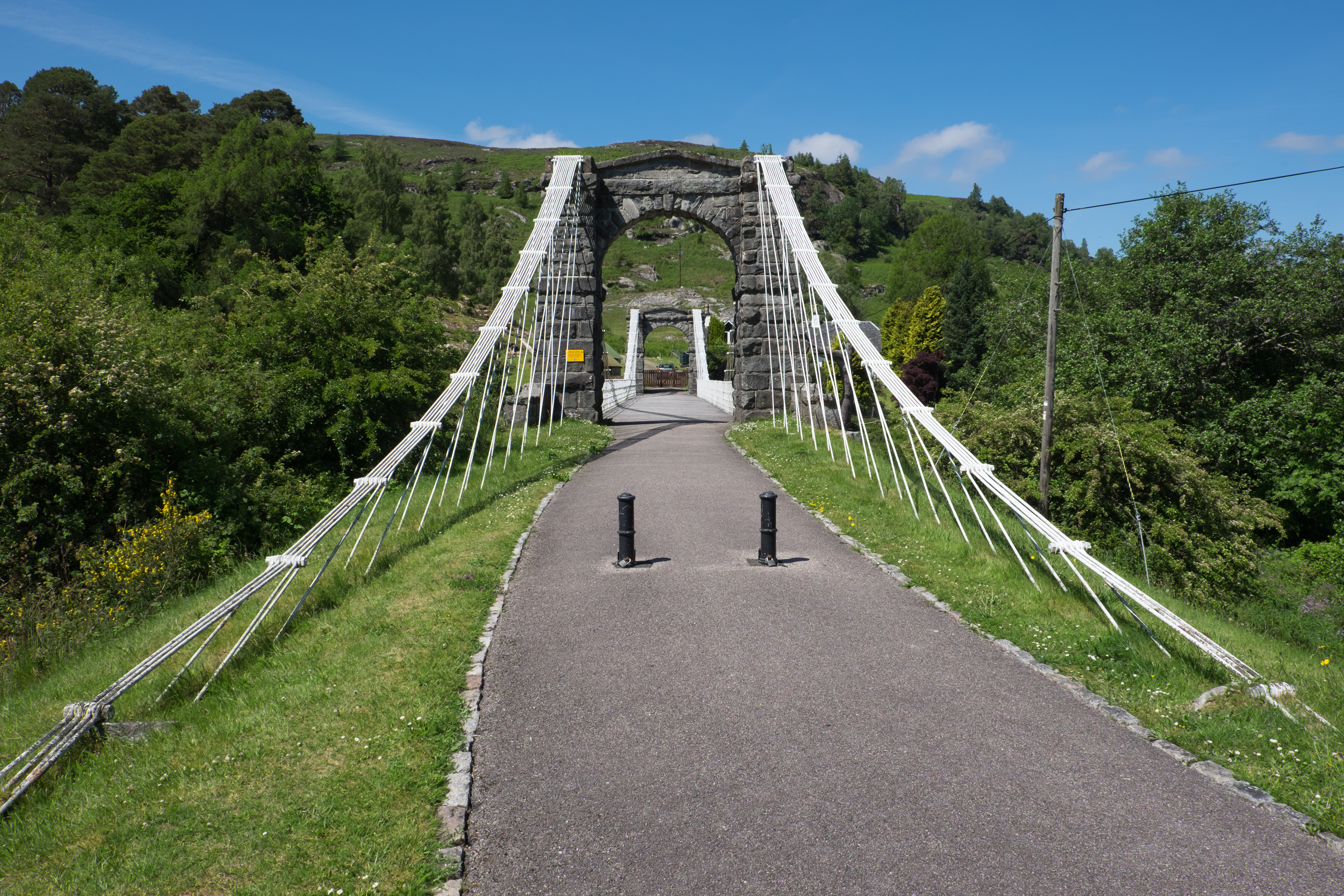
View of the Bridge of Oich showing how the tapered main chain taper is achieved

The taper suspension bridge (also known as the taper principle) is a bridge design patented by James Dredge in 1836.

== The principle ==
On a conventional suspension bridge, the whole deck is suspended by vertical cables, rods or chains from a single cable or chain slung between two supporting towers. The taper suspension bridge, devised by James Dredge in the early nineteenth century, differs from the conventional suspension bridge design in that it effectively functions as a double cantilever bridge. Each opposing cantilever system is self-supporting. The cantilever half-deck structure of each cantilever is suspended from angled chains, which hang from a tapered main attached to the top of the tower and to the outer end of the half-deck. The main chain taper is achieved by incrementally reducing the number of links stacked across the chain's width as it moves farther from the support tower.

The advantage of this taper system is that it results in a more cost-effective design compared to conventional suspension bridge of the time because it uses less iron and is quicker to build.

== Surviving examples ==
Of the 36 known examples of bridges started or completed by Dredge using this design, 7 are known to have survived.

Name	Date built	Original location	Current location	Span	Image
Victoria Bridge	1836	Bath, England	As built	150 feet (46 m)	
Glenarb Bridge	1844	River Blackwater, Caledon, Northern Ireland	Relocated to Caledon		
Caledon Estate Bridge	1845	River Blackwater, Caledon, Northern Ireland	As built		
Stowell Park Bridge	1845	Pewsey, Wiltshire, England	As built		
Second Moyola Park Bridge	1847	Castledawson, Northern Ireland	As built		
Bridge of Oich	1854	River Oich, Aberchalder, Scotland	As built	155 feet 6 inches (47.40 m)	
General's Well Bridge	1853	River Ness, Ness Islands. Inverness	Relocated to Ness Islands Railway, Whin Park, Inverness	97 feet (30 m)	
