= Bridge of Oich =

Bridge in Highland, Scotland

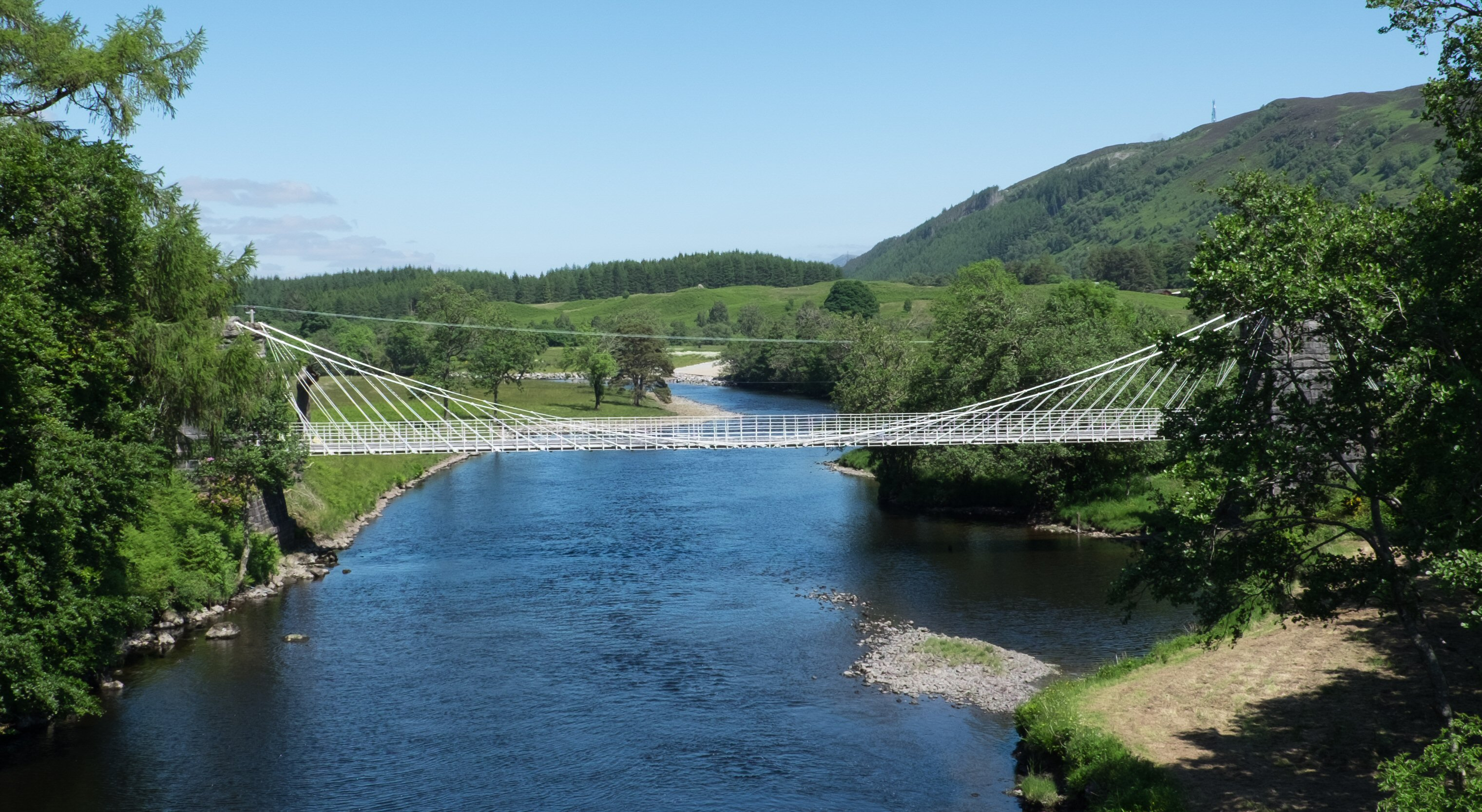
- The Bridge Of Oich in 2016
- Coordinates: 57.093363°N 4.745250°W
- Crosses: River Oich
- Locale: Aberchalder
- Other name(s): Victoria Bridge, Aberchalder
- Maintained by: Historic Environment Scotland
- Website: www.historicenvironment.scot/visit-a-place/places/bridge-of-oich

Characteristics
- Total length: 155 feet 6 inches (47.40 m)
- Width: 17 feet (5.2 m)
- No. of spans: 1

History
- Designer: James Dredge
- Construction end: 1850

Listed Building – Category A
- Official name: Oich, Old Bridge Over River Oich
- Designated: 5 October 1971
- Reference no.: LB1872

Location
- Interactive map of Bridge of Oich

The Bridge of Oich (also known as Victoria Bridge, Aberchalder) is a taper principle suspension bridge, designed by James Dredge, across the River Oich near Aberchalder in Highland, Scotland. The bridge opened in 1854 and was used to take the main road traffic over the river until 1932.

== Overview ==
The bridge was designed by James Dredge, an engineer from England. Dredge used his patented 'taper principle' design for the bridge. The bridge uses a double cantilever system where two opposing cantilevers are supported by suspension chains giving it the appearance of a classic suspension bridge. The span of the bridge is 155 feet 6 inches (47.40 m) and the two main chains are 17 feet (5.2 m) apart. Each of the main chains is made from a series of wrought-iron eye-rods varying in length from 6 feet (1.8 m) to 7 feet 6 inches (2.29 m) and with a nominal diameter of 7/8 inch (22 mm). The main chains hang over 18 feet (5.5 m) high granite towers and one end of each chain is anchored to the bridge at mid-span and the other ends are anchored below ground inland of the bridge. The chains consist of twelve parallel rods at the tower and progressively reduce in width by one link at each joint towards each end of the chains as they get further from the towers. The decking is of timber, supported on trussed wrought-iron transoms.

== History ==
In 1849 an old stone bridge that spanned the River Oich near Aberchalder was destroyed by flooding. To reduce the risk of a new bridge being damaged by similar flooding, it was decided that a single-span bridge was required to replace the old bridge. English engineer James Dredge was engaged to provide such a bridge. Dredge used his patented 'taper principle' for the bridge which was opened in 1854. Dredge's bridge carried the main road traffic across the River Oich until the construction of a two-lane concrete bridge in 1932. Following its withdrawal from service, the bridge fell into disrepair and had to be closed to public use. The bridge, which is now a listed building, was renovated for Historic Scotland in 1997, and returned to use as a public footbridge.

== Images ==
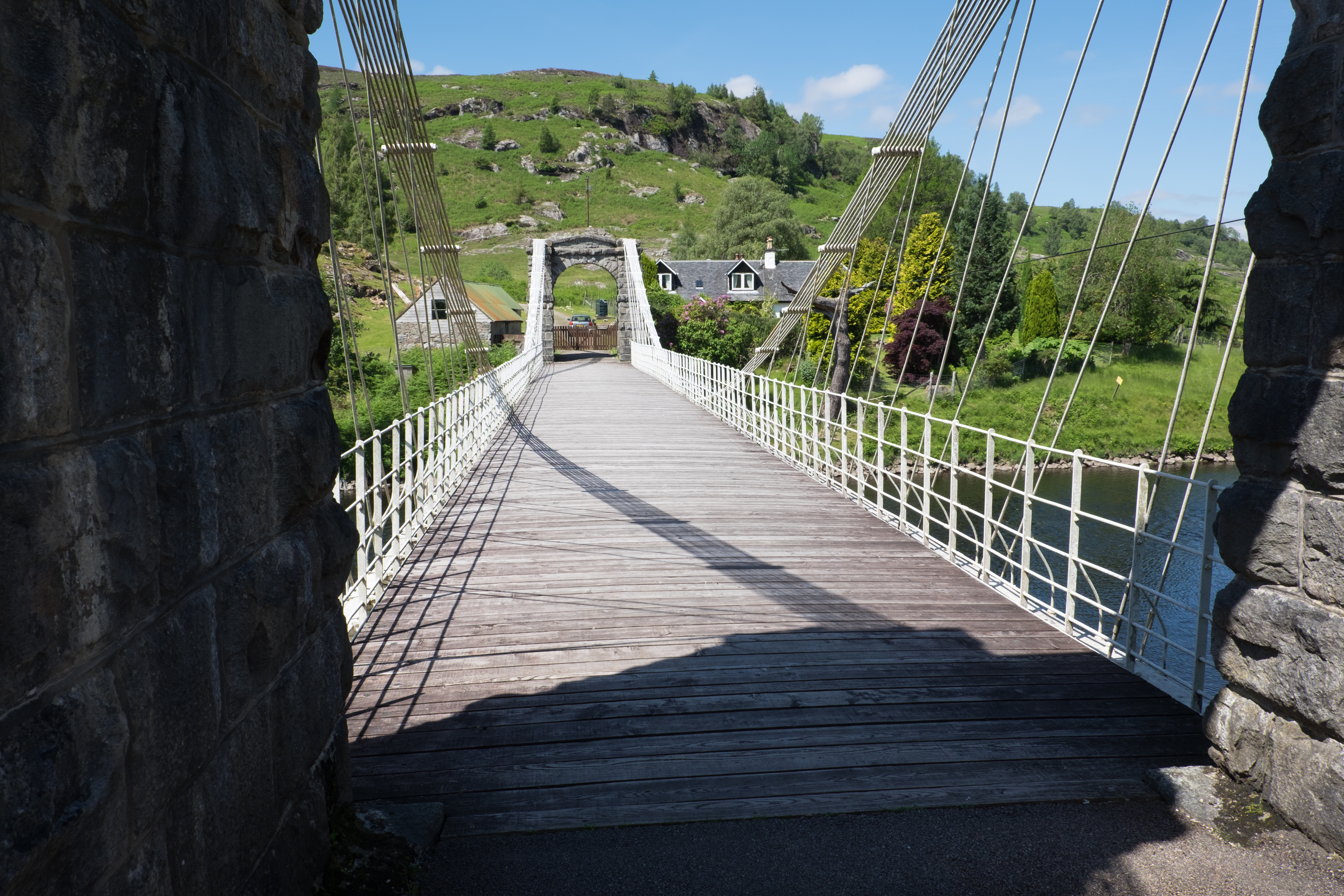
The timber deck

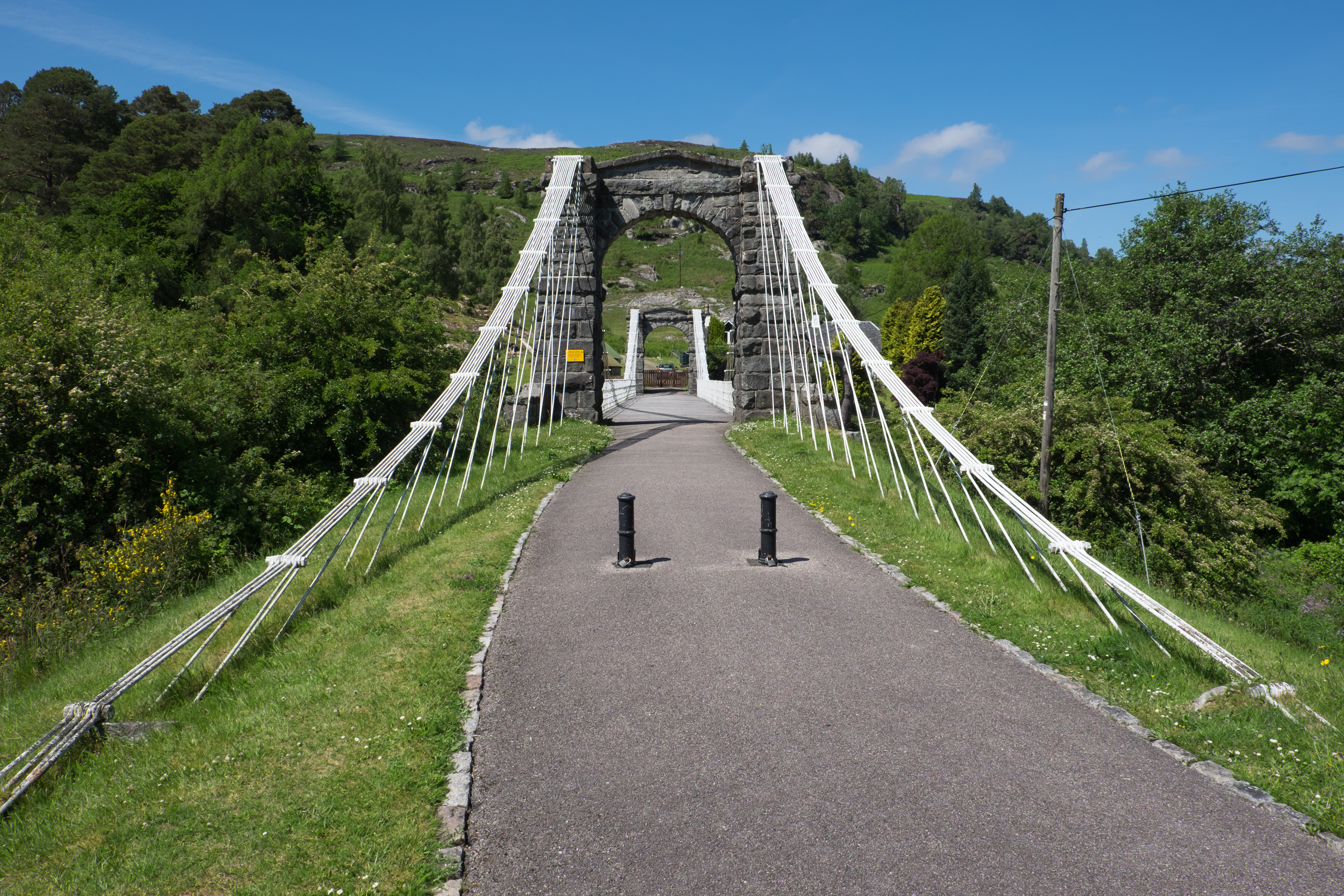
The chains reducing in width

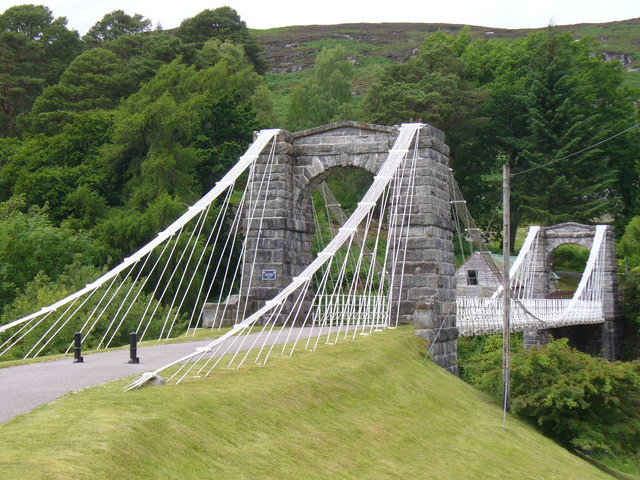
The towers

== See also ==
- List of bridges in Scotland
