= Victoria Bridge, Bath =

Victoria Bridge
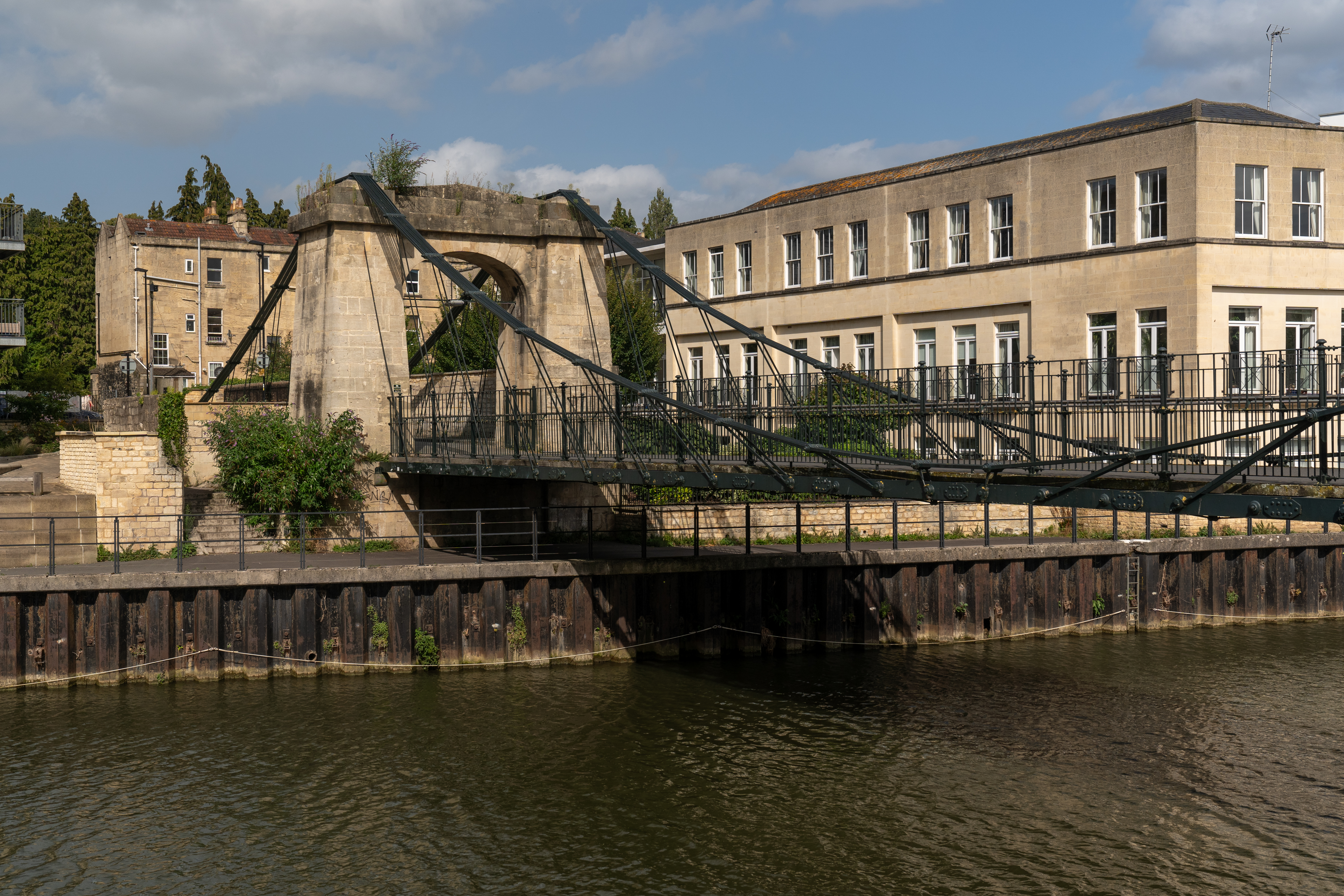
- Coordinates: 51.3834°N 2.3733°W
- Crosses: River Avon
- Locale: Bath, England
- Owner: Bath and North East Somerset Council
- Heritage status: Grade II* listed building
- Preceded by: Midland Bridge
- Followed by: Destructor Bridge

Characteristics
- Design: cable-stayed double cantilever suspension bridge
- Material: Bath stone and iron
- Total length: 45.7 m (150 ft)
- Width: 5.8 m (19 ft)
- No. of spans: 1

History
- Architect: James Dredge, Sr.
- Engineering design by: Motley and Dredge
- Construction start: August 1836
- Construction end: December 1836

Location
- Interactive map of Victoria Bridge

Victoria Bridge in Bath, England, was built in 1836 across the River Avon. The bridge has been recognised as a Grade II* listed building.

Victoria Bridge is an important example of a suspension bridge which initially carried horses and carts but later carried cyclists and pedestrians.

== Construction ==
Victoria Bridge is a Dredge taper bridge, a type which modern viewers often see as a hybrid between a suspension bridge and a cable-stayed bridge, built by Motley and Dredge. It has a span of 45.7 metres (150 ft) with the chains slung from Bath stone towers. The road deck is joined to the chains by iron eyebars, which, unusually, are not vertical. James Dredge who was a brewer in Bath designed the bridge to carry beer from his brewery across the river without using a ferry or having to detour through the city centre. Construction cost £1,760. He patented the 'taper principle' based on using chains rather than cables, as is now more common in suspension bridges. Dredge's bridge design was considered "a very significant yet relatively short-lived phase in suspension bridge development".

The main span chains of Victoria Bridge have 155 links each of which is 2.5 metres (8.2 ft) long and supports two wrought iron hangers. The deck is made of wooden planks.

Initially the bridge was used for horse-drawn carts but later only carried bicycles and pedestrians.

== Closure and restoration ==
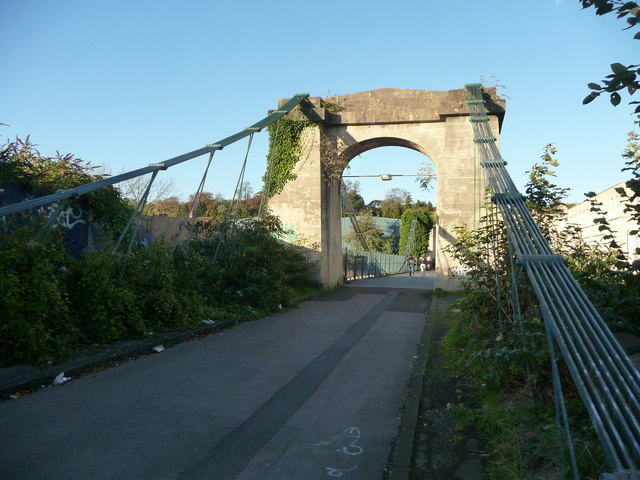
The bridge in 2008

In October 2010 the bridge was closed to users, because of concerns about the safety of the beams and cables. This caused criticism from cycling groups in the city. It was reopened later in October 2010, but then closed again.

Further inspections were carried out by a structural engineer in September 2011. In November 2011 the tow-path was closed and then the navigation itself was closed to all boats. The bridge was listed on the Heritage at Risk Register.

Restoration costs were estimated at £3 million in 2011. Emergency work to prop up either side of the bridge and apply temporary strapping took place in November 2011. Full restoration work was originally planned to be completed by the winter of 2013.

Work on restoring the bridge started in 2014, and an internal structure was fitted to render both the bridge and the canal usable during restorations. The bridge was taken apart and rebuilt with additional steel reinforcing, and repainted dark green. It officially reopened on 15 January 2015.
