= Ness Islands Railway =

Heritage railway line in Scotland

Coordinates: 57.460887°N 4.237135°W

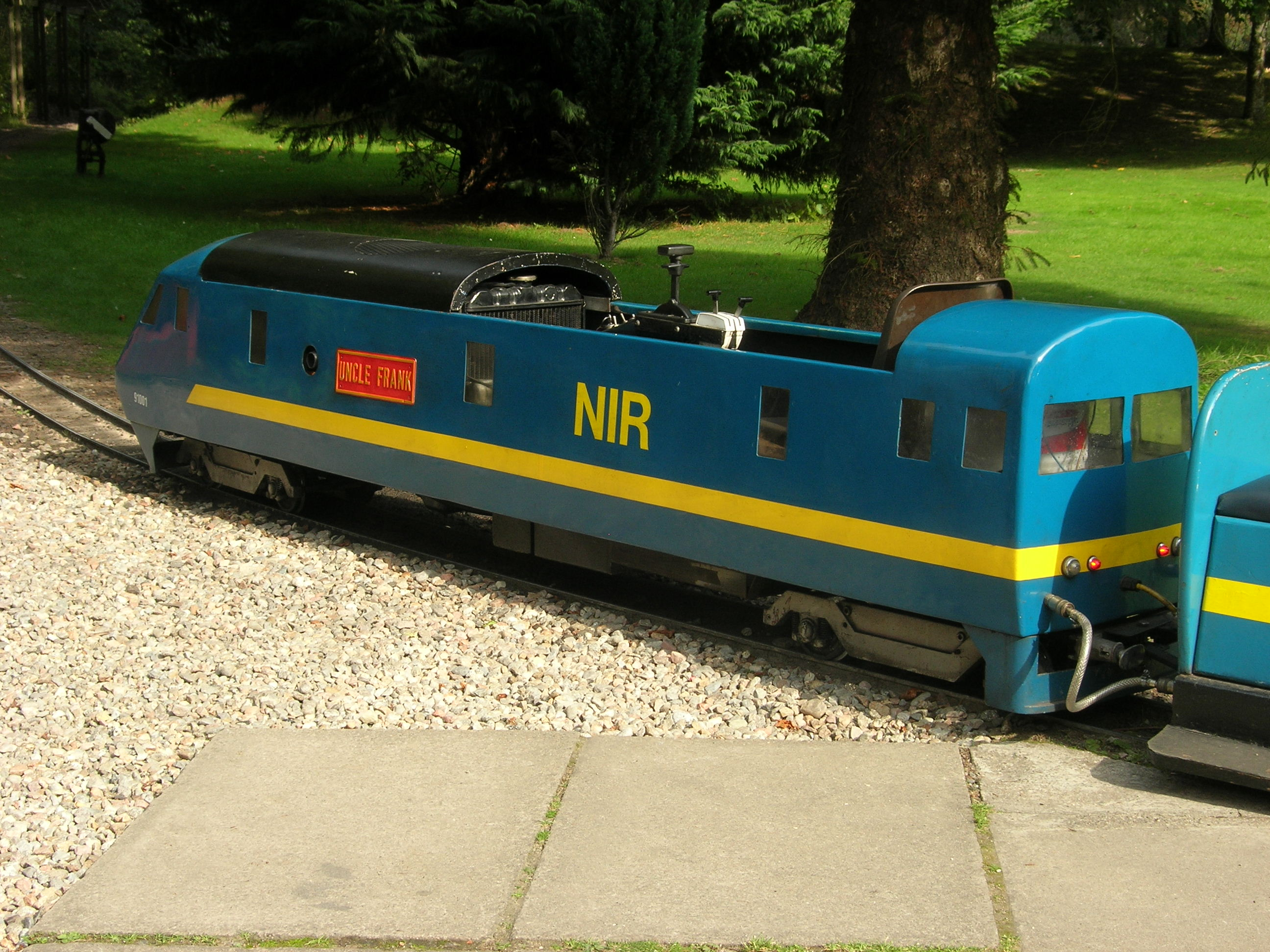
Uncle Frank waiting with a service train.

The Ness Islands Railway is a 7 1/4 in (184 mm) gauge miniature railway in Inverness, Scotland, opened in 1983.

== Overview ==
Operating around a site in Whin Park, near the Ness Islands, an area popular for recreation amongst tourists and the local population, the Ness Islands Railway markets itself as the most northerly public miniature railway in the United Kingdom. The Sanday Light Railway on the Island of Orkney is further north, but is no longer open to the public.

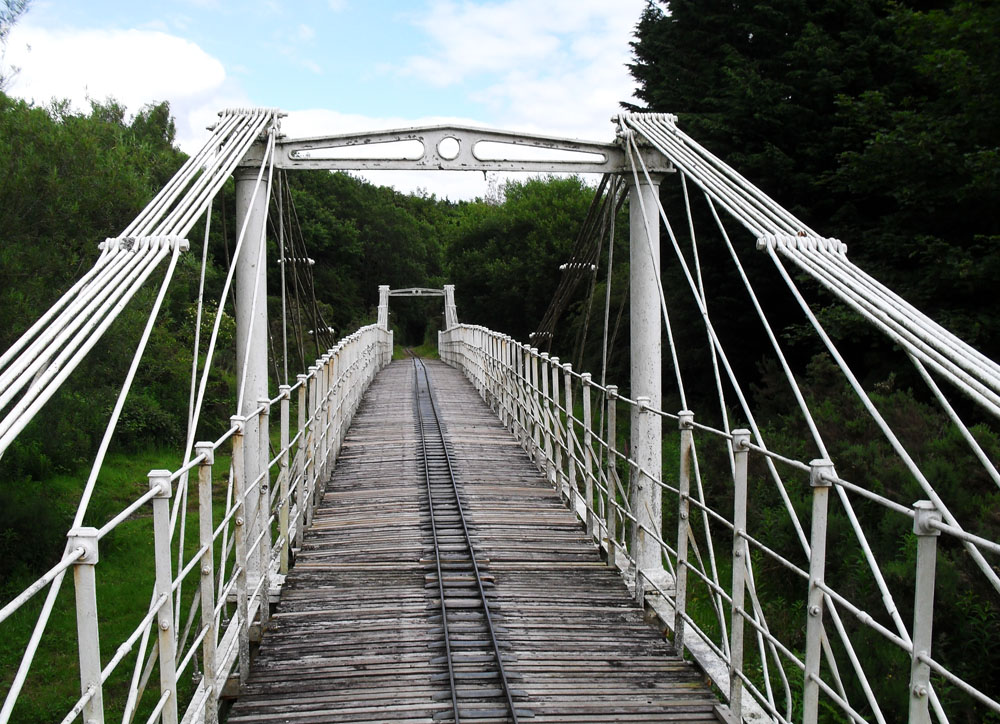
Railway Bridge

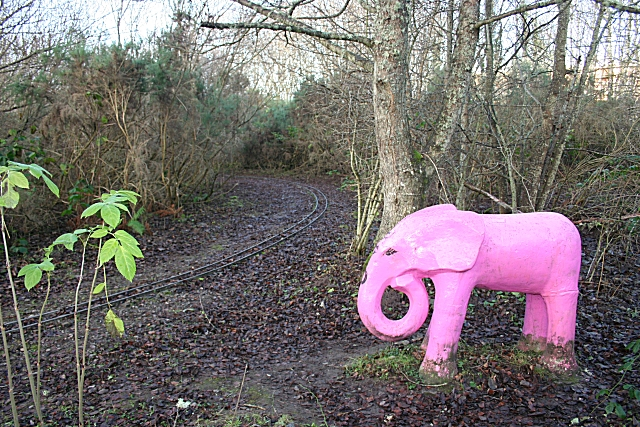
Pink elephant beside the railway

In the 1990s the Ness Islands Railway operated a fleet of replica diesel locomotives, representing in miniature assorted current locomotive designs of British Rail. The locomotive fleet has since been rationalised, with two diesel engines and one steam engine currently in operation:

- Uncle Frank – Class 91 diesel locomotive – 4w4wDH – Built 1991 (Mardyke)
- Uncle John – Class 47 diesel locomotive – 4w4wDH – Built 2011 (Mardyke)
- Chrissy – Tinkerbell Class steam locomotive – 0-4-2 – Built 2012 (Peter Beevers)

The railway features repeat loops, cuttings, and over-bridges, including a 140-foot iron bridge dating from 1837. It usually operates from Easter to October, running at weekends, with a daily service during school holidays.

Since April 2019 Ness Islands Railway has been owned and operated by Highland Hospice. All surplus funds support the delivery of hospice services across the Highlands. In 2020 the bridge on the railway was vandalized and had to be fixed. Most of the money was provided by the public.
