= Chateau DIY =

British reality television series

- Also known as: Escape To The Chateau DIY (2018-2020)
- Genre: Reality television
- Narrated by: Dick Strawbridge (2018-2020); Adjoa Andoh (2021-)
- Country of origin: United Kingdom
- Original language: English
- No. of seasons: 9
- No. of episodes: 105 of Chateau DIY, 14 Chateau DIY at Christmas, 8 Chateau: Living the Dream (list of episodes)

Production
- Production location: France
- Running time: 46 minutes
- Production company: Kindling Media a wholly owned division of Spark Media Partners

Original release
- Network: Channel 4
- Release: 9 April 2018 – present

Related
- Escape to the Chateau

Château DIY (formerly known as Escape to the Château DIY until 2020) is a Channel 4 formatted documentary television series which follows the stories of various families who are renovating châteaux in France, or looking at ones to purchase. The original series Escape to the Château DIY was narrated by Dick Strawbridge who, along with his wife Angel Adoree, provided help and advice to some of these owners until 2020. The programme was spawned from the associated series Escape to the Chateau.

In 2021, the programme was rebranded as Château DIY with new narrator Adjoa Andoh. Chateau DIY has run for 6 series, with further series planned. The brand has been extended with Christmas specials that aired starting in 2021. A spin-off series titled Chateau DIY: Living the Dream, focusing on one chateau per episode, was commissioned in 2023 for More4. Another spin-off series, Chateau DIY: Win The Dream, featuring competing contestant aiming to run their own chateau, started airing on Channel 4 in January 2026.

== Escape to the Château DIY ==
=== Series 1 ===
Episode list - Series 1
Number	Description	Initial air date
1	Dick and Angel provide advice to Johnny on buying a château without it becoming a financial liability.	9 April 2018
2	Jonathan and Michael start their business by booking a wedding for an American couple. Dick and Angel give assistance to Jonnie and Ashley in their continued search for a château.	10 April 2018
3	Philip and Angelina are visited by Dick, along with his engineering skills, who assists them with building a new bridge for the château. At the same time, Jonnie and Ashley continue their hunt for a dream château.	11 April 2018
4	Jonathan and Michael look for a treasure in the caves of their château, in the form of wine that may have been stashed in World War II. Fiona begins renovations of her dining room.	12 April 2018
5	Jonathan and Michael get help from their investors to keep their château renovation afloat, however the investor meeting about their goats does not go well. Philip and Angelina work to repair the toilet during their anniversary party.	13 Apr 2018
6	Mandy and Steve decide to construct a swimming pool for their château in the Dordogne. Michael asks for Angel's help to do an afternoon tea for local residents.	16 April 2018
7	Jonathan and Michael's first château booking for a wedding nears. The wedding preparation brings several problems; an issue with the sewer threatens all of the first floor. Steve and Mandy have problems with their new pool.	17 April 2018
8	The wedding guests for the series' first wedding arrive. Angel, Michael and Jonathan discuss tips on keeping wedding costs down, without sacrificing quality. The pool at Mandy and Steve's château continues to present problems.	18 April 2018
9	A new couple, Tim and Kys in the Dordogne, join the series. Colette and Paul design and introduce a new menu. Donna thinks that a cache of ancient armour has been hidden in the lake of her château.	19 April 2018
10	Dick and Donna continue to search for the armour hidden in the château lake. Tim and Krys work at getting their attic renovations done in time.	20 April 2018
11	Dick constructs a composting toilet to use at outdoor weddings. Billy and Gwendoline decide to rent their château out for weddings, while Tanith and Clive try to curry favour with the locals.	23 April 2018
12	Billy needs to repoint the chimney, however, the task is a lot more difficult than it sounds due to the fact that he is afraid of heights. Meanwhile, time is running out for Marian and Tanya, plus Clive and Tanith get stuck into some hard labour.	24 April 2018
13	Billy, Gwendoline and Michael want to finally move into their château, however, the kitchen is still not finished. Paul and Karen from Château La Perriere devise a plan to get more bookings. Clive and Tanith try to bring a couple together.	25 April 2018
14	Billy and Gwendoline have a boar that is making a mess of the property, which needs hunting. Clive and Tanith utilise their garden by making a dish out of its contents. Paul from Château La Perriere attempt to convert their water tower, to use it as an office.	26 April 2018
15	Billy and his dad do some DIY with levelling the patio. Paul and Karen from Château La Perriere finish their office conversion. Meanwhile, Clive inspects a strange nest in his orangery.	27 April 2018
16	Tim and Margreeth cook up a plan to offer 'gîte timeshares', which is a form of holiday renting to increase income and returning customers. Nicole and Stephan choose to build a tearoom in their hall. Alison and Paul are adding to the château features by creating a 'wedding terrace'.	30 April 2018
17	Nicole asks Angel for some styling advice about wallpaper. Easter is coming and Tim and Margreeth are getting prepared. Meanwhile, Paul and Alison show off their new wedding terrace with a party.	1 May 2018
18	Tim and Margreeth's concentration is on refurbishing a caravan in their park. Paul and Alison have not given up on the possibilities that secret tunnels exist on the property.	2 May 2018
19	Dick and Angel give some advice and plans for Tim and Margreeth's business in hospitality. Stephanie gets ready for her singles weekend event. Sophie and James search for needed funds to keep their château afloat.	3 May 2018
20	Tim and Margreeth get started on their new business venture with research. Stephanie's singles weekend event is here. Sophie and James hold a walking event near their château.	4 May 2018

=== Series 2 ===
Episode list - Series 2
Number	Description	Initial air date
1	Dick helps Elaine and David in their search for the ideal château. Tim and Krys prepare to re-launch their business.	18 February 2019
2	Tim and Krys work quickly to prepare their château for guests; Elaine and David make a visit to a former 17th-century priory in Normandy; and Steve and Angela work to improve a master bedroom.	19 February 2019
3	Belinda visits Dick and Angel's château where they learn about decoupage, and potential château owners Elaine and David make a visit a 19th-century château that has 18 rooms along with two gîtes.	20 February 2019
4	Dick gives Tim a lesson on how to stage a gourmet weekend; Angel and Krys discuss their château lives. Belinda and Lee welcome their first guests.	21 February 2019
5	Tim and Krys' first gastronomic weekend arrives; Belinda and Lee play host to their largest event so far, including dancing and a serious meal; Dick visits Angela and Steve to give them a hand.	22 February 2019
6	Tim and Rebecca get help from Dick with their dilapidated château with no plumbing. Edward and Anna plan for the 185 guests who will arrive at their fairy-tale château, but the outcome does not match the plan.	25 February 2019
7	Tim and Rebecca get their friends to help them with renovation work. Dick and Angel are hosts to a special wedding for their close friends. Motorcycle-obsessed couple Martin and Kim look for their perfect château.	26 February 2019
8	Tim and Rebecca fight to get their château in tip-top shape for a visiting tour operator. Martin and Kim continue to search for their château, while Karen and Paul from Château La Perriere return with their children.	27 February 2019
9	Tim and Rebecca get a booking and then prepare for their first revenue guests. Martin and Kim intensify their château search. Paul and Karen from Château La Perriere build a movie screening room.	28 February 2019
10	Anna and Edward put on another big wedding, but Edward's is of action. Dick visits Tim and Rebecca when the couple run into problems. Karen and Paul from Château La Perriere tries to do all they can to get their first wedding.	1 March 2019
11	Ongoing château work includes maintaining an elevated pool and a maze, and the preparations required for the fast-approaching season of weddings.	4 March 2019
12	Dick and Paul cut Vitrolite vintage tiles to be used in an art deco bathroom, while Abbie paints bedroom furniture. Julia visit more châteaux with her sisters.	5 March 2019
13	Mariam and Johnno move into their new château, along with their teenage son Monty, but discover there is no running water. The builders are at work in every room.	6 March 2019
14	Emma and Paul are desperate to fill the lake, to make it ready for the upcoming artists' retreat. Angel helps Abbie and Karen with money-saving tips for their new wedding business.	7 March 2019
15	Emma and Paul invite the mayor and local residents to see the work they have been doing on the face of their château. Paul designs, builds and fits two heavy balconies.	8 March 2019
16	Dick helps Erin and JB, new château owners. Tim and Margreeth begin another venture to make money.	11 March 2019
17	Dick works on his temperamental van. Erin and JB begin work on the honeymoon suite and the solarium/sun room at their château. Alison and Paul make a discovery.	12 March 2019
18	Erin and JB are hosts to a 90th birthday party. May, along with her family, work to turn a dilapidated outbuilding into a new yoga retreat. Tim and Margreeth welcome their wedding party.	13 March 2019
19	Dick helps Erin and JB to repair their rusted hinges. Wedding season ends at Tim and Margreeth's château. May and her son Jack prepare the new yoga room.	14 March 2019
20	Erin and JB launch their new château business by hosting a tea party. Charles, owner of Château Saint Loup, who was the inspiration for Puss in Boots, is introduced.	15 March 2019
21	The British artist Johnny, with his girlfriend Ashley, stage a plan to have artist workshops. Ben and Billie, both musicians, decide to put on foodie events. Nicole and Stefan are back with a new business idea.	18 March 2019
22	Nicole and Stefan start working on the old gatehouse. Billie makes a visit to Angel to gather ideas for natural designs. Johnny and Ashley speak with Dick about the best plan for working on their library.	19 March 2019
23	Dick helps restore Ben's traditional wine press. Johnny and Ashley finish the library ceiling with a nude painting of Ashley. Stefan has a last-minute dash to finish an apartment.	20 March 2019
24	It is National Monuments Day at Nicole and Stefan's château and the gatehouse refurbishment is put on hold. Wendy and Marcus launch their wedding business with a raucous hen party.	21 March 2019
25	Nicole and Stefan continue their renovation of their historic château in Lucheux. Ben and Billie host their foodie evening with a pop-up restaurant in their orangery.	22 March 2019
26	Stephanie builds her mother an apartment in her 16th-century château. Jayne and Steve prepare four themed bedrooms as part of their new business.	25 March 2019
27	Dick makes a visit to Stephanie to help her to get the bread oven working. Annabelle and Justin come back from their holiday only to find that the château has been infested by bees. Jayne and Steve finish work on the nature room.	26 March 2019
28	Angel helps Stephanie to add frames to her father's artwork. Justin and Annabelle mount their shutters. Jayne and Steve finish the small French room.	27 March 2019
29	Dick makes a visit to Stephanie's château to see the new boiler that will be used in her mother's apartment, but the news is not good and mum Isobel is displeased. Jayne and Steve fight with a huge four-poster bed.	28 March 2019
30	Stephanie finishes her mother's apartment. Jayne and Steve complete the Oriental Room, making them ready for paying guests. Tim, Sasha and Lily operate a wedding business in their château.	29 March 2019

=== Series 3 ===
Episode list - Series 3
Number	Description	Initial air date
1	The first winter guests arrive at Tim and Rebecca's château. Amy and Marc are turning their château into a base for yoga retreats and as a B&B. Ben and Billie start renovating their final room, currently a junk room but previously a small library.	28 October 2019
2	Amy and Marc need a sewage system and want to make an eco-friendly version. Tim and Rebecca are creating a first family suite. Ben and Billie show off their fossil-rich landscape and visit Angel for advice regarding a display table.	29 October 2019
3	Dick shares ideas with Ben and Billie. Tim and Rebecca re-gravel their nearly kilometre-long driveway. Amy and Marc find a medieval fireplace behind a modern fire and wall.	30 October 2019
4	Amy and Marc work on a bathroom stuck in need of modernising or restoring. Angel provides Rebecca with advice and ideas for kitchen renovation. Ben and Billie need to be ready for Billie's brother's wedding.	31 October 2019
5	Ben and Billie welcome some 60 guests to their château. Tim and Rebecca are rationalising their two kitchens, but it takes a lot of work. Dorothy and Arthur, Dick and Angel's children, house their geese.	1 November 2019
6	Lee and Belinda plan an event for Christmas. Stephanie and assistants plan to use the bread oven and an old range to prepare two birds for Christmas dinner. Jayne and Steve have much to prepare for a family and friend's soiree.	4 November 2019
7	After a storm affects Lee and Belinda's château, a hole in the roof means Lee must face his fears in order to save money. A wallpaper mural mounting project tests both Jayne and Steve. Stephanie enlists advice from Angel with reviving the new B&B en-suite.	5 November 2019
8	Stephanie's B&B requires assistance to get it finished. A first wedding booking looms for Lee and Belinda. Jayne and Steve send for their friends.	6 November 2019
9	Lee and Belinda work some more on their outdoor venue. Stephanie and friends get to restore their greenhouse. Jayne and Steve find a use for the disused orangery at one end of their château.	7 November 2019
10	Stephanie's renovations start in a stable to create an art studio. Lee installs a solar panel system from scraps to heat the outdoor swimming pool. Jayne creates a mural up a grand spiral staircase in advance of their first guests' arrival.	8 November 2019
11	Dick and Angel relive their laying electrical cable outside their château. Edward and Anna need to prepare for the new events season. New château owners Donna and Paul make the move into their new but dilapidated home.	11 November 2019
12	Adam's quest to buy a château takes him to the Pyrenees. Donna and Paul find scores of dead bees in one of their chimneys. Dick expounds on how to enjoy château life.	12 November 2019
13	Alex and Ithaca have inherited a 300-year-old château – but need to maintain it against all challenges. Dick's children Arthur and Dorothy rescue baby toads at their château. Edward and Anna have to negotiate with their guests regarding a downturn in the weather.	13 November 2019
14	Donna and Paul take on their most challenging project so far. Alex and Ithaca raise cash with garden events, particularly targeting the repair bill for their château's roof.	14 November 2019
15	The Strawbridges travel to the beaches at Saint-Malo. Donna and Paul have a grand opening for the new tea room at their château, and the mayor is invited.	15 November 2019

=== Series 4 ===
Series 4 commenced on 23 March 2020 and was scheduled to run to 30 episodes. Covid-19 interrupted filming and editing, so only 20 episodes were broadcast up to 17 April 2020.

Episode list - Series 4
Number	Description	Initial air date
1	Fiona fights with the sub-zero weather while putting up wallpaper in a room she's renovating for her daughter. Tim and Sasha attempt to improve their income during the low-season with a New Year's Eve party, while Erin and JB begin to tackle their south wing, which was last used as a nursing home.	23 March 2020
2	Erin and JB start their transformation of their château's ruined orangery, trying to turn it into a top-tier venue. Fiona continues working on her daughter's bedroom, and Sasha and Tim install a jacuzzi into their spa.	24 March 2020
3	Tim and Sasha work on a plan to use their château's empty bathing pool. Erin and JB host a Midsummer Night's Dream party for friends from the UK, and Fiona prepares her château for a party to celebrate its 845th anniversary.	25 March 2020
4	Tim and Rebecca work to transform their aviary into a bijou brocante. Fiona begins work to renovate a luxury suite. Tim and Sasha battle the summer heat as they tend to landscaping issues before the wedding season kicks off.	26 March 2020
5	Rebecca and Tim begin to create a new 2-bedroom guesthouse, then pivot to clearing the barn and preparing for a last-minute workshop booking. Fiona finishes her luxury suite and Angela and Steve run into a number of problems in updating the poolhouse kitchen. Angel and Dick give a makeover to their magnificent 5 metres (16 ft) tall staircase.	27 March 2020
6	Stephanie restores a carriage for her mother's wedding, while Debbie and Nigel start their new French life and begin to prepare their château to host guests. George and Sarah meet with a wedding planner to begin the process of turning their château from a home into a space suitable for hosting weddings.	30 March 2020
7	Over at Château de Brives, George and Sarah's builders unearth a secret room that they think could be hiding vintage cognac. Stephanie continues to prepare for her mother's wedding, and Debbie and Nigel count down until their first guests arrive.	31 March 2020
8	Stephanie hosts her mother Isabelle's wedding at Château de Lalande. George and Sarah lay a concrete floor and prepare their coachhouse to host events, and Debbie and Nigel transform the conservatory at the back of their château.	1 April 2020
9	Debbie and Nigel have their salon renovations delayed by a last-minute unexpected booking. Stephanie begins to update a self-contained apartment in the oldest section of the château while George and Sarah book and prepare for the first wedding at their property.	2 April 2020
10	Sarah and George encounter electricity problems during the wedding. Stephanie has unexpected scheduling difficulties, and so pivots from redecorating the Renaissance-style gîte to finishing off a more modern one. Debbie and Nigel update their garden and roof terrace.	3 April 2020
11	Johnno and Mariam build a French parterre garden. Emma and Paul begin their renovations. Janet and Phillip move into Château de la Fare.	6 April 2020
12	Phillip and Janet work madly on the bridal suite for their daughter Penny's wedding. Emma and Paul complete their Mackintosh-themed bedroom.	7 April 2020
13	Emma and Paul get ready for an important booking. Johnno and Mariam begin a transformation of their château's grand salon, while Karen and Paul transform the old stable.	8 April 2020
14	Emma and Paul begin a new garden project. The costs of Karen and Paul's roof are beyond what was expected, and Johnno and Mariam launch their château as an events venue.	9 April 2020
15	Mariam and Johnno begin the restoration of their château's original bread oven. Karen and Paul prepare for a special party in their renovated coach house and stable block. Emma and Paul work on renovating another bedroom in their west wing, incorporating different Art Nouveau and Art Deco elements. Angel discovers a unique cover for a radiator while bargain hunting.	10 April 2020
16	Debbie and Simon are ready to move into their château; Wendy and Marcus's have their willpower tested. Belinda and Lee expand their events portfolio.	13 April 2020
17	Wendy and Marcus work to renovate their barn; wet weather may cause problems for Belinda and Lee's upcoming fashion show. Debbie and Simon prepare for a trial weekend of their new Chinese cooking classes.	14 April 2020
18	Wendy and Marcus get ready for a VIP visitor, while Amy and Marc plans and begin to transform outbuildings for their new yoga retreat centre. Belinda and Lee work to upgrade the floor of the donjon (their château's keep), which serves as their event space.	15 April 2020
19	Amy and Marc battle brambles and needlework as they continue to develop their estate, this time clearing space for guided meditation outlook. Ben and Billie begin building their glamping site. Wendy and Marcus give their wedding venue a temporary facelift to match their clients' steampunk aesthetic.	16 April 2020
20	Amy and Marc work to get the barn and café ready before their baby arrives, and host their first yoga class. Ben and Billie get to work on their boathouse, and Wendy and Marcus host a hen night, but struggle with transportation delays and language barriers.	17 April 2020

=== Series 5 ===
Series 5 commenced on 30 November 2020.

Episode list - Series 5
Number	Description	Initial air date
1	Clive, Karen, Ross and Abbie work to give the pool house a desperately needed makeover. Tim and Krys start work on their barn. Tim and Margreeth work to transform the tired library.	30 November 2020
2	Clive, Karen, Ross and Abbie prepare for the season's first château wedding. Tim and Krys get rid of the unsightly render in their barn. Tim and Margreeth make a potager garden.	1 December 2020
3	Julia calls in her sister to help take on work at her new home. On a quest for self-sufficiency, Tim finishes the greenhouse as a surprise for Margreeth's birthday.	2 December 2020
4	Julia starts renovating the dining room, with the hope that she will be able to host her family at Christmas. Joshua and Lee from Manchester search for the perfect château.	3 December 2020
5	Tim and Margreeth play host to their first fine-dining and floristry weekend. Dick and Angel renovate the coach house's patio at their château. Julia finds out that the ancient system of caves below her château will cause delays in updating her septic system. Joshua and Lee find a very promising property.	4 December 2020
6	Anna and Philipp receive the keys for their new château. Johnny and Ashley discuss their plans for their château's orangery. Pregnant Anna goes into labour, and Dick starts some dinosaur DIY.	7 December 2020
7	The English-French language problem almost causes Johnny and Ashley trouble. Anna and Philipp investigate their ancient well. Anna and Edward start on their landscaping.	8 December 2020
8	After searching for six years, Iain and Kate may have found the perfect château. Johnny and Ashley leave some work until the last minute while launching their new art gallery. Anna and Philipp continue to work on the family apartment.	9 December 2020
9	With winter coming, Anna and Philipp start work on the bedrooms for their girls. Iain and Kate continue their château-hunting.	10 December 2020
10	Mark, Becky and George try to see if they can use a well on their property as a water source for a gîte. Is Iain and Kate's search for a château finally over? Anna and Philipp have a disagreement on taste.	11 December 2020

== Château DIY ==
In December 2020, Channel 4 ordered 60 new episodes from Spark Media Partners for broadcast in 2021 and 2022. The programme was renamed Château DIY following the decision by the Strawbridges to withdraw from the DIY offshoot and retain the brand Escape to the Château.

=== Series 1 ===
Series 1 of Château DIY, presented by Adjoa Andoh, with 30 episodes, began airing on 27 September 2021 on Channel 4.

Episode list - Series 1
Number	Description	Initial air date
1	Edward converts a network of caves underneath the château into a venue for wine-tasting and functions. Nigel and Debbie creates a holiday suite for a family. Jayne and Steve plan a garden and plunge pool on the terrace	27 September 2021
2	Edward and Anna have the pool house rebuilt. Debbie and Nigel renovate a cellar for their own temporary use so they may rent out their bedroom. Rebecca and Tim harvest raspberries for making jam. Jayne and Steve create an opulent Renaissance-theme room.	28 September 2021
3	Edward completes his caves project. Lee goes metal-detecting along the riverbank. Julia converts her guardian's cottage into a gîte. Mariam wants to set up a brocante in her breakfast room.	29 September 2021
4	Ben and Billie renovate two rooms for a honeymoon suite. Lydia and Gary look to buy a château. Anna and Edward prepare for their first wedding of the year.	30 September 2021
5	Ben and Vanessa renovate their ballroom. Ben and Billie tile the bathroom and install a Jacuzzi. Karen tackle some projects with the help of her teenage son Tom.	1 October 2021
6	Tim and Rebecca continue to renovate the first floor of their gîte. Helen and Matt aim to transform their château into a high-end B&B and wedding venue. Belinda and Lee give their kitchen a makeover with a budget.	4 October 2021
7	Helen and Matt create an armoury-theme reception room. Lee and Belinda try to finish their kitchen before guests arrive. Donna and Paul remove a wall and a staircase in their salon.	5 October 2021
8	Helen and Matt start to transform the turret into the bridal suite. Anna and Philipp want to create a hedge around the grounds. Donna and Paul host a Burns Night dinner.	6 October 2021
9	Helen and Matt open Château la Briance to guests on Valentine's Day, while Anna and Philipp need to finish their top floor family apartment. Donna and Paul reuse the old cornice to complete their guest salon.	7 October 2021
10	Donna and Paul create a new suite. Anna and Philipp clear out the chimney, while Erin and JB create a bedroom in the turret for JB's sister.	8 October 2021
11	Wendy & Marcus convert the upper floor of a barn to an apartment. Alison and Zion search for a new château. Angela and Steve turn a champagne bowl into a bathroom basin in one of their turrets. Anna and Edward make their own candles.	11 October 2021
12	Marc starts to restore a medieval well in what they plane to be their herb garden. Alison and Zion continue their search for a château. Sasha decorates a table with painting. Angela and Steve continue with the renovation of their suite.	12 October 2021
13	Stephanie gives the entrance hall a makeover. Alison and Zion visit another château for sale that may be their home. Angela and Steve finish their Monet suite. Donna and Paul host a party for the Tour de France, which passes near their château.	13 October 2021
14	Sarah and George get a guest suite ready the wedding season. Tim and Rebecca fit the doors to the gîte. Stephanie and Gerry paints their tower staircase red and create a pigeon tower. Philip makes a bench from an old bed frame for the kitchen.	14 October 2021
15	Tim and Krys buy a former hotel, Domaine de la Barde, that could prove to be a more challenging project. Tim and Sasha create a secret path through a bamboo forest for a view previously hidden. Sara and George organise a wedding held at their château by themselves.	15 October 2021
16	Jayne and Steve give their master suite a major upgrade. Matt and Helen construct an English bandstand in their grounds. Ben and Billie start their biggest renovation to date with their grand ballroom.	18 October 2021
17	Matt and Helen turn their orangery into a reception room for weddings and other events. Sarah and George convert a cellar into a cognac and wine tasting venue. Ben starts the ballroom renovation.	19 October 2021
18	Anna and Philipp renovate a new suite and a guest washroom. Tim and Krys recreate the topiary hedges in the formal garden. Sarah and George get their cognac cellar ready. Anna and Ed create a welcoming noticeboard with wine corks.	20 October 2021
19	Anna and Philipp try to recreate an old garden. Julia converts her bedroom into a bridal suite. Tim and Krys try reestablishing the interweaving hornbeam hedges and plant an apple orchard. Tim, Sasha and daughter pick grapefruits for making jam.	21 October 2021
20	Anna and Philipp struggle with the renovation of a fourth guest suite. Tim and Krys try restoring the fountain in the garden. Julia digs for a pool and continues with renovating her wedding and event space.	22 October 2021
21	Clive and daughter Abbie add a makeup salon to their bridal suite, while Tim and Rebecca focus on adding a kitchen to their gîte. Donna and Paul replace the crumbling termite-damaged floorboard of their Royale Suite.	25 October 2021
22	Abbie, Clive and Karen start a major project to create an indoor function room. Tim and Rebecca plants an orchard and add a kitchen unit and worktop in the gîte. Donna and Paul make a bed from an antique oak sideboard.	26 October 2021
23	Angela and Steve convert a chai (wine store) into a space for their sons' weddings, starting by adding a large door. Tim and Rebecca complete and furnish the kitchen of their gîte. Clive and family continue with their function room. Billie and Ben make an enclosure for quails.	27 October 2021
24	Angela and Steve create an opening in the wall for a door to the chai. Edward removes a tall oak tree growing too close to the château. Clive and family install their LED dance floor.	28 October 2021
25	Abbie, Clive and Karen complete the renovation of their function room Edward and Anna put the finishing touches to their entrance. Angela and Steve finally add a door to the chai. Debbie and Nigel refurbish an old piano for their back salon.	29 October 2021
26	Debbie and Nigel upgrade the fireplace in their salon. Tim create a bamboo tunnel for growing flowers while Sasha and daughter try creating a xeriscape garden. Belinda and Lee convert an outbuilding into an art gallery and brocante.	1 November 2021
27	Tim and Sacha finish with the tunnel. Stephanie aims to transform a fishing pond into a swimming pool. Belinda and Lee finish their new gallery for a grand opening. Julia add some hammocks for an outdoor space.	2 November 2021
28	Stephanie renovates a hallway and decorate it with her porcelain collection. Donna and Paul replace a window with an extra-large one for the landing of stairway. Janet and Philip replicate a turret that has been removed.	3 November 2021
29	Ben and Billie decide how to decorate their ballroom. Philip has a windy problem with the turret rebuild. Edward builds a tree house for his son.	4 November 2021
30	Ben and Billie still have their ballroom to finish, while Julia sees her long-delayed pool completed. Janet and Philip top their new turret with a spire.	5 November 2021

=== Christmas 2021 ===
Four Christmas-themed episodes were broadcast on Channel 4 commencing on 20 December 2021.

Episode list - Series 2
Number	Description	Initial air date
1		20 December 2021
2		21 December 2021
3		22 December 2021
4		23 December 2021

=== Series 2 ===
Series 2 of Chateau DIY began airing on Channel 4 on 30 May 2022. Fifteen episodes were broadcast.

Episode list - Series 2
Number	Description	Initial air date
1	Tim and Rebecca convert their stable to a gîte, while Tim and Krys renovate a former hotel. Philip and Janet work on a guest suite with the help of French volunteers.	30 May 2022
2	Tim and Krys installing a grand central fountain in their formal garden. Tim and Rebecca finish their gîte, while Philip and volunteers repair the window.	31 May 2022
3	Tim and Margreeth create sensory barefoot path in the woods. Philip and Janet start decorating the suite. Matt and Helen renovate a horse-drawn carriage and paint the stairwell. Julia decorates a small chapel.	1 June 2022
4	Tim create a yoga retreat area and a log sweat lodge. Alison and Zion explore their new château. Clive, Karen and daughter Abbie get their château ready for the wedding season, while harvesting the raspberry.	2 June 2022
5	Ithaca and Alex prepare for their annual brocante and flower fair. Alison and Zion discover a problem in their new château. Tim and Margreeth transform a stable to a cheese and wine tasting venue.	3 June 2022
6	Edward makes a mistake replacing two tall shutters. May and Guy begin to overhaul the grounds of the swimming pool and the yoga studio areas. Becky and Mark create a guest bedroom from two small ones.	6 June 2022
7	Becky encounters a problem with the wall in the guest room renovation. May and Guy finish their ground overhaul. Edward creates a surprise family terrace for Anna in the heat. Stephanie throws a birthday party.	7 June 2022
8	Amy and Marc start a winemaking project. Edward makes something for his parents. Becky and Mark renovate guest bedrooms for visiting relatives.	8 June 2022
9	Amy and Marc prepare their gardens to host a picnic event, while Philip and Angelina get busy ahead of the events season. Becky and Mark ready their rooms for visitors.	9 June 2022
10	Belinda and Lee renovate an outbuilding to turn into a gîte. Philip and Angelina repairs bridge over the moat. Amy and Marc play host to the Heritage Society.	10 June 2022
11	Ben and Billie finally finish the renovation of their ballroom. Christina and Sassan go hunting for a château. Anna wants a hog roaster and Edward has trouble making it.	13 June 2022
12	Edward and Anna host their first wedding of the year with Edward serving as chef. Christina and Sassan search for their château. Emma and Paul start work on a bar for an outdoor venue. Paul and Donna get a room ready for B&B.	14 June 2022
13	Debbie and Nigel build a new deck for their hot tub, while Donna and Paul embark on creating their own private apartment in their attic. Emma and Paul complete the outdoor bar for a party. Billie harvest and preserve the plums.	15 June 2022
14	Erin and JB need to fix a hole in the roof. Stephanie and Philippe create a tartan-themed apartment for friend Jerry. Sarah and George try renovating a cottage for their own use on a budget.	16 June 2022
15	Stephanie continues to renovate the apartment. Erin and JB try fixing their collapsed moat by themselves, but repairing the medieval stone walls is challenging. Sarah and George prepare to host the local village fete.	17 June 2022

=== Series 3 ===
Series 3 of Chateau DIY began airing on Channel 4 on 22 August 2022. Thirty episodes were broadcast.

Episode list - Series 3
Number	Description	Initial air date
1	Matt & Helen at Château La Briance convert a wine cellar into dungeon-themed dining area. At Château de la Fare, Janet and Philip try to recreate the old grand entrance gates. Alison & Zion redecorate the salon to throw a birthday party at Château de la Boutiniére.	22 August 2022
2	Zion throws his 60th birthday party at the château, but has to fix a power failure issue. At Château des Vieilles Vignes, Nick and Nicole want to create an open plan entrance hall for their retreat business. Ben and Billie start to renovate a studio apartment at Château La Grande Maison.	23 August 2022
3	Donna and Paul at Château de Saugé decorate their own private apartment in the attic. Julia converts a former artist's studio into her personal space at Château Mas du Pradié. Ben and Billie renovate a two-bedroom apartment.	24 August 2022
4	Ben and Billie continue with their renovation of the apartment, while Abbie, Clive, Karen and Ross create a terrace dining area at Château du Doux in the Dordogne. Donna and Paul need to create an en-suite bathroom in the circular tower.	25 August 2022
5	At Château du Doux, unexpected snow hits the first wedding of the year. Donna and Pau finish their apartment. Ben and Billie add a chandelier and a gold-framed wall art to the apartments.	26 August 2022
6	Philip and Janet aim to complete their third guest suite by fitting the kitchenette and bathroom. At Château de La Vigne, May & Guy upgrade their kitchen space. Tim and Krys at Domaine de la Barde upgrade the reception area of their chateau.	29 August 2022
7	Tim and Krys want to fit a new professional kitchen and an alfresco dining area at the château. At Château du Puits es Pratx, Tim struggle to add a 100-year-old olive tree to the garden. Christina and Sassan move into their new home, Château de Lassalle.	30 August 2022
8	Alison and Zion want to rebuild a vegetable garden, starting by moving the polytunnel. Tim and Sasha create a bridal suite by connecting two rooms. Paul and Debbie, having moved into Château de Cadres, start a large-scale kitchen project with the rest of the Cherry family.	31 August 2022
9	Nigel and Debbie decide to build a gravel garden at Château Gioux. Paul and Debbie want to install a range cooker in their kitchen. At Château de Brives, Sarah aim to create a floral arch for wedding, while George wash the château on a cherry picker. Janet and Philip upholster a stool for a new dressing area.	1 September 2022
10	At Château de Lalande, Stephanie aim to have the Marquis Salon completed before guests arrive. Anna and Edward at Château Lagorce need to repair the flood damaged kitchen after a severe rainstorm. Sarah and George trial a new venture with guided antiquing.	2 September 2022
11	Emma and Paul decorate the attic in a WWII style at Château de Montvason. Sarah and Bart are on a mission to find the right château to retire in. Ben and Billie need to finish their garden apartment. Tim and Sasha make a bamboo blessing arch.	5 September 2022
12	Jayne and Steve of Château de Thuriés host a landscape painting course. Chateau shopper Sarah and Bart continue to search for their ideal home. Emma and Paul finish the room decorated in honour of WWII soldiers who stayed there.	6 September 2022
13	Trish enlists the help of her friends to brighten up the dark interior of her 14th-century Château de Gère. Edward and Anna tidy up the overgrown entrance border and create a new border. Sarah and Bart revisit the chateau to decide.	7 September 2022
14	Sarah and George prepare to host a wedding, while Edward works the drain to prevent future flood. Trish builds a fence to protect her solar panels from the sheep.	8 September 2022
15	Julia put the finishing touches to the rooms to host her first ever wedding in the heat. Trish create a patio seating area and a fire pit. Alison and Zion start a major landscaping and gardening project on their rocky ground.	9 September 2022
16	At Château Lagorce, Edward add a covered area to the pool house. Belinda & Lee at Château Mareuil convert an old tool shed into a gîte. Ben and Vanessa aim to transform an old laundry into a cinema and games room at Château de Joli Bois.	12 September 2022
17	Paul and Debbie repair the driveway damaged in a recent storm. Belinda and Lee find the gîte conversion longer than expected. Ben and Vanessa transform an old garage into a new gin bar, recycling oak boards found in the chicken shed. Janet and Philip restore an old bell.	13 September 2022
18	At Château La Briance, Matt and Helen prepare to host their first ever wedding. Belinda and Lee recycle their kitchen units for the two-bed gîte. Ithaca & Alex clean the family silverware in their ancestral home Château Flore. Amy & Marc at Château de Rosières start a crafty project making clay tiles for a splashback.	14 September 2022
19	Belinda and Lee fit a staircase and stained glass window in their gîte. At Château de Seguenville, Becky & Mark start converting an outbuilding into a 4-bedroom gîte. In the Loire Valley, Guy tries his hand at building a flatpack spiral staircase. Stephanie prepares for a costume party.	15 September 2022
20	At Château de Dohem, Wendy & Marcus add a pergola for an outdoor wedding location to expand into the wedding business. Becky and Mark lay a new concrete floor as their new gîte. In the Dordogne, Nick and Nicole remove a kitchen to create a grand entrance hall.	16 September 2022
21	At Chateau du Puits es Pratx in the Languedoc region, Tim creates a bamboo water curtain feature for the garden. Christina & Sassan clean and repair the swimming pool area, while Wendy & Marcus get the chateau ready for a themed birthday party. Sarah and George buy and sell antique fabrics to help with the upkeep of the chateau.	20 September 2022
22	At Château du Doux, Abbie, Ross, Clive and Karen create accessible bedroom and bathroom for disabled guests. Sasha makes a decorative bridal pathway at Chateau du Puits es Pratx. Christina & Sassan continue to work on the pool.	21 September 2022
23	Alison & Zion want to turn nuns' cottages in the ground of Château de la Boutinière into gîtes for paying guests. Christina & Sassan turn the grand salon into a kitchen and dining place for guests. Tim and Sasha host a wedding in the soaring heat of the summer.	22 September 2022
24	Alison and Zion rush to complete their first ever gîte that already has a booking. Edward and Anna face a problem with the bridal party flights being cancelled. Janet and Philip plan a three-bedroom suite with a secret room in the tower, but found a holey problem.	23 September 2022
25	Janet and Philip continue working on their tower suite. Paul and Julia, having just moved into Château Larribau, try to turn it into a liveable shape. At Château de Bourneau in the Loire Valley, Erin and JB turn their attention to the leaky dormer windows.	26 September 2022
26	Ben and Billie want to turn their boatshed into an outdoor kitchen for their glamping site. Tim and Krys crack on with the renovation of their professional kitchen. Erin and JB host a medieval-themed village fete in the ground of the chateau.	27 September 2022
27	Tim install the kitchen unit and decorate the dining room with reliefs to be ready for their first guests in two years. Ben and Billie host a wedding anniversary party at the chateau and open their renovated ballroom. The Cherry family face a delay to their kitchen renovation, while Aaron battles the elements to install the terrace sails.	28 September 2022
28	The Cherry family aim to create a luxury bridal suite with a turret bathroom. Emma and Paul begin to construct a small dam to stop a lake from leaking. Alison and Zion clean the facade of their chateau and start work on the honeymoon suite.	29 September 2022
29	Stephanie and Gerry begin a grand plan to transform the smallest room, while Alison and Zion reconstruct a fireplace in their honeymoon suite. Emma and Paul prepare for their swing and jazz event.	30 September 2022
30	Donna and Paul want to turn the basement into a conference room. New chateau owners Chris and Jolyon have a lot on their hands turning Chateau Trois Cloches near Le Havre into a home and events venue. Jayne and Steve get ready to host their first and last wedding as they will be selling their chateau.	1 October 2022

=== Christmas 2022 ===
Five Christmas-themed episodes were broadcast on Channel 4 commencing on 19 December 2022.

Episode list - Christmas 2022
Number	Description	Initial air date
1		19 December 2022
2		20 December 2022
3		21 December 2022
4		22 December 2022
5		23 December 2022

=== Christmas 2023 ===
Five Christmas-themed episodes were broadcast on Channel 4 commencing on 18 December 2023.

Episode list - Christmas 2023
Number	Description	Initial air date
1		18 December 2023
2		19 December 2023
3		20 December 2023
4		21 December 2023
5		22 December 2023

=== Series 4 ===
Series 4 of Chateau DIY began airing on Channel 4 on 21 January 2024, with thirty episodes broadcast.

Episode list - Series 4
Number	Description	Initial air date
1	At Château la Grande Maison, Ben and Billie want to transform guest bedrooms into their grand suite. Tim and Rebecca work on their family kitchen at Château de la Ruche, while Nick and Nicole start to build a self-contained apartment in the wine cellar at Chateau des Vieilles Vignes in the wintry condition.	22 January 2024
2	Nick and Nicole need to complete a habitable apartment before their baby arrives in a few months. Tim and Rebecca get ready to host their first-ever floristry workshop. Ben and Billie race to renovate their suite before the guests arrive.	23 January 2024
3	At Château de Bourneau, Erin and JB want to turn their corner tower into a grand guest entrance, Ben and Billie prepare to host a special romantic weekend for couples. And Nick and Nicole have the entire facade of the chateau to be sandblasted.	24 January 2024
4	Nick and Nicole have a friend over to help with their renovation. Ben and Billie spruce up their gatehouse so their guests get a good first impression. Erin and JB hurried to get their fix the windows in the tower before the storm arrives.	25 January 2024
5	Nick and Nicole hurry to get their apartment habitable before their baby arrives. Belinda and Lee at Château Mareuil prepare to a three-course charity dinner. Erin and JB put the finishing touches to the tower in Château de Bourneau.	26 January 2024
6	Tim at Château du Puits es Pratx decides to turn a huge wine barrel into a breakfast room, while Sasha creates a Mediterranean garden. At Château de Gère, Trish want to update her kitchen. Andrea and David start their search for a historical home that they can turn into a business.	29 January 2024
7	Tim and Sasha continue with their work on a 180-year-old barrel and the garden. Andrea and David continue their search for a perfect chateau. Trish wants to replace a bridge, but finds it more complicated than she thought.	30 January 2024
8	Tim and Sasha complete hidden dining room in the barrel and decorated it with light. Terry and Ashley at Château de Lalacelle work on the guest suite and garden to bring an abandoned chateau back to life. Belinda and Lee organise a coronation-themed murder mystery evening. Chef Tim	31 January 2024
9	Sarah and George at Château de Brives transform one of the barns into a nightclub and another into a lounge. Terry and Ashley plan to reinstate a formal garden. At Château de La Vigne, May and Guy want to improve their outdoor terrace. Janet and Philip upcycle a mirror at Château de La Fare.	1 February 2024
10	Terry and Ashley remove the roof of the guest suite and repair an outside wall. May and Guy host a yoga retreat on the terrace, while Sarah and George trial a new caterer. Erin and JB create an insect hotel to help encourage biodiversity.	2 February 2024
11	Anna and Edward remove a fig tree growing on terrace wall at Château Lagorce. At Château Trois Cloches, Chris and Jolyon build a pond on their ground. Ben and Billie transform the servants' quarters in the attic.	5 February 2024
12	Chris and Jolyon start working on a room in the east wing. Donna and Paul plan on a highlander-themed suite at Château de Saugé. Ben and Billie freshen up the courtyard. Anna and Edward tackle the not-so-simple task of changing a light bulb.	6 February 2024
13	Donna and Paul organise a love-theme afternoon tea party as their first event of the season. Chris and Jolyon tile the bathroom, while Jane and Rory begin their search for their dream chateau.	7 February 2024
14	Donna and Paul continue their work on the Highlander Suite. Jane and Rory continue their hunt for a home. Chris and Jolyon turn the salon into a guest lounge.	8 February 2024
15	Donna and Paul put the finishing touches to the Highlander Suite before their guests arrive. Chris and Jolyon revive an antique chandelier and complete the grand salon. Jane and Rory have to make a deciion	9 February 2024
16	Alison and Zion at Château de la Boutiniére plan a wedding garden. Tim and Sasha clean the pool and add a new water feature. At Château de Seguenville. Becky and Mark try to install a massive spiral staircase in their gîte.	12 February 2024
17	Alison and Zion and add Moroccan features to the bridal suite. Becky learns to plaster the bathroom and Mark lays the oak flooring. Sasha paints a mural on the cover of the pool while son-in-law Luke creates a games room for guest.	13 February 2024
18	Alison and Zion want to add a steam room to the bathroom. Sarah and George prepare to host their biggest ever wedding in a heatwave. Becky and Mark rush to complete the gîte before guests arrive for an open day.	14 February 2024
19	Alison and Zion found a bee's nest outside the bridal bathroom. Belinda and Lee prepare to host a special family wedding. Donna and Paul try to finish their work on a business conference suite. Chris and Jolyon convert a cupboard into hidden cocktail bar.	15 February 2024
20	Alison and Zion are hard at work trying to finish their Moroccan-themed bridal suite. Stephanie at Chateau de Lalande prepares for a birthday dinner party. Belinda and Lee turn their attention to their own private terrace.	16 February 2024
21	At Domaine de la Barde in the Dordogne, Tim and Krys aim to give character to their guest bedrooms. Jon and Carmen bought the fire-ravaged Chateau de Cezerac and start renovating the kitchen without mains electricity. Julia stage a Mad Hatter tea party at Château Mas du Pradié. Tim and Sasha create a bee hotel for carpenter bees.	19 February 2024
22	Tim and Krys start building a cookery school in an outbuilding. Jon and Carmen explore the chateau to find a dungeon. Chris and Jolyon celebrate their first year as châtelains with a pride party.	20 February 2024
23	In the Lot Valley, Jon and Carmen plan on creating a vineyard, but clear the vines from the tower. Tim and Krys hope to get three guest bedrooms decorated in two months' time. Christina and Sassan want to build a kitchenette by a pool. Alison and Zion create a fox-proof chicken run.	21 February 2024
24	Tim and Krys must get their decorating finished in time for their first ever guests. Tim and Sasha update the decor of the first bedroom they decorated. At Château de Lassalle, the poolside kitchenette of Christina and Sassan is taking shape.	22 February 2024
25	Tim builds an inglenook fireplace to the kitchen while Krys plants the vegetable garden for the cookery school. Tim and Sasha host a wedding but the heavens open just before the wedding is due to start. Christina and Sassan rush to complete their poolside kitchenette before the guests arrive.	23 February 2024
26	Sarah and George organise a village fete the 200th anniversary of the celebrate their chateau. Stephanie decide to refresh one of the bedrooms she first renovated. Trish want to get the pool ready for summer guests but found the job bigger than expected.	26 February 2024
27	Trish struggles to finish the pool decking before guests arrive for a barbecue party. Stephanie install a gazebo in time for her mum's birthday. At Château de La Fare, Janet and Philip have problems with their re-plastering of the vaulted ceiling of the salon.	27 February 2024
28	In Occitania, Janet and Philip plaster-board the ceiling in the tower suite. Anna and Edward have their hands full getting the chateau ready for their next wedding in a tight schedule. At Château du Doux, Clive and Abbie start converting a cottage for Abbie to live in.	28 February 2024
29	Sasha plans to revive a convertible sports car, but Tim suffers a fall just before a wedding. Janet and Philip repurpose an old cupboard for the tower bedroom. In Dordogne, Clive fixes a roof with the flagstone tiles and installs a septic tank.	29 February 2024
30	Janet and Philip tries to finish the suite in the tower for guests who are arriving. In the Charente-Maritime, Bart and Sarah, who bought La Grande Maison La Pinelle, moves into a side building while they renovate their chateau. Clive and Ross finishes a gardener cottage to Abbie to live in on site, while Abbie upcycles a kitchen.	1 March 2024

=== Christmas 2024 series ===
Five Christmas-themed episodes were broadcast on Channel 4 commencing on 16 December 2024.

Episode list - Christmas 2024
Number	Description	Initial air date
1		16 December 2024
2		17 December 2024
3		18 December 2024
4		19 December 2024
5		20 December 2024

=== Series 5 ===
Series 5 of Chateau DIY began airing on Channel 4 on 31 March 2025, with thirty episodes broadcast.

Episode list - Series 5
Number	Description	Initial air date
1	Erin & JB of Château de Bourneau want to create an arts and craft studio at the top of the central tower. At Chateau de Cézérac, Jon and Carmen want to redesign the bathroom before they can move in. Donna and Paul have sold Château de Saugé and bought Moulin du Couesnon, a dilapidated water mill in Brittany, to turn it into their new home.	31 March 2025
2	At Château des Vieilles Vignes, Nick and Nicole begin work on their chateau to create new living spaces for their growing family. Donna and Paul need to complete the work on the gîte so they can move in in two months. Erin and JB try to complete their turret art room before their neighbours come to open the room.	1 April 2025
3	Alison & Zion prepare for their first wedding in 3 month's time by sprucing up the facade of Château de la Boutiniére. New chateau owners Tim and Sharon decide to redecorate the tower bathroom suite at Château de la Grillère. At Château de Lalacelle, Terry and Ashley rush to finish their guest suite before their first guest arrive.	2 April 2025
4	At Château du Puits Es Pratx Tim and Sasha extend the existing bar and turn a wine barrel into a walk-in wine store. New chateau family the Hutsons bring the hallway of Chateau de Bruges back to life in time for a family party. In Charente, Bart and Sarah of La Grande Maison La Pinelle tackle a damp problem.	3 April 2025
5	Tim and Sasha continue to work on the bar renovation and the wine barrel. Trish prepares to host her first event for paying guest at Château de Gère. At Château Domaine De Le Barde, chef Tim creates an outdoor barbecue.	4 April 2025
6	Janet and Philip plan to transform three rooms into a grand tower suite at Château de La Fare. Tim and Krys need to finish their outdoor BBQ area for their guests. Chris and Jolyon work to transform the dining room at Chateau Trois Cloches.	7 April 2025
7	Ben and Billie renovate their hallway and stairs at Château La Grande Maison in time for the first event of the new season. Donna and Paul put a new roof on at the mill. Chris and Jolyon complete decorating their maritime-themed dining room.	8 April 2025
8	Nick and Nicole create a Narnia-inspired secret doorway with two wardrobes. Lucy and Tim start their search for a perfect chateau. Ben and Billie put the finishing touches to the hallway and stairs and host a romantic evening for their guests.	9 April 2025
9	Ben and Vanessa at Château de Joli Bois add theatrical painted panels to the ballroom ceiling. Chef Tim gets some chickens for a regular supply of fresh eggs for his kitchen. Lucy and Tim have to decide which chateau they want as their home.	10 April 2025
10	Jon and Carmen convert their kitchen into a medieval dining room. Alison and Zion continue with sprucing up their chateau's exterior Paul and Debbie of Château de Cadres want to renovate the stairwell, starting with the ceiling.	11 April 2025
11	Nick and Nicole renovate the kitchen of what will be their new living quarters. Paul and Debbie continue their work on the tower stairwell before their guests arrive. Ben and Billie try to rescue a 50-year-old vinegar barrel.	14 April 2025
12	Trish gets a bedroom ready for her guests. Tim and Sasha repair and extend their front steps into a feature for their wedding guests. Nick and Nicole work on their new kitchen and dining room before their son's first birthday party.	15 April 2025
13	Belinda and Lee at Château Mareuil need to fix a leaking roof on the watchtower before it is ready for a wedding party. Stephanie and Phillip redecorates the kitchen corridor of her home. Jane and Rory move into their new home, Château de Pican.	16 April 2025
14	Tim and Krys create a sun terrace beside their pool. Donna and Paul install a large new window but make an error in measurement. Lee tidy the garden with an injured foot as the first wedding of the season are due. Tim and Sasha install panels of stained glass.	17 April 2025
15	Janet and Philip create a kitchen dining room for the tower suite. Krys and Tim lay the stone slabs and put the finishing touches to the pool renovation. Terry and Ashley take out the floorboards to put in a fireplace.	18 April 2025
16	Alison and Zion have many tasks to finish before their wedding guests arrive in three weeks' time. Anna and Edward at Château Lagorce diversify into event weekend of wine tasting, gourmet dining and antiquing. Janet and Philip need to restore the rotten kitchen balcony door.	21 April 2025
17	Donna and Paul add a ceiling to reduce the height of a room in the gîte. John and Carmen want to create a toilet in the fire-damaged stairwell. Alison and Zion try to finish a long to-do list before the first wedding at the chateau.	22 April 2025
18	Sharon and Tim prepare the ground to install a 10-metre swimming pool. Ben and Billie aim to transform the apartment lobby into a lounge. Jane and Rory in their new chateau start working on the bathroom in the roof terrace suite.	23 April 2025
19	Chris and Jolyon rush to finish their renovation of a guest room in time for their friend's birthday party. Paul and Debbie try to fit a shower room into a round turret room. Sharon and Tim encounter problems installing the pool.	24 April 2025
20	Julia and Paul redecorate the entrance lobby of Château Larribau. The Hutsons trim a massive tree that's too close to both the chateau and the greenhouse. Tim and Krys' attempt to revamp their abandoned orangery into an event space for guests, but rain causes flooding.	25 April 2025
21	Tim and Krys need to finish the event space in their orangery. Mark and Becky convert a disused room into a boot room and toilet to their home Château de Seguenville. Brothers Richard and Will begin their hunt for a chateau suitable as a shared house for two families.	28 April 2025
22	Terry and Ashley insulate the ceiling entire chateau but found rotten beams above the window. Richard and Will continue their search for the right chateau. Donna and Paul try to complete the kitchen and living room of the gîte	29 April 2025
23	After installing the pool, Sharon and Tim plan a large pool house. Jon and Carmen restore a smoke-damaged guest suite. Stephanie and Philip plan their engagement party.	30 April 2025
24	Nick and Nicole are finishing the kitchen and get the plumbing and electricity installed. Tim and Sasha create a pathway and a stump garden for happy couples to enjoy on their wedding day. Debbie and Dave clear out their new home, Château Chomet, before moving in the gîte.	1 May 2025
25	Anna and Edward hold their 400th wedding at the chateau. Tim and Sasha decide to add a romantic bamboo bench. Terry and Ashley continue with their transformation of their guest suite.	2 May 2025
26	Janet and Philip aim to finish the tower suite for their family arriving from Australia. The Huston family want to restore an ornate fountain that hasn't worked for forty years. Chris and Jolyon have to renovate 40 original shutters.	5 May 2025
27	Jon and Carmen start to clean the neglected swimming pool, beginning by removing the frogs. Ben and Vanessa want to convert the laundry into an escape with a gym, cinema room, spa and sauna. And Tim and Krys prepare to host a book launch in the orangery.	6 May 2025
28	At Château de Lassalle, Christina & Sassan hope to turn a storage room into a grand library. Tim and Sasha try to create a floral chandelier with a confetti drop for a wedding. And Jon and Carmen want to complete their swimming pool renovation.	7 May 2025
29	Terry and Ashley plan to restore the formal garden at the chateau. Nick and Nicola are finishing the rooms in the chateau to move into after two years of work. At Château de la Ruche, Tim and Rebecca prepare the cutting garden to grow flowers to decorate the rooms in the chateau.	8 May 2025
30	Terry and Ashley try to get the formal garden at Château de Lalacelle ready in time for the local mayor to visit at an open house event. Sharon and Tim refurbish a bedroom. And Jon and Carmen create a gin house in a dilapidated tree house.	9 May 2025

=== Christmas 2025 ===
Episode list - Christmas 2025
Number	Description	Initial air date
1		15 December 2025
2		16 December 2025
3		17 December 2025
4		18 December 2025
5		19 December 2025

== Featured châteaux and owners ==
- Abbaye de la Bussière (Clive & Tanith Cummings)
- Château Caillac (Angela & Stephen Hall)
- Château Chomet (Debbie and Dave)
- Château de Bois Giraud (Tanya Field, Marian Parker & Katharine Parker)
- Château de Bourneau (Erin Choa & Jean-Baptiste Gois)
- Château de Brametourte (Paul & Alison)
- Chateau de Bruges (Graham Hutson and family)
- Château de Brives (George & Sarah Haslett)
- Château de Cadres (Debbie Cherry, Paul, Aaron, Harriet & Hannah)
- Chateau de Cézérac (Jon and Carmen Parker)
- Château de Dohem (Wendy & Marcus)
- Château de Gère (Trish)
- Château de Jalesnes (Jonathan Cooke & Michael Halpin)
- Château de Joli Bois (Ben & Vanessa Leech)
- Château de la Basmaignée (Gwendoline & Billy Petherick)
- Château de la Boutiniére (Alison & Zion)
- Château de La Fare (Philip & Janet Barnard-Brown)
- Château de la Grillère (Tim and Sharon)
- Château de la Motte-Husson (Dick Strawbridge & Angel Adoree)
- Château de La Ruche (Tim & Rebecca Jones)
- Château de La Vigne (May & Guy)
- Château de Lalacelle (Terry Short and Ashley Waters)
- Château de Lalande (Stephanie Jarvis)
- Château de Lassalle (Christina & Sassan Aminzadeh)
- Château de Lomenie (Ashley Adams & Johnny Darko)
- Château de Montvason (Emma & Paul Golledge)
- Château de Pican (Jane and Rory)
- Château de Rosières (Amy & Marc)
- Château de Saugé and Moulin du Couesnon (Donna & Paul)
- Château de Seguenville (Becky & Mark)
- Château de Saint-Ferriol (Sophie Duncan and James McDonald)
- Château de Thuriés (Jayne & Steve Simmonds)
- Château des Lys (Tim & Margreeth Alexander)
- Château des Vieilles Vignes (Nick and Nicole)
- Château d'Humières / Château de Lucheux (Nicole Albert & Stephan Botte)
- Château du Bailleul (Philip & Angelina Baillie-Smith)
- Château du Doux, Limousin (Abbie, Ross, Karen & Clive Young)
- Château du Masgelier (Fiona Jones)
- Château du Puits es Pratx (Tim and Sasha)
- Château Flore (Ithaca & Alexandre de Boncourt)
- Château Gioux (Debbie Bell & Nigel Lawson)
- Château Le Fleur (Anna & Philipp Mayrhofer)
- Château La Briance (Matt & Helen)
- Château La Grande Maison (Ben & Billie Mitchell)
- Château La Perriere (Paul & Karen Horne)
- Château Lagorce (Edward & Anna Holmes)
- Château Larribau (Julia & Paul)
- Château Les Bernards (Simon & Debbie)
- Château Madame (Steve Mack)
- Château Mareuil (Belinda & Lee Prince)
- Château Mas du Pradié (Julia Fulford-Kirby)
- Château Monteil / Domaine de la Barde (Tim & Krys Birch)
- Domaine de la Salle (Mariam & Jono)
- Chateau Trois Cloches (Chris Smith & Jolyon Latchmore)
- Grande Maison La Pinelle (Bart and Sarah)
- Le Vieux Château (Brian & Donna McDougall)

== Adaptation ==
In October 2024, it was announced an Australian version of the series will be commissioned by Nine Network in 2025. The five episode series will be produced by Spark Media Partners for the 9Network in association with Cineflix Rights. Two years after its announcement, the series will comprise of 5 episodes and will air on 2 October 2026.
