= Escape to the Chateau =

British television reality series

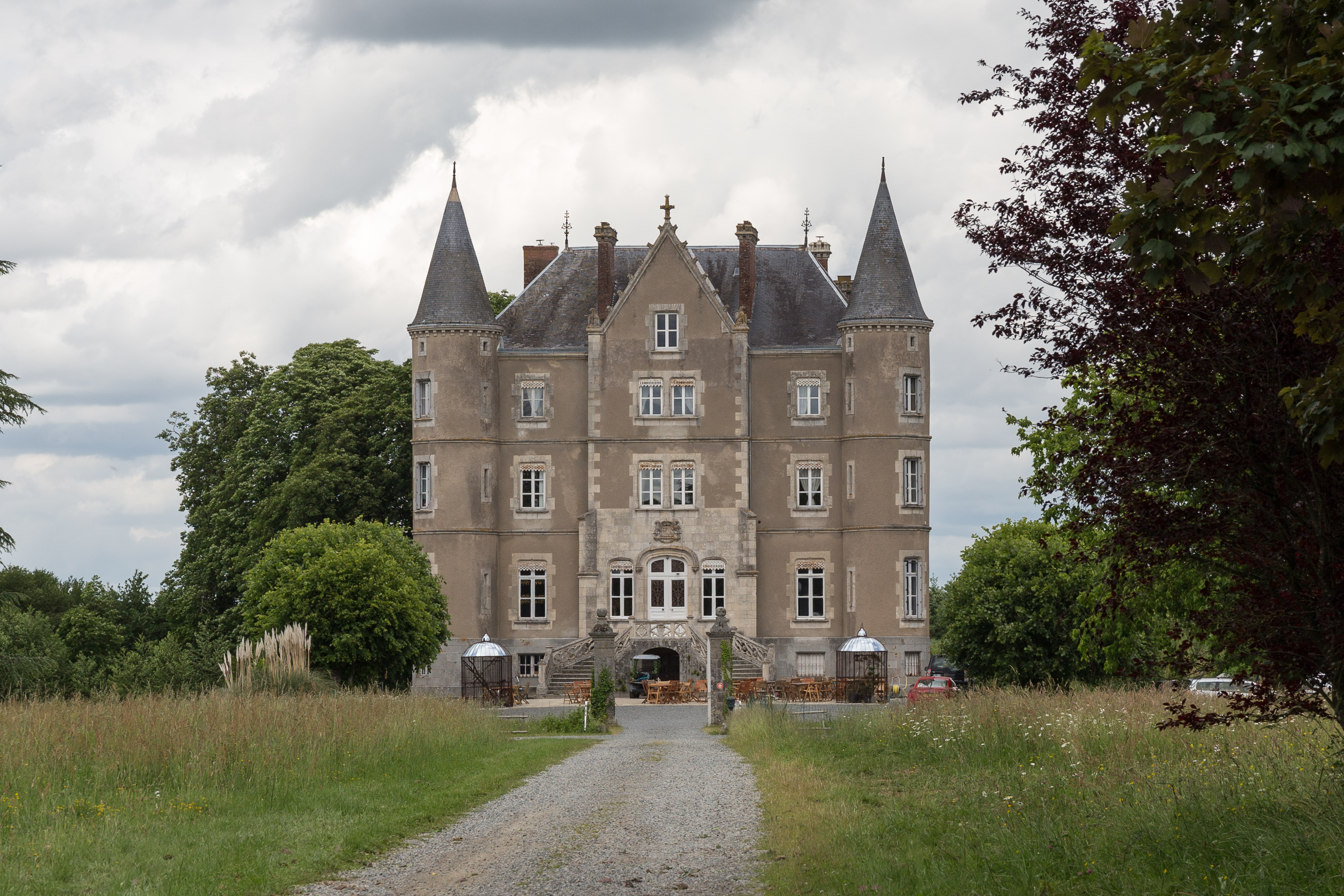
- Château de la Motte-Husson in June 2019
- Genre: Reality television
- Narrated by: Tracy-Ann Oberman
- Country of origin: United Kingdom
- Original language: English
- No. of seasons: 10
- No. of episodes: 54 (list of episodes)

Production
- Production location: France
- Running time: 47 minutes
- Production companies: Spark Media Partners; Kindling Media

Original release
- Network: Channel 4
- Release: 5 June 2016 – present

Related
- Chateau DIY

Escape to the Chateau is a Channel 4 reality television series, which follows the story of couple Dick Strawbridge and Angela ("Angel") Adoree and their family as they bought and renovated the 19th-century Château de la Motte-Husson, in Martigné-sur-Mayenne, France, while simultaneously raising two young children and starting a business hosting weddings and other events.

The first season followed Dick and Angel's quest to restore the derelict château from its uninhabitable state by installing running water, heating and electricity in the 45-room château, which had not been lived in for forty years. The later seasons of the program continued the story as they established their special events business, at the same time as renovating the château and its grounds. It also documented family events and milestones.

Ten series of the programme have been produced. Initially, series nine was described as the final season. However in October 2025, a tenth series was announced, with the first episode airing 31 May 2026.

Following the completion of series 9 of Escape to the Chateau, Dick and Angel Strawbridge launched a weekly podcast titled Dick & Angel’s CHAT…EAU. The first episode launched on Global Player and other major podcast platforms on 1 November 2023, and is titled 112 Steps, 2 Turrets & 1 Tip. It involved the couple looking back at how they found their chateau and knew that it was "the one".

== Cast information ==
=== Dick Strawbridge ===
Formerly a Lieutenant Colonel in the British Army, engineer Dick Strawbridge appeared on numerous television shows, including It's Not Easy Being Green (2006), Coast (2006), Scrapheap Challenge (2009), The Hungry Sailors (2011), Saturday Farm (2011) and Dirty Rotten Survival (2015). In Escape to the Chateau, his engineering and cooking experience is highlighted, with his can-do attitude and mechanical expertise at the fore, as work on the château and its surrounding land continues through the seasons.

=== Angela ("Angel") Adoree ===
Adoree was born 7 April 1978 as Angela Newman and grew up on Canvey Island, where her family ran a jewellers' shop. She runs a hospitality business called The Vintage Patisserie, for which she sought investment when she appeared on the reality television business programme, Dragon's Den, in 2010. In 2015, the business relocated to Chateau-de-la-Motte Husson.

Adoree provided a creative factor and flair for the show, adding her style and interior-decoration skill to the château renovation, as well as sharing her interest in hospitality and entertaining.

The couple has two children, Arthur and Dorothy.

== Episode list ==
=== Series 1 ===
Episode List
Season	Number	Overall Number	Title	Description	Initial Air Date
1	1	1	Hole in the Wall	After years of searching we found our forever home, the derelict 19th century Chateau de la Motte Husson. Complete with a moat, pepper-pot turrets, and 200 pages of purchase documentation listing why not to buy The Chateau. This truly was 'The Beginning'!	5 June 2016
1	2	2	They're Our Flies	It was time for us to move into The Chateau and the transformation of bringing life back into those substantial walls began. We have a wedding to plan and a Chateau to renovate all in 9 months which we quickly realized is not really that long away at all!	12 June 2016
1	3	3	Angel's Palace of Dreams	Walls are being knocked through and turrets transformed into museums. Dinner is served in our new downstairs kitchen and the kids have a new helter skelter to explore.	19 June 2016
1	4	4	A Pineapple Chandelier, a Moat & a Wedding	Our wedding is drawing ever closer and we are determined to renovate nearly 3 floors of The Chateau into beautiful rooms before our big day.	26 June 2016

=== Series 2 ===
Episode List
Season	Number	Overall Number	Title	Description	Initial Air Date
2	1	5	Pig Roaster and Versailles Loo	The couple begins to grow their events business at the chateau. Dick prepares for their first paid event by making a DIY pig-roaster. Family life also expands with their three-year-old son Arthur’s first day at school. Angel creates a Versailles-inspired downstairs toilet.	27 November 2016
2	2	6	Fishing, Foraging and an Elevator	Dick and Angel want to enhance their money-making prospects with the possibility of fishing in the moat and installing a lift in the turret.	4 December 2016
2	3	7	Christmas at the Chateau	Christmas is coming. Angel prepares the Christmas festivities and Dick prepares the food, in time for the family coming from England.	11 December 2016

=== Series 3 ===
Episode List
Season	Number	Overall Number	Title	Description	Initial Air Date
3	1	8	Only 20 Rooms to Go	Angel and Dick keep working on the 20 rooms that still need fixing.	24 September 2017
3	2	9	Spring	Dick tries to tackle his walled garden. Angel creates a boudoir in the castle. Guests propose during a food event.	1 October 2017
3	3	10	The Wedding Season	The wedding season is approaching, so Dick needs to clean out and prepare the barn for the events.	8 October 2017

=== Series 4 ===
Episode List
Season	Number	Overall Number	Title	Description	Initial Air Date
4	1	11	Weddings, Stables & Staircases	A busy summer with seven weddings and 14 food-lovers' weekends to prepare, as well as fixing the stables and gardens.	18 March 2018
4	2	12	Harvest and Birthday	Angel plans for a floating geodesic dome over the moat. They celebrate Dick’s birthday.	25 March 2018
4	3	13	A Floating Dome	Dick tackles the chateau's crumbling stucco while Angel finishes the geodesic dome over the moat. The family use it well with a campout under the stars.	1 April 2018

=== Series 5 ===
Episode List
Season	Number	Overall Number	Title	Description	Initial Air Date
5	1	14	Glamping	Dick and Angel throw open the shutters of their French chateau for a new season, as they work to create a luxury glamping experience and contend with frequent rainshowers.	11 November 2018
5	2	15	In the Attic	Angel plans a stunning attic studio. She and Dorothy go on a mother-daughter trip to Paris and Dick's busy in the outbuildings. There's a surprise birthday event - with popcorn.	18 November 2018
5	3	16	Parkour & Turret	Angel creates a series of rooms in the chateau's pepper-pot turret. Dick opens up a parkour fitness trail in the grounds, but he hits an unexpected snag.	25 November 2018
5	4	17	Peak Summer	It's the height of summer and the heat is on for Dick and Angel, with the peak of the events season, wedding cakes melting, school holidays, a boating lake, and a leaky boat.	2 December 2018
5	5	18	Cafe Grandma	Before winter sets in, Dick ploughs the wildflower meadow and joins with Angel in bringing the dilapidated coach house back to life, in a bid to create 'Cafe Grandma'.	9 December 2018
5	6	19	Harvest Time	It's harvest time at the chateau. But there's still time for family wheelbarrow races, to give the basement a swish makeover, and to convert the old piggery into a coop for geese.	16 December 2018
5	7	20	... at Christmas	Dick and Angel are preparing for a magical Christmas at the chateau, with festive treats for family and friends, including Dick's walnut wine and a super-sized Christmas tree.	23 December 2018

=== Series 6 ===
Episode List
Season	Number	Overall Number	Title	Description	Initial Air Date
6	1	21	Winter Returns	The 'down' season gives Dick and Angel time to construct an events kitchen from utility area and some dumping areas in the basement. One of the challenges: inserting an enormous oven.	3 November 2019
6	2	22	A Boat in the Moat	Angel has bought a small canal boat that needs repair because it currently doesn't float. She also records some ancient wallpaper found under the stairs in the basement. Dick needs to finish the wild flower meadow.	10 November 2019
6	3	23	Weddings & Aviaries	A circus tent arrives although it is the wedding season. Dick and Angel now have two giant aviaries and a water lily pond.	17 November 2019
6	4	24	The Party of a Lifetime	In the heat of the French summer, if they didn't have enough to do, Dick and Angel are planning the party of a lifetime: 100 guests to celebrate Angel's parents' 50th wedding anniversary. Meanwhile, Dick travels to Wales to fetch a new vehicle.	24 November 2019
6	5	25	Camper Van	An end of summer event is due with a host of Citroën vans. Whilst Dick and Angel are preparing their latest acquisition - an ex-wedding bus they call 'Mademoiselle Daisy'.	1 December 2019
6	6	26	Autumn Renovation	Dick and Angel turn the chateau's old tack room into a grand entrance; they need to demolish walls and lay a new floor.	8 December 2019
6	7	27	Riverboat	Dick and Angel embark on a new project: converting their newly-acquired riverboat into guest accommodation.	15 December 2019
6	8	28	Escape to the Chateau at Christmas	Christmas comes again to the chateau with more Christmas crafts and fare; and with family, friends, and guests.	22 December 2019

=== Series 7 ===
Series 7 takes place during lockdown in France due to the COVID-19 pandemic and there are no weddings or events at the Chateau.

Episode List
Season	Number	Overall Number	Title	Description	Initial Air Date
7	1	29	Supersized Workshop	It's been a long, hot, challenging summer and with no guests, weddings or events at the chateau, Dick and Angel tackle their never-ending to-do list, starting with one of the old outbuildings.	15 November 2020
7	2	30	Sloe Gin, Library & Ceiling Rose	Dick is determined to make sloe gin with the last of the berries. Angel gets to work creating a library in the pepper pot tower and brings a ceiling rose back to its former glory.	22 November 2020
7	3	31	Wash House, Trench & Vintage Bike	Dick and Angel start work on turning the old wash house into a bathroom for their boat on the moat. Angel's imagination runs wild when they discover a huge trench. And a vintage bike gets a refurb.	29 November 2020
7	4	32	Orangery, Daybeds & Unexpected History	With no guests to entertain, Dick and Angel get to work on the orangery with the help of a roofing expert and some pre-loved Welsh slate, and discover some unexpected history beneath their feet.	6 December 2020
7	5	33	Pop-Up Restaurant, Orangery, Celebration	The whole family help to build an open kitchen and create a pop-up restaurant in the orangery to celebrate Dick and Angel's fifth wedding anniversary. Plus: a special fairy-tale carriage delivery.	13 December 2020
7	6	34	Escape to the Chateau at Christmas	In this festive special, the Strawbridges take inspiration from Christmases past in a 19th-century ledger that they find in the attic, and create a winter wonderland complete with an ice rink.	25 December 2020

=== Series 8 ===
Episode List
Season	Number	Overall Number	Title	Description	Initial Air Date
8	1	35	Gardening and the Coach House	Dick, Angel, Arthur and Dorothy share more enchanting tales from the Chateau, as they continue the renovation of their 19th-century fairytale home and grounds. With weddings and events on hold for the second year, Dick and Angel bite the bullet and make the big decision to tackle the exterior of the Chateau. The roof and outside walls are their biggest project to date and the Chateau quickly becomes a building site.	24 October 2021
8	2	36	Chateau Roof and the ...	Dick and Angel start work on the biggest, messiest and most expensive job they've ever done at the Chateau - repairing, re-tiling and re-insulating the whole of the original roof. They also transform the preserves cupboard and go hunting in the walled garden for ingredients to make home-grown mint tea and rainbow sweetcorn relish.	31 October 2021
8	3	37	Great British Garden Party	Dick and Angel throw a garden party for Arthur and Dorothy's friends, with traditional games including handmade giant dominoes and a treasure hunt around the Chateau grounds. Angela makes a layered jelly with ice cream and another of her specialities - rose petal and honey sandwiches. Meanwhile, the scaffolding arrives and work can start on re-slating the Chateau roof for the first time in 150 years.	7 November 2021
8	4	38	Storage & Memory...	Arthur and Dorothy are now seven and eight, and growing up fast. They will soon need separate bedrooms - so Angel comes up with an ingenious plan to create a mezzanine. As the re-slating of the roof continues, Dick and Angel not only launch into knocking down walls and building new ones but preserving old wallpaper, creating memory furnishings from the kids' old clothes, as well as finding time to pick some strawberries in the garden.	14 November 2021
8	5	39	Attic & a Celestial-Inspired Sky Bar	Angel discovers that the chateau has a vast attic space running the length of the building and rising to the ridge of the roof. While Dick is glad to have some more storage space, Angel has bigger plans - transforming it into a space-inspired bar complete with balconies from which they can watch the stars. The project will require skylights, a new staircase and unique use of insulation - but proves worth it when a cloudless night provides the perfect chance to look for shooting stars.	28 November 2021
8	6	40	Colour Boards, Rendering and Gadage	Angel sets about restoring the Chateau's walls to their original glory using computer mock-ups to try to match the existing colour. Part of a traditional device used for making cider is discovered while clearing out the piggery, so the hunt is soon on to locate the rest of it. Inspired by the ancient piece of machinery, the family collects apples to make their very own juice.	5 December 2021
8	7	41	Chateau Roof, Front Door & Balustrade	The wooden double front door with its delicate metal tracery, the metal awnings over the windows, and the stone balustrade edging the front steps, are all in a state of disrepair. Angel's father, a former jeweller, steps in to try to make a copy of the huge 150-year-old key to the front door. The family goes to the beach to collect razor clams.	12 December 2021
8	8	42	Escape to the Chateau at Christmas	The Strawbridges visit the Alsace region of France, where they sample local delicacies. Once they're back at the chateau, they create a magical Christmas inspired by their trip.	19 December 2021

=== Series 9 ===
It’s ‘The Year of Celebrations’! Dick & Angel return for their ninth and final series.

Episode List
Season	Number	Overall Number	Title	Description	Initial Air Date
9	1	43	Atelier de Mariage	After two years of closure, the chateau is back open for business and making up for lost time, as Dick and Angel prepare for wedding season and the 'Atelier de Mariage' starts to take shape	30 October 2022
9	2	44	Natasha and Victoria's Big Wedding	The chateau gets ready for its first wedding in over two years, as Dick and Arthur prep a seven-course wedding breakfast, and Angel and Dorothy create dried-petal confetti cones	6 November 2022
9	3	45	19th-Century Folly Retreat	In the spring, the family turn their attention to the beloved walled garden. On the north-facing wall, there is something rather special hidden beneath the ivy that they would like to tackle; a 19th-century folly in need of renovation. Before Angel can transform the interior, Dick has to tackle the overgrown bamboo forest.	13 November 2022
9	4	46	Summer Kitchen	The summer's drought and high temperatures have left the moat's water level lower than ever, and the family work together to save the fish. Over in the walled garden, the recent transformation of the folly has opened Dick and Angel's eyes to the potential of the area around it. They want to enhance the space by creating a new outdoor entertaining area.	20 November 2022
9	5	47	Bling Birthday Party	After eight long years, the peach tree in the walled garden is finally fruiting, and Dick, Angel, Arthur, and Dorothy can't wait to try the very first peach ever grown by the Strawbridge family. Dick and Angel will also soon be hosting a very important 50th birthday party for one of their closest friends, Sophie, without whom they would never have met.	27 November 2022
9	6	48	Games Room and Hidden Treasure	Dick and Angel visit one of the last unexplored areas of the attic. Among the dust and cobwebs, they uncover more of the chateau's unexpected treasures, including an old train set. With the children growing up fast, Dick and Angel want to create a place for them to call their own - a room filled with vintage games as well as new ones. Dick and Angel have bought a classic Renault 4CV dating back to the 1950s that's in need of restoration.	4 December 2022
9	7	49	Episode 7	Dick and Angel create a conservatory-style winter garden room. Meanwhile, the chateau is busy hosting its biggest wedding ever, so there is also lots of organisation to do. Dick and Angel organise a huge Christmas party for all their family and friends, and it's time to sort out the invites - which involve fudge, sparkles and a tin can.	11 December 2022
9	8	50	Escape to the Chateau at Christmas	The Strawbridges conclude their journey with a retrospective, using as a backdrop a bumper 'outdoor' extended family Christmas feast.	18 December 2022

=== Series 10 ===
Episode List
Season	Number	Overall Number	Title	Description	Initial Air Date
10	1	51	The Strawbridge Suite Swap	Dorothy designs a bedroom, Dick and Angel move into the Honeymoon Suite.	31 May 2026
10	2	52	Its Getting Hot in Here	The Chateau gets a new pool and updated honeymoon suite.	07 June 2026
10	3	53	The Chateau's Newest Guests	Dick and Angel host indulgent feasts.	20 June 2026
10	4	54	Autumnal Adventures	Arthur transforms his bedroom. The race is on to finish the pool before winter.	28 June 2026

=== Variant series ===
A second version of series 1 was shown on More 4.

- Episode 1 is called "Hole in the Wall" (26 June 2016).
- Episode 2 is called "They're our Flies" (3 July 2016).
- Episode 3 is called "Angel's Palace of Dreams" (10 July 2016).

More 4 has shown these additional episodes as "an extended four-part version of series one". These are described as follows:

- "S1 Ep1/4 - Dick Strawbridge and Angel buy a fairy tale French chateau and set about bringing the abandoned building back to life",
- "S1 Ep2/4 - Dick, Angel and the family move into their crumbling chateau, which they find home to bats, birds and thousands of flies",
- "S1 Ep3/4 - Wanting to create a stunning honeymoon suite, Angel asks Dick to smash a hole in the three-feet-thick castle wall", and
- "S1 Ep3/3 [sic] - Dick and Angel are due to marry in just a few weeks, expecting 200 guests. But room after room still needs to be restored, decorated and furnished, and the moat needs damming."

Episode 4 of the More 4 series seems to be the third episode of the original three-part Channel 4 series.

=== Retrospective series ===
An additional three episode retrospective series began showing in late 2019. These are:

- Episode 1 is called "Escape to the Chateau : Restoring the Dream" (26 November 2019).
- Episode 2 is called "Escape to the Chateau : Designing the Dream" (2 December 2019).
- Episode 3 is called "Escape to the Chateau : The Great Outdoors" (9 December 2019).

These covered events during the first five years.

== Background and production ==
Dick Strawbridge and Angel Adoree invited production company Spark Media to film them documenting their journey in searching for a house. The couple had already spent four years searching for a home to bring up their two young children, Arthur and Dorothy. The producers took the idea to all major broadcasters but were repeatedly rejected. Eventually Channel 4 agreed to a 3 part series to test the water. It was an instant hit with viewers. In contrast to many other home shows, the television coverage was never planned, but Channel 4 paid to document the couple's journey, which defrayed some of the expense of such a large task. The assistance was in the form of the presenter's fee, in addition to the exposure from the show's advertising, which allowed the business to build its popularity as a wedding and events venue.

The appeal of the show might have been due to the apparent affordability and lack of demand for such French properties, which has attracted many British house buyers. That was the same story with Dick and Angel. When they first started house hunting in France, they were looking at more modest properties, such as small farmhouses, until they realised that at the prevailing low prices, they could buy a castle.

In 2015, for £280,000 (equivalent to £386,777 in 2025), they purchased a chateau, on a 12-acre (4.9-hectare) property, that listed forty-five rooms, seven outbuildings and a walled garden, and was surrounded by a moat, ten times larger than the average British house. Despite the apparent advantages, however, the show made viewers aware of the extent of the restoration and the running costs of such projects, which can become a problem for people trying to make a business out of such ventures, as well as the significant personal effort required.

=== American broadcast ===
Escape to the Chateau premiered in the United States on local PBS stations.

On 5 December 2020, episodes started to air on HGTV. The first one-hour episode of the series was titled "Meet the Chateau", which featured Dick and Angel purchasing the property, including the walled garden, moving in, and then installing electricity and a heating system.

=== History of Château de la Motte-Husson ===
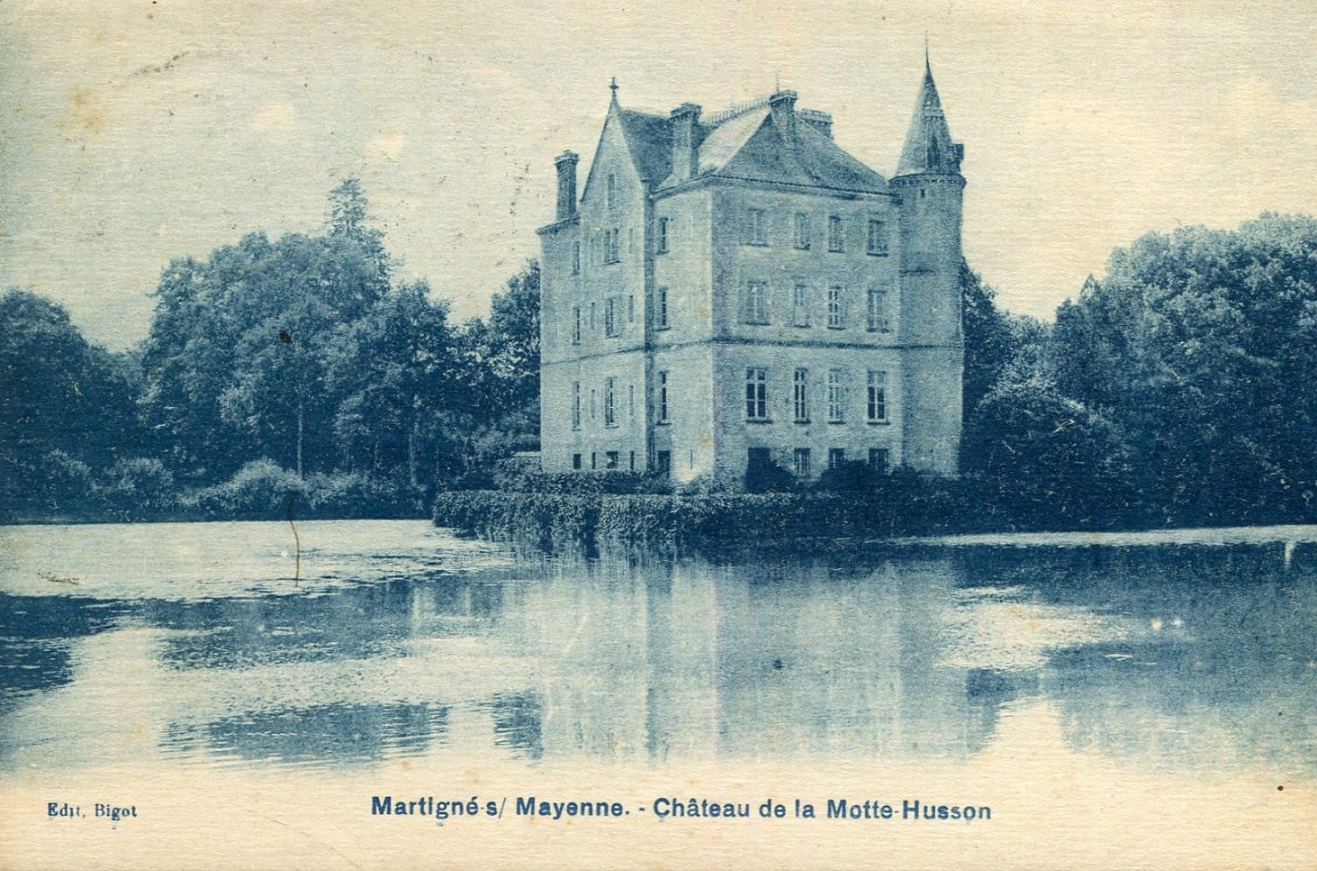
Château de la Motte-Husson (1910).

From the 12th to 14th centuries, the site of the Chateau was used as a fortified stronghold in the parish of La Motte. In 1406, the Husson family, seigneurs of Montgiroux, named the castle Château de la Motte-Husson.

The Baglion de la Dufferie family (a French branch of the Baglioni family of Perugia) acquired the estate in 1600. After that, it was rebuilt within the square moat during the period from 1868 to 1874. The current façade is reflective of the efforts of Countess Louise-Dorothée de Baglion de la Dufferie (1826–1902), who told her husband that she wanted a grand residence. The chateau served as a summer home for the family.

== Related series ==
=== Escape to the Chateau DIY ===
Escape to the Chateau DIY involves Dick and Angel giving their tips to other expatriates in France, who are trying to run businesses from châteaux in conditions similar to their own. The series documents various renovations and looks at possibilities for generating profit. The show was planned to have four series. The initial broadcast was on 9 April 2018, and the third series concluded on 15 November 2019. The fourth series commenced broadcasting on 24 March 2020.
