= Strawbridge =

Strawbridge may refer to:

- Strawbridge (surname)
- Strawbridge, Wisconsin, an unincorporated community in Wisconsin, United States
- Strawbridge's (formerly Strawbridge & Clothier), United States store

== See also ==
- Strawbridge v. Curtiss, court case
