= Strawbridge (surname) =

Strawbridge is a surname. Notable people with the surname include:

- George W. Strawbridge Jr. (born 1937) American educator, historian, investor, sportsman, and philanthropist
- Dick Strawbridge (born 1959), British engineer and television presenter
- Robert Strawbridge (died 1781), Irish Methodist preacher
- Charlotte Strawbridge, British singer-songwriter
- James Dale Strawbridge (1824–1890) American Republican member of the U.S. House of Representatives from Pennsylvania
