= Merit (TV channel) =

British TV channel

- Country: United Kingdom

Programming
- Language: English
- Picture format: 16:9 SDTV

Ownership
- Owner: ITV plc (July–August 2020); Sky Group (August–September 2020)

History
- Launched: 29 July 2020
- Closed: 17 September 2020 (49 days)
- Replaced by: Sky Arts (Freeview)

Merit was a short-lived time-shared British lifestyle and entertainment TV channel which was a part of the Freeview lineup in the late summer of 2020.

== Broadcasting ==
The channel began broadcasting at 9pm on 29 July 2020, its launch delayed from the earlier date of 8 July; under its first iteration it was operated by the ITV Digital Channels division of ITV plc. It broadcast three hours daily from 9pm to midnight on the former ITV3 +1 Freeview channel slot (which itself was moved to channel 58). During ITV Digital Channels' control of the channel, it ran no advertisements.

The channel's licence was acquired by Sky UK Limited on 20 August 2020. On 17 September 2020, the channel's Freeview slot (34) was taken over by Pick, which moved to accommodate the launch of Sky Arts on channel 11, and Merit consequently ceased transmission that day at midnight.

== Programming ==
The channel didn't broadcast original programming, with the content shown being archival or imported programming from its respective licence holders. Programming from Sky included Four Weddings and the American and New Zealand versions of My Kitchen Rules, while ITV's contributions included The Hungry Sailors and Britain's Best Back Gardens.
