= Château Lagorce =

Former castle and château in Haux, France

Coordinates: 44°43′15″N 0°22′26″W

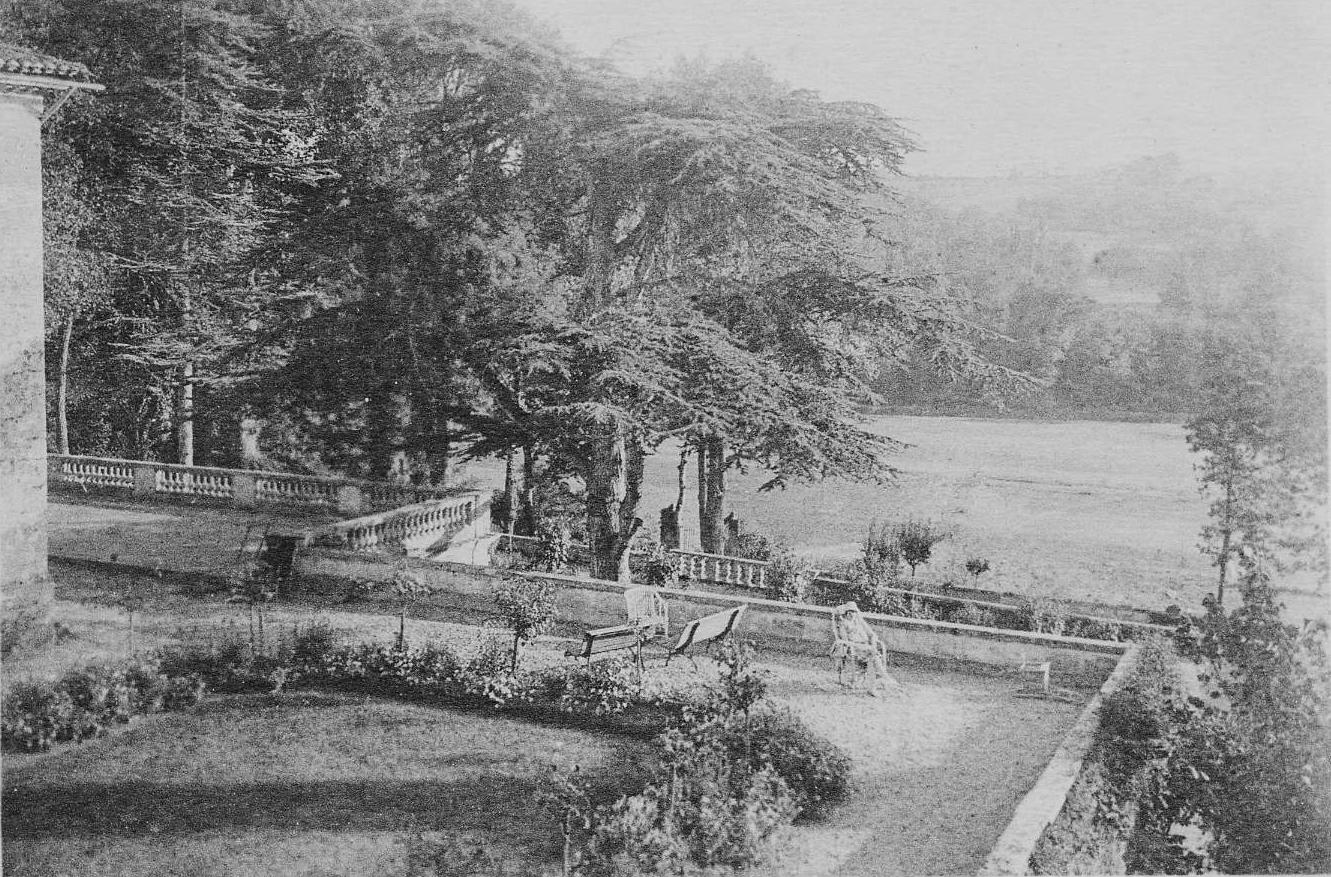
Château Lagorce terrace view

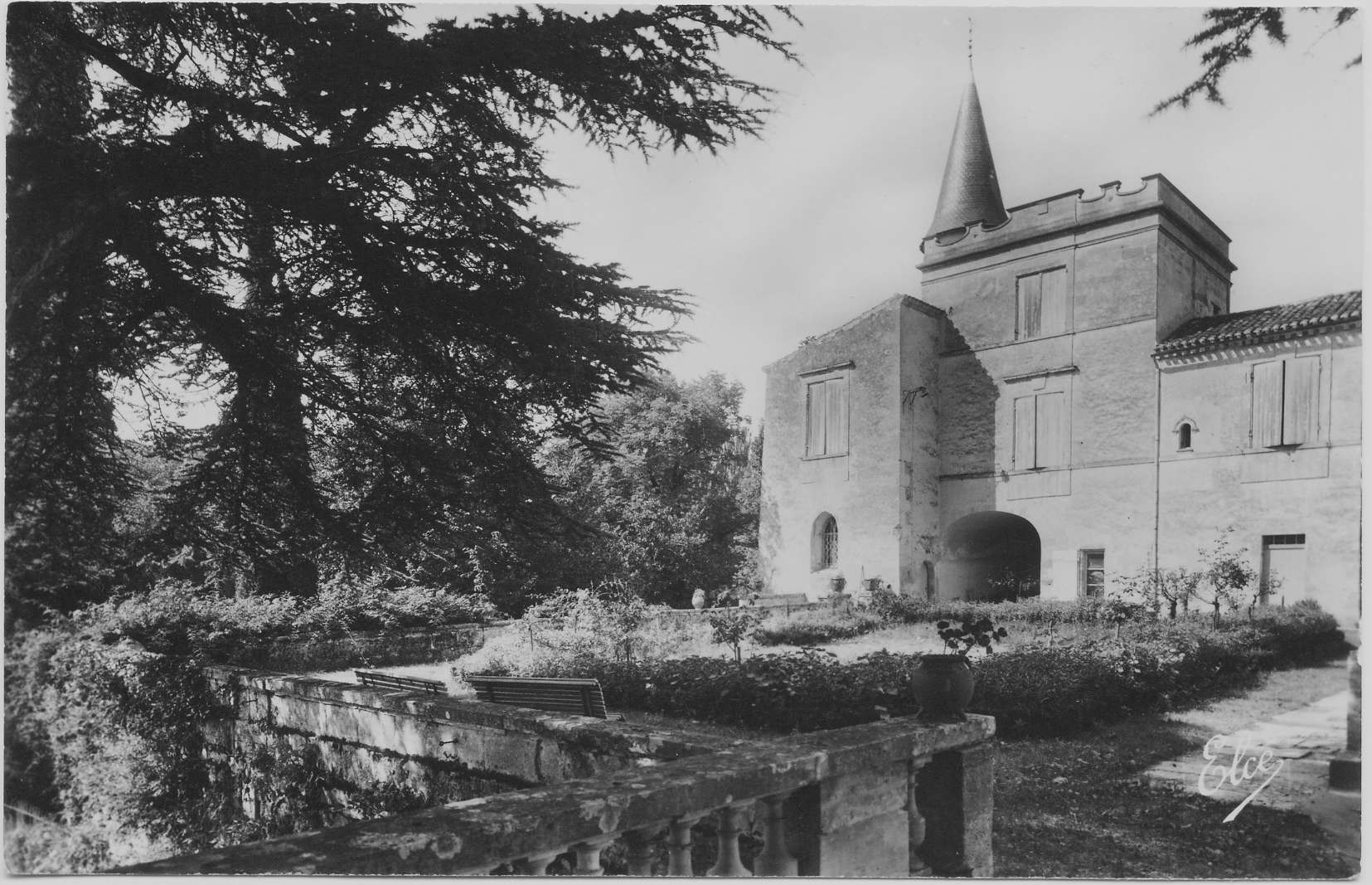
Upshot of the turret

The Château Lagorce is a former castle, converted into a château, in the commune of Haux in the département of Gironde, France.

== History ==
According to a document from the 18th century, the château originally had a moat. The oldest tower has walls 1.2 meters thick, and both of these features helped it to defend itself, as it became embroiled in feudal wars during the 14th, 15th and 16th centuries. The residence was partly destroyed during the latter of these centuries.

In the 15th century it changed hands with regularity as marriages took place. Bonnaventure de Faugeres claimed to hold the rights to the "Great Gorce" and initiated proceedings against his brother (or brother-in-law), Estienne Dumenilh de Faugeres. The claims were founded, as in June 1599 Lord Dumenilh gave him 16,500 pounds in payment for his rights. Bonnaventure seized the profit from his rent and from his agricultural activities, and in 1607 recovered the whole of the property.

In 1636 it was owned by Menaud de Maonaudon, married to Marguerite de Cursol. At the time of their installation at Lagorce, they accomplished major work on the property. Their signature is preserved in a keystone in the form of a coat of arms uniting the Montaudon and Cursol family.

After the French Revolution, in 1793, Francois Galatheau sold Lagorce to Hyacinthe Feger, whose nephew Pierre resold the property in 1802 "in a very bad state" to Elie Faux, a local wine producer.

The Faux family undertook important excavation works and planted Barsac and Sauternes vines. Therefore, the price of a tonne of wine reached 900F in 1858, compared to 250-600F for the other best wines in Haux.

In 1859 the property was sold to Jules Beyssac. After his death in 1895, and that of his wife in 1905, his children had joint possession at Lagorce. After the house was briefly passed onto the Burette family, the Baudier family had the house until 2003. In 2003, the Holmes family bought Lagorce. The building underwent complete internal retrofit back to how it would have looked a few hundred years ago. The Holmes family and the renovated Chateau have been featured in the ongoing British syndicated television series Escape to the Chateau DIY. Edd Holmes & his wife Anna have also created their own very successful YouTube series: Bordeaux Life which chronicles the continuing restoration of this historic property along with glimpses of the wedding venue business they have established there. An ongoing highlight of those videos is their interaction with several other expat British nouveau Chateau owners throughout France, with whom they have developed close friendships, often appearing in each others Youtube videos.

== See also ==
- List of castles in France
