= Martigné-sur-Mayenne =

- Commune
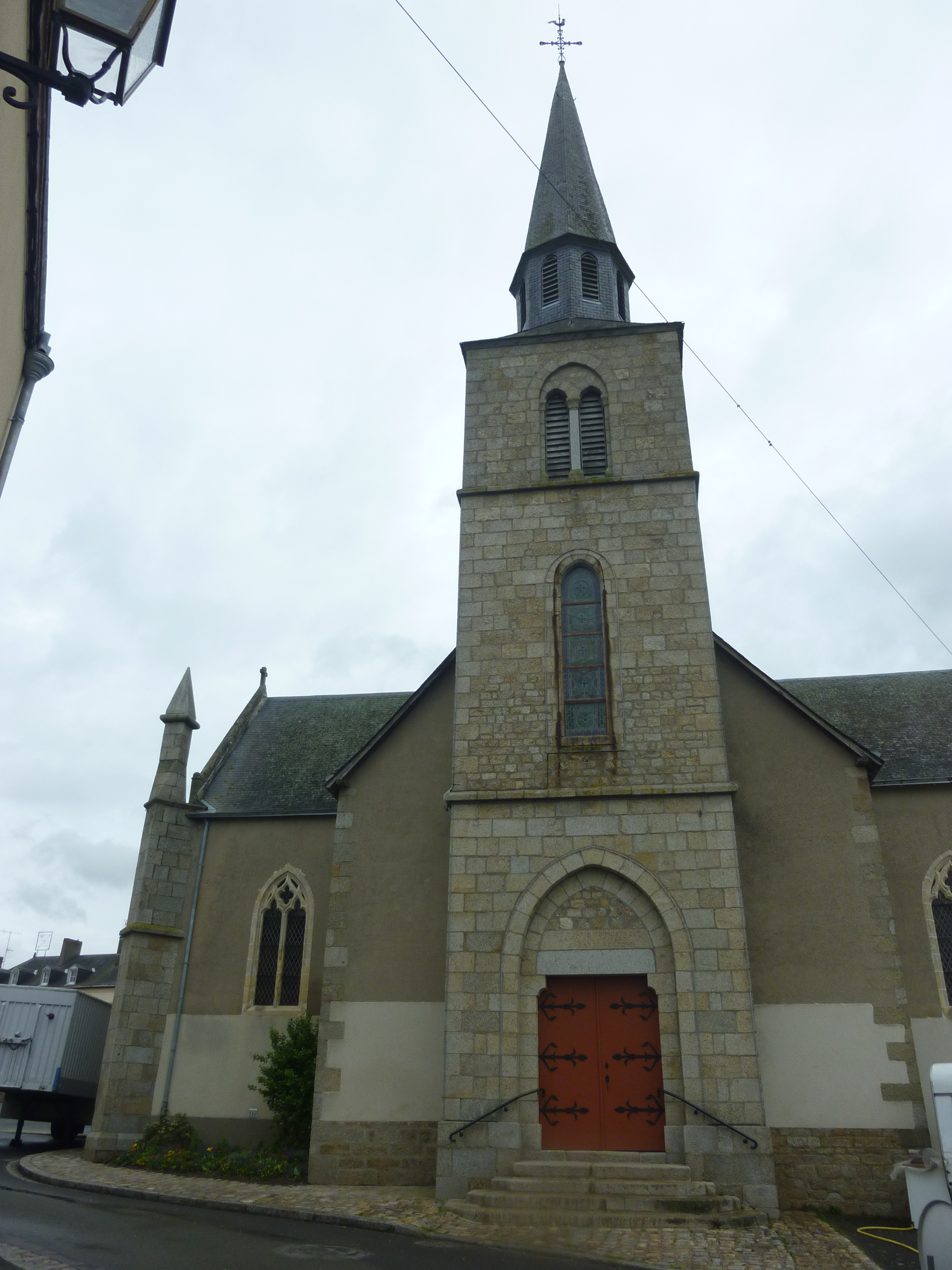
- The church in Martigné-sur-Mayenne
- Location of Martigné-sur-Mayenne
- Location within France Location within Pays de la Loire
- Coordinates: 48°11′43″N 0°39′42″W
- Country: France
- Region: Pays de la Loire
- Department: Mayenne
- Arrondissement: Mayenne
- Canton: Lassay-les-Châteaux

Government
  - Mayor (2020–2026): Guillaume Carré
- Area^{1}: 31.61 km^{2} (12.20 sq mi)
- Elevation: 131 m (430 ft)
- Highest elevation: 165 m (541 ft)
- Lowest elevation: 72 m (236 ft)
- Population (2023): 1,902
  - Density: 60.17/km^{2} (155.8/sq mi)
- Time zone: UTC+01:00 (CET)
  - Summer (DST): UTC+02:00 (CEST)
- INSEE/Postal code: 53146 /53470
- ^{1} French Land Register data, which excludes lakes, ponds, glaciers > 1 km^{2} (0.386 sq mi or 247 acres) and river estuaries.

Martigné-sur-Mayenne (French pronunciation: [maʁtiɲe syʁ majɛn], before 1984: Martigné) is a commune in the Mayenne department in north-western France.

The commune contains the Château de la Motte-Husson, owned by Dick Strawbridge and Angel Adoree, which features in the Channel 4 television series Escape to the Chateau.

== See also ==
- Communes of Mayenne
