= Patrick Whitefield =

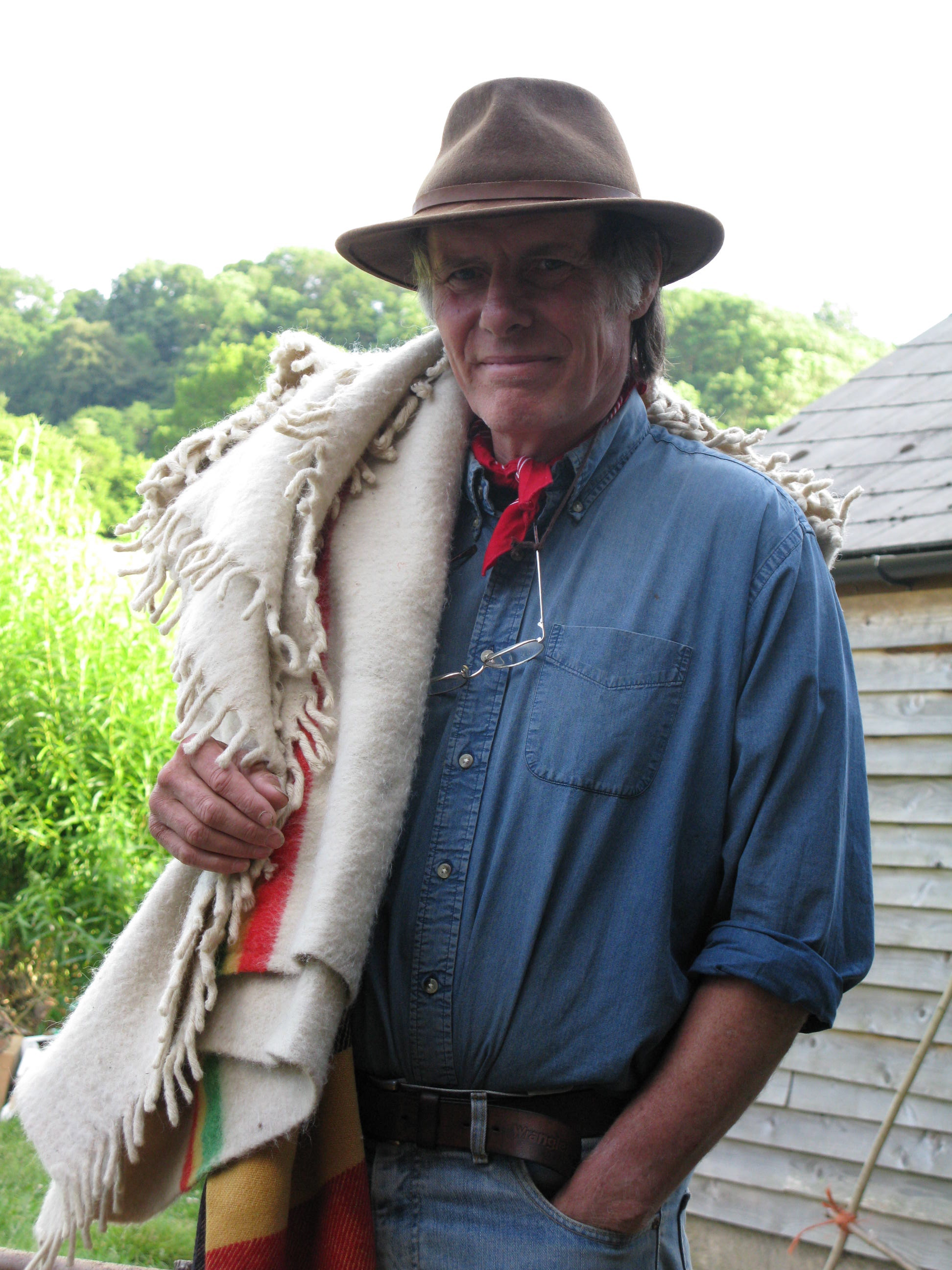
- Whitefield on 19 June 2009
- Born: Patrick R. Vickers; 11 February 1949; Devizes, Wiltshire, England
- Died: 27 February 2015 (aged 66); Glastonbury, Somerset, England
- Occupation: Permaculturist

Patrick Whitefield (born Patrick R. Vickers, 11 February 1949 – 27 February 2015) was a British permaculture teacher, designer, author, and consulting editor for Permaculture Magazine. He was regarded as one of the leading and pioneering permaculture authorities in Europe.

== Life ==
He was born Patrick Vickers, in Devizes, Wiltshire, and grew up on a smallholding in Somerset before studying agriculture at Shuttleworth College in Bedfordshire. After several years working in agriculture in the Middle East and Africa, he returned to Somerset and bought a flower-rich hay meadow, the White Field near Butleigh, to maintain it as a nature reserve. Thereafter he took his name from the field, which, after 25 years, he transferred to the care of the Somerset Wildlife Trust.

As well as producing vegetables, Whitefield undertook a variety of traditional country crafts, and for a period was a prominent member of the Ecology Party (forerunner of the Green Party of England and Wales) and was involved in the early years of the Glastonbury music festival. He was an influential British exponent of the permaculture system from 1990, developing his own approach. He was interviewed in several television programmes advocating permaculture, including the BBC's It's Not Easy Being Green (2006) and A Farm for the Future (2008).

He taught on various courses in England, including at Ragmans Lane Farm in Gloucestershire and created the first online permaculture design course in Britain. He also worked as a permaculture design consultant, and set up Patrick Whitefield Associates to pass on his skills and experience to a new generation of teachers.

He died at his home in Glastonbury, Somerset, on 27 February 2015, aged 66.

== Books ==
- Tipi Living (1987) ISBN 9781856230162
- Permaculture in a Nutshell (1993) ISBN 9781856230032
- How to Make a Forest Garden (1996) ISBN 9781856230087
- The Earth Care Manual (2004) ISBN 9781856230216
- The Living Landscape, How to Read it and Understand it (2010) ISBN 9781856230438
- The Minimalist Gardener (2017); posthumously published ISBN 9781856232852
