= Château de la Motte-Husson =

Château in Martigné-sur-Mayenne, France

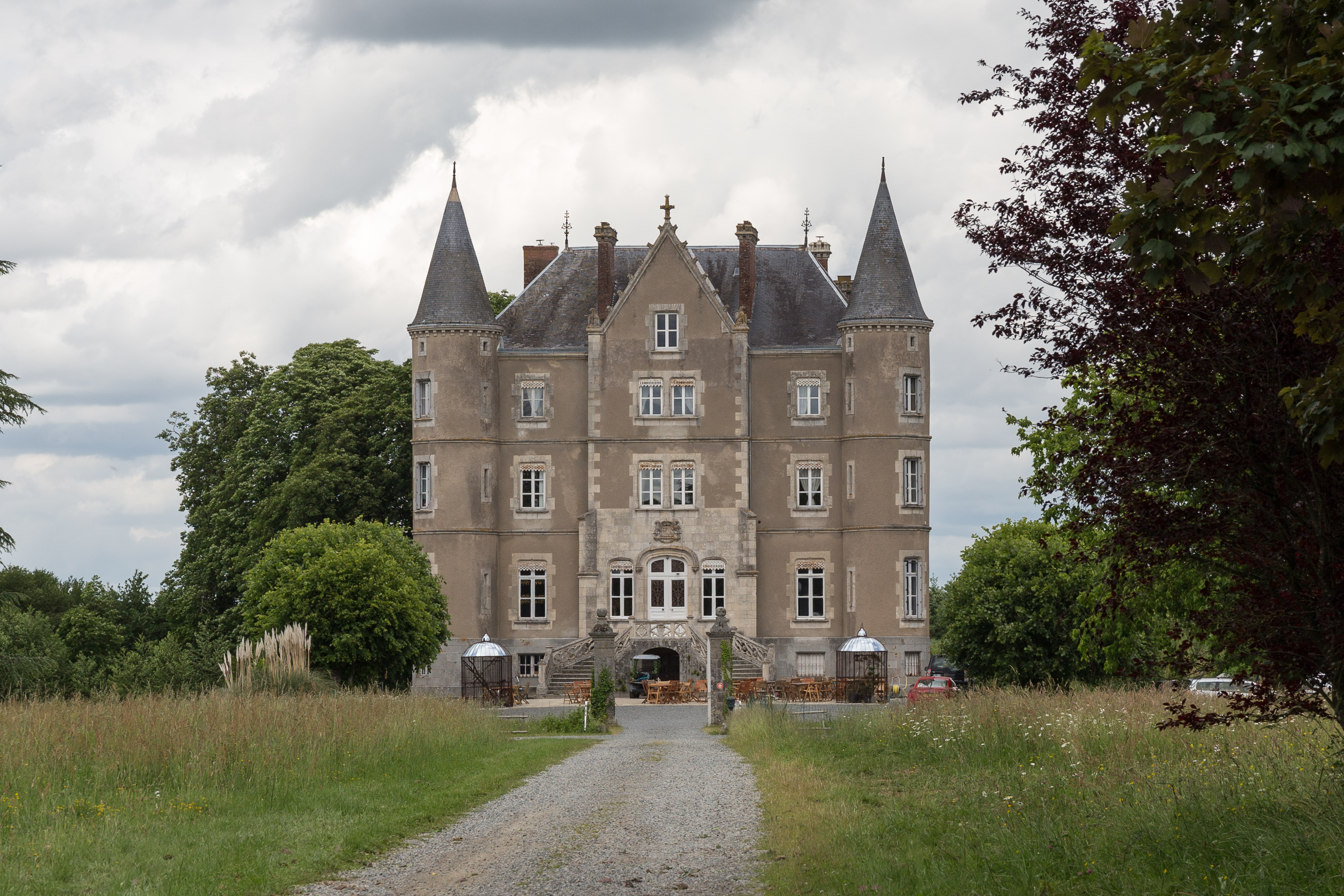
- Front façade of the château in June 2019

- Location within France

General information
- Architectural style: Neo-Renaissance
- Location: Martigné-sur-Mayenne, Mayenne, France, Château de la Motte-Husson, 49730 Mayenne, France
- Coordinates: 48°12′54″N 0°40′05″W
- Current tenants: Dick Strawbridge and Angela Newman
- Construction started: 1868
- Completed: 1874

Height
- Height: 25 m (82 ft)

Website
- thechateau.tv

The Château de la Motte-Husson is a Neo-Renaissance style château. It is located in the small market town of Martigné-sur-Mayenne, in the Mayenne département of France. The château is currently owned by Dick Strawbridge and his wife Angela Newman. It is the setting for the Channel 4 programme Escape to the Chateau.

== History ==
From the 12th to 14th centuries, the site of the château was located within the parish of La Motte and was a fortified stronghold. Henri de Husson received the land as concession from Jeanne "La Voyère d'Aron" in 1394. The Husson family, seigneurs (lords) of Montgiroux around 1406, gave their name to the château de la Motte-Husson, or Husson Castle.

The Baglion de la Dufferie family (a French branch of the Baglioni family of Perugia) acquired the estate in 1600. The castle was rebuilt in the enclosure of the old square moat. It consisted of a kitchen, cellar, 4 or 5 bedrooms per top, attic above, a chapel, a portal for a drawbridge, a bedroom on the said portal, a dovecote, on the whole, covered with slates, behind a small courtyard, ditches and moats around the courtyards, a kennel near the gate.

As of 1824, land records show the structures, referred to as "La Motte Château", still being intact, with the moat surrounding the fort.

The current façade is reflective of the efforts of Countess Louise-Dorothée de Baglion de la Dufferie (1826–1902), who told her husband that she wanted a grand residence built on the site of the fort. The new structure would be flanked by two large towers, known as 'pepper shakers', and with a double-ramped staircase, five floors and 47 rooms with separate private suites for Master and Lady, with servant quarters on the second floor and attic space. The château is surrounded by the old square moat, with a walled garden, stable-block, an orangery, and 12 acres (4.9 ha) of parkland. The original plans and invoices for the building still exist and are on display within the château. In 2021, Strawbridge estimated that "it would cost the best part of £1 million to do the same build today".

Countess Louise-Dorothée de Baglion de la Dufferie's main residence was near Nantes, about 160 kilometres (99 mi) to the southwest, and the family decided to spend winters in the milder maritime climate, with the château serving as a summer retreat for the family. It had been passed down through generations of the Baglion family. Latterly, Guy de Baglion de la Dufferie had received the title to it in 1954 from Xavier Marie Octave, Count de Baglion de la Dufferie and his wife, Elisabeth Marie Joseph Marthe Charlotte Treton de Vaujuas de Langan, as a part of a dowry. Following his death in 1999, it passed to his wife and children. The château remained unoccupied for nearly 40 years when it was put up for sale in 2015.

== Renovation ==
In 2015, the estate was sold by the Baglion de la Dufferie family to British television presenter Dick Strawbridge and his partner Angela for £280,000. At the time of sale, the château had no basic electricity, sewerage, or heating.

Over the following years, the couple, along with their children and Angela's parents, restored the property and the outlying buildings with the help of friends, family, and numerous fans of the show who have paid up to £75 a head to help with renovations. Additional funding for the project has come from a television series called Escape to the Chateau, broadcast on the British channel Channel 4 and devoted to recording the renovation, reuse, and upgrading of the château into a home and family business.

Some members of the de Baglion family still live in the area. In 2021, Dick Strawbridge said about them: "They have been nothing but welcoming and continued to maintain the property even after we had paid our deposit".

Nine series were filmed about Dick and Angel's life renovating the property, with the ninth and final series broadcast in the UK on 30 October 2022 and concluding on 18 December the same year. The decision to end the programme was made with the agreement of the Strawbridges.

== Legend of the wolf ==
Legend has it that the region's last wolf was shot from a window of the château. For many years a taxidermied wolf sat at the top of the staircase. It was removed before the sale of the château in 2014, and its current whereabouts are unknown. In 2015, Angel secretly designed and ordered a new replica stuffed wolf as wedding gift for her husband that would add to the character of the château and bring that tale to life. It has pride of place on the landing at the top of the stairs.

== Successive owners ==
=== Former domain of Motte-Husson (pre-19th century) ===
- Before 1600 - François de la Chapelle, Lord of Poillé, la Troussière, Fléchigné, and de la Motte-Husson.
- 1600 - Jacquine de la Dufferie, wife of nobleman Jehan Le Cornu Lord of la Marye.
- Before 1611 - Gilles de Baglion de La Dufferie (1582 – 1639), Knight, Lord of la Dufferie, d'Hierré, de la Marie, de la Motte-Husson.
- 1667 - François de Baglion de La Dufferie (1611–1678), Squire, Lord of la Motte-Husson.
- 1678 - Jacques de Baglion de La Dufferie (1649–1696), Knight, Count of la Motte, Lord of la Motte-Husson, de Laigné, de Cissé.
- 1696 - Jacques-Francois de Baglion de La Dufferie (1688–1728), Knight, Count of la Motte, Baron of Poçé and Marçon, and patron of Saint-Georges Church in Martigné-sur-Mayenne.
- 1728 - Jacques-Bertrand-René-Olivier de Baglion de La Dufferie (1712–1752), Squire, Baron de Poçé and de Marçon, Lord of Martigné, de la Motte-Husson.
- 1752 - Jacques-Bertrand II de Baglion de La Dufferie (1751–1807), Knight, Marquis, Lord patron and founder of the church and parish of Martigné, de la Motte-Husson.
- 1807 - Jacques-Bertrand-François Baglion de La Dufferie (1777–1848), Marquis.

=== Château de la Motte-Husson (since 19th century) ===
- 1848 - Count Jacques Octave Marie de Baglion de la Dufferie (1818–1888), Châtelain de la Motte-Husson in Martigné, wife in 1848 Louise Dorothé de Longueval D'Haraucourt (1826–1902).
- 1888 - Charles Joseph Robert de Baglion de la Dufferie (1850–1916), Marquis, Officier of the National Order of the Legion of Honor.
- 1899 - Viscount and Viscountess J. de Baglion de la Dufferie.
- 1932 - Count Louis Ernest Jules de Baglion de la Dufferie (1854–1941).
- 1954 - Count Guy de Baglion de la Dufferie.
- 1999 - Baglion de la Dufferie family.
- 2015 - Lieutenant Colonel Richard Strawbridge MBE and Angela Newman (Angel Adoree).

== Images ==
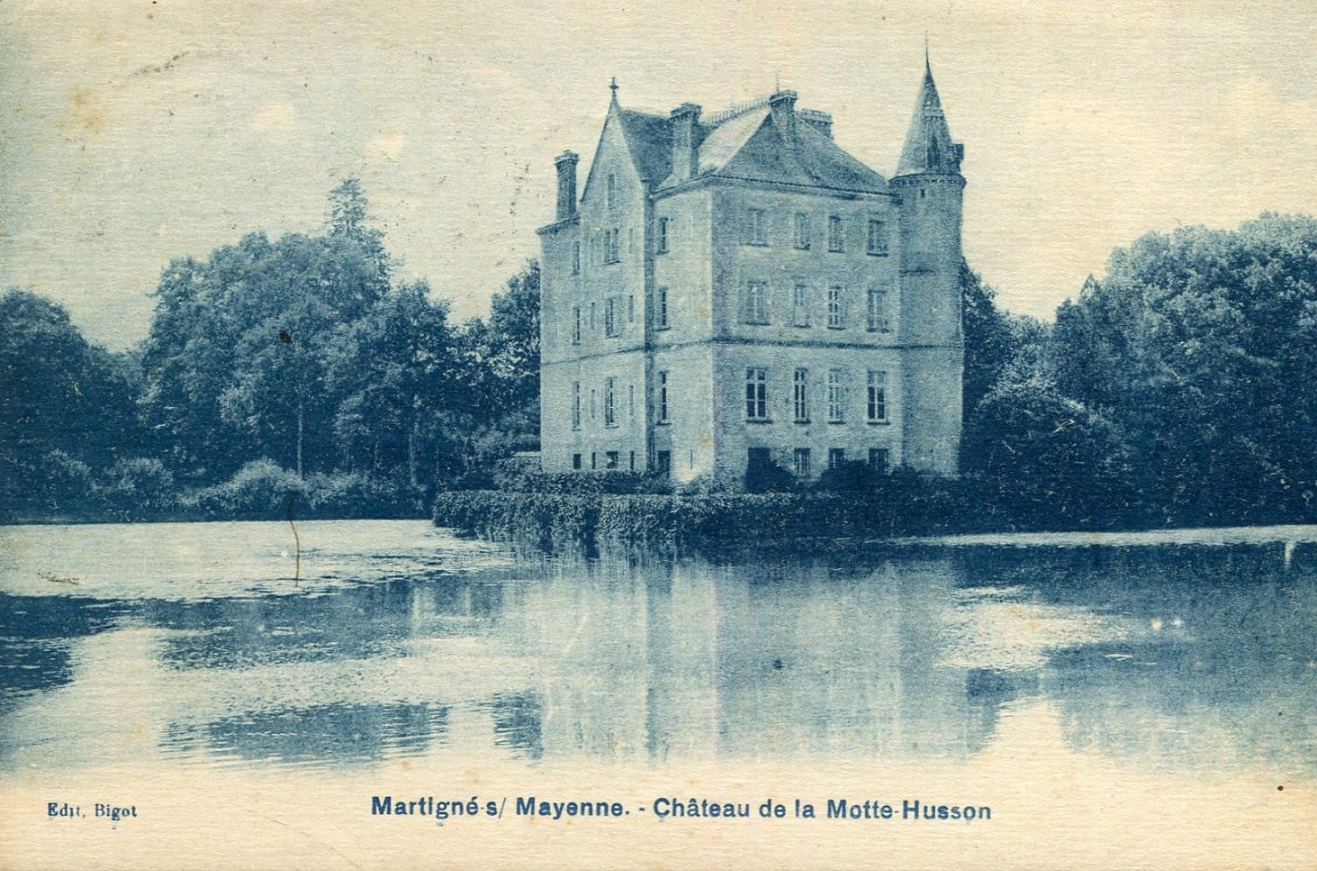
Château de la Motte-Husson (c. 1910)

== See also ==
- Châteaux of the Loire Valley
- List of castles in France
