= The Hungry Sailors =

- Presented by: Dick Strawbridge; James Strawbridge
- Country of origin: United Kingdom
- Original language: English
- No. of series: 2
- No. of episodes: 50

Production
- Running time: 60 minutes (inc. adverts)

Original release
- Network: ITV
- Release: 2011 – 2013

Related
- ITV Food

The Hungry Sailors is a British lifestyle show produced by Denhams TV. It aired on ITV from 2011 to 2013 and was hosted by the father and son team of Dick and James Strawbridge.

During the series, Dick and James travel round the coastline of South-West Cornwall on their boat, the Morwenna, visiting local food producers, inviting them onto their boat at the end of each show for a competition to see who cooks the best dish.

As well as travelling around Cornwall, the show also has visited the Channel Islands and the Isles of Scilly.

In July 2020, the programme was repeated on short-lived ITV lifestyle channel, Merit.
