= It's Not Easy Being Green =

2006 British television series

- It's Not Easy Being Green title card
- Starring: Dick Strawbridge; Brigit Strawbridge; James Strawbridge; Charlotte Strawbridge
- Country of origin: United Kingdom

Production
- Running time: 59 minutes (episode 1); 29 minutes (all other episodes)

Original release
- Network: BBC
- Release: 28 March 2006 – 2 March 2009

It's Not Easy Being Green is a television series on BBC Two starring Dick Strawbridge and focusing on how to live an environmentally friendly, low impact life. Three series were produced.

Series one followed Strawbridge, his wife Brigit, son James, and daughter Charlotte as they moved into Newhouse Farm, a 400-year-old listed building in Tywardreath, Cornwall, from Malvern, Worcestershire. The series documented the family's attempts to convert the building and garden into a comfortable yet entirely ecologically friendly place to live. Dick Strawbridge said: "I don't want to wear a hemp shirt and hairy knickers, I want a 21st-century lifestyle with a coffee machine."

In the first series, the family received advice from permaculture expert Patrick Whitefield and green auditor Donnachadh McCarthy. They were also helped by friends Jim Milner and Anda Phillips as well as at points a small army of friends and relatives. A book entitled It's Not Easy Being Green: One Family's Journey Towards Eco-Friendly Living by Dick Strawbridge was released to accompany the series.

Series two mostly focused on the Strawbridges helping others to achieve their eco-friendly goals, rather than on their own residence. Series three, broadcast in 2009, took on more of a "magazine" format, incorporating various regular features including the series-long renovation of a townhouse using "green" materials and techniques and interviews with celebrities about how ecologically friendly (or otherwise) their own lifestyles are. Lauren Laverne appeared as a regular reporter in the third season, and James Strawbridge also had a larger role as co-presenter.

== Newhouse Farm ==
Newhouse Farm was the home of Dick Strawbridge and his son James, and was where much of the filming for all three series of It's Not Easy Being Green occurred. The Strawbridges ran eco courses at the farm that included information about making biodiesel, harnessing wind power, using water power, and eco-engineering.

== Series 1 (2006) ==
#	Original airdate	Production code
1	28 March 2006	-
The family move into the house, and, with the help of friends – beer-guzzling students – and local businesses, they plant crops, re-tile the roof, and construct a wooden aqueduct from a stream to a water wheel, which it is hoped will provide enough energy to power the lights of the house.
2	4 April 2006	-
A greenhouse is erected with a unique heatsink designed by Dick and made from recycled bottle glass to keep it warm and the family acquire two pigs, ominously named "Christmas" and "New Year".
3	11 April 2006	-
Dick attaches a generator to the water wheel that powers all the lights in the house and the family enjoys a bumper first harvest.
4	18 April 2006	-
A heating distribution system is installed to help spread the warmth from the efficient wood-burning stoves to the rest of the house and to clear the house of damp. Dick and Jim make biodiesel from chip fat.
5	2 May 2006	-
Winter is closing in, but the heating distribution system is not working as well as intended – the wood burners can't quite keep up with the cold Cornwall winds. The children are off at university, spreading the green message. The well at the bottom of the garden gets a wind turbine-powered pump, and the water mains are disconnected.
6	9 May 2006	-
Both the heat sink and the water wheel have proven reliable. Dick installs a solar hot-water panel to complement the wood burners in the spring and autumn. 28 December arrives, and with help from Mike the farmer, and Chris the butcher, the pigs are slaughtered and butchered on the farm. People gather for the big New Year's Eve party, the centrepiece of which is spit-roast pig.
7	16 May 2006	-
A second wind turbine is erected, and a composting toilet is installed. Brigit gets into the cosmetics business by making her own moisturiser. Donnachadh McCarthy returns for a new ecological review. Result 9/10 (up from 6/10 before the move to Cornwall.)

== Series 2 (2007) ==
#	Original airdate	Production code
1	24 April 2007	-
In the opening episode, Dick helps a family with a ground-source heat pump and wind-turbine. Later, assisted by son James, Dick helps another family grow and cultivate fresh fruit and vegetables for a child with multiple allergies.
2	1 May 2007	-
In the second episode, Dick travels to Bath, where a scruffy urban garden gets a green makeover utilizing only free recycled materials. Later, in Cornwall, Dick helps a family build an eco-campsite.
3	8 May 2007	-
Episode three revisits two projects from the previous episode: the green urban garden in Bath and the eco-campsite in Cornwall. Later, Dick visits a couple who moved to rural Scotland to become more self-sufficient.
4	15 May 2007	-
Dick visits a homeowner who wants to restore the original features of her 1930s house using ecologically safe paint. Later, he helps a father and daughter install a solar panel on the roof of a Northampton home.
5	22 May 2007	-
Dick comes up with an ingenious solution for a man who wants a solar panel but has no budget. Later, the team meets a woman whose green lifestyle includes using a wood burner and eco-friendly alternatives to private hygiene.
6	29 May 2007	-
Dick returns to Jake and Candy's eco-campsite in Cornwall, where he observes their wind-turbine. Later, Zannah and Arthur discover it isn't easy adapting a green lifestyle in a conservation area.
7	5 June 2007	-
In this episode, Dick visits a magnificent house near the beach in Southern England with horrendous heating bills. Later, the team revisits a woman who has been undertaking an eco-friendly restoration of her 1930s house.
8	12 June 2007	-
Dick consults a primary school that needs to cut its water bills. Later, Dick and Jim help a mechanic power his four-wheel drive with a biodiesel engine fuelled with old cooking oil.

== Series 3 (2009) ==
#	Original airdate	Production code
1	7 January 2009	-
Newhouse Farm gets solar pv panels fitted to their outbuildings, James demonstrates natural deodorant with a group of semi-naked footballers, Lauren looks at eco swimming pools, and Dick interviews Phil Tufnell on how green his lifestyle is.
2	14 January 2009	-
Dick looks at the plight of the honey bee, James makes an earth oven with his friend Duncan Glendinning from the Thoughtful Bread Company, James and Brigit work on the garden of an ecovation in London, and Dick interviews Blur member Alex James.
3	21 January 2009	-
The pigs from Newhouse Farm are sent to the abattoir and Dick and James do some home butchering, Lauren Laverne is interviewed by Dick, and Jon Kay looks at the plastic recycling industry. Meanwhile, the ecovation continues in London as a massive rainwater harvesting system is installed.
4	28 January 2009	-
This week Dick and James help out their local pub with their soaring fuel bills. Lauren looks at green funerals, James helps a lady in York build an extension out of strawbales, Dick interviews actor Julian Rhind-Tutt and solar panels are installed on the London ecovation.
5	4 February 2009	-
James and Dick build a geodesic dome at Newhouse Farm, Lauren looks at the high end of the eco fashion industry, Dick interviews CBBC presenters Sam and Mark, and Jon Kay looks at the 'logic' behind planning regulations.
6	11 February 2009	-
This week at Newhouse Farm Dick and James collect bucket loads of apples to make cider, Jilly Goolden is the eco test guest, Lauren goes foraging with expert Carol Hunt, the evocation project in London acquired chickens, and Dick and James give an eco tip about soap nuts.
7	18 February 2009	-
This week Dick and his team make water flow uphill at Newhouse Farm with a ram pump, Lauren looks at green weddings, Jon Kay looks at carbon offsetting, and Dick interviews Nick Knowles.
8	2 March 2009	-
The final episode of the series sees Dick and James at Newhouse Farm preparing one of their home reared turkeys and their organic vegetables for a special lunch to be delivered on Bodmin Moor, James talks to Hunter Davies about frugal living, Phill Jupitus is the week's eco test guest, and Dick and James visit the London ecovation one last time.

== Bibliography ==
- Strawbridge, Dick (2006). It's Not Easy Being Green: One Family's Journey Towards Eco-friendly Living. BBC Books. ISBN 9780563493464.
