= Dick Strawbridge =

British television presenter

Lieutenant Colonel Dick Strawbridge MBE
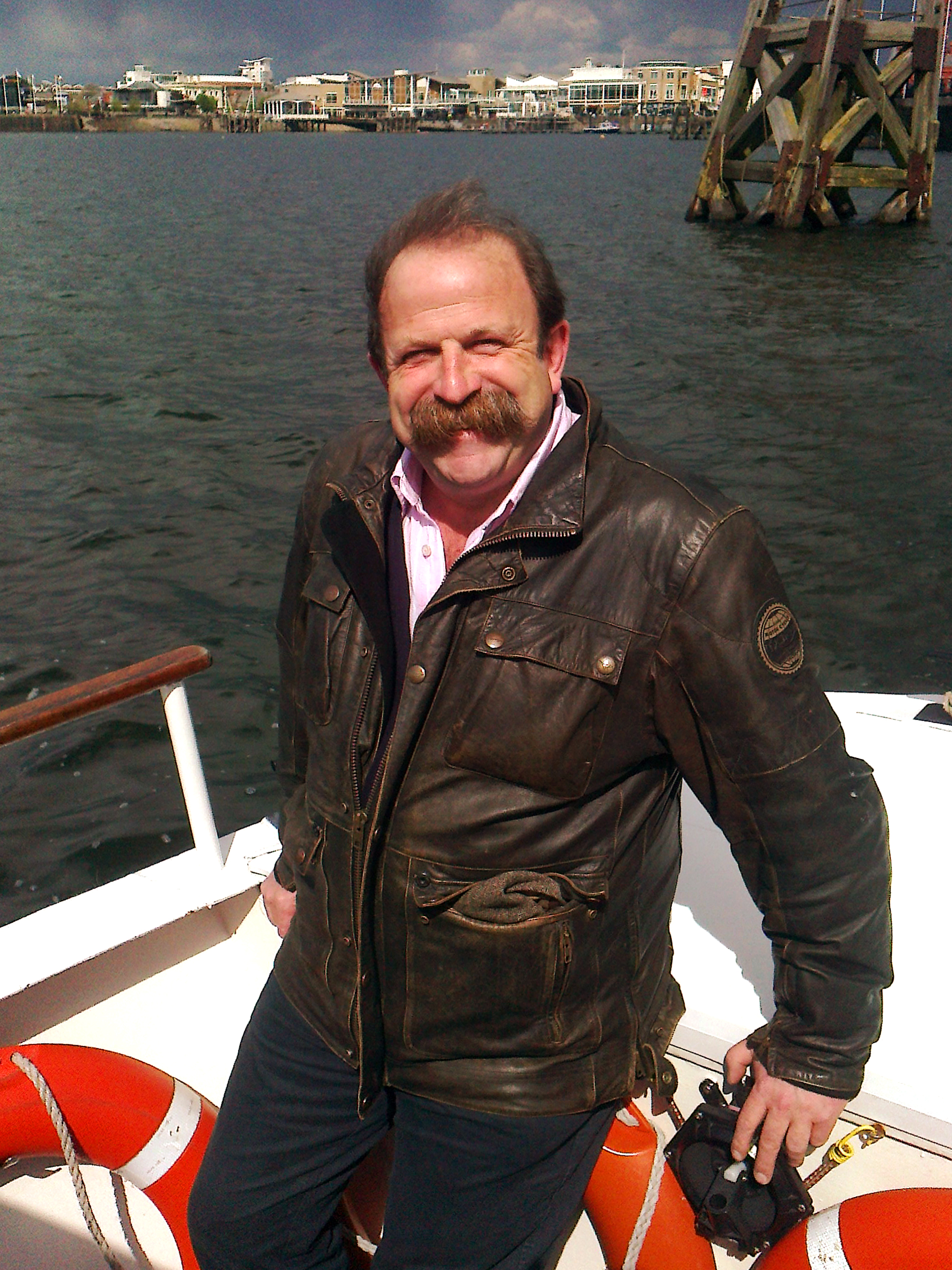
- Strawbridge in 2012
- Born: Richard Francis Strawbridge; 3 September 1959 (age 67); Union of Burma
- Education: Royal Military College of Science
- Occupations: Engineer, television presenter, environmentalist
- Spouses: Brigit A. Weiner (m. 1982; sep. 2010) Angel Adoree (m. 2015)
- Children: 4
- Website: dickstrawbridge.com

Lieutenant Colonel (ret) Richard Francis Strawbridge, MBE (born 3 September 1959), is a Northern Irish television personality, engineer and former army officer. He is often referred to as "Colonel Dick".

== Early life ==
The third of seven children of Jennifer and George Strawbridge, a worker in the oil industry in the Middle East and Far East, "Dick" Strawbridge was born in Burma, then raised and educated in County Antrim, Northern Ireland. He attended Ballyclare High School from 1971 to 1976. After taking his O levels, Strawbridge enrolled at Welbeck Defence Sixth Form College before going on to Sandhurst.

== Army career ==
Strawbridge received a commission in the British Army in 1979, after attending Welbeck DSFC (becoming head of college) and Sandhurst. He joined the Royal Corps of Signals in January 1980. Promoted to lieutenant in April 1981, and captain in October 1985, he became a major in September 1991. He was made a Member of the Order of the British Empire (MBE) in 1993 for his distinguished service in Northern Ireland. He was promoted to lieutenant colonel in June 1999, and left the army in November 2001.

== Television career ==
Strawbridge has appeared as an engineering and environmental expert on various television programmes, including Scrapheap Challenge. He first appeared as a contestant on the team Brothers in Arms who became series champions and later, he became the main presenter replacing Robert Llewellyn. He has also appeared on three series of It's Not Easy Being Green for BBC Two, the six-part BBC Two series Crafty Tricks of War of which he was the main presenter, Planet Mechanics, and as a regular guest presenter on Coast. Following his switch of career to television, Strawbridge often refers to himself as a "telly tart".

=== Scrapheap Challenge ===
Strawbridge began his career in television as the 'Yellow Team Leader' for six episodes in the first series of Scrapheap Challenge. He has to date appeared in over 30 episodes of Scrapheap Challenge and Junkyard Wars, winning the Scrapheap Challenge trophy in series 3 with his two younger brothers, David and Bobby, as 'Brothers in Arms', and the Junkyard Megawars trophy in 2003. On 5 June 2008, it was announced that he would be returning to Scrapheap Challenge for its 11th series. Strawbridge took over from Robert Llewellyn as the main presenter. The series was shown on Channel 4 in 2009.

=== It's Not Easy Being Green ===
Strawbridge, along with his family, filmed three series of It's Not Easy Being Green for BBC Two. In series 1, which was shown on 28 March 2006, the family moved to a new home in Tywardreath near St Austell, Cornwall and attempted to live as green a life as possible, using renewable energy and environmentally friendly resources. The second series started in Spring 2007 with a different format: Strawbridge and his son James aided several members of the public in larger and smaller ecology projects around the country.

=== Coast ===
Also in 2006, Strawbridge appeared as a one-off presenter on the BBC Two series Coast, examining the workings of the Middlesbrough Transporter Bridge, a role he revived in the 2007 version of Coast, presenting a short part of the programme on the failure of Exercise Tiger. In series 4 of Coast in July 2009, Strawbridge examined the terrain of the Normandy landing beaches.

=== The Hungry Sailors and Saturday Farm ===
In 2011, Strawbridge and his son James filmed a 20-part series, The Hungry Sailors, that was broadcast by ITV, in which they sailed around Britain's coastline buying local food and then cooking it.

In 2012, filming began on a second series of The Hungry Sailors around the Cornish coast, taking in the Channel Islands and the Isles of Scilly. The series was broadcast from 1 July 2013.

In 2013, Strawbridge and his son James presented the ITV Food series Saturday Farm.

=== Dirty Rotten Survival ===
Filmed in the USA from March to July 2015, the TV series for National Geographic involved a 25-mile (40 km) hike through the Berkshire Mountains of western Massachusetts, with Dave Canterbury and Johnny Littlefield.

=== Escape to the Château ===
This programme followed Strawbridge and his partner (now wife), Angel Adoree, through their purchase in 2015 and subsequent renovation of Château de la Motte-Husson in Martigné-sur-Mayenne, France.

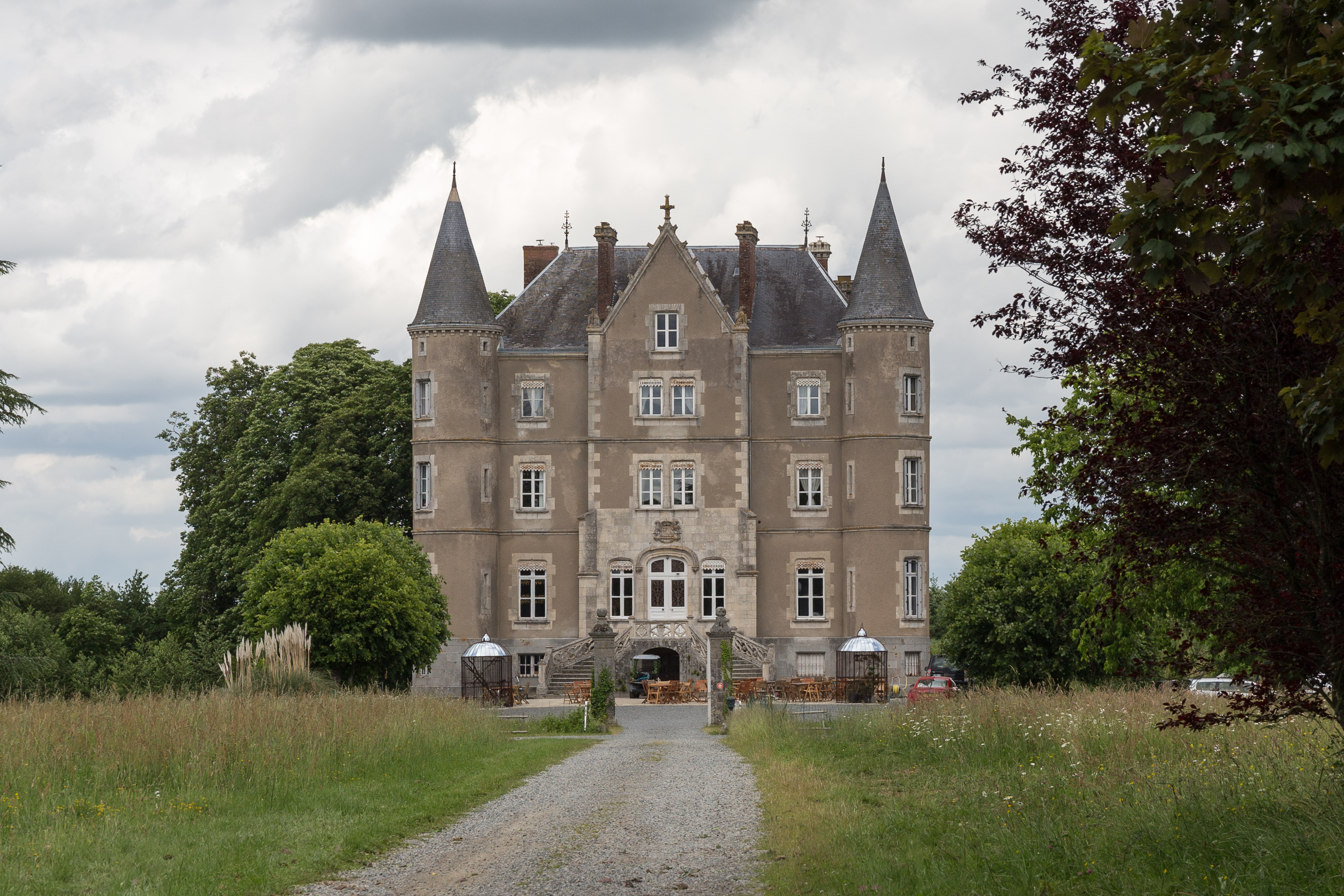
The family's Château de la Motte-Husson in 2019

A full nine seasons were filmed, with the ninth and final season starting to air in the UK on 30 October 2022. The decision to cancel was made with the agreement of Dick and Angel Strawbridge. However in October 2025, a tenth series was announced, with the first episode airing 31 May 2026.

The couple travelled to Australia and New Zealand in February 2023 with their Dare to Do It Tour. The plan included a series of theatre and book signing events, from 12 February to 9 March 2023. They had completed a similar Dare to Do It tour of the UK during February and March 2022.

=== Escape to the Chateau DIY ===
This programme, first aired in 2018, followed Strawbridge and his wife Angel as they helped expat château owners restore and redecorate their properties.

=== Secret France with Dick and Angel ===
In December 2022, the couple revealed that a new series with the working title Escape to the Chateau: Secret France (w/t), would air in 2023, about their "new journey to seek the unexpected and the extraordinary and discover more about France's history".

The plan was for four episodes of one hour each, a joint venture of Two Rivers Media, Channel 4 and the Strawbridges' own company, Chateau TV.

However, in May 2023, Channel 4 announced that the planned series would not go ahead, and it would not work with the Strawbridges again. "Following a review, we have taken the decision not to work with Dick and Angel on any new productions in the future," the statement said.

The announcement followed the leaked release of an audio recording of Angel allegedly swearing at a crew member. Production company Two Rivers Media also released a statement saying that it would "no longer work with Dick and Angel".

Dick and Angel Strawbridge subsequently released a statement via Instagram, saying: "There are two sides to every story and from the incredible support we have received, most of you know that. We are proud of who we are, and we feel we must do what we believe to be correct, that is in fact what kept Escape to the Chateau unique, and whilst we have indeed parted ways with Channel 4, we are hugely grateful to them and their teams for their support and creativity over the years."

The series was shown over three consecutive Sundays in June 2024 on Channel 4.

=== Other television appearances ===
Strawbridge also had a major role in the BBC's commemoration of the 60th anniversary of D-Day, and he was the co-host and resident "boffin" on the 2005 game show, Geronimo!. He also appeared as a regular team captain in the US series, Junkyard Mega-Wars.

Strawbridge also starred in The Big Idea, in which he tested out amateur inventions, and he featured in the short series The Re-Inventors, a series of five, hour-long programmes commissioned by the UK digital channel UKTV History and first broadcast through the week of 11 December 2006. Each episode featured Strawbridge and his son James reconstructing an invention of historic significance, with a budget of £500 and their mobile workshop. They then try it out against the real thing. UKTV History also shows "Crafty Tricks of War" from time to time.

On 13 November 2009, Strawbridge was a guest on Robert Llewellyn's web series CarPool.

In summer 2010, he appeared in Celebrity Masterchef, reaching the final.

On 20 November 2010, Strawbridge appeared on the Children in Need Special of Bargain Hunt.

In 2012, Strawbridge was announced as presenter of new Channel 5 series Beat the Ancestors, which commenced broadcast in February 2013.

In 2016, he was announced as a co-host of the three-part BBC Four series Trainspotting Live, which was broadcast in July 2016.

In 2017, Strawbridge presented Cabins in the Wild with Will Hardie, a show following a competition set up by the Welsh Tourist Board. Eight competitors were selected based on their designs to build cabins, intended to be combined as a hotel in the countryside, before one ultimate winner was selected. The two presenters also constructed their own cabin.

In 2018, Channel 4 broadcast a programme called The Biggest Little Railway in the World, which documented an attempt to get a model train to traverse the 73-mile (117 km) Great Glen Way between Fort William and Inverness. Strawbridge was the main presenter and lead engineer on the project.

== Podcast ==
Following the completion of the final series of Escape to the Chateau, Dick and Angel Strawbridge launched a weekly podcast titled Dick & Angel’s CHAT…EAU. According to Global Player, Dick and Angel's Chat...Eau will follow the day-to-day life of the Strawbridge family today, including "the inner workings of their unique family home, the upkeep, the projects and the adventures, big and small".

The first episode launched on Global Player and other major podcast platforms on 1 November 2023, and is titled "112 Steps, 2 Turrets & 1 Tip," and involved the couple looking back at how they found their chateau and knew that it was "the one".

== Personal life ==
Strawbridge married Birgit A. Weiner in 1982, with whom he has two children. The couple separated in 2010. He has two additional children with Angela Newman (born 7 April 1978; known as Angel Adoree), founder of The Vintage Patisserie, whom he married in November 2015. She had founded the Vintage business in London about 10 years earlier; it was relocated to the couple's château in the Pays de la Loire region of France in 2015.

Strawbridge was awarded an Honorary Doctorate of Science from Plymouth University in 2010.

Dick with James Strawbridge (celebrity chef son) are the authors of Preserves, a book in the "Made at Home" series published by Mitchell Beazley in 2012.

Strawbridge is a Presbyterian.
