= Shiel Bridge =

Coordinates: 57.21382°N 5.41678°W

Shiel Bridge: Scottish Gaelic: Drochaid Sheile; Scots: Shiel Brig
- Location within the Highland council area
- OS grid reference: NG937188
- Council area: Highland
- Country: Scotland
- Sovereign state: United Kingdom
- Postcode district: IV40 8
- Police: Scotland
- Fire: Scottish
- Ambulance: Scottish

Shiel Bridge is a hamlet on the south east shore of Loch Duich at the foot of Glen Shiel, in the Lochalsh area of the Scottish Highlands. It is in the council area of Highland.

== Geography ==
To the east of the hamlet, the River Shiel empties into the small Loch Shiel. The river then continues east, under the old bridge over the river (from where the hamlet derives its name), until it empties in Loch Duich.

The River Shiel, before it arrives at Shiel Bridge, is joined by a tributary river, the Allt Undalain, which flows down the eastern side of Sgùrr Mhic Bharraich.

The hamlet of Ratagan is 1 mile (2 kilometres) south east of the hamet. The A87 road passes through the hamlet, continuing on along the north coast of Loch Duich, passing Dornie, Nostie and Kirkton on to Kyle of Lochalsh.

Over the original Shiel Bridge is an old military road (the C1123) that is known as the Bealach Ratagain, connecting the communities of Ratagan, Glenelg, Arnisdale, Letterfearn and Corran to the A87.

Due to the surrounding mountains and forests, Shiel Bridge is a popular site for hillwalkers, accessible via bus from both Kyle of Lochalsh and Inverness. Both the Cape Wrath and Knoydart Trails pass through the village, the latter leading to Suardalan bothy if followed south and west.

== History ==
Nearby, the Battle of Glenshiel took place in 1719, where Jacobites, supported by around 300 Spanish troops, fought a government army loyal to King George I. Despite their superior numbers, the Jacobites lost.

== Facilities ==
The hamlet has few amenities, but includes a caravan park & campsite, and pony tours. Recently, a small filling station has been converted into a coffee shop and handmade chocolate factory.

Just south of the village are the Five Sisters of Kintail, a sub-range of the Western Highlands containing three Munros (Sgùrr na Ciste Duibhe, Sgùrr na Càrnach, and Sgùrr Fhuaran). Golden eagles, red deer, and wild goats are among some of the area's native species.
