= The Saddle =

Mountain in Highland, Scotland

Coordinates: 57.162395°N 5.414721°W

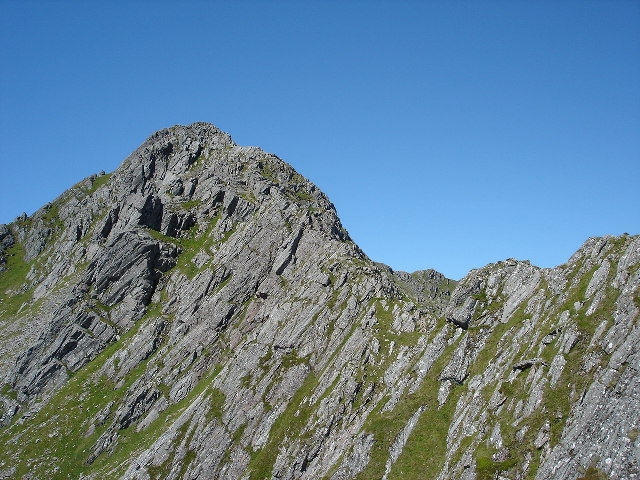
- The Forcan ridge on The Saddle

Highest point
- Elevation: 1,011.4 m (3,318 ft)
- Prominence: c. 334 m
- Parent peak: Aonach air Chrith
- Listing: Marilyn, Munro

Naming
- Language of name: Gaelic
- Pronunciation: Scottish Gaelic: [ən̪ˠ ˈtʲiəl̪ˠətʲ]

Geography
- Location: Glen Shiel, Scotland
- OS grid: NG936131
- Topo map: OS Landranger 33

The Saddle (Scottish Gaelic: An Dìollaid) is one of the great Scottish mountains; seen from the site of the Battle of Glen Shiel it forms (with Faochag) one of the best-known views in the Highlands. It is in the Highland local government area, on the boundary between the counties of Inverness-shire and Ross and Cromarty.

The mountain provides exciting and challenging climbing. The traverse of the Forcan Ridge – in winter or summer – is one of the classic Scottish mountain expeditions. The mountain's name refers to the shape of the summit ridge when seen from Glen Shiel with the twin summits and ridge in between resembling a saddle. The mountain was originally known by its Gaelic name of An Dìollaid but this has now been lost through common usage of its English translation and it is now one of the few Highland mountains which is commonly called by an English-language name.

== Ascent ==
The usual approach is to park beside the A87 just before the old quarry near Shiel Bridge. A stalker's path leads up westwards to a ridge at about 500 metres (1,600 ft), just below the outlying top of Biod an Fhithich. From here the route turns south and climbs steeper ground to the foot of the Forcan Ridge.

From here the route continues westwards up and over Sgùrr nan Forcan and so up to the main summit. This section is often regarded one of the best ridge walks in Scotland. There is no technical rock-climbing on the ridge, but a good head for heights, appropriate footwear, and some scrambling ability are required. (In winter a rope may be needed to safeguard the descent from the ridge.)

The Saddle has two summits: the westerly one has a trig point, but it is not obvious which one is the true summit. Munro baggers had better climb both. To descend back to the starting point, one can either retrace the ascent route, or drop south and then south east to reach the Bealach Coire Mhalagain, at NG944125. From here one can continue to Sgùrr na Sgine or follow the line of an old dry-stone dyke northeast to get back to the top of the stalker's path to Glen Shiel.

The walker not wishing to combine the ascent of The Saddle with Sgùrr na Sgine will find that a rewarding day can be had by continuing westwards over the smaller tops of The Saddle and descending to Shiel Bridge about five kilometres northwest of the starting point above.

== Images ==
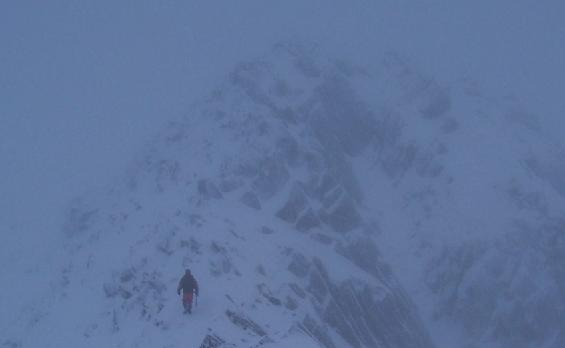
Deteriorating weather conditions on The Saddle in winter.

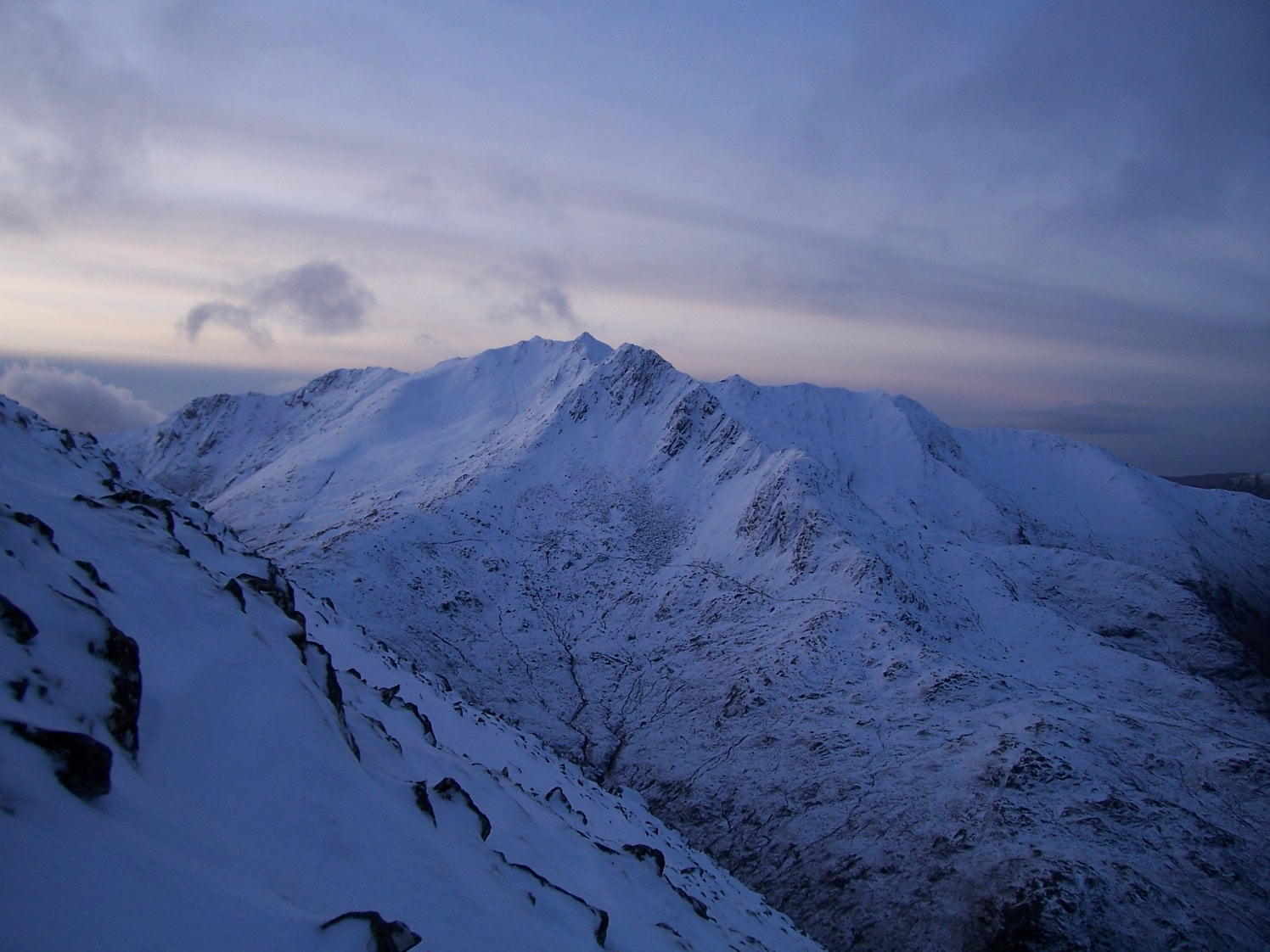
The Saddle and Forcan Ridge.
