= Sgùrr an Doire Leathain =

Mountain in Highland, Scotland

Sgùrr an Doire Lethain
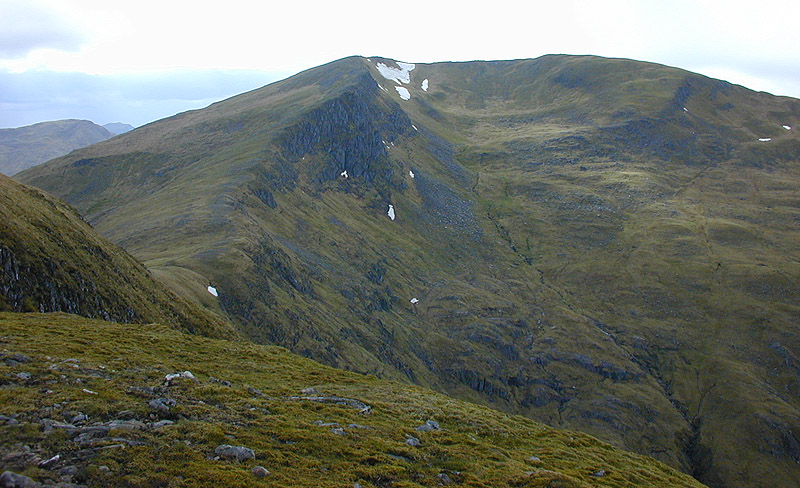

Highest point
- Elevation: 1,010 m (3,310 ft)
- Prominence: 189 m (620 ft)
- Listing: Munro, Marilyn
- Coordinates: 57°08′12″N 5°16′53″W

Geography
- Location: Highland, Scotland
- Parent range: Northwest Highlands
- OS grid: NH015098
- Topo map: OS Landranger 33

Sgùrr an Doire Leathain (or Leathainn; 1,010 m) is a mountain in the Northwest Highlands of Scotland. It is located south of Glen Shiel in the Kintail area.

One of seven Munros on the long Glen Sheil ridge, it is usually climbed in the conjunction with the other six. The nearest village is Shiel Bridge.
