= Ciste Dhubh =

Mountain in the Scottish Highlands

Coordinates: 57.1993°N 5.2096°W

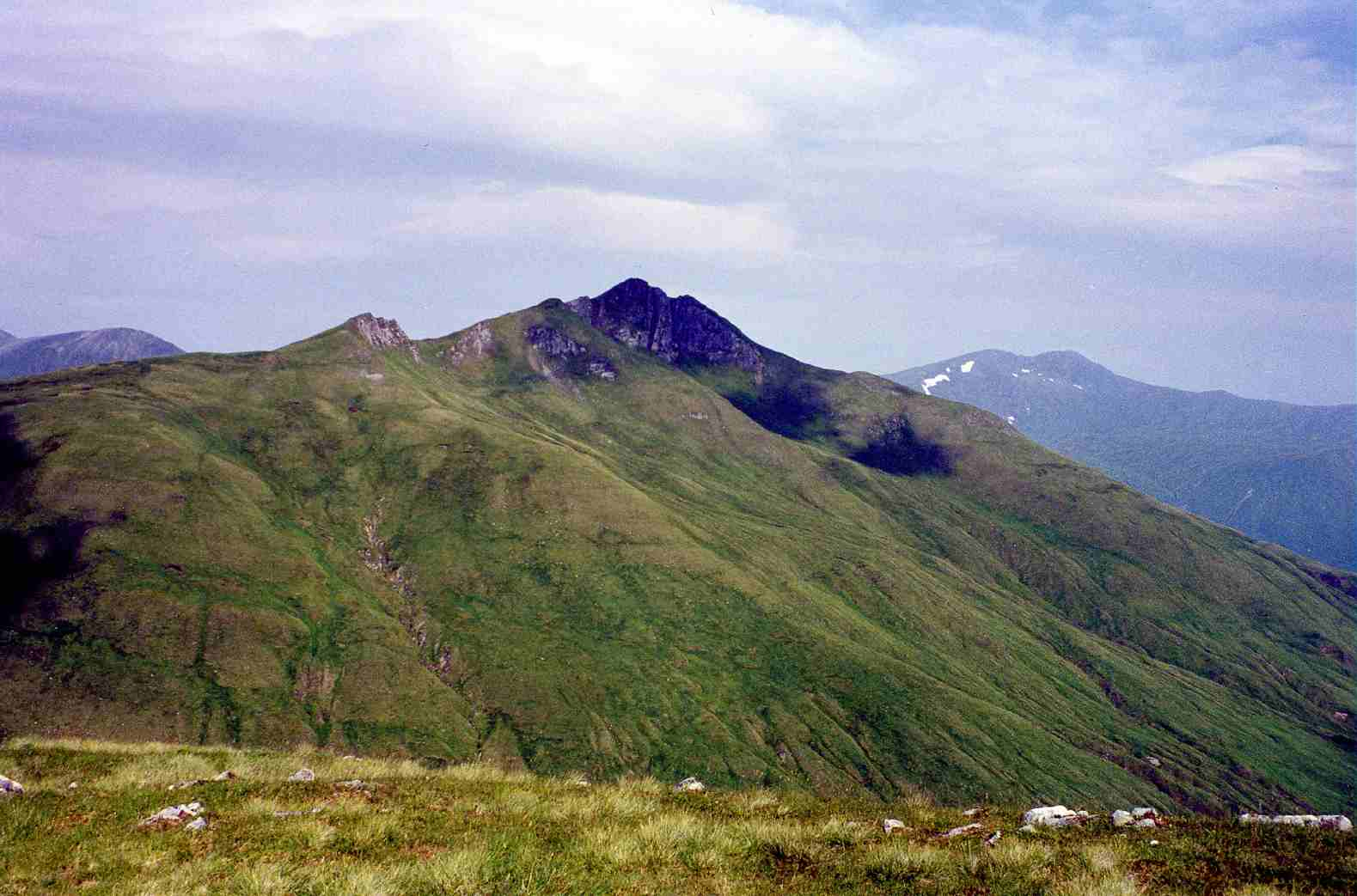
- Ciste Dhubh seen from the Corbett Am Bàthach, three km to the south.

Highest point
- Elevation: 979 m (3,212 ft)
- Prominence: 388 m (1,273 ft)
- Parent peak: Sgùrr Fhuaran
- Listing: Munro, Marilyn

Naming
- English translation: the black chest
- Language of name: Gaelic
- Pronunciation: Scottish Gaelic: [ˈkʰʲiʃtʲə ˈɣuh] English approximation: KYISHT-yə-GOO

Geography
- Location: Kintail, Scotland
- Parent range: Northwest Highlands
- OS grid: NH062166
- Topo map: OS Landranger 33, OS Explorer 414

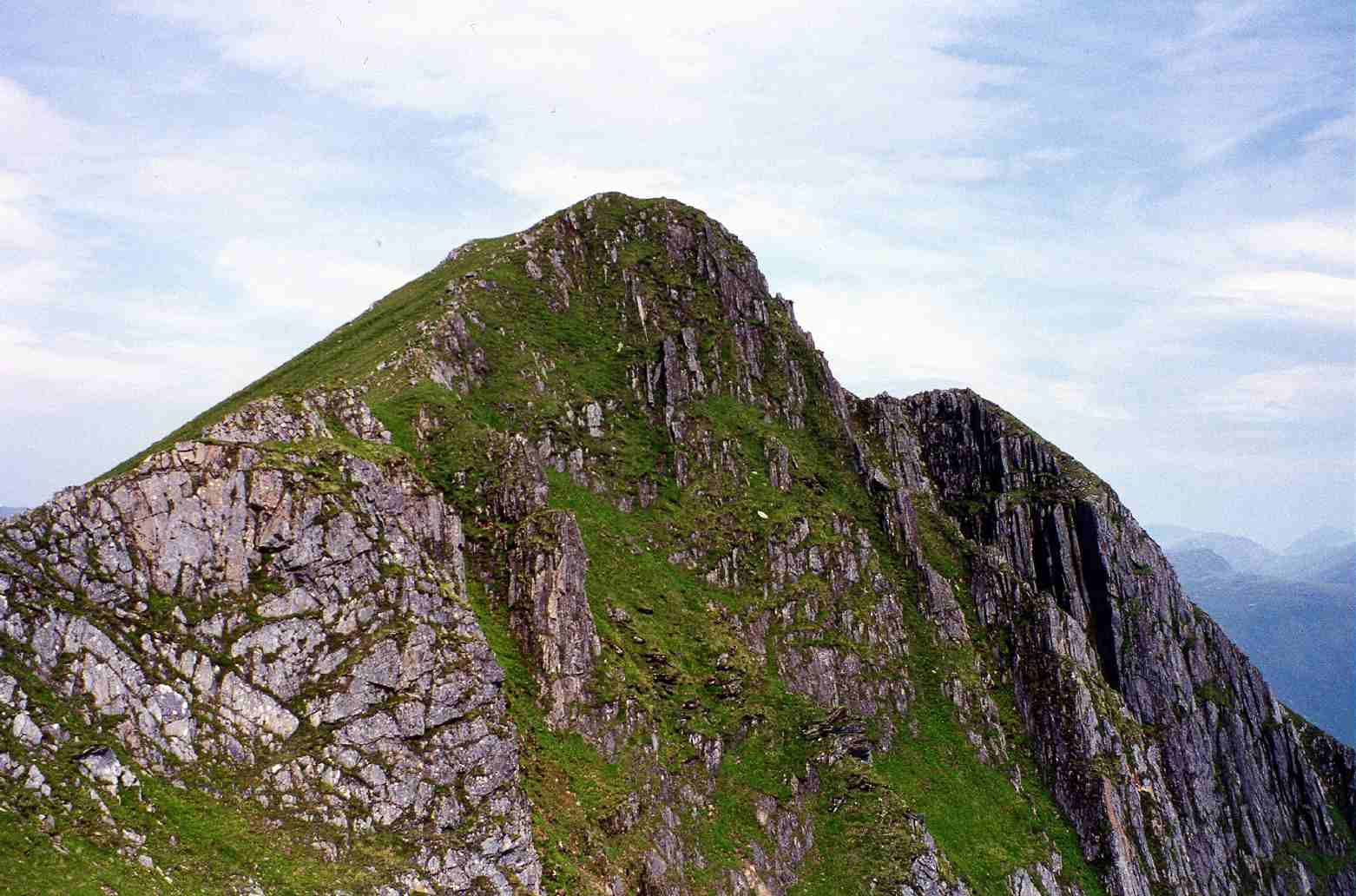
The steep approach to Ciste Dhubh‘s summit up the south ridge.

Ciste Dhubh is a mountain in the Scottish Highlands, between Glen Shiel and Glen Affric. With a height of 979 metres (3,212 ft), it is classed as a Munro. It is almost surrounded by glens: Fionngleann (north), An Caorann Mòr (east) and Allt Cam-bàn (west), with the Bealach a' Chòinich pass (south) linking it to the mountain of Sgùrr an Fhuarail. Its name comes from Scottish Gaelic A' Chiste Dhubh, "the black chest", possibly referring to the dark rocky summit.

== Landscape ==
Ciste Dhubh has a prominent pointed peak with flanks which are predominantly grassy with some craggy areas on its northern slopes. The summit is precipitous and rocky, and the southern ridge is steep and in places quite narrow, it offers few dangers for walkers but care is needed in high winds or under winter conditions. The mountain also has ridges to the north west and north which descend to upper Glen Affric. There are two small corries on either side of the northern ridge. Ciste Dhubh falls to deep glens on all sides except to the south where the mountain is connected to the adjoining Munro of Aonach Meadhoin by a col with a height of 591 metres called the Bealach a’ Choinich (Pass of the Bog). This pass, which lives up to its translated name, is strategically important as it also connects to the adjacent Corbett of Am Bathach and is vital to the walker who wants to climb the mountain with either or both of these adjoining hills.

All drainage from Ciste Dhubh finds its way to the east coast of Scotland over 80 kilometres (50 mi) away. This is surprising for a mountain which stands only 15 kilometres (9.3 mi) from Loch Duich on the west coast. The mountains north, east and west flanks fall into deep valleys which contain the streams which form the head waters of the River Affric and takes water away north east to the Beauly Firth. Drainage from the southern slopes of the mountain goes south to Loch Cluanie and then east via the River Moriston and Loch Ness to the Moray Firth.

== Climbing ==
The most common ascent of Ciste Dhubh starts on the A87 road just east of the Cluanie Inn on the shores of Loch Cluanie at grid reference NH082118. From there it is a four-kilometre (2.5 mi) walk up the valley of the Allt a’ Chaorainn Bhig to reach the Bealach a’ Choinich; an alternative way of reaching this bealach is by climbing the Corbett of Am Bathach which stands to the east of the valley. From the bealach it is a steep ascent up grassy slopes until the southern ridge is reached which is followed to Ciste Dhubh’s rocky summit. It is possible to ascend the mountain from the Alltbeithe youth hostel in upper Glen Affric by climbing the northern ridge.

The return to Loch Cluanie can include the adjoining Munro of Aonach Meadhoin, which is a 400-metre (1,300 ft) ascent from the Bealach a’ Choinich. The view from the top of Ciste Dhubh is good: the mountain is surrounded by higher peaks but none of them are too close (Ciste Dhubh has a prominence of 388 metres (1,273 ft)) and the nearby mountains of Mullach Fraoch-choire, A' Chràlaig and Sgurr nan Ceathreamhnan are well seen in detail.
