= Ratagan =

Coordinates: 57.22072°N 5.44038°W

- A view of Loch Duich from Ratagan

- Location within the Highland council area
- OS grid reference: NG923196
- Council area: Highland
- Country: Scotland
- Sovereign state: United Kingdom
- Post town: Kyle of Lochalsh
- Postcode district: IV40 8
- Police: Scotland
- Fire: Scottish
- Ambulance: Scottish

Ratagan (Ràtagan in Scottish Gaelic) is a small hamlet on the southwestern shore of the sea loch, Loch Duich in Lochalsh, Scottish Highlands and is in the Scottish council area of Highland.

The Ratagan Youth Hostel is located along Loch Duich.

The former Glenshiel Parish Church is on the road which passes through Ratagan, a little to the northwest. Ratagan House, which is in the hamlet, was originally an 18th-century farmhouse, which is recorded in the Royal Commission on the Ancient and Historical Monuments of Scotland (RCAHMS). However, it has been enlarged and remodelled over the years. It is recorded that James Hogg, the Ettrick Shepherd, stayed in the house with sheep farmer Donald Macleod in 1803. It is a Category B listed building, now used as holiday accommodation.

The hamlet of Shiel Bridge lies 1 mile (2 kilometres) southeast of Ratagan.

In February 2026, the Kyle and Lochalsh Community Trust took over part of a former commercial forestry plantation near Ratagan from Forestry and Land Scotland. Their plans are for an 'eco-village- with six affordable homes for rent at Ratagan, along with two business units, a community growing area and two woodland crofts.

In June 2026, it was announced that the Ratagan Fire Station would close. The building that was used by the fire service for storage is a barn built at Shiel Lodge Stables near Glenshiel, and was used since 2006. At the fire service's disposal was a LDV 400 Convoy which was modified for use in fire and rescue. A former wooden hut, built in 1989 is still standing, but not utilised by the fire service. Due to a lack of crew, the station & its operations had remained dormant since 2015.
