= Aonach Meadhoin =

Mountain in Scotland

Coordinates: 57.1727°N 5.2274°W

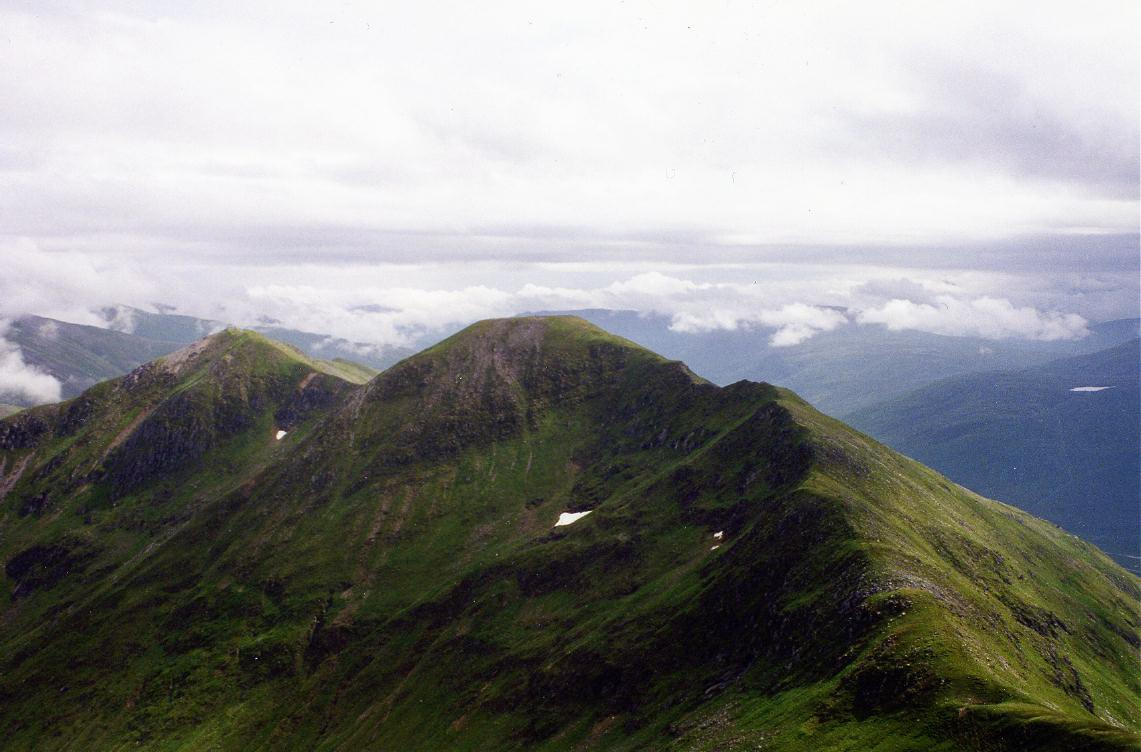
- Aonach Meadhoin (right) and Sgùrr an Fhuarail (left) from Sgùrr a' Bhealaich Dheirg, 2 km to the NW.

Highest point
- Elevation: 1,001 m (3,284 ft)
- Prominence: 174 m (571 ft)
- Listing: Munro, Marilyn

Naming
- English translation: Middle Ridge
- Language of name: Gaelic
- Pronunciation: Scottish Gaelic: [ˈɯːnəx ˈmiə.ɛɲ] English approximation: OON-əkh-MEER-ən

Geography
- Location: Kintail, Scotland
- Parent range: Northwest Highlands
- OS grid: NH049137
- Topo map: OS Landranger 33, OS Explorer 414

Listed summits of Aonach Meadhoin
| Name | Grid ref | Height | Status |
|---|---|---|---|
| Sgùrr an Fhuarail | NH054139 | 987 m (3238 ft) | Munro Top |

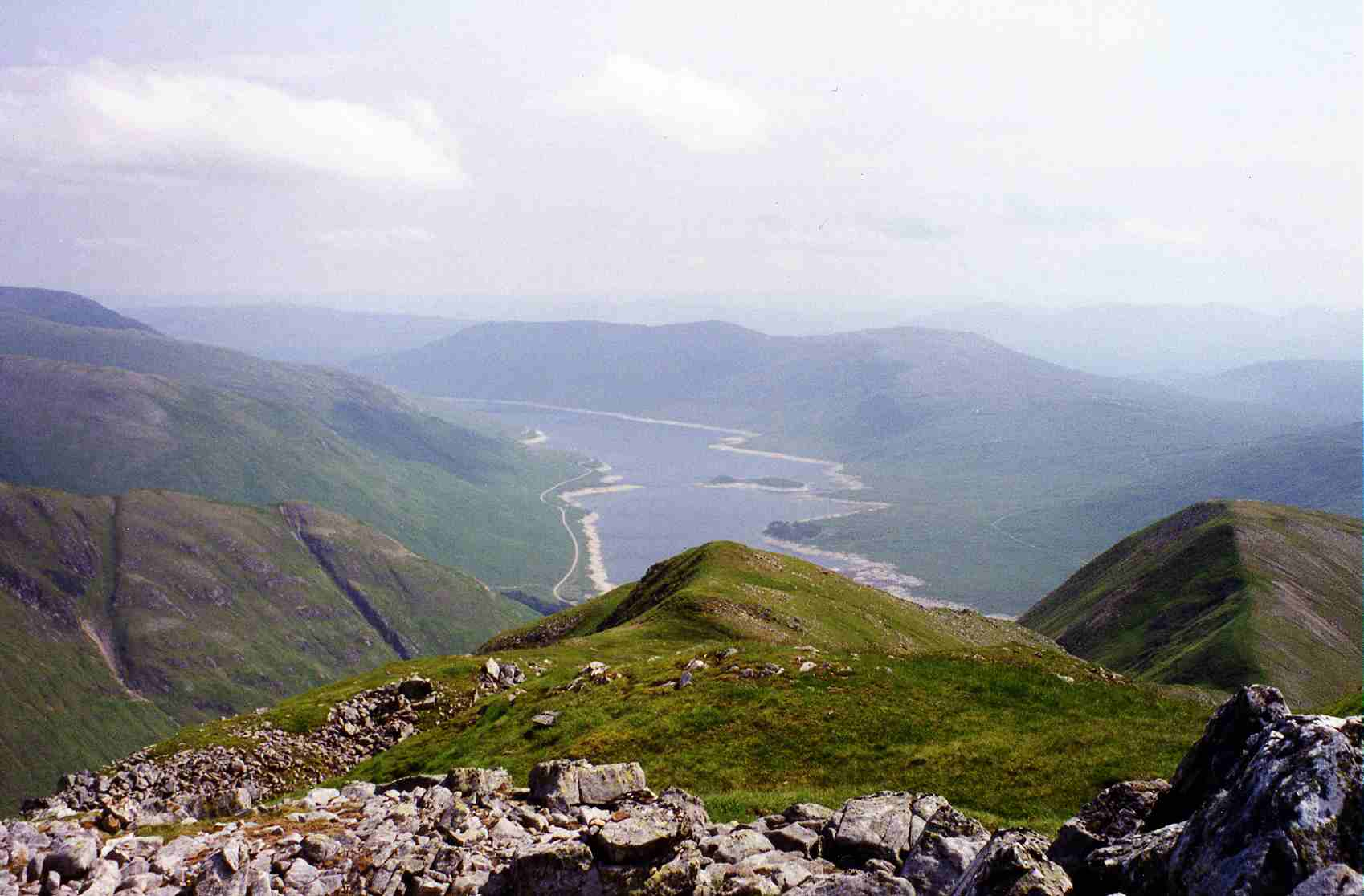
Looking down the south east ridge from Sgùrr an Fhuarail towards Loch Cluanie.

Aonach Meadhoin is a Munro mountain situated in the Kintail region of Scotland. It stands on the northern side of Glen Shiel some 31 kilometres south east of Kyle of Lochalsh.

== Overview ==
Aonach Meadhoin reaches a height of 1001 metres (3284 feet) and along with the Munros of Saileag and Sgùrr a' Bhealaich Dheirg it forms a group of mountains sometimes referred to as the North Glen Shiel Ridge. The group are also known as the “Brothers of Kintail” in a nodding acquaintance to the better known Five Sisters of Kintail just to the north west. The mountain's name translates from Gaelic as Middle Ridge, the mountain is shaped like a horseshoe with the summit ridge lying centrally between the two ridges on either side of Coire na Cadha which lies between the mountain and the A87 road two kilometres to the south.

== Geography ==
Aonach Meadhoin’s north and south faces are steep as they drop to the corries of Coire nan Eun (north) and Coire na Cadha (south); the northern face is craggy and holds snow well into summer. The mountain is made up of three main ridges which radiate from its summit; the western ridge connects to the adjoining Munro of Sgùrr a' Bhealaich Dheirg which lies two kilometres away. Another ridge goes north east for a kilometre to the subsidiary “Top” of Sgùrr an Fhuarail (Peak of the Cold Place) where it splits, the northern spur going for 2.5 kilometres to the Munro of Ciste Dhubh, while the south eastern ridge descends to the Cluanie Inn on the A87. Sgùrr an Fhuarail reaches a height of 987 metres (3238 feet) and is listed in the Munro Tables as a “Top” of Aonach Meadhoin. It is a fine viewpoint towards the east including an aerial view of Loch Cluanie, which is better than from the main summit.

All drainage from Aonach Meadhoin goes to the east coast of Scotland, over 70 kilometres distant, even though the mountain only stands 15 kilometres from Loch Duich on the west coast. The mountain's two main corries are major gathering grounds for Scottish rivers. To the north Coire nan Eun is the source of the River Affric which eventually finds its way to the Beauly Firth, while to the south Coire na Cadha supplies much of the water for the hydro reservoir of Loch Cluanie, eventually reaching the Moray Firth via the River Moriston and Loch Ness.

== Ascents ==
Ascents of Aonach Meadhoin are usually started from the Cluanie Inn on the A87 road. When viewed from the inn, the main summit is hidden behind Sgùrr an Fhuarail. The direct ascent goes up the south east ridge passing over Sgùrr an Fhuarail before reaching the summit. The mountain is quite often climbed in conjunction with other peaks, the SMC’s Munro guide recommends climbing it with Ciste Dhubh, three kilometres to the north, however it is often scaled with the other two Munros of the North Glen Shiel Ridge. This latter walk begins two kilometres west of Cluanie Inn at grid reference NH054114 and uses two subsidiary ridges to ease the climb and descent onto and off the main ridge.
