= Aonach air Chrith =

Mountain in Scotland

Coordinates: 57°07′29″N 05°13′16″W

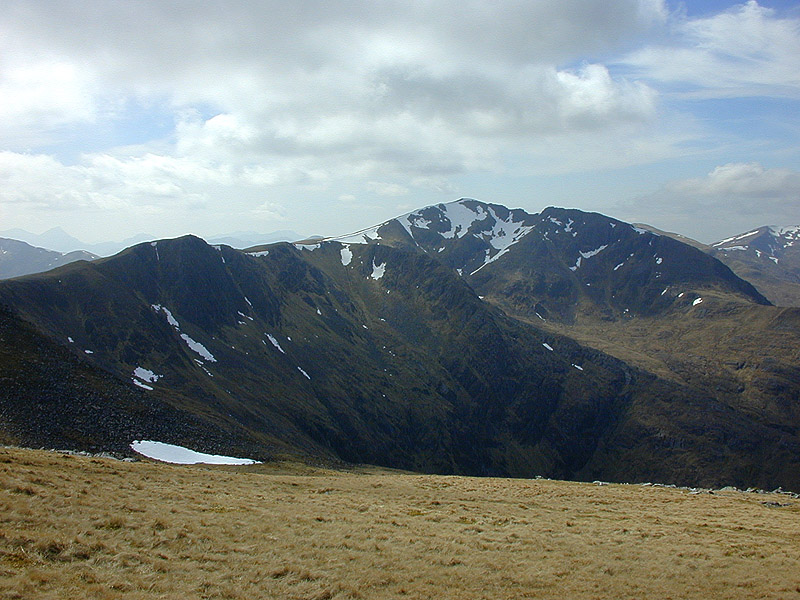
- Aonach air Chrith

Highest point
- Elevation: 1,020 m (3,350 ft)
- Prominence: 493 m (1,617 ft)
- Listing: Munro, Marilyn

Geography
- Location: Highland, Scotland
- Parent range: Northwest Highlands
- OS grid: NH051083
- Topo map: OS Landranger 33

Aonach air Chrith (1,020 m) is a mountain in the Northwest Highlands, Scotland. It is located on the southern side of Glen Shiel in Kintail.

The mountain is the highest peak on a long ridge of seven Munros, which is known to climbers as the South Glen Shiel Ridge Walk.
