= Sgùrr a' Bhealaich Dheirg =

Mountain in Highland, Scotland

Coordinates: 57.1763°N 5.2532°W

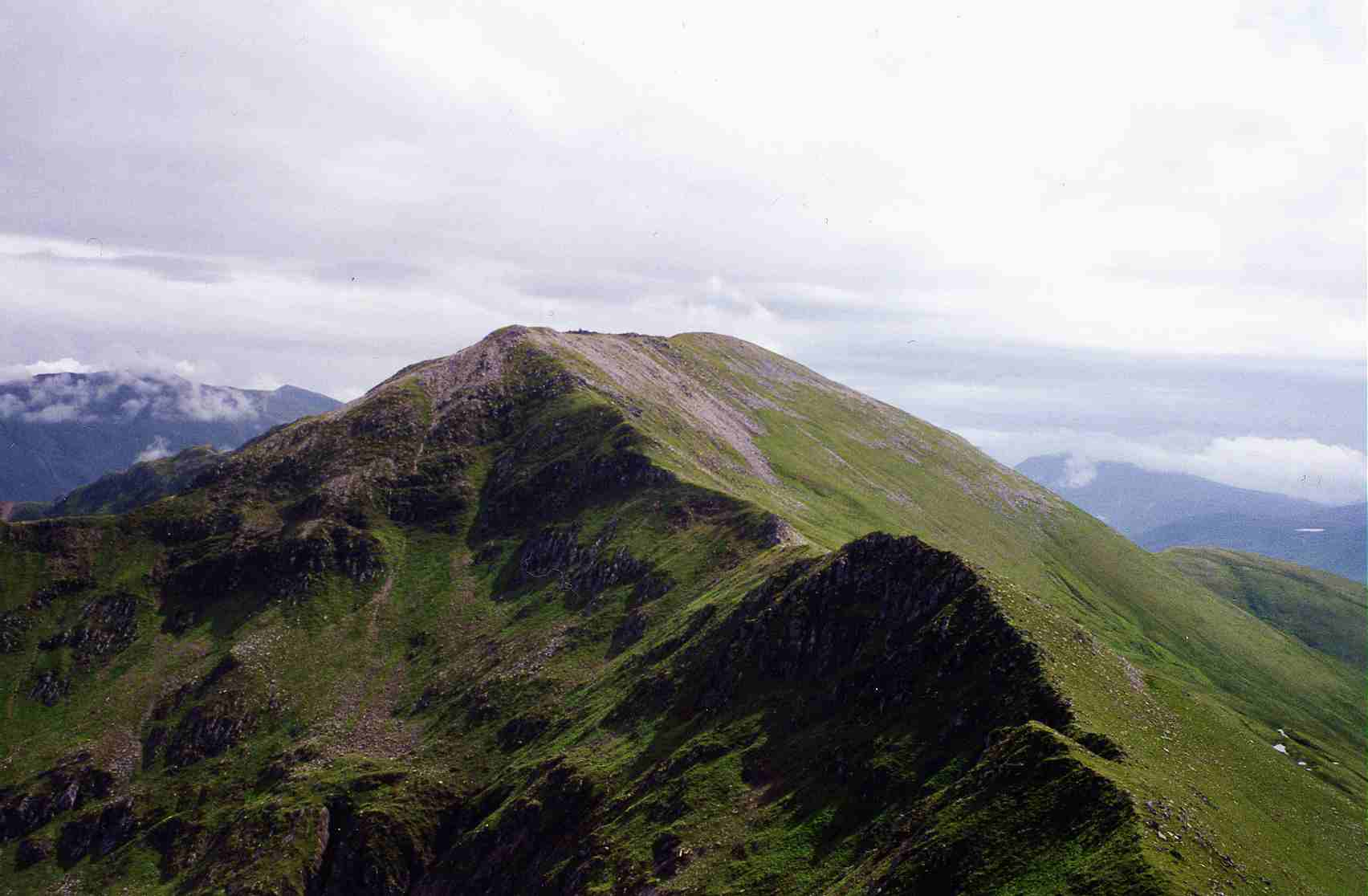
- Sgùrr a' Bhealaich Dheirg seen from Sàileag 2 km to the W.

Highest point
- Elevation: 1,036 m (3,399 ft)
- Prominence: 311 m (1,020 ft)
- Listing: Munro, Marilyn

Naming
- English translation: peak of the red gap
- Language of name: Gaelic
- Pronunciation: Scottish Gaelic: [ˈs̪kuːrˠ ə ˈvjal̪ˠɪç ˈʝeɾʲekʲ]

Geography
- Location: Kintail, Scotland
- Parent range: Northwest Highlands
- OS grid: NH035143
- Topo map: OS Landranger 33, OS Explorer 414

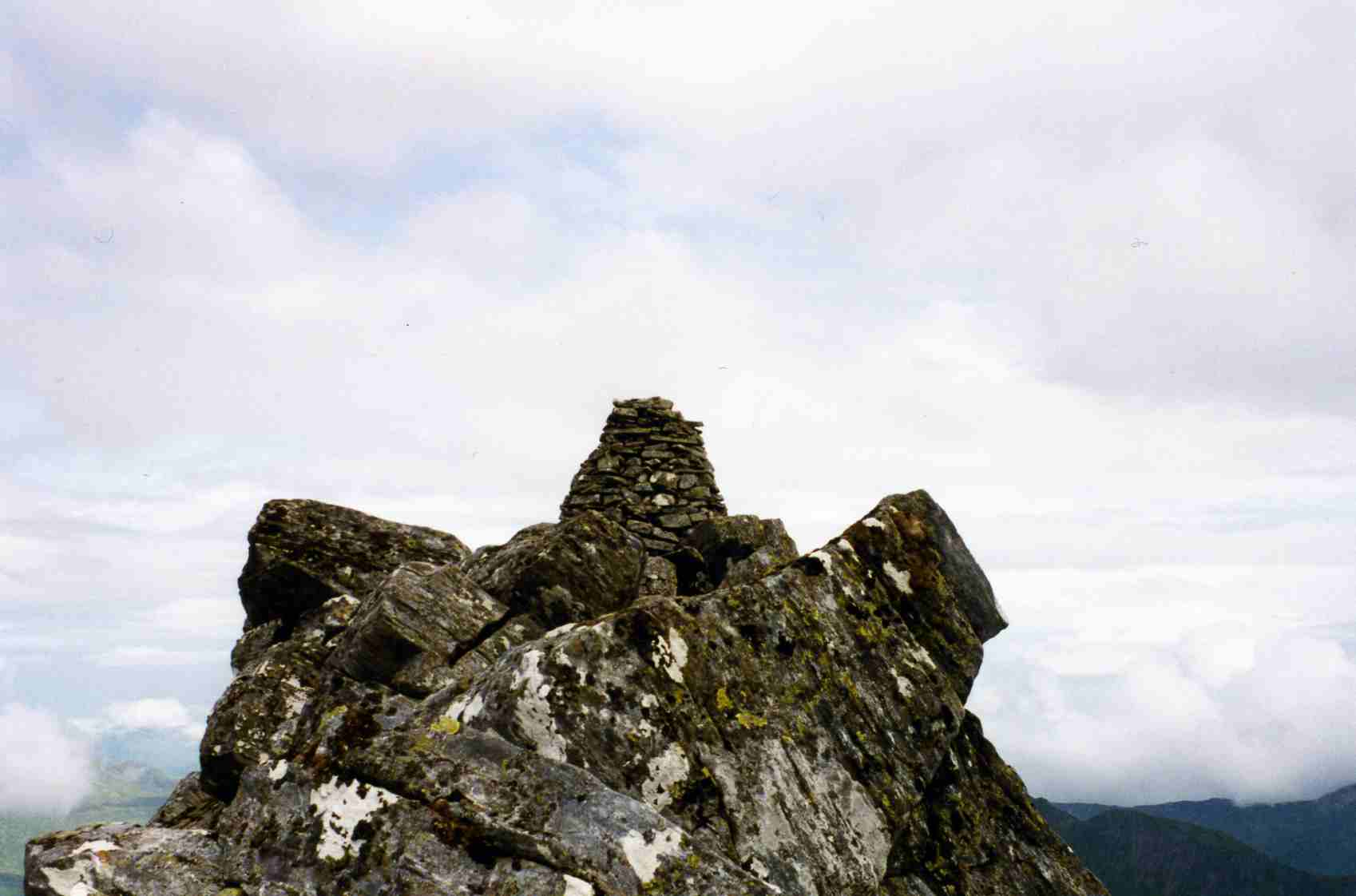
Approaching the summit cairn along the narrow NE ridge.

Sgùrr a' Bhealaich Dheirg (Scottish Gaelic for 'peak of the red gap') is a mountain in Kintail on the northern side of Glen Shiel in the Scottish Highlands. With a height of 1,036 metres (3,399 ft), it is classed as a Munro. It is the highest of three Munros (the others being Aonach Meadhoin and Sàileag) known as the "Brothers of Kintail" in contrast to the Five Sisters of Kintail which lie just to the west.

== Landscape ==
Sgùrr a' Bhealaich Dheirg is similar to the other Munros on the northern side of Glen Shiel in that it has extremely steep grassy slopes which descend into Glen Shiel, while to the north there are craggy coires and ridges. The southern flank of the mountain descends 850 metres in two kilometres to the valley floor: this steepness deters direct ascents of the mountain from the A87 road in the glen. There are also steepy grassy slopes to the east which descend to Coire nan Eun. The mountain is made up of four ridges. The main east–west ridge links with the adjoining Munros of Sàileag (west) and Aonach Meadhoin (east). There are two ridges which go northerly (north and north east) from the summit plateau and descend into the isolated country of the Kintail Forest.

Sgùrr a' Bhealaich Dheirg stands on the main east–west watershed of Scotland with drainage going to both coasts of the country. It has the distinction of having two sizable rivers rising from its northern corries. The River Croe which emerges from a small lochan called Loch a Glas Choire within the Glas Choire flows north west for 12 kilometres to join the sea at Loch Duich on the west coast. The River Affric rises in Coire nan Eun on the eastern flank of the mountain and flows some 80 kilometres to reach the east coast at the Beauly Firth. The steep southern slopes of the mountain are clothed in the trees of the Glenshiel Forest below the 450 metre contour.

== Climbing ==
As mentioned, the steepness of the southern slopes deter direct ascents of the mountain. It is possible to tackle the mountain from a starting point two kilometres west of the Cluanie Inn, going through the forest and ascending by a subsidiary ridge called Meall a’ Charra which joins the eastern ridge at the col with Aonach Meadhoin. The majority of visitors to the summit arrive along either the east or west ridges from the adjoining “Brothers” Munros. This traverse of all three mountains starts either at the Cluanie Inn to the east of the group, or from a parking place in Glen Shiel at grid reference NH009135 to the west. The starting and finishing point of this walk is several kilometres apart.

The highest point of Sgùrr a' Bhealaich Dheirg is situated off the main summit plateau, 80 metres along the narrow north east ridge, and features a dry stone wall leading toward it. The summit cairn is accessible via an easy scramble and commands views of the surrounding mountainous terrain to the north.
