= Sgùrr Mhic Bharraich =

Mountain in Scotland

Sgurr Mhic Bharraich
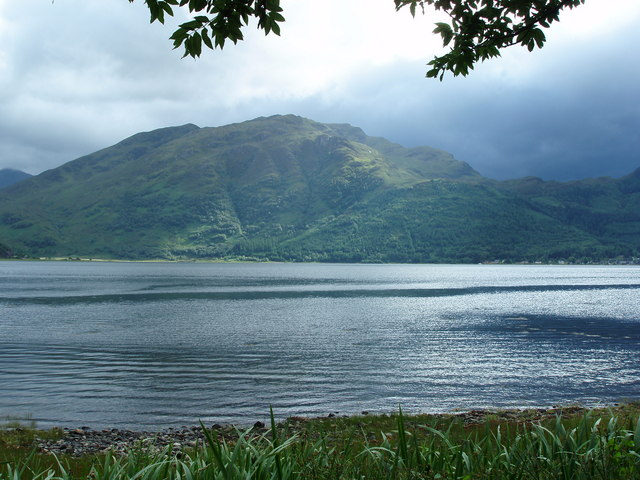
- Sgurr Mhic Bharraich from across Loch Duich

Highest point
- Elevation: 779 m (2,556 ft)
- Prominence: 317 m (1,040 ft)
- Listing: Corbett, Marilyn
- Coordinates: 57°12′00″N 5°26′57″W

Geography
- Location: Ross and Cromarty, Scotland
- Parent range: Northwest Highlands
- OS grid: NG917173
- Topo map: OS Landranger 33

Sgurr Mhic Bharraich (779 m) is a mountain in the Northwest Highlands, Scotland, at the head of Loch Duich in Ross-shire.

The mountain is the last peak on the south side of Glen Shiel, and is also quieter for climbers than many of its higher neighbours. The views from its summit are excellent.
