= Battle of Glen Shiel =

Battle of the Jacobite rising of 1719

- Part of the Jacobite rising of 1719
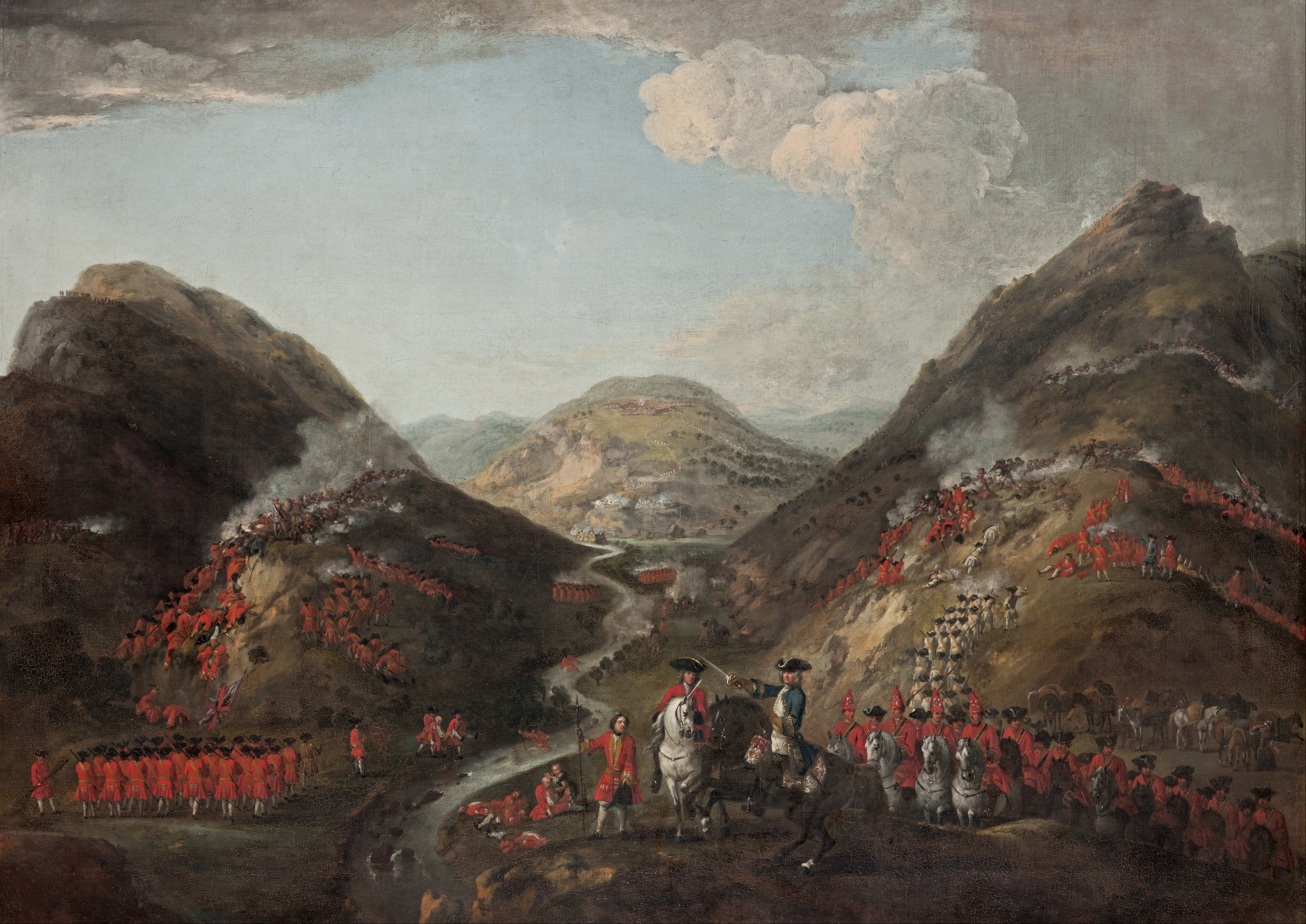
- 1719 painting of the battle
Date	10 June 1719
Location	Glen Shiel, Scotland 57°9′59″N 5°19′2″W
Result	Government victory

Belligerents
(Kingdom of Great Britain) British government Dutch Republic	Jacobites; Spain

Commanders and leaders
Joseph Wightman	William Murray; James Keith; Cameron of Lochiel; Nicolás Bolaño (surrendered)

Strength
c. 1,100	1,440

Casualties and losses
141 killed and wounded	c. 100 killed and wounded

Registered battlefield
- Designated: 21 March 2011
- Reference no.: BTL10
- Location within Scotland

The Battle of Glen Shiel, (Note: Scottish Gaelic: Blàr Ghleann Seile) 10 June 1719, was the decisive military engagement of the Jacobite rising of 1719. Fought near Glen Shiel in the Scottish Highlands, a Jacobite army composed of Highland levies and Spanish marines was defeated by British government troops.

The rebellion was backed by Spain, then engaged in the 1718–1720 War of the Quadruple Alliance with Britain. Originally intended only as a diversion for a landing in south-west England which was cancelled several weeks earlier, its failure was seen as having fatally damaged the Jacobite cause.

The battlefield is now included in the Inventory of Historic Battlefields in Scotland, and protected by Historic Scotland.

== Background ==
Under the terms of Peace of Utrecht that ended the War of the Spanish Succession in 1713, Spain lost Sicily and Sardinia. Their recovery was a priority for the Italian-born Spanish chief minister, Giulio Alberoni, who successfully reoccupied Sardinia in 1717. However, when Spanish troops landed on Sicily in July 1718, the Royal Navy destroyed their fleet at the Battle of Cape Passaro, beginning the War of the Quadruple Alliance.

To divert British resources from the Mediterranean, Alberoni planned to land 7,000 Spanish troops in South West England and restore James Stuart. Historians generally suggest this was more of a threat than a serious proposition. As one of the few contemporary statesmen with experience of amphibious operations, Alberoni knew the Royal Navy was unlikely to allow the Spanish fleet to reach England, let alone disembark large numbers of troops. When the Spanish fleet finally left Cádiz in March, a ferocious storm forced it into A Coruña, where it remained.

The plan included a simultaneous rising in Scotland to capture the port of Inverness, and allow a Swedish expeditionary force to disembark. Driven by Charles XII of Sweden's dispute with Hanover, it shows the complexity caused by its ruler George I also being British monarch. Charles died in November 1718, ending any hope of Swedish support, and thus the entire purpose of the Scottish uprising.

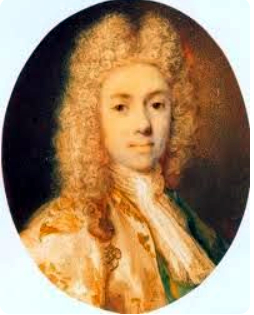
William Murray, Marquess of Tullibardine, Jacobite commander at Glen Shiel

In the end, only two frigates carrying George Keith and 300 Spanish marines reached the Isle of Lewis. Here they were joined by exiles from France, including the Earl of Seaforth, James Keith, the Marquess of Tullibardine, Lord George Murray and Cameron of Lochiel. When Tullibardine, who commanded Jacobite forces on land, learned of the failures elsewhere, he recommended retreat, which Keith prevented by ordering the Spanish ships to leave.

With no other option, the main force of some 1,000 Highlanders plus the Spanish troops prepared to march on Inverness, leaving their excess stores at Eilean Donan guarded by 40 Spaniards. On 10 May, a British naval squadron captured the castle, blocking any escape by sea, while Joseph Wightman's force of around 1,000 men with four Coehorn mortars advanced towards Glen Shiel. On 9 June, they reached Loch Cluanie, less than 8 miles (13 km) from the Jacobite camp. (Note: Order of Battle; Jacobite: 300 men of the Regiment Galicia from Spain, under its Colonel, Don Nicolás de Castro Bolaño, along with Brigadier Mackintosh of Borlum.; 150 men of the Clan Cameron, under their chief Cameron of Lochiel.; 150 men of Lidcoat's and 20 volunteers.; 40 men of Clan MacGregor, under Rob Roy MacGregor.; 50 men of Clan Mackinnon.; 200 men of Clan Mackenzie, under their William Mackenzie, 5th Earl of Seaforth, on the extreme left, up on the side of Scour Ouran, along with a rebel Brigadier Campbell.; 200 men of Clan Mackenzie, under Sir John Mackenzie of Coul.; 150 men of Clan Murray, under William Murray, Marquess of Tullibardine and his younger brother, Lord George Murray, positioned on the hill on the south bank of the river.; Men of the Clan Keith, under their chief, George Keith, 10th Earl Marischal.; Government Order of Battle; right wing under Colonel Clayton: 150 grenadiers under Major Milburn; Montagu's Regiment, Lieutenant Colonel Lawrence.; 50 men under Colonel Harrison.; Huffel's Dutch Regiment.; Three Independent Highland Companies from the Clan Fraser of Lovat, Clan Ross and Clan Sutherland; 80 men of the Clan Mackay, under their chief Ensign Mackay, Lord Strathnaver, on the flank.; Left wing, south side of the river, consisted of: Clayton's Regiment, commanded by Lieutenant Colonel Reading.; 100 men of the Independent Highland Company from the Clan Munro, under George Munro, 1st of Culcairn.; The Government dragoons and the four mortars remained on the road)

== Battle ==
Glenshiel campaign: key locations

John Henry Bastide, a subaltern in Montague's regiment who had a long career as a military engineer drew a detailed plan of the battlefield and the movements of the opposing forces soon after the battle. The section detailing the battle itself is missing but it is possible to reconstruct the main elements.

Tullibardine prepared a strong position near the Five Sisters hills, with the Spanish in the centre and the Highlanders on the flanks behind a series of trenches and barricades. Wightman's force arrived about 4:00 pm on 10 June and began the attack an hour later by firing their mortars at the Jacobite flanking positions. This caused few casualties but the Scots had not encountered mortars before, allowing four platoons of Clayton's and Munro's to advance up the hill to their lines, then use grenades to bomb them out of their positions.

Once the Jacobite right had been dislodged, Harrison and Montague attacked the Jacobite left under Lord Seaforth. This was strongly entrenched behind a group of rocks on the hillside but skilful use of the mortars forced Seaforth's men to give way while he himself was badly wounded. Commanded by Colonel Nicolas de Castro Bolaño, the Spanish in the centre stood their ground, but had to withdraw up the mountain as their flanks gave way.

The battle lasted until 9:00 pm; several accounts claim the heather caught fire and smoke combined with failing light enabled the bulk of the Scots to disappear into the night. The Spanish surrendered the next morning, meanwhile Lord George Murray, Seaforth and Tullibardine were wounded but the Jacobite leaders also managed to escape. An analysis by historian Peter Simpson attributes Wightman's victory to skilful use of mortars, the superior firepower of his grenadiers and the aggression shown by his infantry.

== Aftermath ==
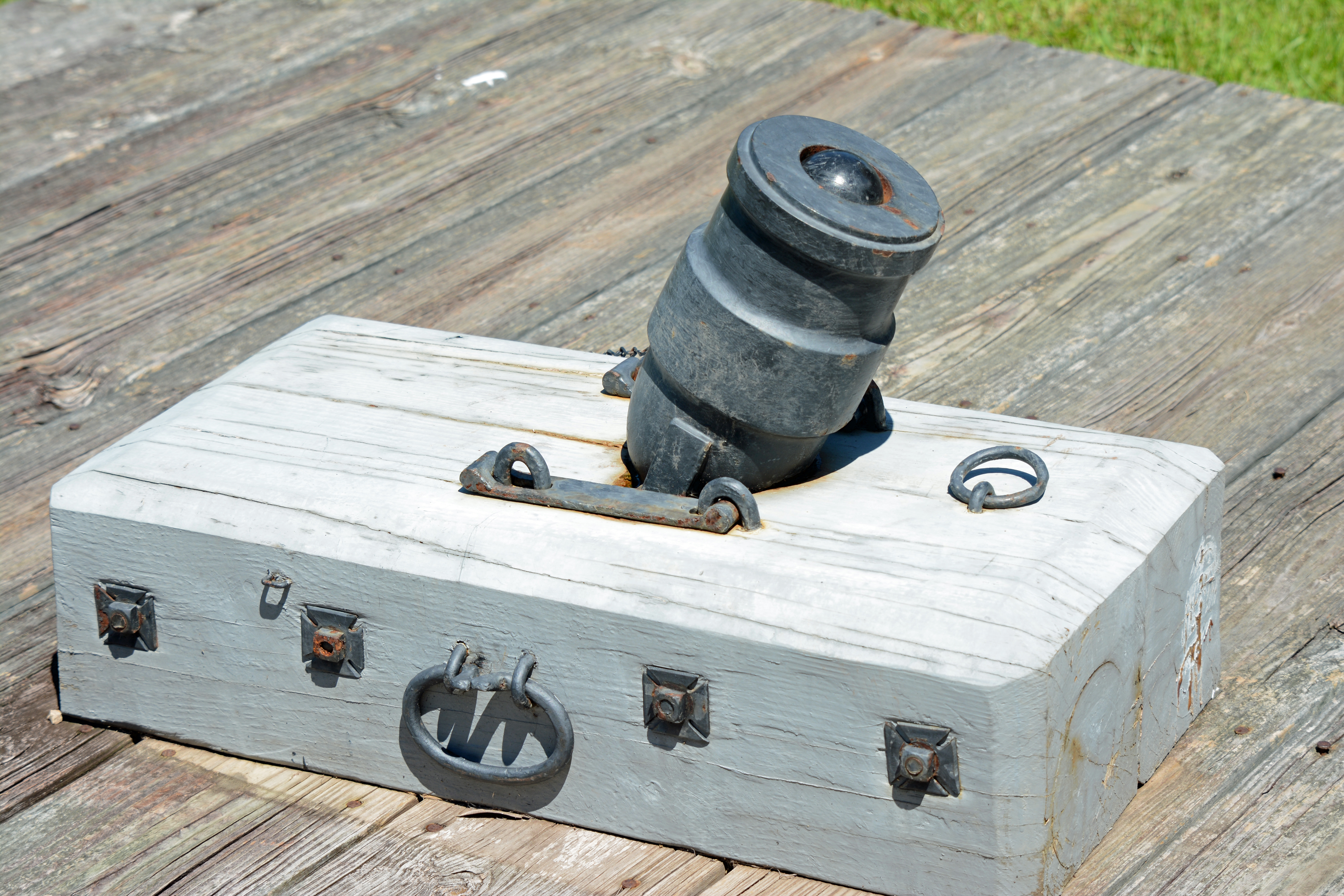
A replica of the Coehorn mortars used by Wightman's troops, a weapon the Highlanders had not previously encountered

Jacobite casualties were hard to estimate since few bodies were left on the field and most of the wounded escaped, among them Seaforth and Lord George Murray, while Wightman lost 21 killed and 120 wounded. Lord Carpenter, commander in Scotland, advised against pursuit, arguing the Rising had only damaged the Jacobite cause. Tullibardine concurred in his letter of 16 June 1719 to the Earl of Mar, in which he provides a description of the battle, and concludes "it bid fair to ruin the King's Interest and faithful subjects in these parts".

The captured Spanish regulars were sent to Edinburgh Castle where they were held for four months, before returning to Spain. In October 1719, a British naval expedition captured Vigo, held it for ten days, destroyed vast quantities of stores and equipment, then re-embarked with huge quantities of loot. This demonstration of naval power led to Alberoni's dismissal, and ended Spanish support for the Jacobites.

Senior Jacobites like Bolingbroke, Seaforth and Lord George Murray were allowed home, while others took service elsewhere. James Keith became a Prussian general, and was killed at Hochkirch in 1758. George Keith joined the Prussian diplomatic corps, did not participate in the 1745 Rising, and was ambassador to Spain from 1759 to 1761. Although pardoned by George III in 1763, he died in Potsdam in 1778.

Tullibardine remained in exile, took part in the 1745 Rising, and died in the Tower of London in July 1746. Lord George served as one of Prince Charles' senior commanders, and died in the Dutch Republic in October 1760.

== Battlefield today ==
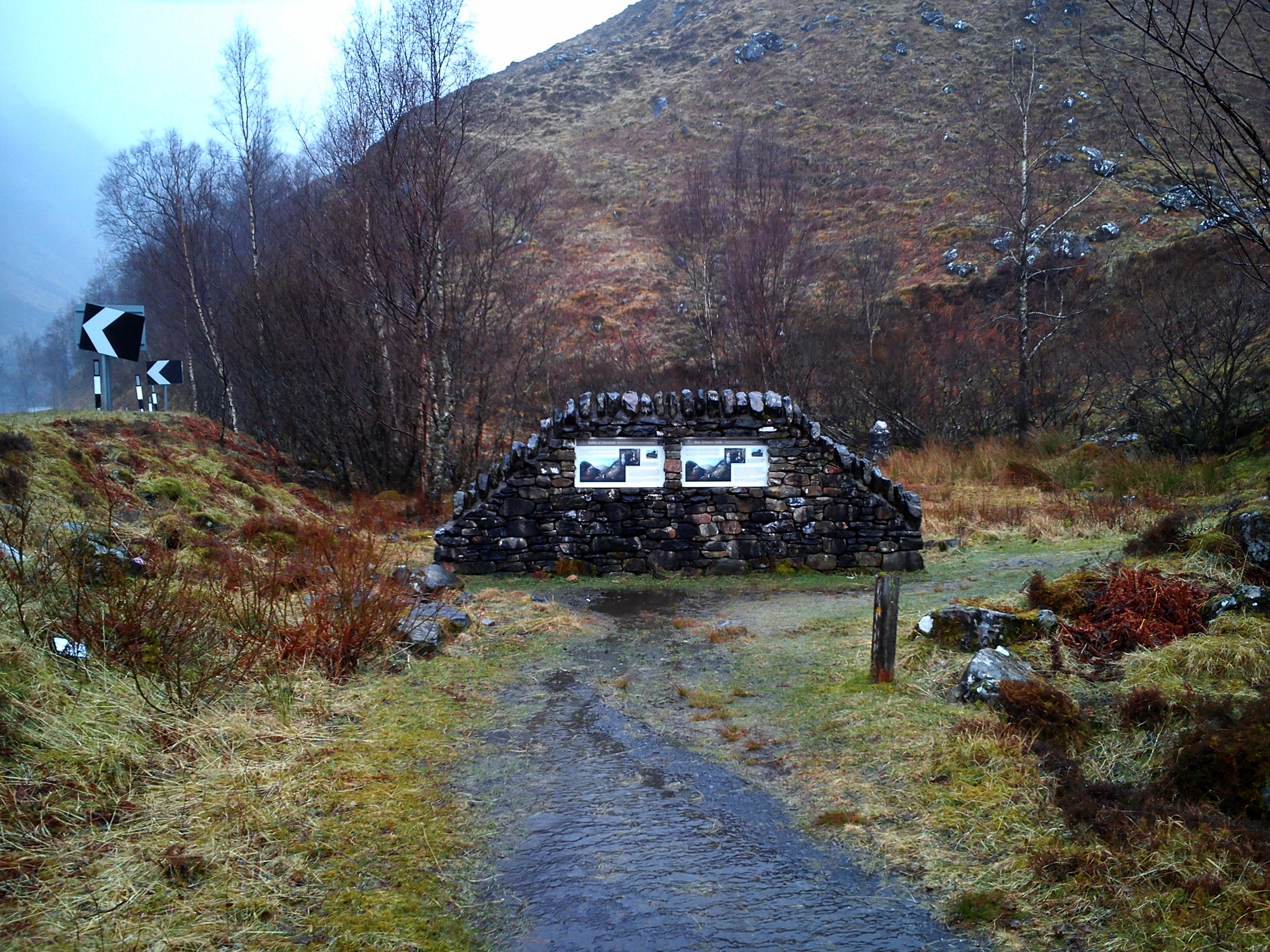
Battle of Glen Shiel Memorial

The mountain where the action was fought is called Sgurr na Ciste Duibhe; a subsidiary peak named Sgurr nan Spainteach, or 'Peak of the Spaniards', commemorates the Spanish marines. Now owned by the National Trust for Scotland, the stone breastworks built on the northern slope are a rare example of surviving fieldworks in Britain, and designated a scheduled monument.

In advance of the 300th anniversary of the battle, the National Trust for Scotland was involved in an archaeological survey of the site. Finds included ammunition from the mortars which were deployed against the Jacobite forces.

== Sources ==
- Black, Jeremy (2005). "Hanover and British Foreign Policy 1714–60". The English Historical Review. 120 (486): 303–339. doi:10.1093/ehr/cei117. JSTOR 3490922.
- Harcourt-Smith, Simon (1944). Cardinal of Spain: The Life and Strange Career of Alberoni. Knopf.
- Furgol, Edward (2006). "Keith, George, styled tenth Earl Marischal (1692/3?–1778)". Oxford Dictionary of National Biography (online ed.). Oxford University Press. doi:10.1093/ref:odnb/15265. (Subscription, Wikipedia Library access or UK public library membership required.)
- Lenman, Bruce (1980). The Jacobite Risings in Britain 1689–1746. Eyre Methuen. ISBN 0413396509.
- Historic Environment Scotland. "Battle of Glenshiel (BTL10)".
- Ormonde, James Butler (1895). Dickson, William Kirk (ed.). The Jacobite Attempt of 1719 Letters of James Butler, Second Duke of Ormonde (PDF) (2015 ed.). Sagwan Press. ISBN 978-1296882174.
- Pittock, Murray GH (2006). "Murray, Lord George". Oxford Dictionary of National Biography (online ed.). Oxford University Press. doi:10.1093/ref:odnb/19605. (Subscription, Wikipedia Library access or UK public library membership required.)
- Simms, Brendan (2007). Three Victories and a Defeat: The Rise and Fall of the First British Empire, 1714–1783. Penguin. ISBN 978-0140289848.
- Simpson, Peter (1996). The Independent Highland Companies; 1603–1760. John Donald. ISBN 085976432X.
- Jonathan Oates, "Dutch Forces in Eighteenth-Century Britain: A Perspective", Journal of the Society for Army Historical Research, Vol. 85, No. 341 (Spring 2007), pp. 20–39

== Bibliography ==
- Spiers, Edward M; Crang, Jeremy; Strickland, Matthew (2012). A Military History of Scotland. Edinburgh University Press Series. ISBN 9780748633357.
