= Sgùrr na Càrnach =

Mountain in Highland, Scotland

Coordinates: 57.1895°N 5.3483°W

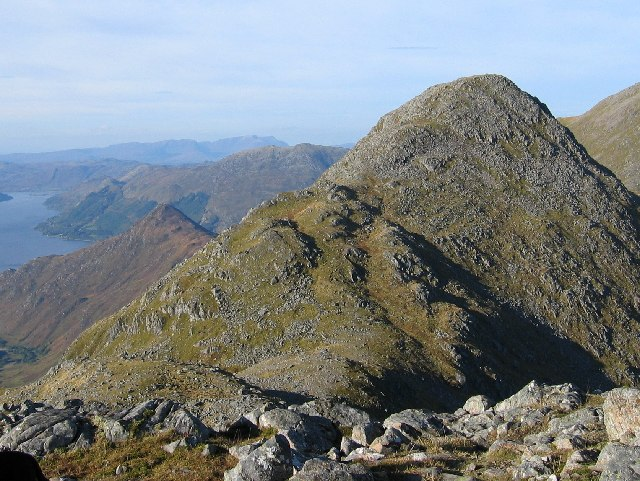
- Sgùrr na Càrnach from Sgùrr na Ciste Duibhe with Loch Duich in the background.

Highest point
- Elevation: 1,002 m (3,287 ft)
- Prominence: 134 m (440 ft)
- Listing: Munro

Naming
- English translation: peak of the stony place
- Language of name: Gaelic
- Pronunciation: Scottish Gaelic: [ˈs̪kuːrˠ nə ˈkʰaːrˠn̪ˠəx]

Geography
- Location: Kintail, Scotland
- Parent range: Northwest Highlands
- OS grid: NG977158
- Topo map: OS Landranger 33, OS Explorers 414

Sgùrr na Càrnach is a mountain in the Northwest Highlands of Scotland, one of the 'Five Sisters of Kintail'. It is on the northern side of Glen Shiel, 24 kilometres southeast of Kyle of Lochalsh. It reaches a height of 1,002 metres (3,287 ft) and is classed as a Munro. The summit is rough and boulder-ridden, living up to its Gaelic name which means "peak of the stony place".

From 1891 to 1997 Sgùrr na Càrnach was ranked as just a "Top" of the nearby Munro of Sgùrr Fhuraran and was not given separate Munro status, however in the 1997 revision of the tables by the Scottish Mountaineering Club, the mountain was elevated to the Munro category as it was decided that with 134 metres of topographic prominence it had the required characteristics of a separate mountain.

Sgùrr na Càrnach has extremely steep slopes to the east and west, the western slopes descend sharply to Glen Shiel while to the east the mountain falls precipitously into Coire Domhain. The mountain has a main north to south ridge which connects to Sgùrr Fhuraran (north) and Sgùrr na Ciste Duibhe (south). There is a minor north western ridge which descends sharply to Glen Shiel, however this is rarely used as a means of ascent because of difficulties crossing the River Shiel in the valley and of the unremitting steepness of the ridge itself.

Because of Sgùrr na Càrnach's central position of the three Munros which make up the Five Sisters of Kintail it is invariably approached along the ridge from either Sgùrr Fhuraran or Sgùrr na Ciste Duibhe as walkers complete the full Five Sisters ridge walk. A direct ascent is possible, as mentioned, up the north west ridge. The best starting place for this direct ascent is Achnangart Farm (grid reference NG963148) where there is parking space in an old quarry, a direct ascent up the hillside should not be attempted as there are steep crags higher up. The walker should walk 1.5 km north to the base of the NW ridge and ascend steeply but safely from there. The most common ascent starts further up the Glen (NH009135) and climbs to the Bealach na Lapain before crossing Sgùrr na Ciste Duibhe to reach Sgùrr na Càrnach. The view from the top of the mountain gives a fine end on view of Loch Duich to the north and an aerial prospect down into Coire Domhain to the east.

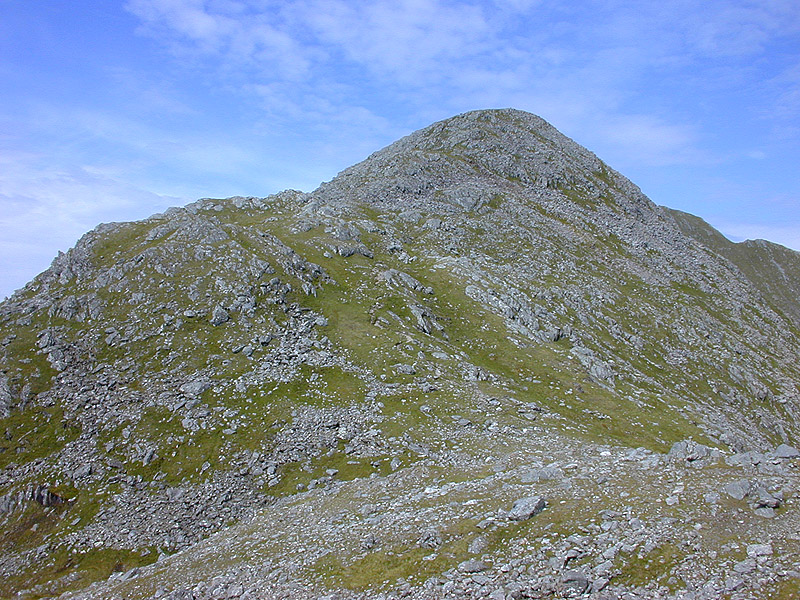
Sgùrr na Càrnach from the southern ridge
