= Sàileag =

Mountain in Scotland

Coordinates: 57.18°N 5.281°W

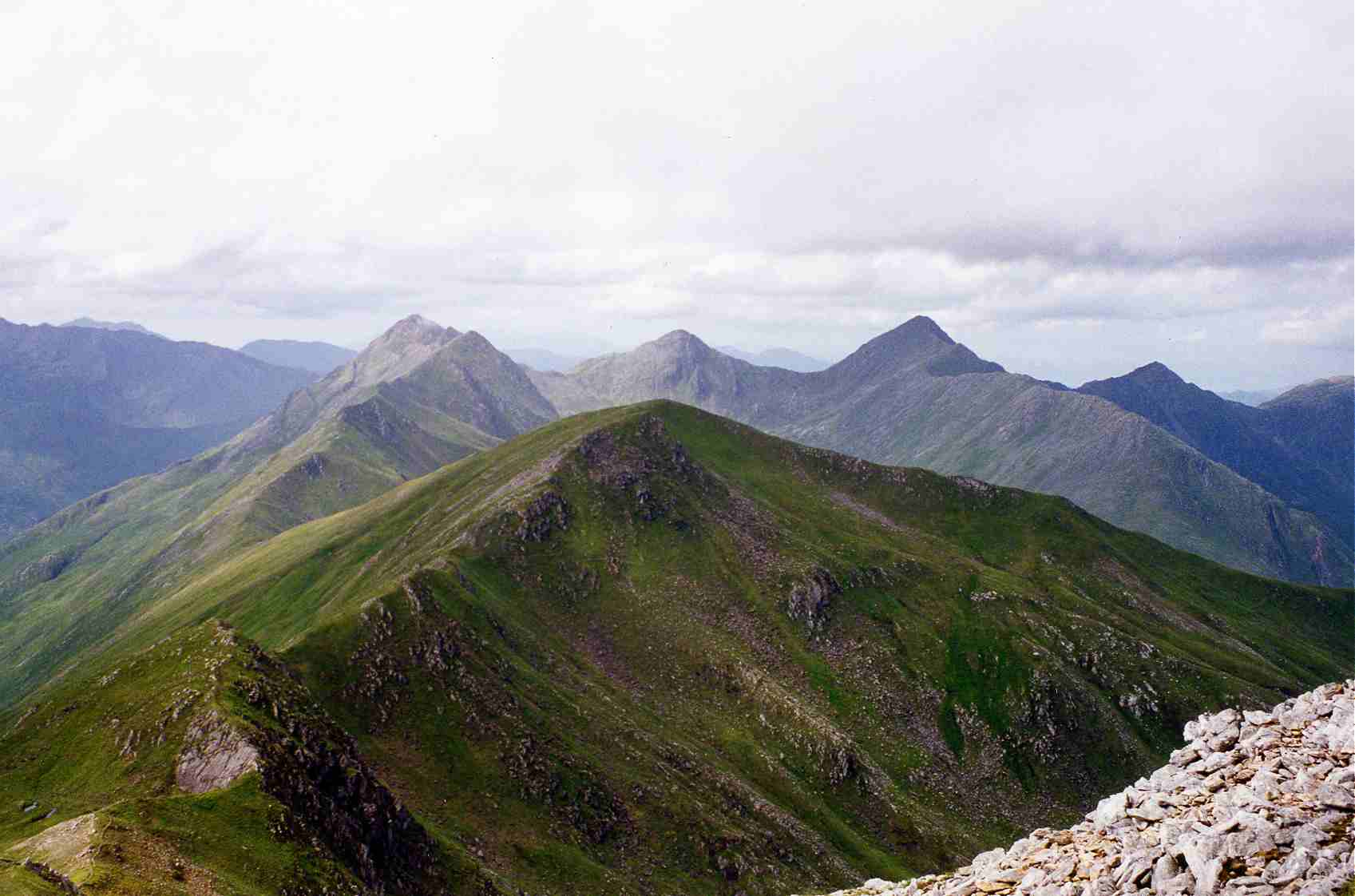
- Sàileag with the Five Sisters of Kintail behind seen from Sgurr a' Bhealaich Dheirg.

Highest point
- Elevation: 956 m (3,136 ft)
- Prominence: c. 91 m
- Listing: Munro

Naming
- English translation: The Little Heel
- Language of name: Gaelic
- Pronunciation: Scottish Gaelic: [ˈs̪aːlak]

Geography
- Location: Glen Shiel, Scotland
- Parent range: Northwest Highlands
- OS grid: NH017148
- Topo map: OS Landranger 33, OS Explorer 414

Sàileag is Scottish mountain located on the northern side of Glen Shiel, 27 kilometres south east of Kyle of Lochalsh.

== Overview ==
It lies just to the east of the famous Five Sisters of Kintail group of hills to which it is connected by the Bealach an Lapain (725 metres). It is part of a mountain group called the North Glen Shiel Ridge which also includes two other Munros (Sgurr a' Bhealaich Dheirg and Aonach Meadhoin) and with a height of 956 metres (3136 feet) it is the lowest of all the six Munros on the northern side of Glen Shiel, making the mountain's translated name of “The Little Heel” quite appropriate. Sàileag seems to have lost three metres of height in recent years, many older guide books have its height as 959 metres in comparison to 956 on the newer Ordnance Survey maps.

== Topography ==
Sàileag is mostly grassy although its north west face is steep and craggy as it drops to the Allt an Lapain. The mountain is formed by the junction of three ridges, the eastern ridge connects to the neighbouring Munro of Sgurr a’ Bhealaich Dheirg while the western ridge connects to Sgurr na Ciste Dhuibhe, the most easterly Munro of the Five Sisters of Kintail. The northern ridge is rocky and descends to the head of Gleann Lichd where it connects with the lower slopes of Beinn Fhada. Sàileag's southern slopes which drop to the A87 road in Glen Shiel are clothed in the trees of the Glenshiel Forest below the 500 metre contour, these southern slopes have a reputation of being some the most uniformly steep in Scotland. A traveller going down Glen Shiel in 1803 commented of the slope, "an inclined wall, of such inaccessible height that no living creature would venture to scale it".

== Ascents ==
The most common starting place for the ascent of Sàileag is the car park on the A87 road at grid reference NH008135 where there is a considerable gap in the trees which allows easy access to the mountainside. The climb to the top of the Bealach an Lapain is steep and unrelenting on grassy slopes. From the Bealach it is a further 230 metres of ascent east to reach the summit. The highlight of the view is a fine vista of the Five Sisters of Kintail and a good aerial view down Gleann Lichd. An ascent of Sàileag is invariably combined with some or all of the other six Munros on the northern side of Glen Shiel.
