= Joseph Wightman (British Army officer) =

British army officer (1665–1722)

Major-General Joseph Wightman
- Portrait by Peter Tillemans, 1719
- Born: c. 1665; England
- Died: 25 September 1722 (aged 56–57); Bath, Somerset
- Military career
- Allegiance: England; Great Britain
- Branch: English Army; British Army
- Service years: 1690–1722
- Rank: Major general
- Unit: 1st Foot Guards
- Commands: Joseph Wightman's Regiment of Foot
- Conflicts: Nine Years' War; Battle of Landen; Siege of Namur (1695); War of the Spanish Succession; Assault on Nijmegen (1702); Siege of Venlo (1702); Siege of Roermond (1702); Siege of Huy (1703); Siege of Limburg; Battle of Almansa; Jacobite rising of 1715; Battle of Sheriffmuir; Jacobite rising of 1719; Battle of Glen Shiel

Major-General Joseph Wightman (c. 1665 – 25 September 1722) was a British army officer who served in the Nine Years' War and War of the Spanish Succession. He is best known for participating in the suppression of the Jacobite risings of 1715 and 1719.

== Early life and Nine Years' War ==
Joseph Wightman was born in c. 1665 and was commissioned into the English Army's 1st Regiment of Foot Guards on 28 December 1690 at the rank of ensign. He was deployed to Flanders with his regiment during the Nine Years' War and on 29 July 1693 fought in the Battle of Landen. Wightman was promoted to lieutenant on 7 August 1693. In May 1695 his regiment was serving in West Flanders under the Austrian field marshal Charles Thomas, Prince of Vaudémont and on 11 August Wightman's regiment arrived to participate in the siege of Namur. Wightman participated in an assault on Namur along with the rest of his regiment on 30 August before going into winter quarters in Bruges. The regiment saw no service in 1696, during which Wightman was promoted to captain on 8 December, and returned to England following the 1697 Peace of Ryswick. He transferred to Sir Matthew Bridges's Regiment of Foot, then ranked as the 17th Regiment of Foot.

== War of the Spanish Succession ==
Following the outbreak of the War of the Spanish Succession in March 1701 Wightman's regiment embarked on troopships at Cork on 15 June and sailed to the Dutch Republic where it garrisoned Gorinchem. On 10 March 1702 the regiment began marching to Roosendaal; it subsequently went to the Duchy of Cleves. On 10 June Wightman fought in the assault on Nijmegen and in September served in the sieges of Venlo and Roermond; he was promoted to lieutenant colonel in that year. In 1703 his regiment covered the sieges of Huy and Limburg, and Wightman was promoted to brevet colonel on 26 August.

Wightman's military performance impressed his superiors, and he was described by the Duke of Marlborough as "a very careful, diligent officer". The regiment sailed from the Dutch Republic to Portsmouth in October and after its arrival was sent to Portugal, landing there on 15 March 1704. Wightman was promoted to brigadier general on 1 January 1707, served in the Battle of Almansa on 25 April and was appointed as colonel of his regiment on 20 August following Blood's death the day earlier.

== Jacobite risings and death ==
Wightman was promoted to major general on 1 January 1710 and appointed as the acting Commander-in-Chief, Scotland on 13 July 1712 in the absence of Lieutenant-general John Campbell, 2nd Duke of Argyll. He obtained the appointment through the influence of General John Richmond Webb in spite of the opposition of Argyll, who intended to nominate Brigadier-general William Breton to the post. As Commander-in-Chief, Scotland, Wightman faced several difficulties. He had a poor relationship with Argyll, who allegedly never replied to his letters, and Wightman found the Scottish public to be generally pro-Jacobite and hostile to the presence of English troops. To avoid offending Presbyterians Wightman ordered his chaplain to stop using the Book of Common Prayer in regimental services.

Argyll was in England when the Jacobite rising of 1715 broke out in Scotland in August of that year. Wightman mustered 1,800 troops and joined Argyll when he returned from London in mid-September. On 13 November Wightman served under Argyll at the Battle of Sheriffmuir and commanded the centre of the government army, which comprised three infantry regiments. In this role Wightman supported Argyll who used the government cavalry on the right flank to rout the Jacobite left flank. Wightman wrote an account of the battle on 14 November which was included in the chaplain Robert Patten's 1717 pro-Hanoverian work A History of the late Rebellion. The same account was republished and denounced in Robert Campbell's 1745 work Life of John, duke of Argyle and Greenwich. Though the battle was tactically inconclusive it was a strategic government victory and the rebellion was suppressed by 1716.

In 1719 Wightman was stationed in Inverness when the Jacobite rising of 1719 began after Jacobite rebels under William Murray, Marquess of Tullibardine landed at Loch Alsh. On 10 June, Wightman commanded a government army which defeated the rebels and their Spanish allies at the Battle of Glen Shiel, which ended the rebellion. He was rewarded for his successes by being appointed the governor of Kinsale but died of apoplexy at Bath, Somerset on 25 September 1722 before he could take up the post. Administration over Wightman's estate was granted to his widow Eliza. She died shortly after her husband, and household goods owned by Eliza were auctioned off at the Wightmans' London residence on Great Marlborough Street on 26 April 1723.

== Bibliography ==
- Tony Jaques. Dictionary of Battles and Sieges: F-O. Greenwood Publishing, 2017.
- Jonathan Oates. The Last Battle on English Soil, Preston 1715. Routledge, 2016.
- Stuart Reid. Sheriffmuir 1715. Frontline Books, 2014.
