= Sgùrr na Ciste Duibhe =

Mountain in the Scottish Highlands

Coordinates: 57.18°N 5.3363°W

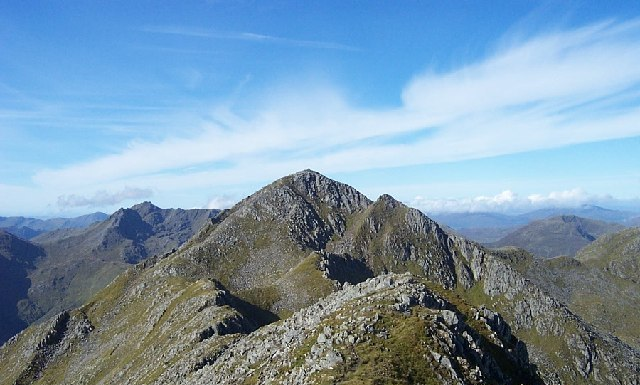
- Sgùrr na Ciste Duibhe from the east

Highest point
- Elevation: 1,027 m (3,369 ft)
- Prominence: 178 m (584 ft)
- Listing: Munro, Marilyn

Naming
- English translation: peak of the black chest or coffin
- Language of name: Gaelic
- Pronunciation: [ˈs̪kuːrˠ nə ˈkʰʲiʃtʲə ˈt̪ɯjə]

Geography
- Location: Kintail, Scotland
- Parent range: Northwest Highlands
- OS grid: NG984149
- Topo map: OS Landranger 33, OS Explorer 414

Listed summits of Sgùrr na Ciste Duibhe
Name	Grid ref	Height	Status
Sgùrr nan Spainteach	NG991150	990 m (3248 ft)	Munro Top

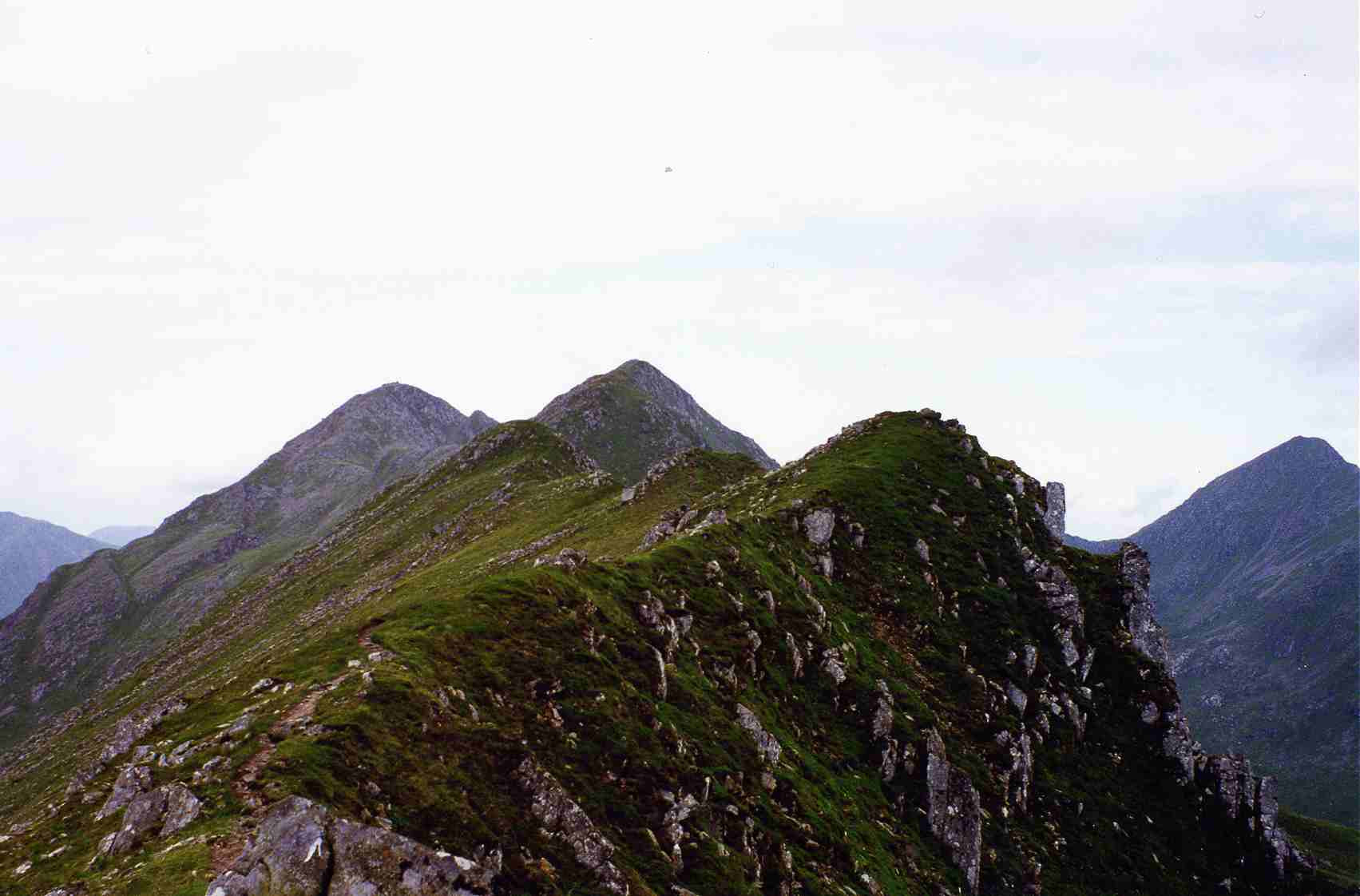
Looking along the ridge towards Sgùrr na Ciste Duibhe from the Bealach an Lapain.

Sgùrr na Ciste Duibhe or Sgùrr nan Cisteachan Dubha is a mountain in the Northwest Highlands of Scotland, one of the 'Five Sisters of Kintail'. It is on the northern side of Glen Shiel, 27 kilometers southeast of Kyle of Lochalsh. Its height is 1,027 metres (3,369 ft) and it is classed as a Munro.

== Name ==
The Gaelic name Sgùrr na Ciste Duibhe means "peak of the black chest or coffin"; the alternative name Sgùrr nan Cisteachan Dubha being "peak of the black chests/coffins". The origin of the name is unclear but is thought to refer to an unusual deep rocky hollow near the summit which lies between the main ridge and a false crest. This can be dangerous in mist or snow conditions. Other sources say that the name refers to the deep hollow of the Allt Dearg on the southwest slope. The mountain should not be confused with another Munro called Ciste Dhubh which lies just 7 km to the east.

== Landscape and history ==
Sgùrr na Ciste Duibhe's south face is one of the steepest and highest grassy mountainsides in Scotland as it drops almost 1000 metres in a distance of 1.5 kilometres to the valley bottom in Glen Shiel. The average angle of this hillside is 34 degrees, with a maximum of around 40 degrees. The mountain's northern flank falls in crags into Coire Domhain (Deep Corrie) while to the west a ridge connects to the adjoining Munro of Sgùrr na Carnach. The ridge continues to the east going down to the Bealach an Lapain (The Easy Pass) before climbing to the adjacent Munro of Sàileag.

Sgùrr na Ciste Duibhe has a subsidiary Top on this east ridge, listed in the Munros Tables, Sgùrr nan Spainteach (Peak of the Spaniards) (990 metres). The peak's unusual name derives from the Battle of Glen Shiel which took place on the southern slopes of the mountain in 1719. 300 Spanish troops fought a brave rearguard action in the battle on the side of the defeated Jacobite rebels and the peak was named by locals in their honour. The steep south west slopes of Sgùrr na Ciste Duibhe have a large boulder lying on them known as "Prince Charlie's Stone", this is where Bonnie Prince Charlie spent a red hot day in the summer of 1746 hiding from government troops. At the time he had a £30,000 bounty on his head after fleeing after the Battle of Culloden.

The summit of Sgùrr na Ciste Duibhe is remarkable in having slipped down by 5–10 metres from the Glen Shiel Fault, which runs just behind it on the north-east. The fault trace cuts the east ridge at the awkward 'bad step' and crosses the north shoulder at the "Red Top", these outcrops being linked by a fretted crest. Route-finding along the Five Sisters ridge can thus be difficult in mist and snow. The slippage has also created dangerous fissures up to 10 metres deep on the upper south face, including the eponymous 'black chest'. Part of the slippage collapsed, probably 10,000 years ago, leaving a long cavity scar, creating the knoll for the 1719 battle, and temporarily damming the river which has cut through it at the defile of the Pass of Glen Shiel

== Climbing ==
The direct ascent of Sgùrr na Ciste Duibhe begins at a parking place at (NH009135) on the A87 main road in Glen Shiel. It is a steep ascent up the hillside to the Bealach an Lapain where the eastern ridge of the mountain is then followed to the summit. This walk can be continued north west to take in the other peaks of the Five Sisters ridge, finishing eight kilometres from the starting point on the shores of Loch Duich. The summit is marked by a large cairn and gives extensive views.
