= Sgùrr Fhuaran =

Mountain in Scotland

Coordinates: 57.1964°N 5.3462°W

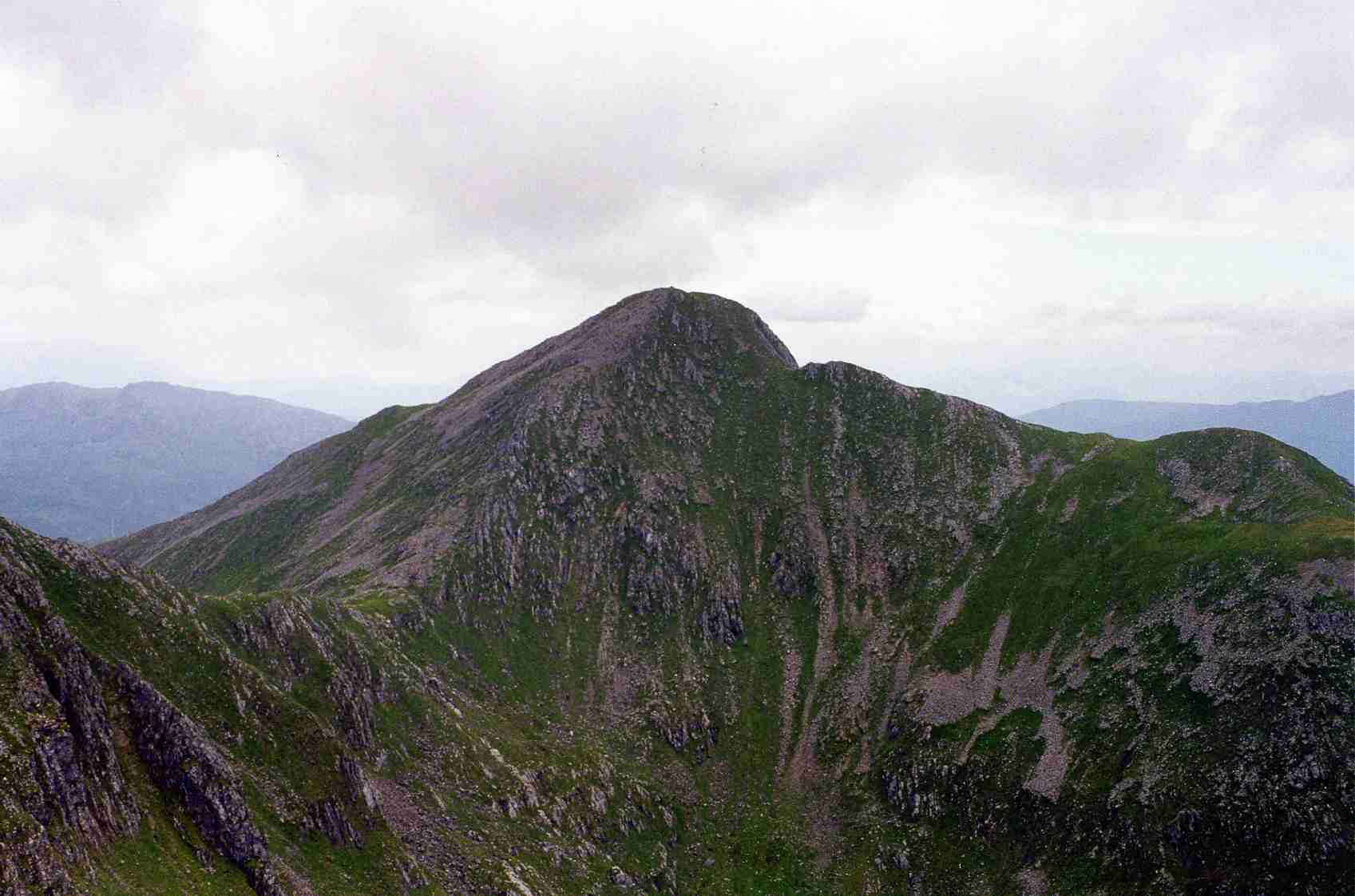
- Sgùrr Fhuaran seen from Sgùrr na Ciste Duibhe across Coire Domhain

Highest point
- Elevation: 1,067 m (3,501 ft)
- Prominence: 663 m (2,175 ft)
- Parent peak: A' Chralaig
- Listing: Munro, Marilyn

Naming
- English translation: Obscure; peak of wells/fountains, Odhran's peak or wolf's peak
- Language of name: Gaelic
- Pronunciation: Scottish Gaelic: [s̪kuːrˠ ˈuəɾən]

Geography
- Location: Kintail, Scotland
- Parent range: Northwest Highlands
- OS grid: NG978166
- Topo map: OS Landranger 33, OS Explorers 414

Listed summits of Sgùrr Fhuaran
Name	Grid ref	Height	Status
Sgùrr na Saighead	NG974177	929 m (3,047 ft)	Munro Top

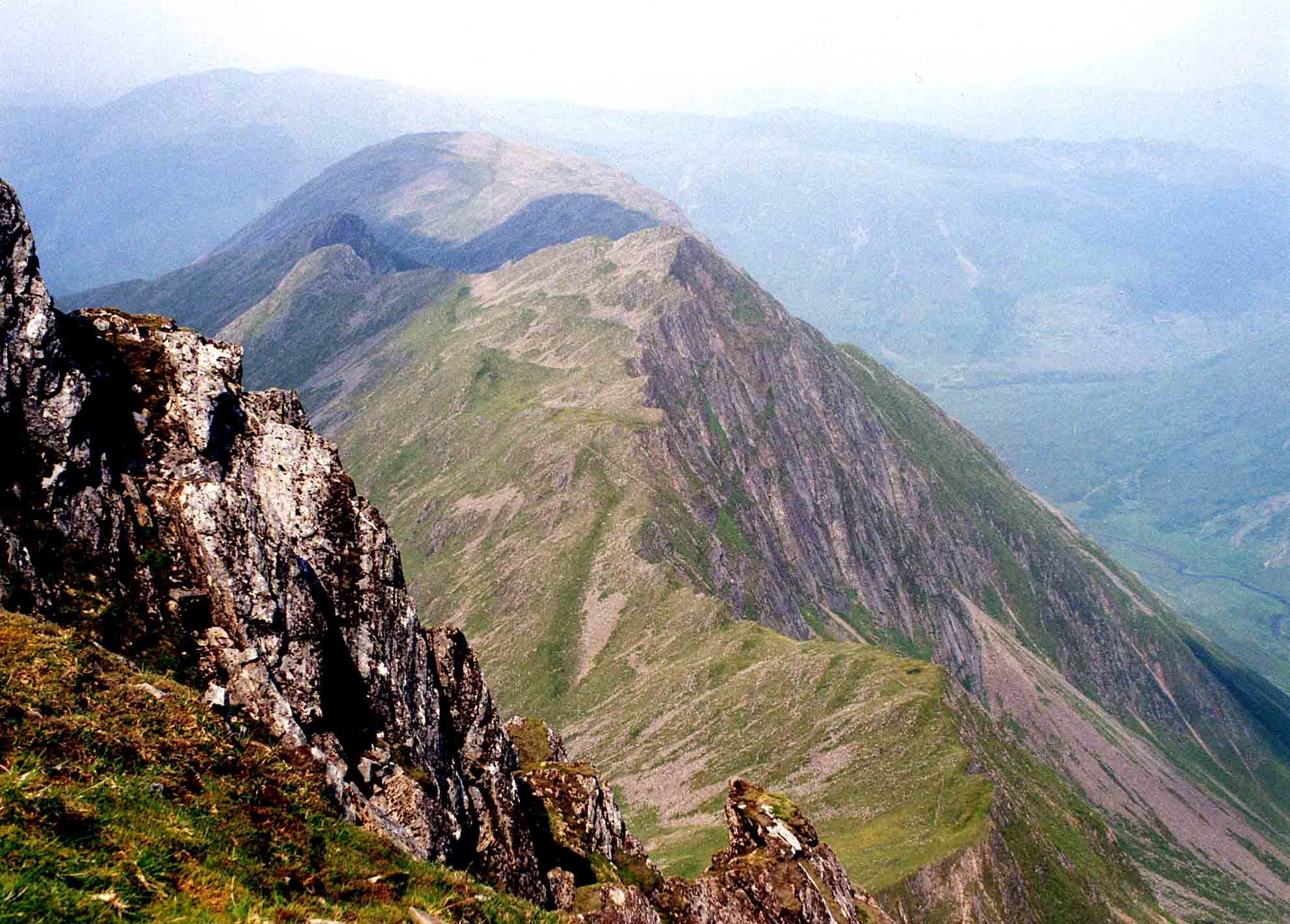
The view along the north ridge from the summit to the Munro "Top" of Sgùrr na Saighead.

Sgùrr Fhuaran is a Scottish mountain that is situated on the northern side of Glen Shiel, 23 kilometres (14 mi) east-southeast of Kyle of Lochalsh.

== Overview ==
The mountain reaches a height of 1,067 metres (3,501 ft) and qualifies as a Munro and a Marilyn; it is the highest point for a significant distance, having a sizeable topographic prominence of 663 metres (2,175 ft) and giving extensive views from its summit.

The meaning of the mountain’s name is obscure. Sgùrr Fhuaran may mean "Peak of wells or springs" and many streams issue from the mountains slopes. Other possible meanings proposed are that the proper name is Sgùrr Urain, the Peak of Odhran, named after a disciple of Columba, or that the second part of the name derives from "odhran-choin", here meaning "wolf". The mountain is referred to in the war cry or heraldic slogan "Sgùrr Uaran" of Clan Macrae, which occupied lands in the Kintail area.

== Geography ==
Sgùrr Fhuaran is one of three mountains that make up the Five Sisters of Kintail (the other two being Sgùrr na Ciste Duibhe and Sgùrr na Càrnach) and when seen from Màm Ratagan above Loch Duich, the Five Sisters are one of the best known views in the Western Highlands of Scotland. The legend of the Five Sisters of Kintail tells the story of seven sisters, daughters of a local farmer, two of whom married visiting brothers who said they would send their five other brothers for the remaining five sisters to wed. However, no one returned and the five remaining sisters agreed for a local wizard to transform them into peaks in order to preserve their beauty while they waited.

Sgùrr Fhuaran is a distinctive peak with steep slopes which drop away to Glen Shiel on its western flank at an angle of over 30 degrees giving the mountain a feeling of great height. It has four main ridges, the best known of these is the WNW ridge which is conspicuous in views from Glen Shiel, it drops away precipitously from the summit to descend 1,000 metres (3,300 ft) in just over two kilometres (1 1/4 miles) to the River Shiel in the valley. The southern ridge connects to the adjoining Munro of Sgùrr na Càrnach, which lies one kilometre (5/8 mi) away.

The eastern ridge which is a narrow knife edge in places gives a dramatic ascent route from Glenlicht House at the head of the remote Gleann Lichd. Between the southern and eastern ridges lies the impressive Coire Domhain to which the mountain drops almost vertically. The northern ridge goes to the Munro “top” of Sgùrr na Saighead (Peak of the Arrows) which with a height of 929 metres (3,048 ft) lies one kilometre (5/8 mi) away from the main summit. It is one of the Five Sisters and regarded by many as the finest, being narrow and exposed. This northern ridge continues for a further four kilometres (two miles) to reach sea level at the shores of Loch Duich.

== Ascents ==
The direct ascent of Sgùrr Fhuaran starts at sea level at the foot of Glen Shiel (grid reference NG946179): before the A87 crosses the Shiel bridge, a grass path on the north side of the river and loch Shiel leads to the remains of a footbridge and an unrelenting steep climb up the WNW ridge. A more interesting variation takes in Sgùrr na Saighead on the way and then follows the north ridge to the main summit. The full traverse of the Five Sisters ridge is rated by mountain writers as among the best walks in Scotland, the only problem with which lies with transport between the starting and finishing points of the walk, eight kilometres (five miles) apart. The best solution to this is to start at Morvich in Strath Croe (NG960211) and walk up Gleann Lichd to its head, before ascending to walk the ridge south to north, finishing at the shores of Loch Duich near the day's starting point.
