= Kintail =

Mountainous area in the Scottish highlands

Kintail National Scenic Area
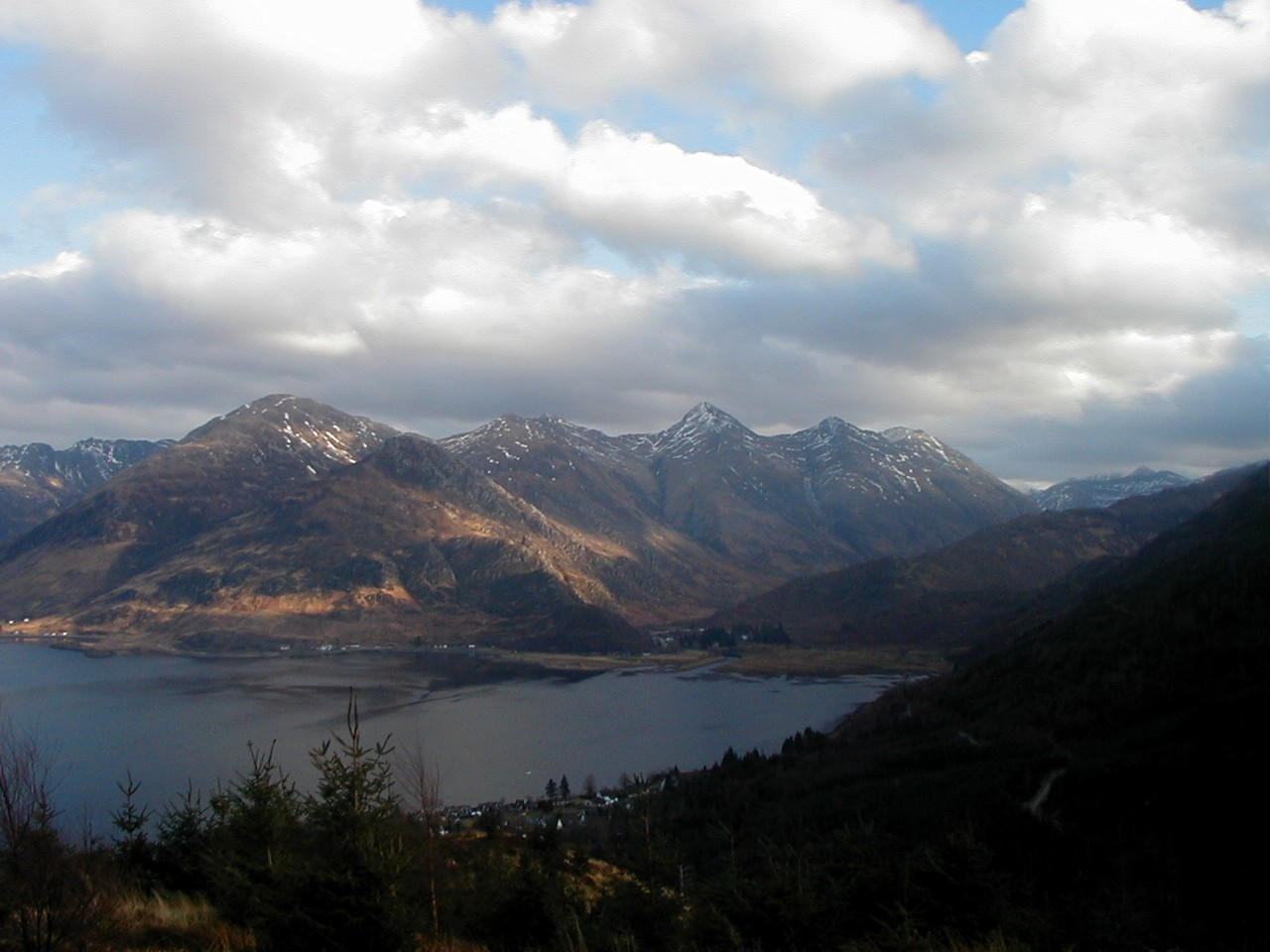
- Five Sisters of Kintail from Màm Ratagan

- Location within Highland
- Location: Highland, Scotland
- Coordinates: 57°12′21″N 5°21′8″W
- Area: 66 sq mi (170 km^{2})
- Established: 1981
- Governing body: NatureScot

Kintail (Scottish Gaelic: Cinn t-Sàile) is a mountainous area sitting at the head of Loch Duich in the Northwest Highlands of Scotland, located in the Highland Council area.

== Name ==
The area is called Cinn t-Sàile in Scottish Gaelic – which, since the "s" is silent, is anglicised as Kintail – and literally translates as the Head (ie end) of the Salt Water/Sea, describing very literally the area sitting at the head/end of Loch Duich (a long fjord-like sea loch).

== Area Overview ==
Kintail is the area inland (east) from the head (end) of Loch Duich. It consists of the mountains to the north of Glen Shiel and the A87 road between the heads of Loch Duich and Loch Cluanie; its boundaries, other than Glen Shiel, are generally taken to be the valleys of Strath Croe and Gleann Gaorsaic to the north and An Caorann Mòr to the east. Although close to the west coast the mountains lie on the main east–west watershed of Scotland, as the northern side of Kintail drains via Glen Affric to the east coast.

The main settlement within Kintail is Morvich, located to the northwest of the mountains, just off the A87 road. Morvich serves as the location of the base for Kintail Mountain Rescue Team, as well a campsite operated by The Caravan Club.

== Kintail National Scenic Area ==
Kintail gives its name to the Kintail National Scenic Area, one of the forty national scenic areas in Scotland, which are defined so as to identify areas of exceptional scenery and to ensure its protection from inappropriate development. The designated area includes the mountains of Kintail proper, as well as the southern side of Glen Shiel from the site of the Battle of Glen Shiel west to the shores of Loch Duich, and extends west to as far as Dornie on the north shore of Loch Duich. The designated area covers 42,380 acres (17,150 ha) in total, of which 39,700 acres (16,100 ha) is on land, with a further 2,670 acres (1,080 ha) being marine (i.e. below low tide level), consisting of the sea loch of Loch Duich. The area is considered to encapsulate the scenery of the west highlands, being composed of ridges and peaks that rise steeply from narrow glens and the sea.

== Mountains ==
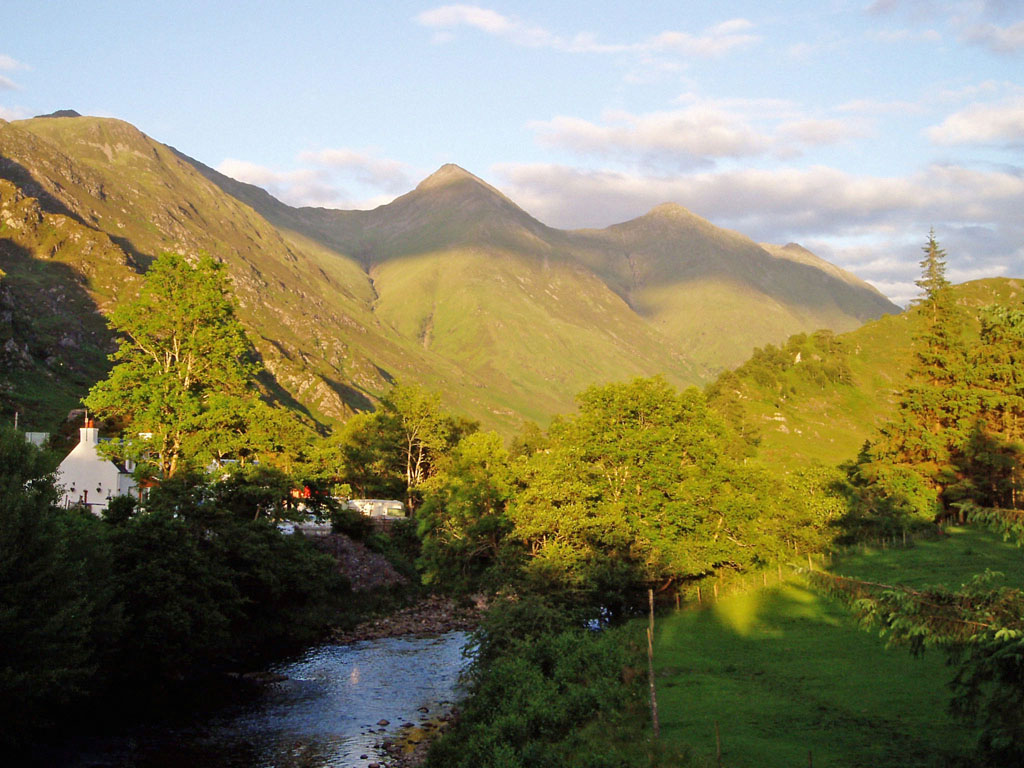
Four of the Five Sisters of Kintail from Shiel Bridge

The hills to the north-east of Glen Shiel are known as the Five Sisters Of Kintail (Gaelic: Còig Peathraichean Chinn Tàile, although the name is not derived from the Gaelic), and form a high ridge some five miles (eight kilometres) long rising steeply from Glen Shiel to a maximum height of 1,067 metres (3,501 ft). According to legend, the five sisters are the oldest of seven sisters, as the youngest two sisters fell in love with two Irish princes who washed ashore during a storm. Their father would only allow them to marry once the older sisters has also been married, and so the princes agreed to send their other five brothers once they had returned to Ireland with their new wives. Although the princes failed to appear, the five sisters continued to wait, eventually turning into mountains to extend their vigil into eternity. The five distinctly pointed summits (Sgùrr na Ciste Duibhe, Sgùrr na Càrnach, Sgùrr Fhuaran, Sgùrr nan Saighead and Sgurr na Moraich) are a well-known landmark and a popular hillwalking expedition. Three of the Five Sisters, which are all over 3,000 feet, are classified as full Munros, with the other two being subsidiary Munro tops.

The ridge containing the Five Sisters continues unbroken to the east where it takes in a further three Munros (Sgùrr a' Bhealaich Dheirg, Sàileag and Aonach Meadhoin) which are often known as the Brothers of Kintail. Beinn Fhada (Ben Attow) is the other main mountain in the area.

== Ownership ==
Most of Kintail is owned by the National Trust for Scotland (NTS). The Trust's Kintail and Morvich estate covers 29 square miles (75 km^{2}) and includes the Falls of Glomach, one of the highest waterfalls in Great Britain. The estate was purchased for the NTS in 1944 by Percy Unna, the Scottish Mountaineering Club president who also acquired Glen Coe for the Trust. NTS operate an outdoor education centre in Morvich, which provides accommodation for groups such as school parties undertaking field studies and outdoor pursuits.

== Wildlife and nature ==
Bird species found within Kintail include golden eagles, merlins and black-throated divers. Otters are relatively common, and pine martens also inhabit the wooded parts of the area, whilst red deer can be seen on the lower slopes of the mountains. Kintail is also home to herd of feral goats, thought to be descendants of goats first brought to Britain in around 3000 BCE by neolithic farmers. Due to this origin they are considered non-native, and as there are currently no top predators for goats NTS are considering a cull to reduce the herd, which currently numbers around 100, in order to reduce pressures on vegetation and allow the area of land covered by native woodland to increase.

== History ==
A 5 ft 9in, 2,000-year-old standing stone known as Cill Fhearchair stands within a burial ground near Shiel Bridge.

In interviews with John Lorne Campbell, Barra seanchaidh John The Coddy MacPherson recalled that Clan Macrae of Kintail were famous throughout Scotland for cooking high quality moonshine, or "peatreek" in Scots, from illegal pot stills (Scottish Gaelic: poit dhubh).

A large boulder lying on the steep southwest slopes of Sgùrr na Ciste Duibhe is known as "Prince Charlie's Stone", as it is the place where Charles Edward Stuart spent a day in the summer of 1746 hiding there from posses of redcoats after his defeat at the Battle of Culloden. At the time, the Prince had a £30,000 bounty upon his head for leading a regime change war against the House of Hanover and the Whig single party state.
