= Glen Shiel =

Coordinates: 57.2103°N 5.4239°W

Glen Shiel: Scottish Gaelic: Gleann Seile
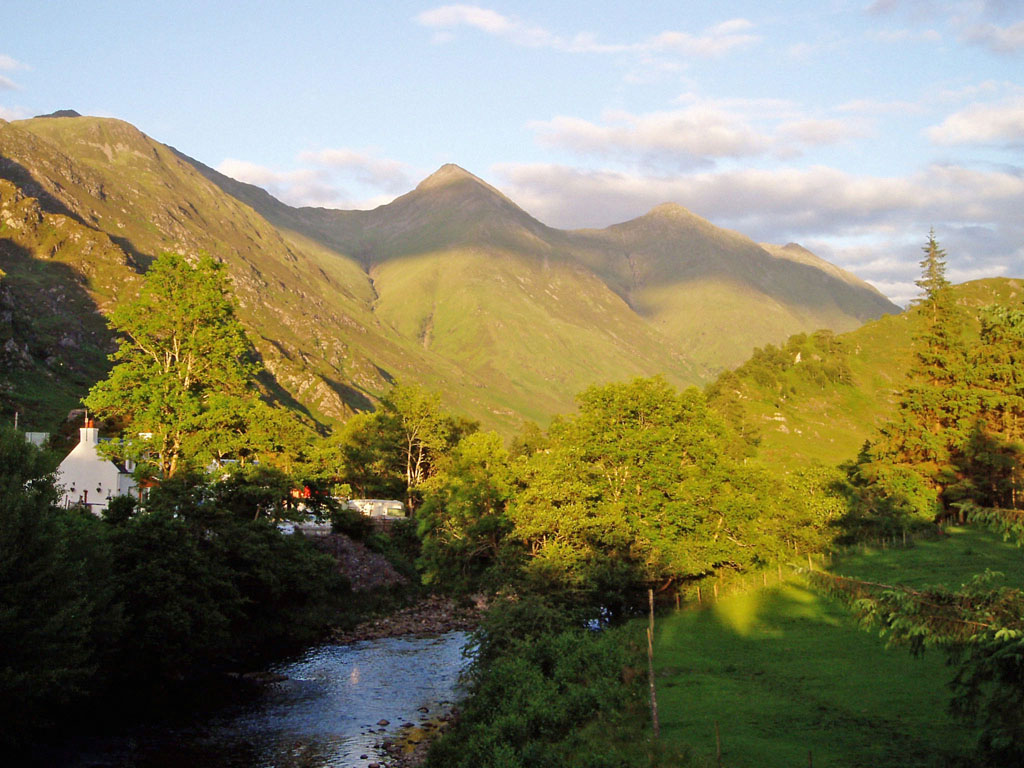
- Four of the Five Sisters of Kintail and the river Shiel from Shiel Bridge at the foot of Glen Shiel

- Location within the Highland council area
- Civil parish: Glenshiel
- Council area: Highland
- Country: Scotland
- Sovereign state: United Kingdom
- Postcode district: IV 40, IV 63
- Police: Scotland
- Fire: Scottish
- Ambulance: Scottish

Glen Shiel (Scottish Gaelic: Gleann Seile; also known as Glenshiel) is a glen in the Northwest Highlands of Scotland.

The glen runs approximately nine miles (14 kilometres) from southeast to northwest, from the Cluanie Inn (216 metres or 709 feet) at the western end of Loch Cluanie and the start of Glenmoriston to sea level at the village of Shiel Bridge and Loch Duich. The northern side of the glen lies within the Kintail and Morvich estate owned by the National Trust for Scotland. The lower part of Glen Shiel, including both sides of the glen from the site of the Battle of Glen Shiel down to Dornie on the shores of Loch Duich, lies within the Kintail National Scenic Area, one of the forty national scenic areas in Scotland.

== Roads ==
The A87 Road to the Isles runs the full length of the glen, reaching a high point of 271 metres (889 feet) two miles (three kilometres) west of the Cluanie Inn. The remnants of the military road connecting Fort Augustus to the Bernera barracks in Glenelg built between 1750 and 1784 by William Caulfeild, the successor to General Wade, can be seen 1/4 mile (400 metres) west of the Cluanie Inn.

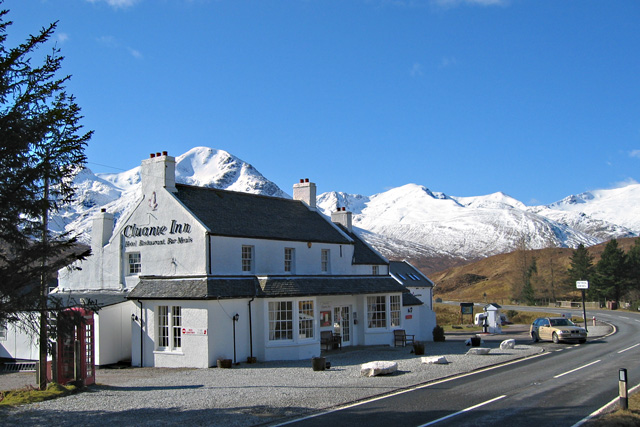
The Cluanie Inn at the head of Glen Shiel, with the A87 (right) and the South Glen Shiel ridge (background)

== Geography ==
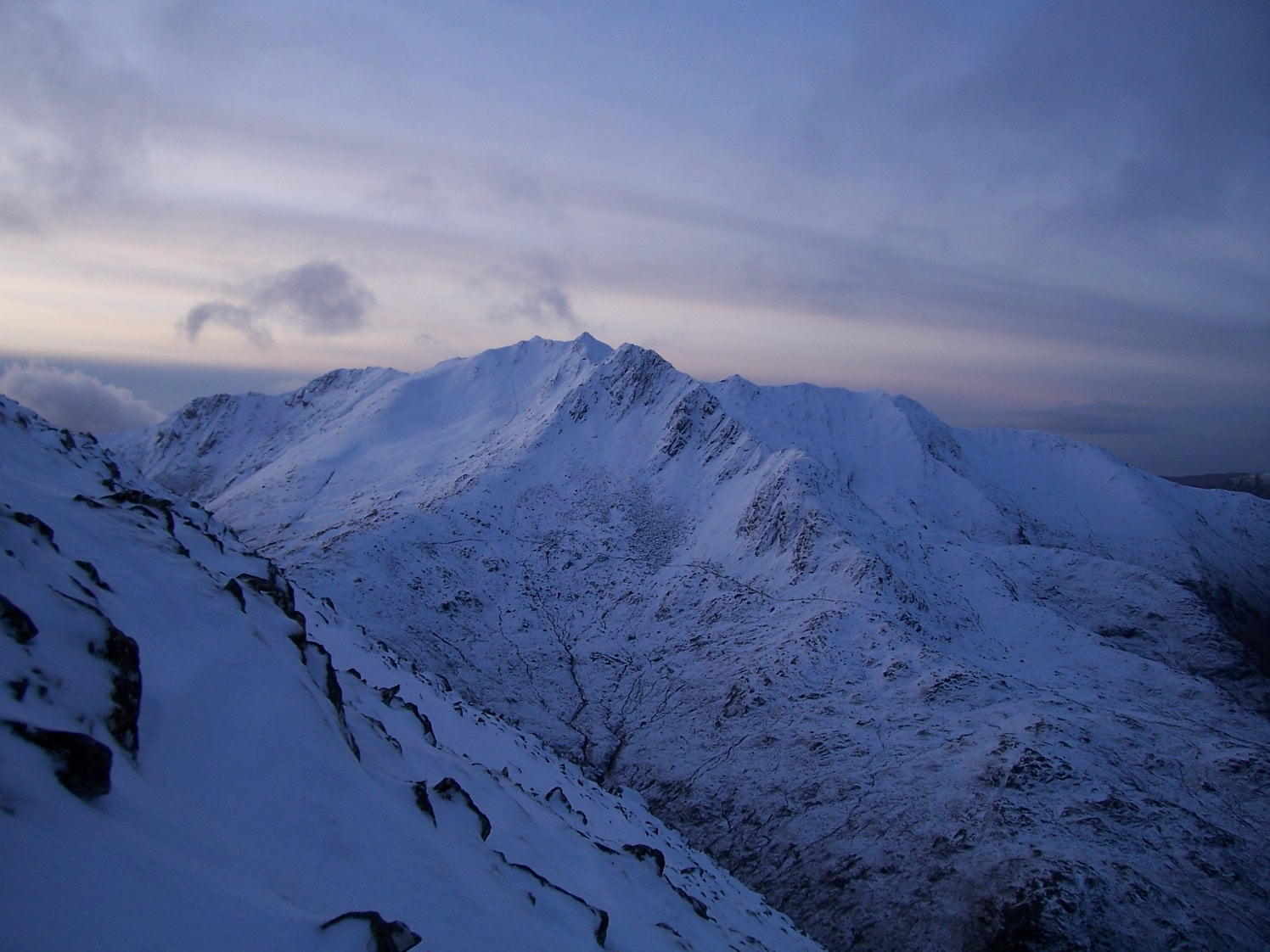
The Forcan ridge of The Saddle (centre)

The North Glen Shiel ridge that forms the northern side of the glen consists of the Five Sisters of Kintail (Sgùrr na Ciste Duibhe, Sgùrr na Càrnach, Sgùrr Fhuaran, Sgùrr nan Spàinteach and Sgùrr nan Saighead) in the lower part of the glen, and Sàileag, Sgùrr a' Bhealaich Dheirg and Aonach Meadhoin in the upper part.

To the south of the glen, the South Glen Shiel (or South Cluanie) ridge (Creag a' Mhàim, Druim Shionnach, Aonach air Chrith, Maol Chinn-dearg, Sgùrr an Doire Leathain, Sgùrr an Lochain and Creag nan Damh) occupies the upper part, and in the lower part are The Saddle, according to W. H. Murray "the best mountain of the region both in distant shape and close acquaintance," and Sgùrr na Sgine. From Glen Shiel these last two mountains are only accessible by the side glens – Allt Mhalagain is the most popular – that run off Glen Shiel, unlike the North and South Glen Shiel ridges whose slopes can be reached directly as they run along the glen.

John Macleod writes of the glen that:

The descent of Glen Shiel, on the road to Skye, takes you through one of Scotland's most spectacular mountain passes: it is almost a cliché of Highland scenery – foaming river, burns streaming white, crags frowning from on high, often mist, generally rain. The road winds, turns and falls. Here and there the eye catches a tumbled ruin.

—

The river running down the glen is the river Shiel, which flows into Loch Duich.

At the 2011 census, the population of the civil parish (spelled Glenshiel) was 215. At the 2022 census, the population was similar at approximately 210. The area of the parish is 57,328 acres (23,200 hectares). Loch Duich community council covers this area.

== Flora and fauna ==
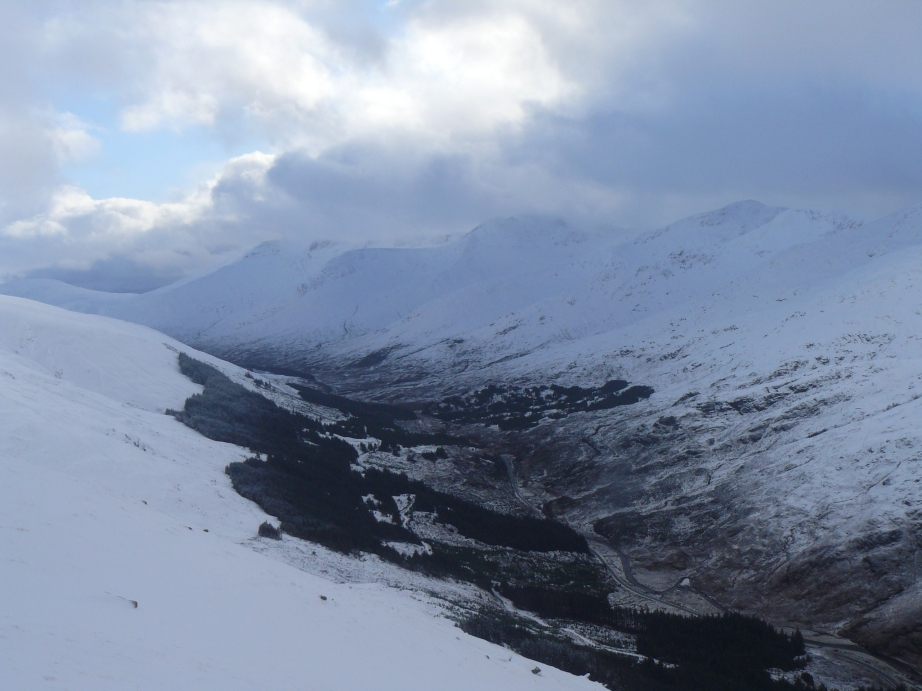
Part of the afforested section of Glen Shiel looking south-east from the slopes of Sàileag, with the A87 running up to Loch Cluanie (out of sight, top left)

The glen contains native tree species such as common alder, downy birch, sessile oak and rowan. Parts of the northern flanks of the upper glen have been afforested with a mix of Scots pine, Sitka spruce and Norway spruce. Glen Shiel was within the former Forestry Commission's Fort Augustus Forest Division, and in a 2008 report the Commission wrote "Consideration is being given to restoration of ancient woodland sites in dramatic landscapes like the Great Glen and Glen Shiel."

Notable plant species growing on the grassy flanks of the mountains include fragrant orchid, butterfly orchid, pale butterwort and mountain azalea (Loiseleuria procumbens).

Herds of red deer and wild goats roam the glen.

== The Battle of Glen Shiel ==
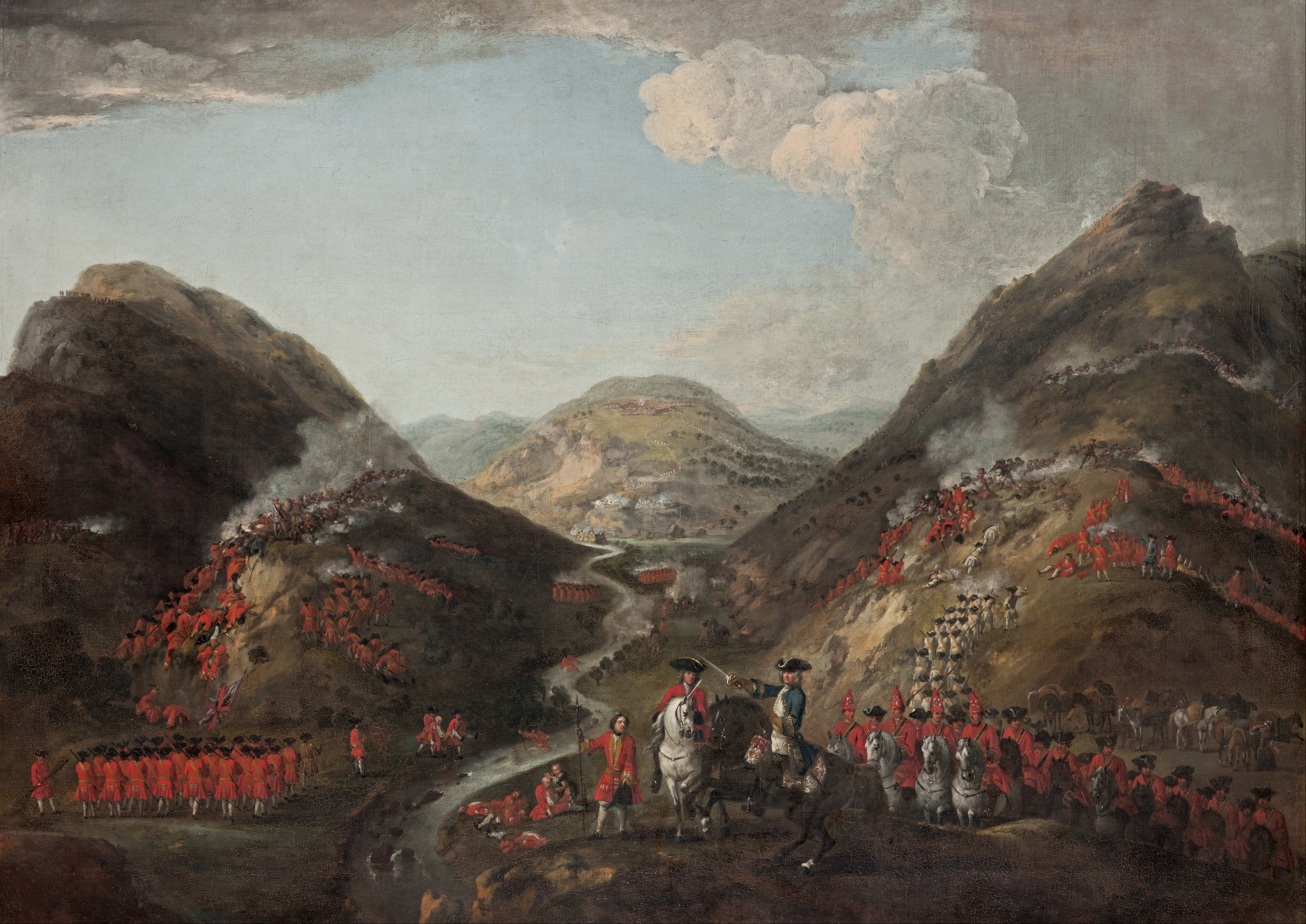
The Battle of Glenshiel 1719 by Peter Tillemans, 1719

The Battle of Glen Shiel took place on 10 June 1719 midway up the glen. It was fought between British government forces and an alliance of Jacobites and Spaniards, and resulted in a victory for the British forces. It was the last close engagement of British and foreign troops on mainland British soil. The battle is sometimes considered an extension of the 1715 rising, but is more correctly a separate rebellion and was the only rising to be extinguished by a single military action. It is "Scotland's only battle site with contemporary remains still visible – including the stone dyke enclosure where the Jacobite munitions were stored".

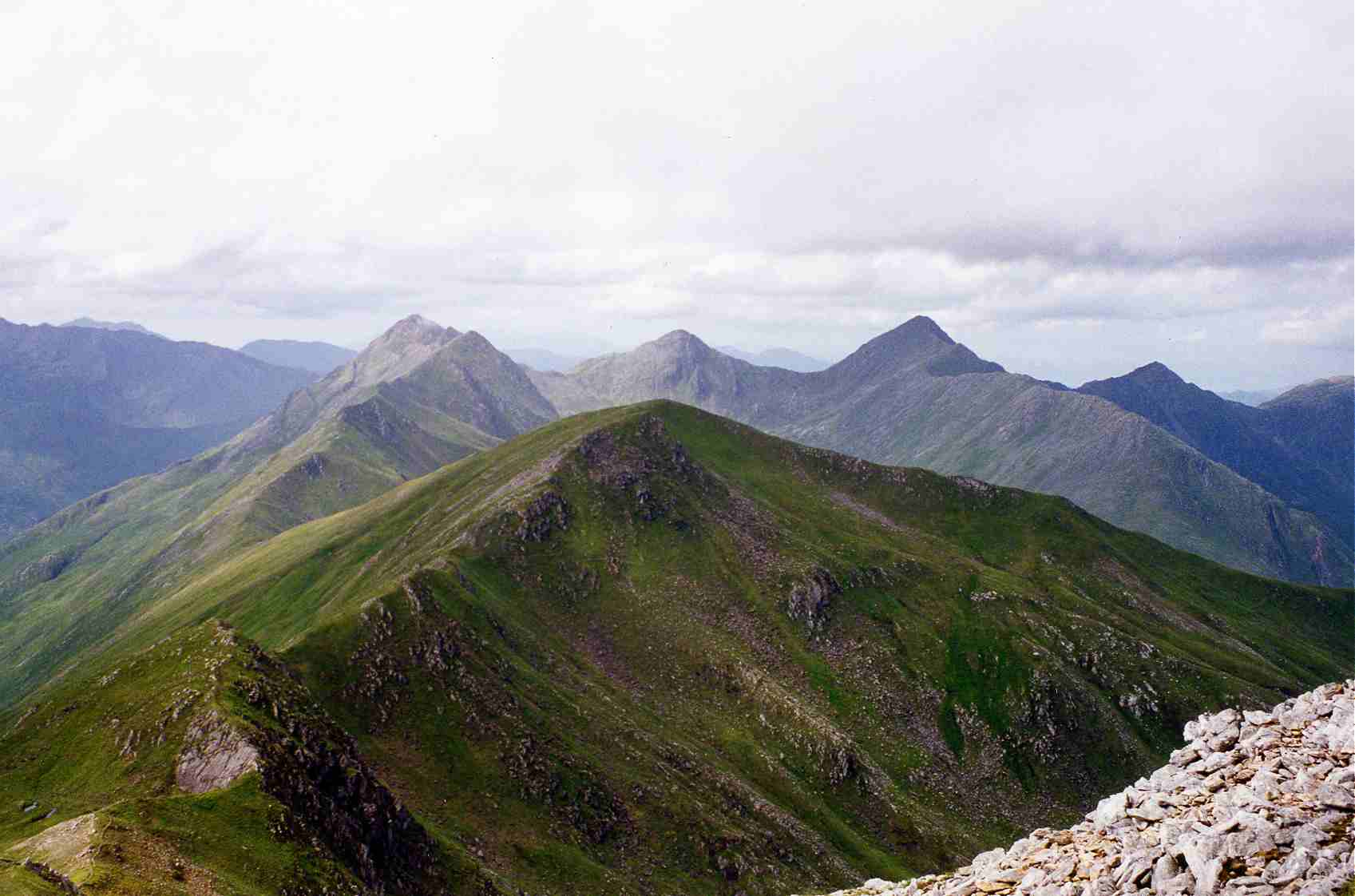
Sgùrr nan Spàinteach (middle background left) and Sàileag (centre) from the east. The Spanish troops retreated up the southern slopes of the mountain from Glen Shiel (left).

The natural strength of the Jacobite position, which was positioned on easily defendable crags in the glen, had been increased by hasty fortifications. A barricade had been constructed across the road, and along the face of the hill on the north side of the river entrenchments had been thrown up. Here the main body was posted, consisting of a Spanish regiment, Clan Cameron of Lochiel with about 150 men, about 150 of Lidcoat’s and others, Rob Roy MacGregor with 40 men, 50 men of Clan Mackinnon and 200 from the Clan MacKenzie. British forces included 150 grenadiers under Major Milburn, Montagu’s Regiment, commanded by Lieutenant Colonel Lawrence, a detachment of 50 men under Colonel Harrison, Huffel's Dutch Regiment, four companies of Amerongen's regiment from the Clan Fraser, Clan Ross and the Clan Sutherland, 80 men of Clan MacKay, Clayton’s Regiment, commanded by Lieutenant Colonel Reading and about 100 men of the Clan Munro under George Munro of Culcairn.

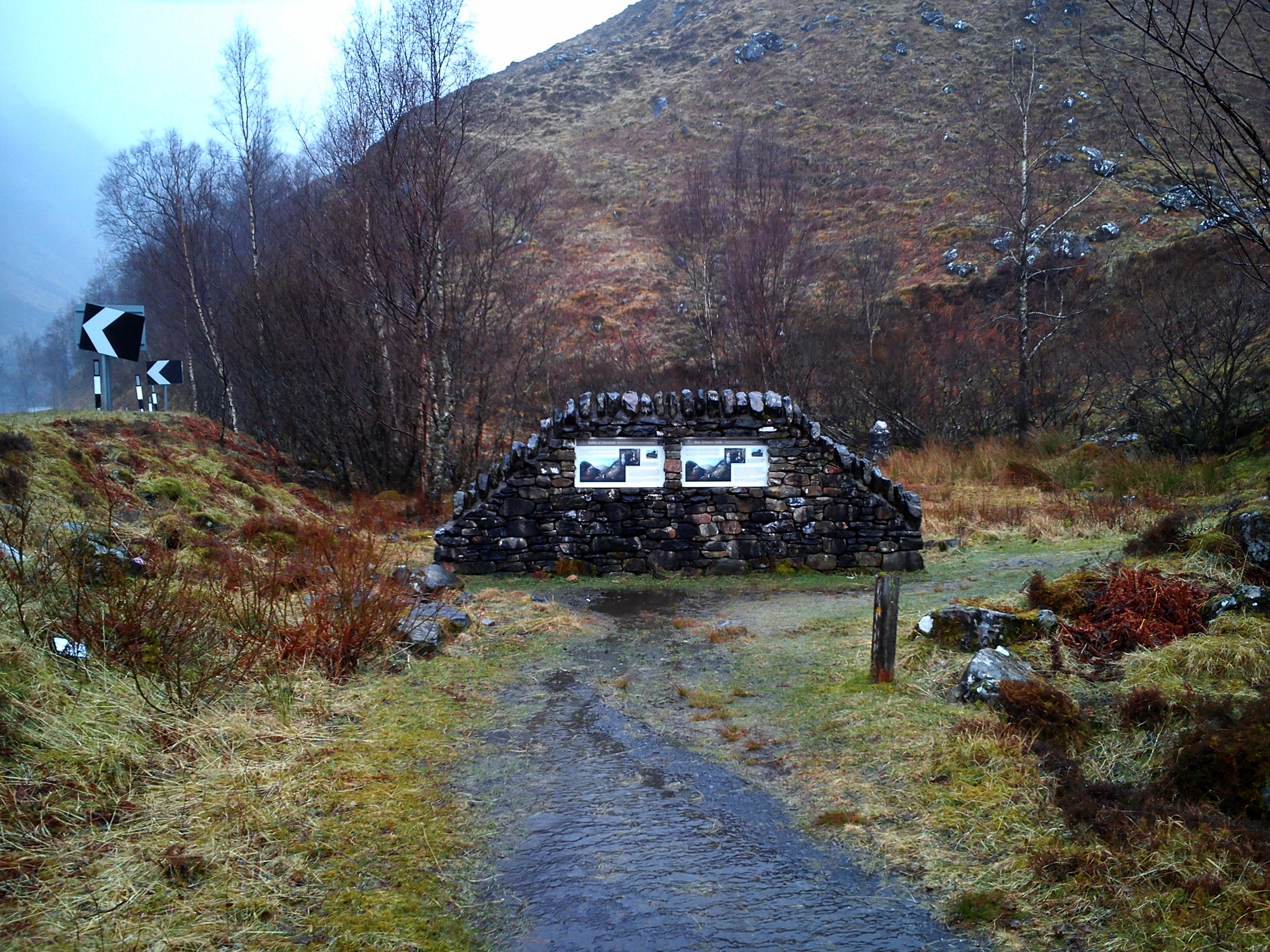
Battle of Glen Shiel Memorial, Glen Shiel

One of the peaks on the northern side of the glen, Sgùrr nan Spàinteach (Peak of the Spaniards), derives its name from the 200 Spanish troops who fought a rearguard action on the side of the defeated Jacobite rebels and who retreated over the peak. This peak's parent mountain is Sgùrr na Ciste Duibhe, which means peak of the black chest. Irvine Butterfield writes that "although some of the coins they [the Spanish soldiers] dropped were later found there is no mention that they fell from a black chest [...] the black chest is in reality the deep hollow of the Allt Dearg on the south-west slope [of Sgùrr na Ciste Duibhe]."

The painting The Battle of Glenshiel 1719 by the Flemish painter Peter Tillemans (c. 1684–1734) shows the opposing forces in the glen; the figures in the foreground probably include Lord George Murray and Rob Roy MacGregor on the Jacobite side and General Joseph Wightman on the British side. This "highly accurate" painting, which hangs in the Scottish National Portrait Gallery, was originally catalogued as The Battle of Killiecrankie, 1689.

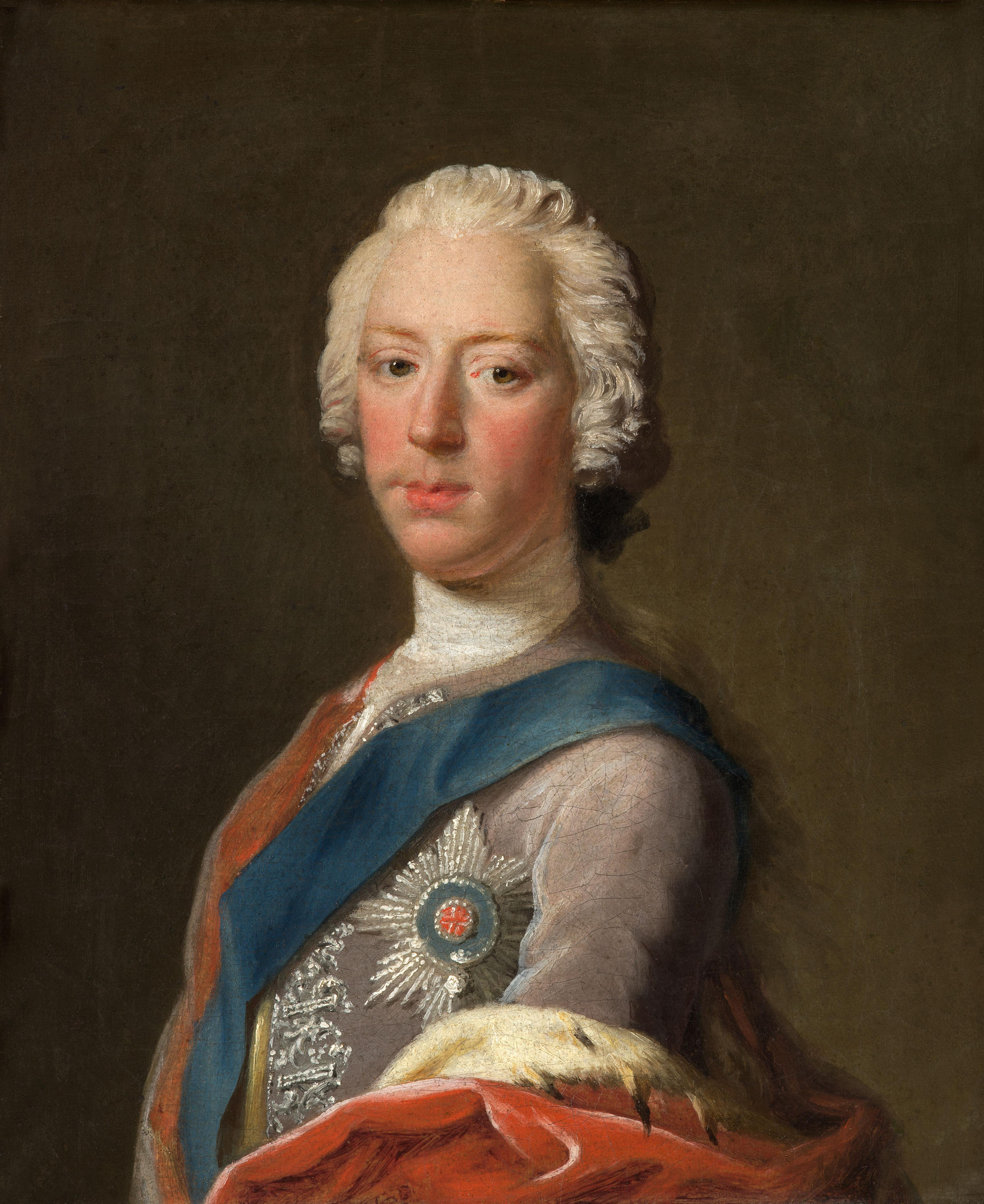
Charles Edward Stuart, painted in 1745 by Allan Ramsay

== Prince Charlie's Stone ==
The steep south-west slopes of Sgùrr na Ciste Duibhe contain a large boulder known as "Prince Charlie's Stone", where Charles Edward Stuart, known as "Bonnie Prince Charlie", spent a day in the summer of 1746 hiding from Government troops once he had left the Isle of Skye. At the time he had a £30,000 bounty on his head, having fled after the Battle of Culloden. After he reached Glen Shiel, Charles was sheltered by the "Seven Men of Glenmoriston", who "lived in a cave called Corriedhoga, high in Glenmoriston where the glen closes toward Loch Cluanie", some ten miles (16 kilometres) east of Glen Shiel. They sheltered the prince for a week during July 1746, vowing

That their backs should be to God and their faces to the Devil; that all the curses the Scripture did pronounce might come upon them and all their posterity if they did not stand firm to the Prince in the greatest danger...

—

== Notable people ==
- John Farquhar Munro MSP was born in Glen Shiel on 26 August 1934.

== Bibliography ==
- W. H. Murray, The Companion Guide to the West Highlands of Scotland, 7th ed., Glasgow: William Collins, 1977.
