= John o' Groats Trail =

Walking route in Scotland

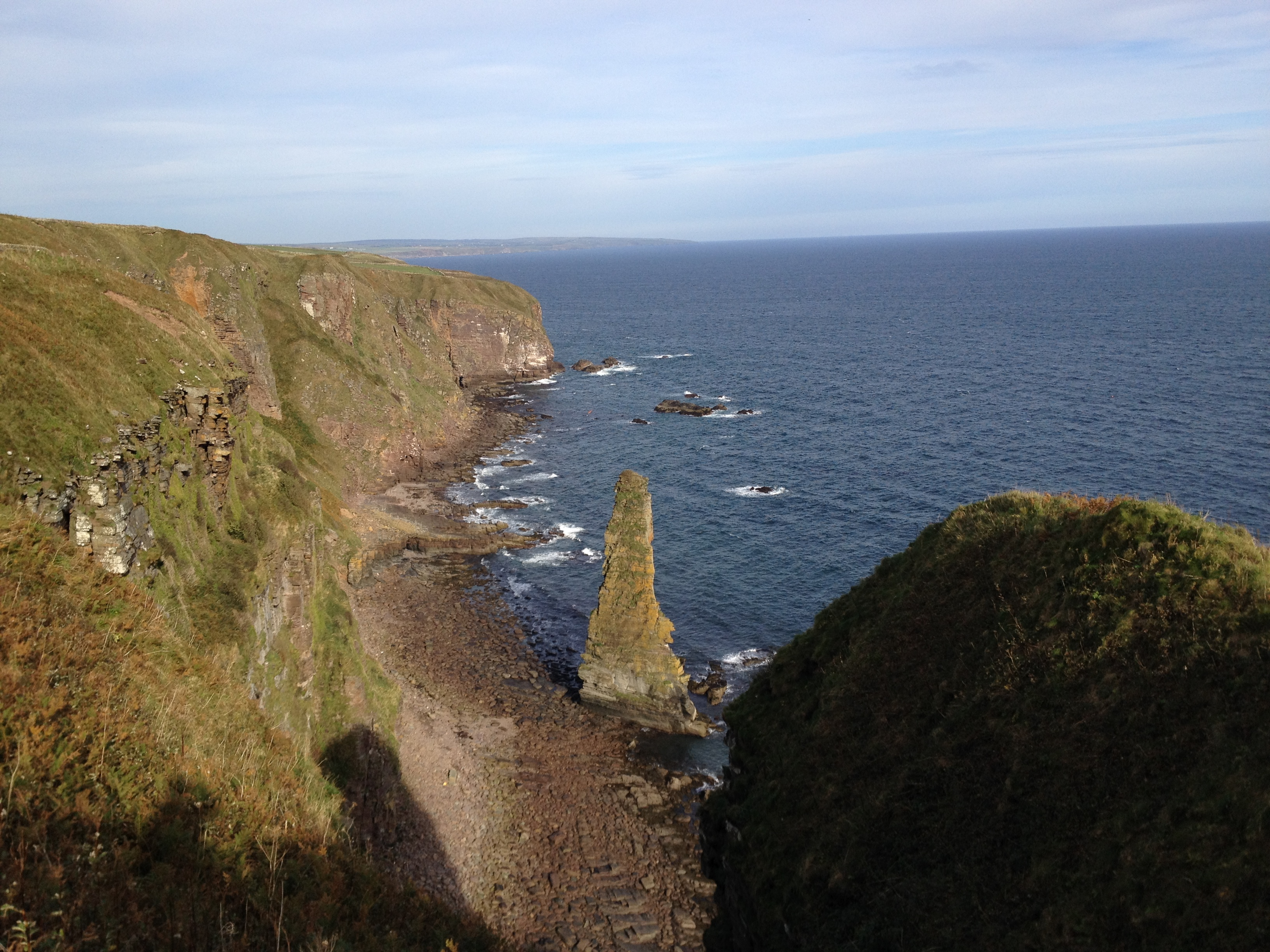
View of The Clett (sea stack) along the coast between Berriedale and Dunbeath.

The John o' Groats Trail is a Scottish long-distance walking route from Inverness to John o' Groats, traversing back lanes, footpaths, shorelines and cliff tops of the Scottish Highlands. The route gives access to accommodation, meals and shops at the end of each stage of the walk. The route is in use but is still a work in progress. Work began in March 2015. All of the route is walkable, and many sections of the coastal route are walked frequently by local walkers as well as long-distance walkers. However, work is ongoing to bring the route up to the usual standards for walking routes. Markers and basic infrastructure such as stiles and bridges are still needed in some places. Most work is being carried out on a voluntary basis.

The walk presents some obstacles that an established route normally would not. In a few places the route requires crossing of barbed wire fences, river fording, boulder scrambling, and strenuous walking through summer vegetation. These can be dangerous or difficult activities if not done with care by a fit, experienced walker.

== The route ==
The John o' Groats Trail is 147 miles (235 km) long. It is divided into 14 stages that are each walkable in a day. All stages end in a town or village that provides accommodation.

The route begins in Inverness at Inverness Castle and follows the Inverness waterfront most of the way to the Kessock Bridge. Crossing the bridge, it then crosses the Black Isle on Forestry Commission lands and small back roads. It then continues across the Cromarty Bridge and follows back roads to Evanton and Alness. Before reaching Tain, it diverts into the Morangie Forest for several miles.

After Tain, the route mostly follows the coast, which begins as low sandy beaches in Sutherland and develops into cliffs in Caithness. After Tain, the next town is Dornoch, where the route goes along the edge of Royal Dornoch Golf Course, then goes past Embo and along the shores of Loch Fleet. Then it goes through Golspie and past Dunrobin Castle on the way to Brora. It reaches the halfway point at Helmsdale.

After Helmsdale, the scenery along the cliffs, at several ruins of old fishing stations, at small harbours, and at several sea stacks and arches is spectacular, culminating in the distinctive Stacks of Duncansby. After Helmsdale the route crosses the Ord of Caithness and goes past Badbea Clearance Village on the way to Berriedale. The next town is Dunbeath and then Lybster. After that, it reaches Whaligoe where the famous Whaligoe Steps descend to an old fishing harbour. After that, the route goes past one of the highest sea arches on the British coast on the way to Wick. After Wick it passes the lighthouse at Noss Head, goes past Castle Sinclair Girnigoe, and rounds Sinclairs Bay. It then goes through the village of Keiss and then the final stage takes the walker past Duncansby Head and finally on to John o' Groats.

The following cities/towns are the stage endpoints for the route:

- Inverness
- Culbokie
- Alness
- Tain
- Dornoch
- Golspie
- Brora
- Helmsdale
- Berriedale
- Dunbeath
- Lybster
- Whaligoe
- Wick
- Keiss
- John o' Groats

== Connections ==
The John o' Groats Trail connects to three other long distance routes at various points along its length:

- Great Glen Way at Inverness
- South Loch Ness Trail at Inverness
- North Highland Way at John o' Groats and Duncansby Head

The John o' Groats Trail, the North Highland Way, the Cape Wrath Trail, and the Great Glen Way can all be combined to form the Great Northern Loop, a walk of 607 miles.
