= North Highland Way =

Hiking trail in Highland, Scotland

- Length: 150 mi (240 km)
- Location: Scotland
- Trailheads: Duncansby Head; Cape Wrath
- Use: Hiking
- Difficulty: Moderate
- Season: All year
- Hazards: Weather

The North Highland Way (Scottish Gaelic: A Tuath na Gàidhealtachd dòigh) is a proposed 150 miles (240 km) hiking, cycling and horse riding trail in Scotland. Currently without official signage, it is navigable by GPS, linking Duncansby Head on the North East coast to Cape Wrath in the North West of Scotland's coast. The North Highland Way connects the Cape Wrath Trail (which opened in January, 2013) in the west with the John o' Groats Trail in the east. The North Coast 500 is a driving route, which follows a similar line to the North Highland Way. In 2024, the route began to be developed as a marked walking trail under the new name North Coast Trail.

== Route description ==
The route of the North Highland Way varies in length due to the various options when it comes to walking this particular route. The terrain of the North Highland Way varies hugely, crossing beaches, forests, road and rough paths as well as some remote areas. The Herald reported in June 2020 that "Determined walkers can tackle a route from Duncansby Head to Cape Wrath, but it involves trekking across grassy paths, sheep trails, shoreland and road, and using GPS directions". A more structured trail with defined paths and its own signposts, featuring links to local accommodation and services, was first suggested by local group the Caithness Waybaggers in 1992, but has not been successful in securing funding.

The start of the North Highland Way is located in Duncansby Head, the most north-easterly part of Scotland's mainland, looking out to the Orkney Isles. From Duncansby Head, the route continues west, along Scotland's North coast. This first section of the route passes through the town of John o' Groats and the Castle of Mey. The early stages of the North Highland Way also provide the opportunity to visit Dunnet Head, the most northerly point of the British mainland.

Further stages of the route follow Scotland's North Coast, passing through the towns of Strathy, Bettyhill and Tongue.

== Features ==
Listed from east to west:

- Duncansby Head
- Duncansby Head Lighthouse
- John o' Groats
- John o' Groats Mill
- Gill's Bay Ferry
- Castle of Mey
- Dunnet Head
- Murkle
- Thurso
- Scrabster Ferry
- Reay
- House of Tongue
- Cape Wrath
- Cape Wrath Lighthouse

== History ==
The idea of a North Highland Way has its roots in a proposal for a Caithness Way, made in 1992 by a local group, the Caithness Waybaggers, which formed to pursue the project. The proposed 60-mile (97 km) route would have started at Dunbeath harbour and run via Altnabreac railway station, Westerdale, Halkirk and Thurso to John o' Groats. However, the project met with concerns from farmers and land owners on the route, problems with accommodation and with paths, and suffered from a lack of support.

The idea was revived in 2010 with a proposal for a new 115-mile (185 km) route from John o' Groats to Cape Wrath via Dunnet Head, Holborn Head, Strathy Point and Skerray. The area of the proposed route is one of the few areas of the Highlands to lack a branded distance walking path. An approach was made to the Highland Council and other public bodies seeking their support, and a survey of public opinion was conducted.

Tina Irving, secretary of the Dunnet Head Educational Trust and described by The Herald as "one of the driving forces behind the campaign", was quoted as saying "This is probably not the best time to be looking for public money, so I know we are not going to get the built paths like the West Highland Way or the Great Glen Way. But joining up the core path network that Highland Council had to develop for access under the land reform legislation would be feasible". The project also received support from John Thurso, then the MP for Caithness, Sutherland and Easter Ross. However, Highlands and Islands Enterprise, who the Dunnet Head Educational Trust had had discussions with, stated in 2010 that the project did not fit its remit for funding.

In October 2013, Irving told The Press and Journal that she thought Highland Council was using "delaying tactics" to avoid providing £14,500 to further develop and market the route, because it did not want to spend money in Caithness. It was reported that Irving had 32 businesses signed up to support the project, and had produced marketing materials to the cost of £4,500. Irving claimed that she had received three different answers about how to go about requesting funds from the council in three months, but a spokesperson for the council told the newspaper that while it was willing to support the project, it had received no formal grant application and that it could not retrospectively fund the promotional materials Irving had already paid for.

In October 2014, Irving told The Herald that a route had been identified on the website, Walking World, but that work was required on conducting a feasibility study, consultation with landowners, a business plan and market studies. The feasibility study and business plan have now been completed but are not in the public domain. A Friends of the North Highland Way group has been formed to raise money from people using the route, for investment in promotional activities.

The Herald further reported that a spokesperson from the Highland Council said Brough Bay Ltd approached the council in late 2013, "as they were unable to continue undertaking the level of work that would be required if this was purely on a voluntary basis (...And that although) unable to assist in terms of providing direct funding to an individual company, the council did recognise that the idea had great potential for the area so agreed to explore other options". According to the council, attempts to bring local community representatives together had been unsuccessful and "there had been indications that most were not willing to be part of a group to lead the project at this time". Highlands and Islands Enterprise was reported as stating that "We have held informal discussions regarding the North Highland Way but have not received any formal application for assistance".

By 2020, plans for the route appeared to have stalled. Irving said the requirements from regulatory bodies for costly feasibility studies and a business plan have hampered efforts.

In 2024, the charity Association of Northern Trails Scotland (ANTS) received funding to start developing a trail across the north coast of Scotland between Duncansby Head and Cape Wrath, with initial focus on the eastern half to Melvich. The effort began in June 2024 with community consultations, with plans to mark the route in spring and summer of 2025. ANTS calls the route the North Coast Trail.
