= List of shipwrecks in September 1861 =

The following list includes ships sunk, foundered, grounded, or otherwise lost during September 1861.

== 1 September ==
List of shipwrecks: 1 September 1861
Ship	State	Description
Barbadoes	United Kingdom	The barque was wrecked in Algoa Bay.
Ellen	United Kingdom	The barque was wrecked in Struys Bay. She was on a voyage from Colombo, Ceylon, to London.
Gardner	United Kingdom	The barque ran aground east of Læsø, Denmark. Her crew landed at Gothenburg, Sweden. She was on a voyage from South Shields, County Durham, to Swinemunde with coal.
Heinrich	Hamburg	The brig was driven ashore at Sandy Hook, New Jersey, United States. She was on a voyage from Newcastle upon Tyne, Northumberland, United Kingdom to New York, United States. She was refloated the next day.
Honour	United Kingdom	The smack departed from Liverpool, Lancashire for Rouen, Seine-Inférieure, France. No further trace, presumed foundered with the loss of all hands.
J. G. Morrow	United States	The 163-ton sidewheel ferry struck a snag and sank in the Missouri River at St. Joseph, Missouri.
Maria	Kingdom of Hanover	The ship was driven ashore at Thisted, Denmark. She was on a voyage from Leer to Königsberg, Prussia.
Newa	Russia	The ship was driven ashore at Thisted. She was on a voyage from London to Königsberg.
Villiers	United Kingdom	The brigantine was wrecked on the Mixen Sand, in the Bristol Channel with the loss of two of her crew. She was on a voyage from Cardiff, Glamorgan, to Alicante, Spain.

== 2 September ==
List of shipwrecks: 2 September 1861
Ship	State	Description
HMS Algerine	Royal Navy	The Algerine-class gunboat ran aground at the mouth of the Yangtze. She was refloated the next day with assistance from HMS Flamer and HMS Starling (both Royal Navy).
Amazon	(United Kingdom of Great Britain and Ireland) Royal Yacht Club	The cutter yacht was run into by the steamship Prince Consort (United Kingdom) and sank at Ryde, Isle of Wight All five people on board survived. She was subsequently raised and repaired.
Leonidas	United Kingdom	The steamship ran aground in the Narva and was wrecked. Her crew were rescued. She was on a voyage from Saint Petersburg, Russia, to Hartlepool, County Durham.
Mary Ann	United Kingdom	The sloop sprang a leak and foundered in the English Channel between Folkestone and Dungeness, Kent with the loss of one of her crew. She was on a voyage from London to Arundel, Sussex.
Telemaco	Russia	The steamship foundered west of Málaga, Spain, with the loss of all but one of her crew.
William Tell	France	The ship was destroyed by fire in the North River.

== 3 September ==
List of shipwrecks: 3 September 1861
Ship	State	Description
St. Johannes	Danzig	The ship ran aground on the Nehrung, in the Baltic Sea. She was on a voyage from Danzig to Stettin.
Villiers	United Kingdom	The brigantine ran aground and sank off the Mumbles, Glamorgan. Her four crew were rescued by the tug Beaufort (United Kingdom).

== 4 September ==
List of shipwrecks: 4 September 1861
Ship	State	Description
Colonel Long	Confederate States of America	American Civil War, Union blockade: Carrying a cargo of arrowroot, sponges, and whiskey and a crew of eight, the 14-ton fishing schooner was captured and scuttled in the North Atlantic Ocean off the coast of Georgia by the sloop-of-war USS Jamestown (United States Navy).
Dayspring	United Kingdom	The ship ran aground at Kurrachee, India. She was on a voyage from Liverpool, Lancashire, to Kurrachee. She was refloated.
Gulterus	United Kingdom	The ship was driven ashore and damaged at Wick, Caithness. She was later refloated and taken in to North Shields, Northumberland for repairs.
Ida Aloenius	Flag unknown	The ship was taken in to Fredrikshavn, Denmark, in a derelict condition.
Swea	Sweden	The steamship caught fire at Gothenburg.
Terrible	Regia Marina	The ironclad frigate collided with the transport ship Voltarna (Italy) off Toulon, Var, France during sea trials and was severely damaged. She put back to Toulon.
Vienna	United Kingdom	The ship ran aground at Portsmouth, Hampshire. She was on a voyage from Seaham, County Durham, to Portsmouth. She was refloated the next day and taken in to Portsmouth.

== 5 September ==
List of shipwrecks: 5 September 1861
Ship	State	Description
Caulaincourt	France	The 657-ton whaling ship was stove in by ice in the Chukchi Sea off Point Belcher (70°47′40″N 159°39′02″W) on the coast of Russian America and became a total loss.
Haren	United Kingdom	The ship ran aground on the Brake Sand, off the Kent coast. She was refloated.
Trio	United Kingdom	The fishing vessel was driven ashore and severely damaged at Wick, Caithness.

== 6 September ==
List of shipwrecks: 6 September 1861
Ship	State	Description
Cassandra	United Kingdom	The ship ran aground on the Gunfleet Sand, in the North Sea off the coast of Suffolk. Her crew were rescued by Ellen Highfield (United Kingdom). Cassandra was on a voyage from Hartlepool, County Durham, to London. She was subsequently severely damaged by fire.

== 7 September ==
List of shipwrecks: 7 September 1861
Ship	State	Description
J. O. Baker	United Kingdom	The ship ran aground in the River Mersey. She was on a voyage from Liverpool, Lancashire, to Genoa, Italy. She was refloated the next day.

== 8 September ==
List of shipwrecks: 8 September 1861
Ship	State	Description
Drobak	Norway	The barque was abandoned in the Atlantic Ocean. Her fifteen crew were rescued by Baron Clyde (United Kingdom). Drobak was on a voyage from Quebec City, Province of Canada, British North America to Hull, Yorkshire, United Kingdom.
Malakoff	United Kingdom	The barque foundered in the South China Sea. Her crew were rescued. She was on a voyage from Hong Kong to Shanghai, China.
Retreat	United Kingdom	The ship collided with John Wells United Kingdom and was abandoned in the Atlantic Ocean. She was on a voyage from Waterford to Quebec City.
Robert	Netherlands	The schooner was run down 7 nautical miles (13 km) west of Cape de Gatt, Spain, by the steamship Vencedor do Africa (Spain) and sank. All nine people on board were rescued by Vencedor do Africa. Robert was on a voyage from London, United Kingdom, to Syria, Greece.

== 10 September ==
List of shipwrecks: 10 September 1861
Ship	State	Description
Joseph Hasselet	United States	The schooner sprang a leak and foundered off Great Egg Harbour, New Jersey with the loss of five of the seven people on board. The survivors clung to a plank, but one of them drowned the next day. Her captain was rescued on 13 September by the schooner N. E. Clark (United States). Joseph Hasselet was on a voyage from Stony Point, New York to Milford, Delaware.

== 11 September ==
List of shipwrecks: 11 September 1861
Ship	State	Description
Goldseeker	United Kingdom	The lugger foundered in a squall off the coast of County Dublin with the loss of all eight crew.
Honour	United Kingdom	The smack departed from Liverpool, Lancashire for Rouen, Seine-Inférieure France. No further trace, presumed foundered with the loss of all hands.
William Boothby	United Kingdom	The ship was wrecked at "Moosepekay Head Harbour".

== 12 September ==
List of shipwrecks: 12 September 1861
Ship	State	Description
Barbadoes	United Kingdom	The brig was wrecked at Port Elizabeth, Cape Colony. Her crew were rescued. She was on a voyage from Natal to London.
Benjamin	France	The ship was wrecked in Wangchew Bay, China. She was on a voyage from Foo Chow Foo to Shanghai.
City of Manchester	United Kingdom	The ship was wrecked off Cape Race, Newfoundland, British North America.
Jarrow	United Kingdom	The ship was driven ashore at Kronstadt, Russia. She was on a voyage from Newcastle upon Tyne, Northumberland, to Kronstadt.
Margaret	United Kingdom	The ship sprang a leak off Cape Wrath, Caithness. She put in to Loch Eriboll and was beached. She was on a voyage from Wick, Caithness, to Cork. Subsequently repaired and resumed her voyage.
Tamerlane	United Kingdom	The barque foundered in the Atlantic Ocean. Her fifteen crew took to the longboat; they were rescued on 18 September by Tara (United Kingdom). Tamerlane was on a voyage from Sunderland, County Durham to Quebec City, Province of Canada, British North America.
William Boothby	United Kingdom	The ship was wrecked off Cape Race.

== 13 September ==
List of shipwrecks: 13 September 1861
Ship	State	Description
Countess of Durham	United Kingdom	The ship was beached at Deal, Kent.
Frederick	United Kingdom	The barque was wrecked at Dundalk, County Louth. Her crew were rescued by the Dundalk Lifeboat.
Jose Maria	Spain	The ship was driven ashore between "Lanag" and San Nicolas, Spanish East Indies. Her crew were rescued. She was on a voyage from Amoy, China, to Manila, Spanish East Indies. She was declared a total loss.
Pickering	United Kingdom	The schooner was run into by the steamship Lady Berridale and was beached on the Tynemouth Rocks. She was refloated the next day and towed in to North Shields, Northumberland.

== 14 September ==
List of shipwrecks: 14 September 1861
Ship	State	Description
Active	United Kingdom	The schooner was wrecked on the Harry Furlong Rocks.
Atlas	United Kingdom	The ship was abandoned in the Atlantic Ocean. She was on a voyage from Glasgow, Renfrewshire to St. Stephen, New Brunswick, British North America.
City of Mobile	United States	The ship was driven ashore in the River Mersey. She was refloated and anchored in the Sloyne.
Judah	Confederate States of America	American Civil War, Union blockade: The schooner, a Confederate privateer and blockade runner, was boarded and set afire while moored at the Pensacola Navy Yard in Pensacola, Florida, by 100 United States Navy and United States Marine Corps personnel who rowed into the harbor in four launches from the screw frigate USS Colorado (United States Navy). Judah broke her moorings, drifted into the middle of Pensacola Bay, burned to the waterline, and sank opposite Fort Barrancas.
Providence	United Kingdom	The brigantine was abandoned in the Irish Sea. Her four crew were rescued by the paddle steamer Scotia (United Kingdom). Providence was towed in to Holyhead.
Unnamed	United Kingdom	The ship foundered 6 nautical miles (11 km) south west of Great Orme Head, Caernarfonshire. All hands presumed lost.

== 15 September ==
List of shipwrecks: 15 September 1861
Ship	State	Description
Alma	United Kingdom	The sloop was run down and sunk at Holyhead, Anglesey by Admiral Moorsom (United Kingdom) with the loss of two of her three crew.
Deptford	United Kingdom	The ship ran aground at Whitby, Yorkshire. She was on a voyage from Vyborg, Grand Duchy of Finland, to Hull, Yorkshire.
Margaret	(United Kingdom of Great Britain and Ireland) New Zealand	The schooner hit the Molyneux bar at the mouth of the Clutha River in New Zealand.
Pioneer	(United Kingdom of Great Britain and Ireland) New Zealand	The schooner hit the Molyneux bar at the mouth of the Clutha River in New Zealand.
Providence	United Kingdom	The brig foundered in the Pacific Ocean. She was on a voyage from San Francisco, California, United States to a port in Victoria.
Superior	United Kingdom	The schooner was wrecked 3 nautical miles (5.6 km) north of Arzila, Morocco. Her crew were rescued.
Waterlily	United Kingdom	The ship ran aground on the Goodwin Sands, Kent and was damaged. She was on a voyage from Mogador, Morocco, to Hull. She was refloated and towed in to Ramsgate, Kent.
Unnamed	United Kingdom	The brig was wrecked on the Kipern Rocks, Anglesey.
Unnamed	United Kingdom	The schooner was wrecked on the Kipern Rocks.

== 16 September ==
List of shipwrecks: 16 September 1861
Ship	State	Description
Armida	Italy	The brig ran ashore at Apes Hill, on the Barbary Coast and was damaged. She was on a voyage from Hartlepool, County Durham, to Genoa, Italy. She was later refloated and taken in to Gibraltar, where she was placed under repair.
Colonist	United Kingdom	The steamship foundered in the North Sea with the loss of thirteen of the 25 people on board. Survivors were rescued by the brig Harmony ( Wismar). Colonist was on a voyage from Copenhagen, Denmark, to Hull, Yorkshire.
Comet	United Kingdom	The barque was driven ashore and wrecked at Garrucha, Spain.
Cora	United Kingdom	The ship ran aground on the Scull Martin Rocks, off the coast of County Down. She was on a voyage from Greenock, Renfrewshire to St. Jago de Cuba, Cuba. She was refloated on 19 September and taken in to the Belfast Lough. Subsequently towed in to Liverpool, Lancashire.
Destiny	(United Kingdom of Great Britain and Ireland) Gibraltar	The ship struck rocks at Point de Cruses, Morocco, became waterlogged and was abandoned. Her ten crew were rescued by the felucca Isabelita (Spain). Destiny was on a voyage from Gibraltar to Genoa, Italy. The wreck was plundered by three Spanish vessels.

== 17 September ==
List of shipwrecks: 17 September 1861
Ship	State	Description
Cadiz	United Kingdom	The brig was driven ashore at Veere, Zeeland, Netherlands. She was on a voyage from Newcastle upon Tyne, Northumberland, to Rotterdam, South Holland. She was later refloated and taken in to Vlissingen, Zeeland.
Ceneus	United Kingdom	The snow sank in the English Channel off Dover, Kent. Her six crew were rescued by Ceres (United Kingdom). Ceneus was on a voyage from Schiedam, South Holland, to Sunderland, County Durham.
Friedrich Wilhelm	Prussia	The ship was driven ashore at Barrow in Furness, Lancashire, United Kingdom. She was on a voyage from Memel to Gloucester, United Kingdom. She was consequently condemned.
Hilton	United Kingdom	The ship caught fire at London.
Jonge Johan	Netherlands	The ship was driven ashore on Terschelling, Friesland. Her crew were rescued. She was on a voyage from Hamburg to Amsterdam, North Holland.
Margaretha	Netherlands	The ship foundered off the coast of South Holland with the loss of a crew member.
Marina	United Kingdom	The barque was wrecked 7 nautical miles (13 km) west of the Manora Point Lighthouse, Kurrachee India. Her thirteen crew were rescued. She was on a voyage from Sunderland to Kurrachee.

== 18 September ==
List of shipwrecks: 18 September 1861
Ship	State	Description
Anna Christina Haab	Netherlands	The ship was wrecked on the Hinder Bank, in the North Sea off the Dutch coast. Her crew were rescued.
Firefly	United Kingdom	The smack was run down and sunk in the North Sea off the coast of Yorkshire by the steamship Lubana (United Kingdom). At least seven of the twelve people on board survived.
Leda	United Kingdom	The brig was beached in the Humber. She was later refloated and towed in to Grimsby, Lincolnshire.
Maid of the Mist	United States	The 40-ton sidewheel paddle steamer foundered in the Ohio River at Evansville, Indiana.
Melbourne	United Kingdom	The brig was abandoned in the Atlantic Ocean. Her crew were rescued by Normand (France). Melbourne was on a voyage from Puerto Rico to London.
Sao Paolo	Italy	The brig caught fire and was scuttled in Gibraltar Bay. She was later refloated.

== 19 September ==
List of shipwrecks: 19 September 1861
Ship	State	Description
Guilaume	France	The ship was wrecked on the Lemon Sand, in the North Sea.
Rose	United Kingdom	The steamship was driven ashore in the River Foyle. She was on a voyage from Londonderry to Glasgow, Renfrewshire.

== 20 September ==
List of shipwrecks: 20 September 1861
Ship	State	Description
Eliza	United Kingdom	The ship was abandoned at sea. Her twelve crew were rescued by Gefion (Sweden) and a Danish vessel. Eliza was on a voyage from Danzig to London.
Margaretha	Netherlands	The ship foundered 18 nautical miles (33 km) east of Skagen, Denmark. Her crew survived. She was on a voyage from Gävle, Sweden, to Groningen.
Rolling Wave	United Kingdom	The ship was wrecked at Mazatlan, Cuba.
HMIS Semiramis	Her Majesty's Indian Navy	The ship was wrecked on Johanna Island, Comoros Islands.
Timandra	United Kingdom	The ship was driven ashore on Itaparica Island, Brazil. She was on a voyage from Cardiff, Glamorgan, to Bahia, Brazil.

== 21 September ==
List of shipwrecks: 21 September 1861
Ship	State	Description
Red Jacket	United Kingdom	The ship ran aground in the Hooghly River. She was on a voyage from Calcutta, India, to Réunion. She was refloated and resumed her voyage.
Saxon	(United Kingdom of Great Britain and Ireland) British North America	The ship ran aground and sank near Cape Gurupe, Brazil. Her crew survived. She was on a voyage from Grimsby, Lincolnshire, to Pará, Brazil.

== 22 September ==
List of shipwrecks: 22 September 1861
Ship	State	Description
Doncaster	United Kingdom	The brig ran aground on the Longsand, in the North Sea off the coast of Essex. She was refloated and assisted in to Harwich, Essex.
Orion	Denmark	The brig was wrecked in the Orksen Islands, China with the loss of two of her crew. She was on a voyage from Foo Chow Foo to Shanghai.

== 23 September ==
List of shipwrecks: 23 September 1861
Ship	State	Description
Beacon	United Kingdom	The ship was driven ashore near Nyhamn, Sweden. She was on a voyage from Sunderland, County Durham to Swinemünde, Prussia.
Cereal	United Kingdom	The barque ran aground on the Goodwin Sands, Kent, United Kingdom. She was on a voyage from Dunkirk, Nord to New York, United States. She was refloated with assistance from the tug Vulcan and the Broadstairs, Deal and Ramsgate Lifeboats (all United Kingdom) and towed in to Ramsgate, Kent.
Liberty	United Kingdom	The schooner was driven ashore at Whitehaven, Cumberland.
Phoenix	United Kingdom	The ship departed from Montreal, Province of Canada, British North America for Londonderry. No further trace, presumed foundered with the loss of all hands.
Popplewell	United Kingdom	The schooner was driven ashore at Whitehaven.
Sovereign of the Seas	United Kingdom	The ship caught fire at Sydney, New South Wales and was scuttled.
Stentor	United Kingdom	The ship was wrecked at North Cape, Prince Edward Island, British North America.
William	United Kingdom	The schooner was driven ashore at Whitehaven.

== 24 September ==
List of shipwrecks: 24 September 1861
Ship	State	Description
Jonge Jacob	Netherlands	The ship ran aground on the Lemon and Ower Sands, in the North Sea. She was on a voyage from Newcastle upon Tyne, Northumberland, United Kingdom to Genoa, Italy. She was refloated and put in to Grimsby, Lincolnshire, United Kingdom in a leaky condition.
Shark	United Kingdom	The ship was wrecked in the Congo River.

== 25 September ==
List of shipwrecks: 25 September 1861
Ship	State	Description
Ophelia	United Kingdom	The brig was abandoned in the North Sea with the loss of one of her seven crew. She was on a voyage from Gävle, Sweden, to Stockton-on-Tees, County Durham.
Racehorse	United Kingdom	The lugger was run down and sunk off Cromer, Norfolk by the paddle tug Onward (United Kingdom). Her crew were rescued by Onward.
Sir Isaac Newton	Hamburg	The barque heeled over at North Shields, Northumberland, United Kingdom. She was later righted.

== 26 September ==
List of shipwrecks: 26 September 1861
Ship	State	Description
Cavalier	United Kingdom	The ship ran aground in the River Mersey. She was on a voyage from Saint John, New Brunswick, British North America to Liverpool, Lancashire. She was refloated and taken in to the Sloyne.
Henry Clay	United Kingdom	The ship was driven ashore and wrecked on Islay, Inner Hebrides. All on board were rescued. She was on a voyage from Liverpool to New York, United States.
William Barker	United States	The ship sprang a leak and foundered off Tory Island, County Donegal, United Kingdom. She was on a voyage from Troon, Ayrshire, United Kingdom to Genoa, Italy.

== 27 September ==
List of shipwrecks: 27 September 1861
Ship	State	Description
Jeremiah Thompson	United Kingdom	The ship was driven ashore near Liverpool, Lancashire, United Kingdom. She was refloated.
Lady Mansell	(United Kingdom of Great Britain and Ireland) Guernsey	The schooner was driven ashore and wrecked at Portscatho, Cornwall. She was on a voyage from Guernsey to Cardiff, Glamorgan.
Minnesota	United States	The 749-ton sidewheel paddle steamer was stranded at Green Bay, Wisconsin.
Orderly	United Kingdom	The fishing trawler was run into by an American ship and sank off the coast of Cornwall. Her crew were rescued by another trawler.
St. Patrick	United Kingdom	The Mersey Flat was driven ashore and damaged at Warrenpoint, County Down.
Wharfinger	United Kingdom	The schooner was wrecked on the Doom Bar.

== 28 September ==
List of shipwrecks: 28 September 1861
Ship	State	Description
Arnold	Prussia	The schooner was wrecked at Wick, Caithness, United Kingdom with the loss of all seven crew. She was on a voyage from Leith, Lothian, to Wick.
Glasgow	United Kingdom	The schooner was driven ashore in Dundrum Bay. She was on a voyage from Wick to Ballywalter, County Down.
Hydrus	United Kingdom	The schooner sprang a leak and was abandoned in the English Channel off St Alban's Head, Dorset. Her crew survived. She was on a voyage from Middlesbrough, Yorkshire, to Exeter, Devon.
Mary Ann	United Kingdom	The full-rigged ship was driven ashore near Ballywalter.
Mechanic	United Kingdom	The ship was driven ashore at Kronstadt, Russia. She was on a voyage from Newcastle upon Tyne, Northumberland, to Kronstadt. She was refloated the next day and take in to Kronstadt.
M. H. Sheldon	United States	Carrying a cargo of coal, the schooner was wrecked on Block Island off the coast of Rhode Island.
Neva	United Kingdom	The steamship was run into by the steamship H. L. Hvindt (Denmark) and sank in the Kattegat. Her crew were rescued by H. L. Hvindt. Neva was on a voyage from Hull, Yorkshire, to Saint Petersburg, Russia.
Ocean Skimmer	United Kingdom	The ship was driven ashore at Kronstadt. She was on a voyage from Sunderland, County Durham to Kronstadt. She was refloated the next day and taken in to Kronstadt.
Peace	United Kingdom	The sailing barge ran aground and was abandoned off Camber, Sussex. Both crew were rescued by the Rye Lifeboat. Peace was on a voyage from London to Rye, Sussex. She subsequently sank.

== 29 September ==
List of shipwrecks: 29 September 1861
Ship	State	Description
Alice	United Kingdom	The derelict schooner was taken in to Hellesund, Norway.
Joseph Park	United States	American Civil War: The 244-ton brigantine was used for target practice and burned in the Atlantic Ocean off Brazil by the merchant raider CSS Sumter (Confederate States Navy). Sumter had captured her on 25 or 28 September (sources disagree).

== 30 September ==
List of shipwrecks: 30 September 1861
Ship	State	Description
Anagance	United Kingdom	The ship departed from New York, United States for Dunkirk, Nord, France. No further trace, presumed foundered with the loss of all hands.
Aristide	Flag unknown	The ship sank in the Danube at Sulina, Ottoman Empire.
Couva	United Kingdom	The ship departed from New York for Londonderry. No further trace, presumed foundered with the loss of all hands.
George	United States	The full-rigged ship was driven ashore at Walmer Castle, Kent, United Kingdom. She was on a voyage from Antwerp, Belgium, to New York.
Malay	United Kingdom	The barque was wrecked on a reef off "Dunniloff Island", in the White Sea. Her crew were rescued by the brig Caledonia (United Kingdom). Malay was on a voyage from Arkhangelsk, Russia, to Dundee, Forfarshire.
Rose	Norway	The ship was wrecked at Whaligoe, Caithness, United Kingdom with the loss of all four crew.

== Unknown date ==
List of shipwrecks: Unknown date September 1861
Ship	State	Description
Addie	United Kingdom	The snow was wrecked at Lisbon, Portugal. She was on a voyage from Lisbon to Pernambuco, Brazil.
Ann Jane	(United Kingdom of Great Britain and Ireland) New Zealand	The schooner hit the Molyneux bar at the mouth of the Clutha River, New Zealand.
Armada	Spain	The ship was driven ashore near Ceuta. She was on a voyage from Hartlepool, County Durham, United Kingdom to Genoa, Italy.
Azoff	Russia	The ship sank at Kronstadt before 19 September. She was on a voyage from Liverpool, Lancashire, United Kingdom to Kronstadt.
Cheshire	United Kingdom	The ship was driven ashore at "Melancholy Point".
Coquette	United States	The schooner went ashore on the bar at Port Hood, Nova Scotia and became a total wreck. Crew saved.
Diston	United Kingdom	The ship struck a rock and was abandoned.
E. K. Kane	United States	The schooner went ashore at Liverpool, Nova Scotia and became a total wreck. Crew saved.
Hampton	United Kingdom	The barque was abandoned in the Atlantic Ocean before 23 September. She was on a voyage from Quebec City, Province of Canada, British North America to Newcastle upon Tyne, Northumberland.
Helen	United Kingdom	The brig was wrecked at Garmouth, Morayshire. Her crew survived.
Jason	United Kingdom	The ship foundered in the North Sea. She was on a voyage from Rotterdam, South Holland, Netherlands to Goole, Yorkshire.
Leonidas	United Kingdom	The ship ran aground at Frederikshavn, Denmark, before 3 September. She was on a voyage from Saint Petersburg, Russia, to Hartlepool. She broke in two on 30 September.
Lion Belge	Belgium	The ship was wrecked. She was on a voyage from Leith, Lothian, United Kingdom to Sydney, New South Wales.
Persevere	Unknown	The full-rigged ship was lost in the Pacific Ocean 40 nautical miles (74 km; 46 mi) off Cape Flattery on the coast of Washington Territory.
Prince Arthur	United Kingdom	The ship was abandoned in the Atlantic Ocean. She was on a voyage from Quebec City to Liverpool, Lancashire.
Republic	United States	The schooner went ashore at Ragged Island and became a total wreck. Crew saved.
Salem	United Kingdom	The barque departed from Quebec City for Belfast, County Antrim. Presumed subsequently foundered with the loss of all hand; her longboat was discovered in the Atlantic Ocean.
San Paolo	Italy	The ship caught fire and was beached in Gibraltar Bay. She was on a voyage from Hull, Yorkshire, to Genoa.
Telemaco	Russia	The steamship foundered west of Málaga, Spain, before 8 September with the loss of all but one of her crew.
Towns (or W. W. Townes)	Confederate States of America	American Civil War: The 89-ton sidewheel paddle steamer was scuttled as a blockship in the Warwick River in Virginia.
