= John o' Groats =

Village in Highland, Scotland

Coordinates: 58°38′14″N 3°04′08″W

John o' Groats: Scottish Gaelic: Taigh Iain Ghròta
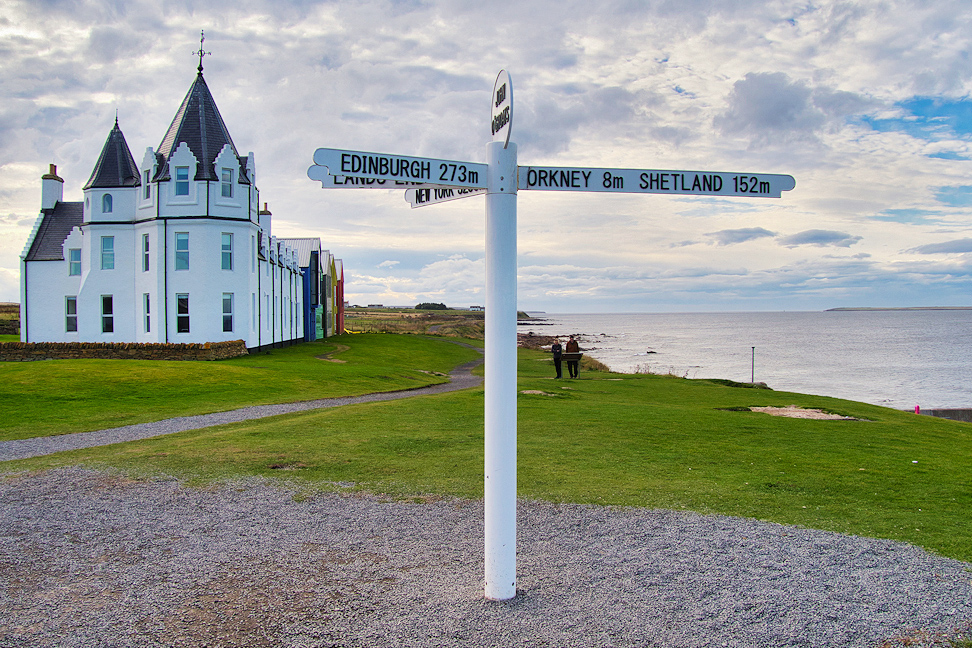
- John o' Groats House Hotel and signpost

- Location within the Caithness area
- Population: 300
- OS grid reference: ND380734
- Council area: Highland
- Lieutenancy area: Caithness
- Country: Scotland
- Sovereign state: United Kingdom
- Post town: WICK
- Postcode district: KW1
- Dialling code: 01955
- Police: Scotland
- Fire: Scottish
- Ambulance: Scottish
- UK Parliament: Caithness, Sutherland and Easter Ross
- Scottish Parliament: Caithness, Sutherland and Ross

John o' Groats (Scottish Gaelic: Taigh Iain Ghròta) is a village 2 1/2 miles (4 kilometres) northeast of Canisbay, in the historic county of Caithness, Scotland. It lies on Scotland's north-eastern tip and is popular with tourists. The northernmost point of mainland Scotland is nearby Dunnet Head and the northeastern corner is nearby Duncansby Head.

John o' Groats is sited 690 mi (1,110 km) from London, 280 mi (450 km) from Edinburgh, 6 mi (10 km) from the Orkney Isles and 2,200 mi (3,500 km) from the North Pole; it is 4 1/4 mi (7 km) from the uninhabited Island of Stroma.

In summer, a ferry operates between John o' Groats and Burwick on South Ronaldsay in Orkney.

== Name ==
The settlement takes its name from Jan de Groot, a 15th-century Dutchman who once plied a ferry from the Scottish mainland to Orkney, which had recently been acquired from Norway by King James IV. Local legend has that the "o' Groats" refers to John's charge of one groat for use of his ferry, but it actually derives from the Dutch de groot, meaning "the large". People from John o' Groats are known as "Groaters".

The name John o' Groats has a particular resonance because it is often used as a starting or ending point for cycles, walks, and charitable events to and from Land's End (at the extreme south-western tip of the Cornish peninsula in England). The phrase Land's End to John o' Groats is frequently heard. Also, for many years, it was the northern terminal of the A9 trunk road, which now ends at Scrabster. The longest journey possible in the UK is however Lands End to Duncansby Head, 2 miles to the east of John o' Groats.

== Demography ==
In 2007, the population of John o' Groats was about 300. The village is dispersed, but has a linear centre with council housing, sports park, and a shop, which is on the main road from the nearest town of Wick.

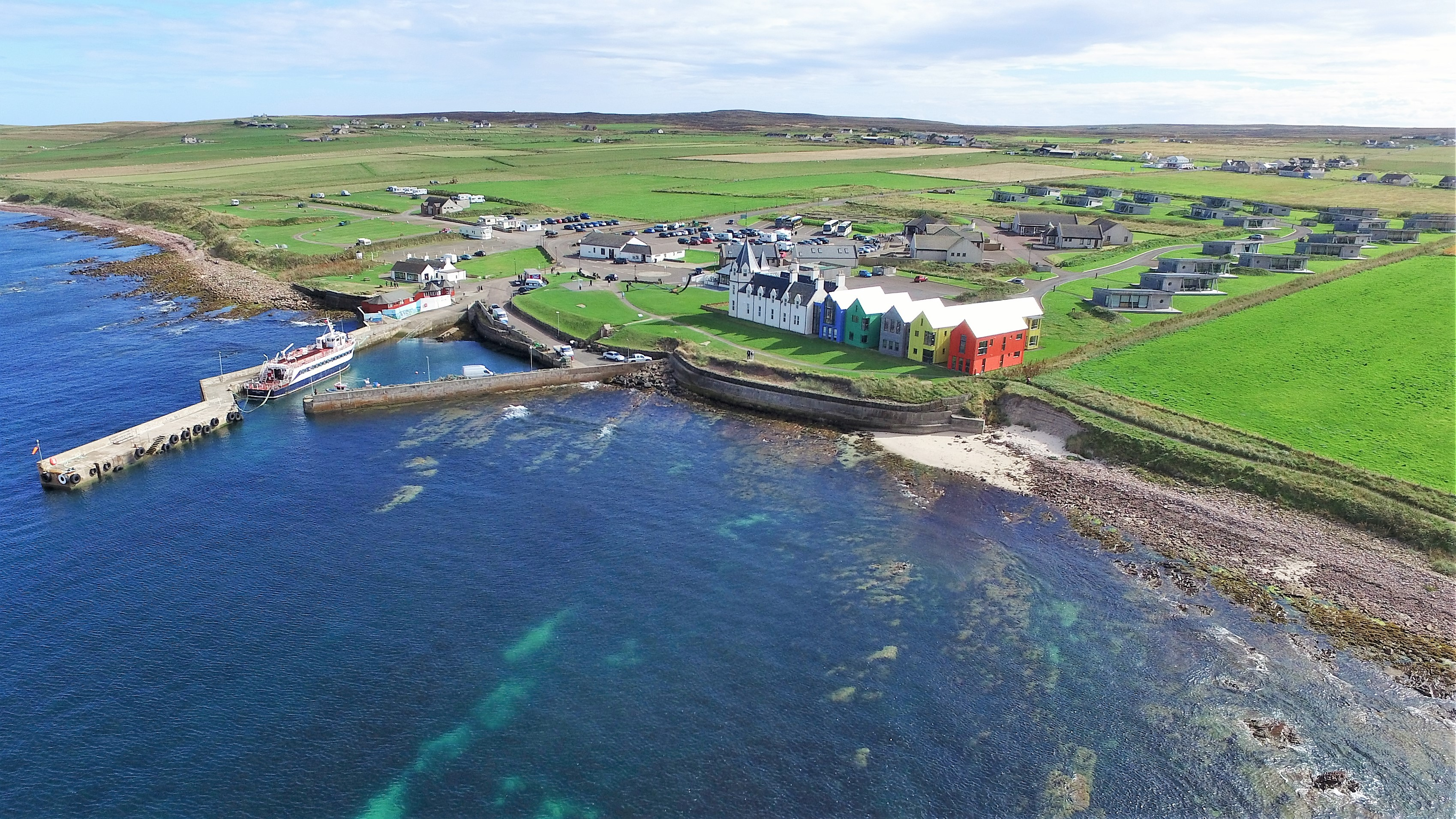
Aerial view

== Tourism ==
John o' Groats attracts large numbers of tourists from across the world all year round. In 2005, a popular tourist guide, Lonely Planet, described the village as a "seedy tourist trap"; in 2010, John o' Groats received a Carbuncle Award from Urban Realm magazine for being "Scotland's most dismal town". The completion of major redevelopment work in 2013 aimed to revitalise the area.

John o' Groats lies at the end of the 14th stage of the John o' Groats Trail, a long-distance walking trail from Inverness to John o' Groats.

=== Hotel ===
The John o' Groats House Hotel was built on or near the site of Jan de Groot's house and was established in 1875. It has been described by Highlands and Islands Labour MSP Rhoda Grant as "one of the UK's most famous landmarks". It was closed for several years and fell into disrepair, until undergoing a radical transformation by Edinburgh-based architects GLM for self-catering holiday specialists Natural Retreats. It reopened for business in August 2013.

John o' Groat's House was an ancient house believed to be situated in front of the present hotel; it was marked with a flagpole now removed, deriving its name from John of Groat, or Groot, and his brothers, originally from the Netherlands, said to have settled here about 1489. The house was of an octagon shape, being one room, with eight windows and eight doors, to admit eight members of the family; the heads of different branches of it, to prevent their quarrels for precedence at table. Each came in by this contrivance at his own door and sat at an octagon table, at which, of course, there was no chief place or head.

—Haydn's Dictionary of Dates

=== Signpost ===
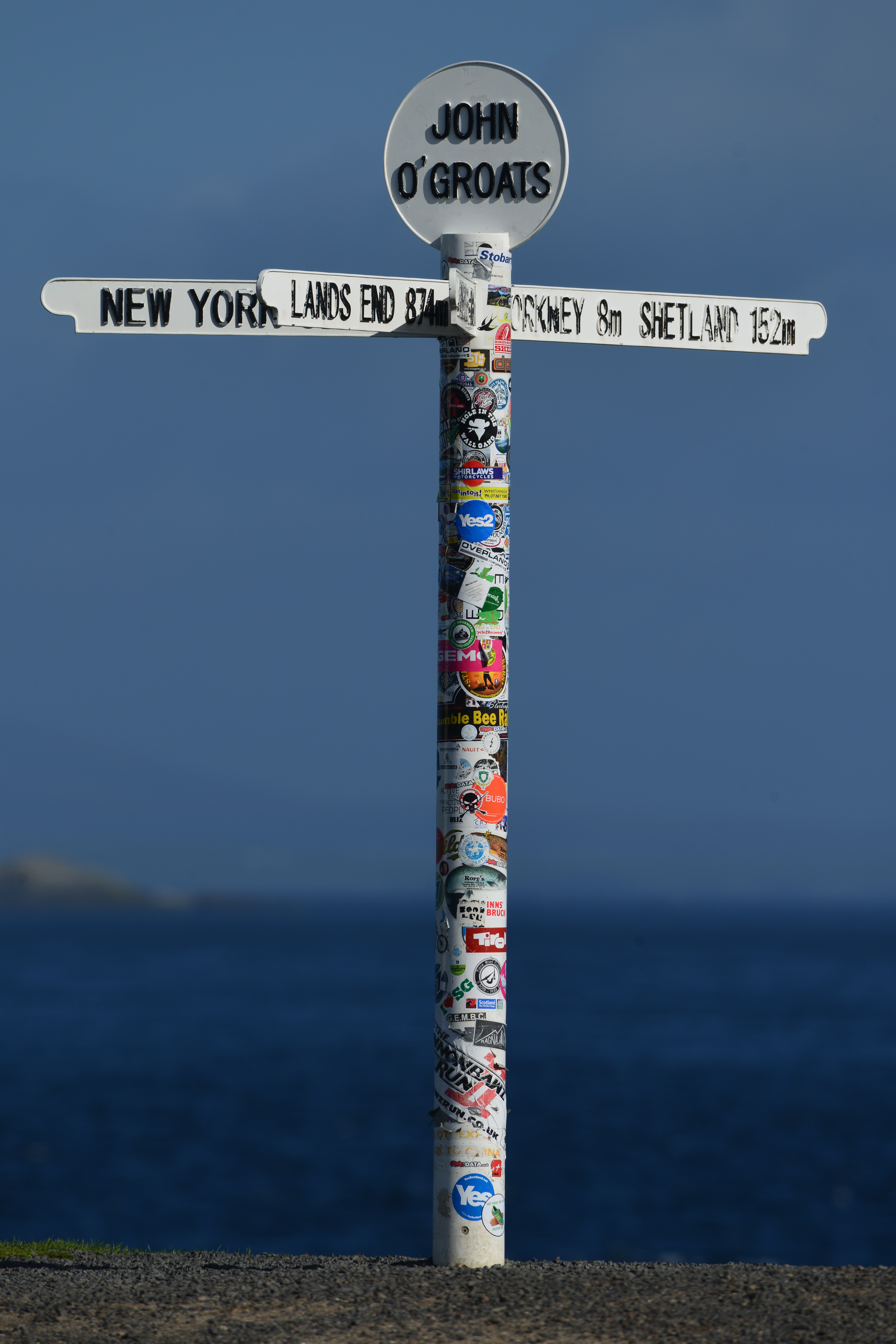
The free signpost

The landmark Journey's End signpost at John o' Groats was installed in 1964 on private land and operated as a visitor attraction by a Penzance-based photography company that also operates its counterpart at Land's End. Visitors paid a fee for a photograph of themselves next to the signpost, displaying either a message or the date and distance to a location of their choice.

The original site was bought in 2013, as part of the hotel redevelopment, and the signpost was moved to a caravan park 200 yd (180 m) away. When the hotel reopened, a publicly accessible signpost was erected at the original site, without customisable text.

== Transport ==
Local bus services are operated by Stagecoach Highlands and Aaron's of Wick; routes connect the area to Wick, Thurso and Dounreay.

The nearest National Rail Station is at Wick. The normal weekday service is four trains per day to Inverness, operated by ScotRail.

== Sport ==
John o' Groats FC plays in the Caithness Amateur Football Association.

== Book festival ==
The John O'Groat Book Festival was held for the first time in 2018. Since then, it has attracted authors such as Theresa Breslin and Christopher Brookmyre, as well as a number of local authors. The festival is held annually in April.

== Climate ==
Climate data for John O Groats (1968–1972 averages)
Month	Jan	Feb	Mar	Apr	May	Jun	Jul	Aug	Sep	Oct	Nov	Dec	Year
Mean daily maximum °C (°F)	6 (43)	7 (45)	8 (46)	10 (50)	12 (54)	14 (57)	16 (61)	16 (61)	14 (57)	12 (54)	9 (48)	7 (45)	11 (52)
Mean daily minimum °C (°F)	1 (34)	1 (34)	2 (36)	3 (37)	6 (43)	8 (46)	10 (50)	10 (50)	8 (46)	6 (43)	4 (39)	2 (36)	5 (41)
Average precipitation mm (inches)	96.0 (3.78)	78.8 (3.10)	84.7 (3.33)	57.3 (2.26)	52.5 (2.07)	58.8 (2.31)	62.4 (2.46)	72.9 (2.87)	95.4 (3.76)	116.4 (4.58)	117.6 (4.63)	96.8 (3.81)	989.6 (38.96)
Mean monthly sunshine hours	28.5	63.7	111.1	164.7	151.8	210.2	159.7	146.0	116.2	83.0	44.7	27.8	1,307.4

== See also ==
- Land's End to John o' Groats
- Europa Point
