= Beinn Fhada =

Mountain in the Scottish Highlands

Coordinates: 57.22052°N 5.28439°W

- Ben Attow
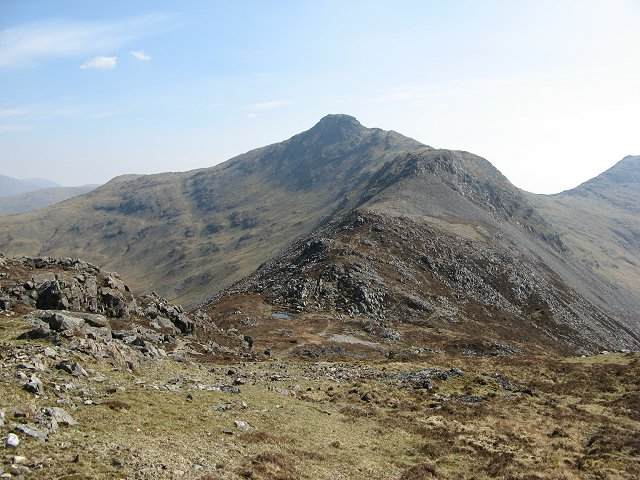
- Beinn Fhada from the north

Highest point
- Elevation: 1,032 m (3,386 ft)
- Prominence: 647 m (2,123 ft)
- Parent peak: Carn Eige
- Listing: Marilyn, Munro

Naming
- English translation: Long Mountain
- Language of name: Scottish Gaelic
- Pronunciation: Scottish Gaelic: [peɲ ˈat̪ə] English approximation: bayn AT-ə

Geography
- Location: Highland, Scotland
- Parent range: Kintail
- OS grid: NH018192

Beinn Fhada (Scottish Gaelic for 'long mountain') or Ben Attow is a mountain in the Scottish Highlands.

The finest route up Beinn Fhada is from Morvich to the north-west. There is a direct line up a grassy, and rather boggy, slope from the east side of the River Croe. This leads eventually to a craggy and undulating ridge, which begins in a southerly direction over Sgurr a' Choire Ghairbh and then turns east across the wider expanse of the Plaide Mhòr to the summit. There is one short tricky section of downward scrambling on this ridge. An easy line of descent can be found, north-westwards from the summit, into Gleann Choinneachain. Total distance from Morvich is about 7 km, with around 1100 metres of ascent, including undulations.

Beinn Fhada has been dismissed by some guide writers as boring. It has two remarkable features: the Plaide Mor is the largest extent of ancient (preglacial) land surface to survive in the western Highlands, and is of Cairngorm character. Secondly, its SW slopes into Gleann Lichd are seamed for 3 km with trenches reaching 10m high and 800m long, a slope deformation that is the largest 'rock slope failure' in the Highlands.
