= Morvich, Highland =

Coordinates: 57.2316°N 5.38322°W

Morvich: Scottish Gaelic: A’ Mhormhaich
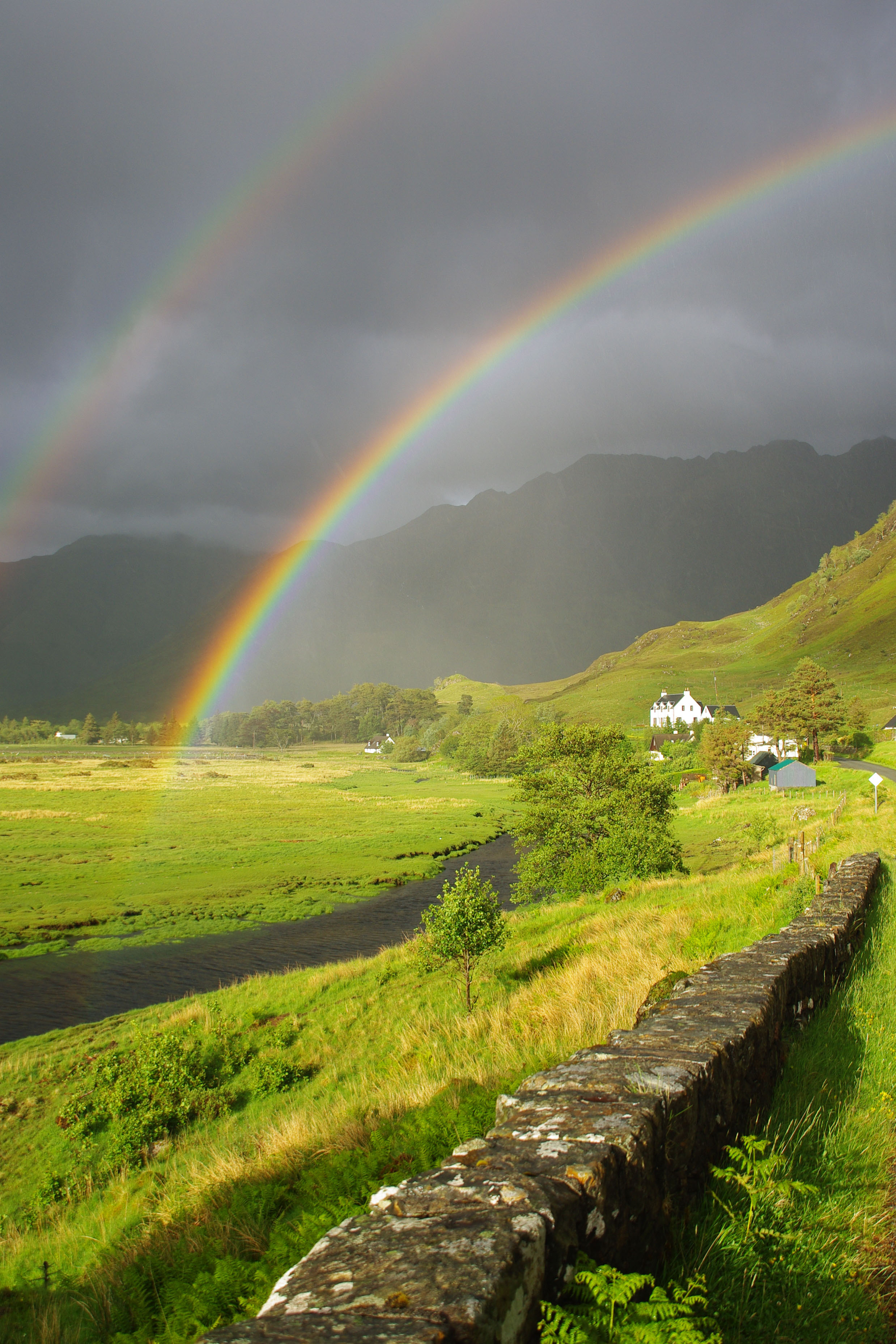
- Rainbow in Morvich

- Location within the Ross and Cromarty area
- OS grid reference: NG958207
- Council area: Highland
- Country: Scotland
- Sovereign state: United Kingdom
- Post town: Kyle
- Postcode district: IV40 8
- Police: Scotland
- Fire: Scottish
- Ambulance: Scottish

Morvich (Gaelic:A’ Mhormhaich) is a settlement in Glen Shiel near the southern end of Loch Duich, and to the north of Kintail, in Lochalsh, in the Highland council area of Scotland. The name "Morvich" may be from the Gaelic for "sea plain" or "the carse". This place is within the estate of Kintail & Morvich, owned by the National Trust for Scotland, they operate a countryside centre and an outdoor centre in Morvich. Morvich is also the location of the base for Kintail Mountain Rescue Team, as well a campsite operated by The Caravan Club.

The A87 road passes by Morvich, the village of Inverinate is located about 3 km west along the Loch Duich, while Shiel Bridge is about 2 km to the south west.

Morvich is a popular starting point for hiking. Routes include the mountains of the Five Sisters of Kintail and Beinn Fhada, as well as to the Falls of Glomach, one of the highest waterfalls in Scotland. A longer route is to hike from Morvich through to Glen Affric, via Gleann Chòinneachan or Gleann Lichd. The latter route is used by the Highland Cross, an annual duathlon from Morvich to Beauly, 50 miles away on the east coast.

Pollen analysis suggests the planting of oak on the alluvial land at Morvich in the middle of the fifth century, at a location where the species had not grown naturally for two millennia. The mature trees appear to have been clear-felled in a single act towards the end of the sixth century.

The ruins of St Dubhthach's Church are to the west of Morvich, next to the A87. This late medieval, gabled church was dedicated to the 11th century Bishop of Ross, Saint Duthac. The church was used as a hospital for wounded Jacobites after the Battle of Glenshiel, and was burned in retaliation by government troops. Next to the church is the Clachan Duich, the traditional burial ground of Clan Macrae. Adjacent is a steep mound featuring a Clan MacRae World War I Memorial at the top.

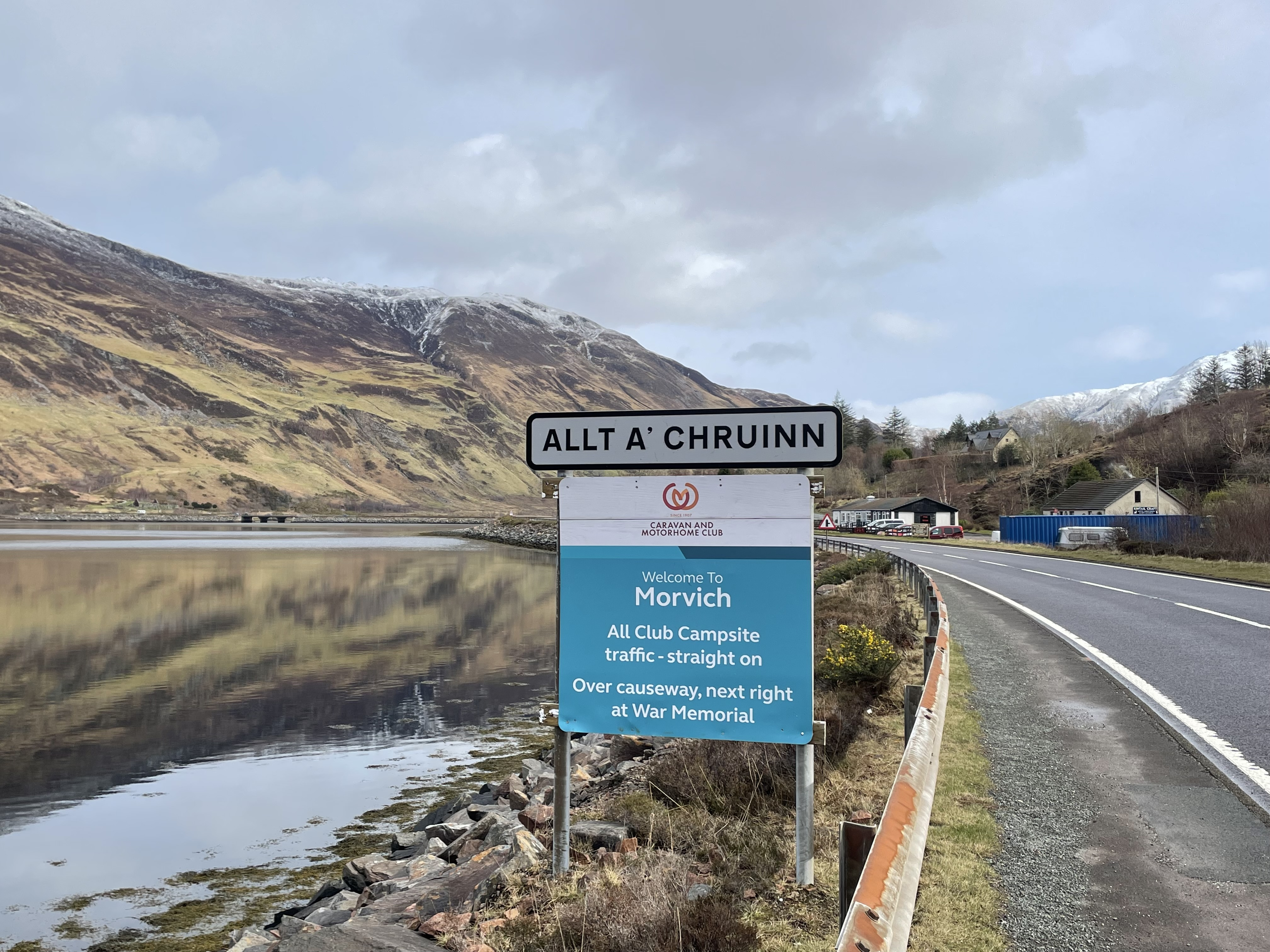
Morvich welcome sign on A87

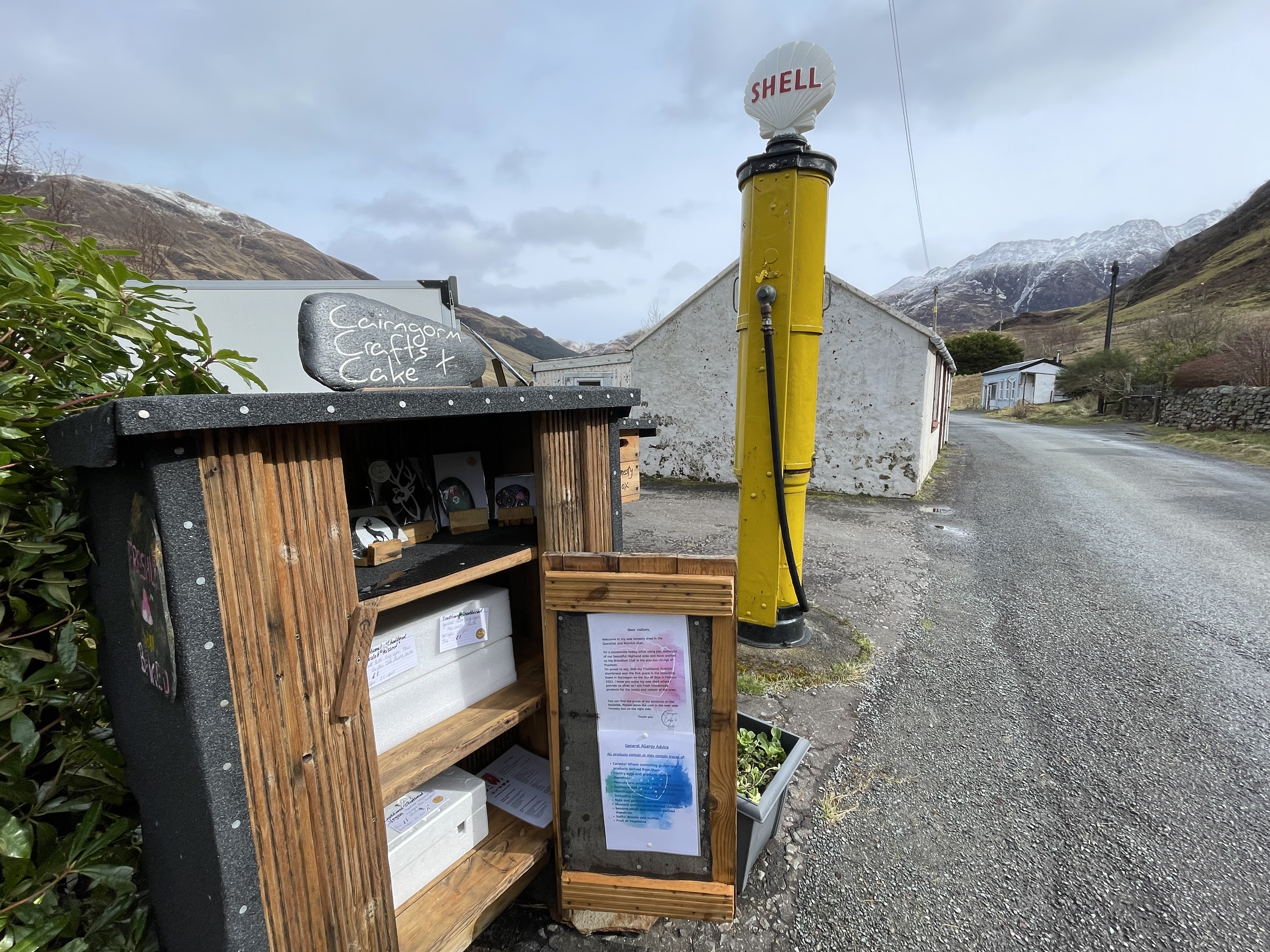
Honesty box and old gas pump

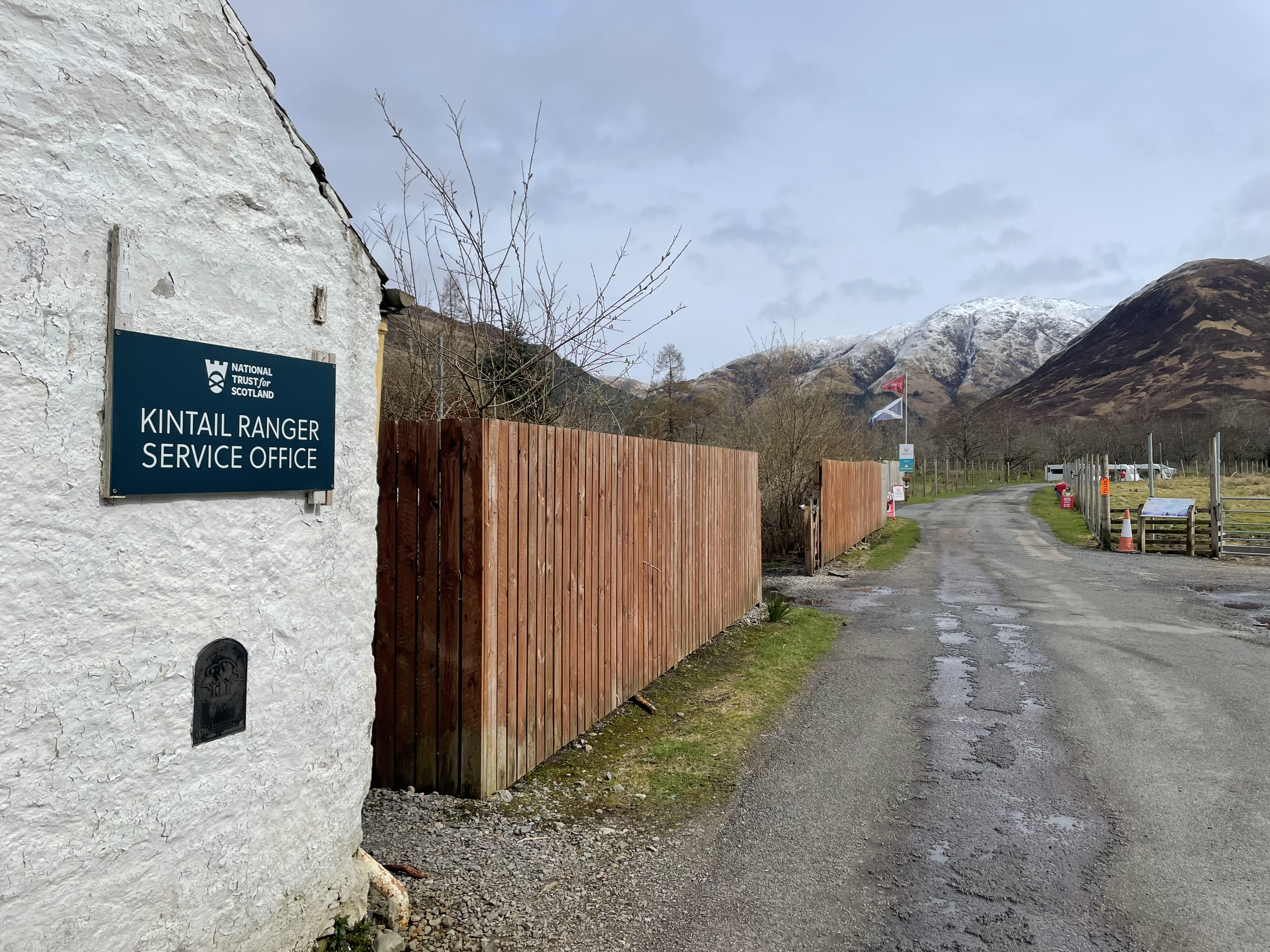
Kintail Ranger Service Office

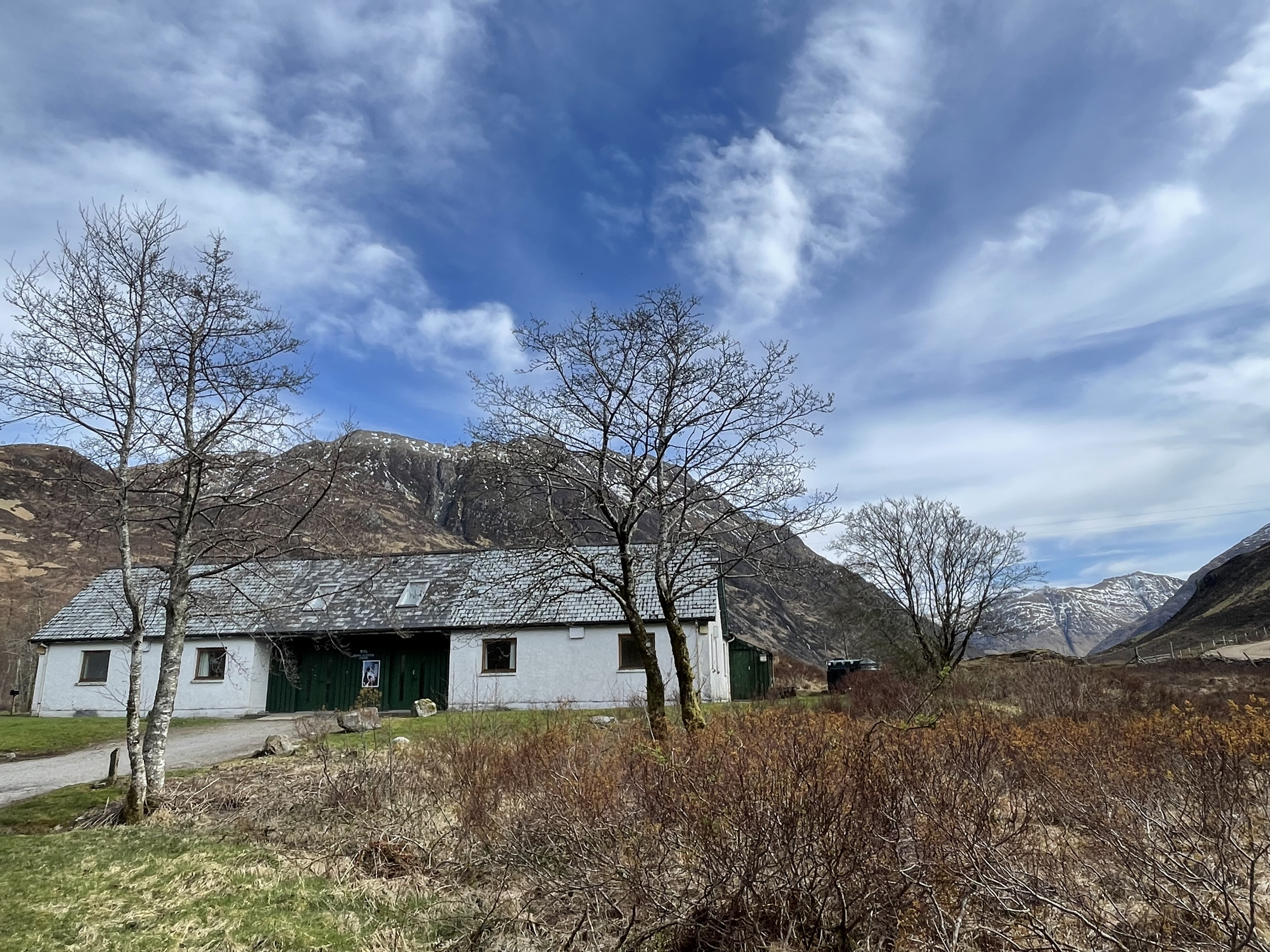
Kintail Outdoor Centre in Morvich

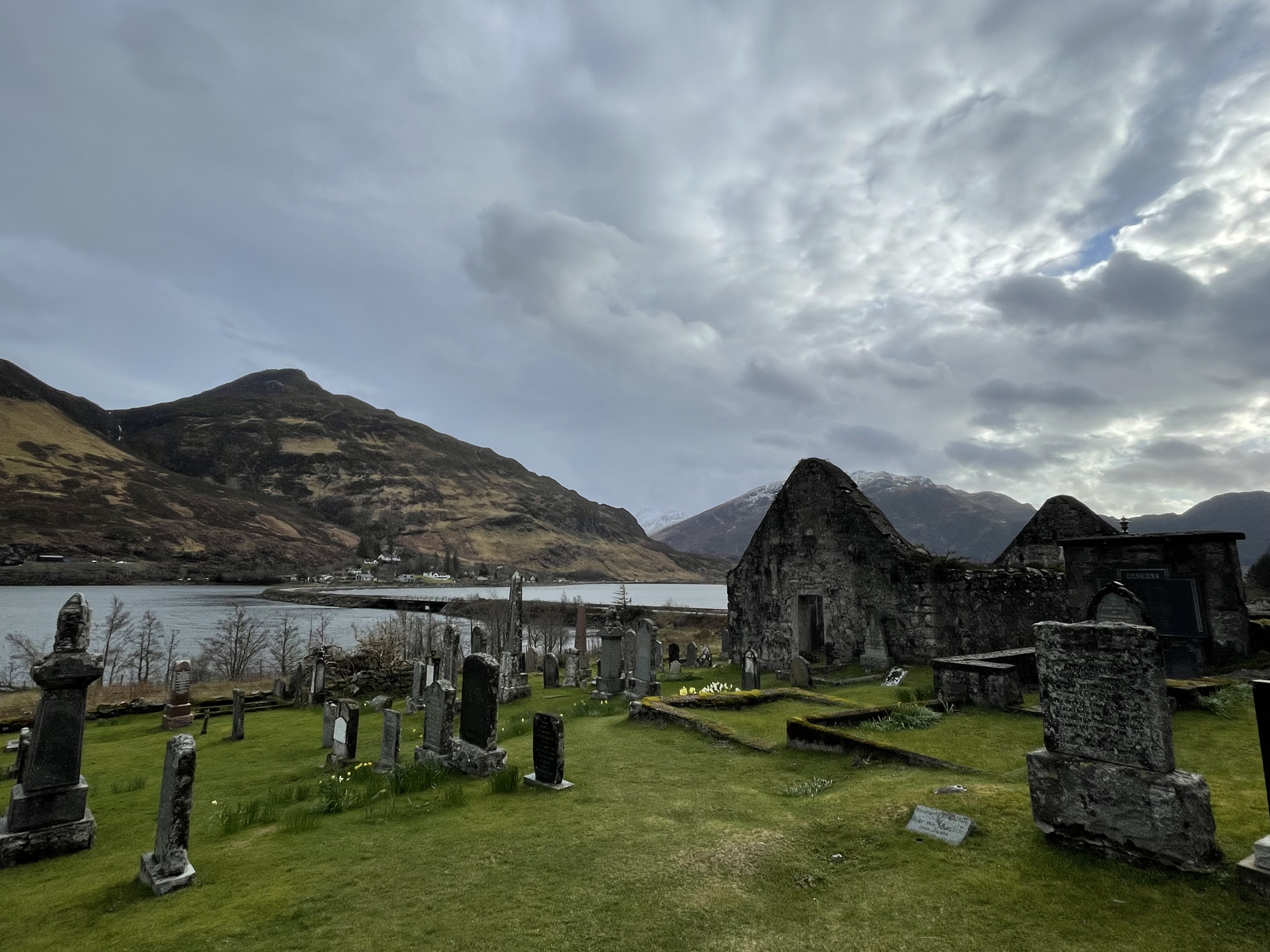
St Dubhthach’s Church

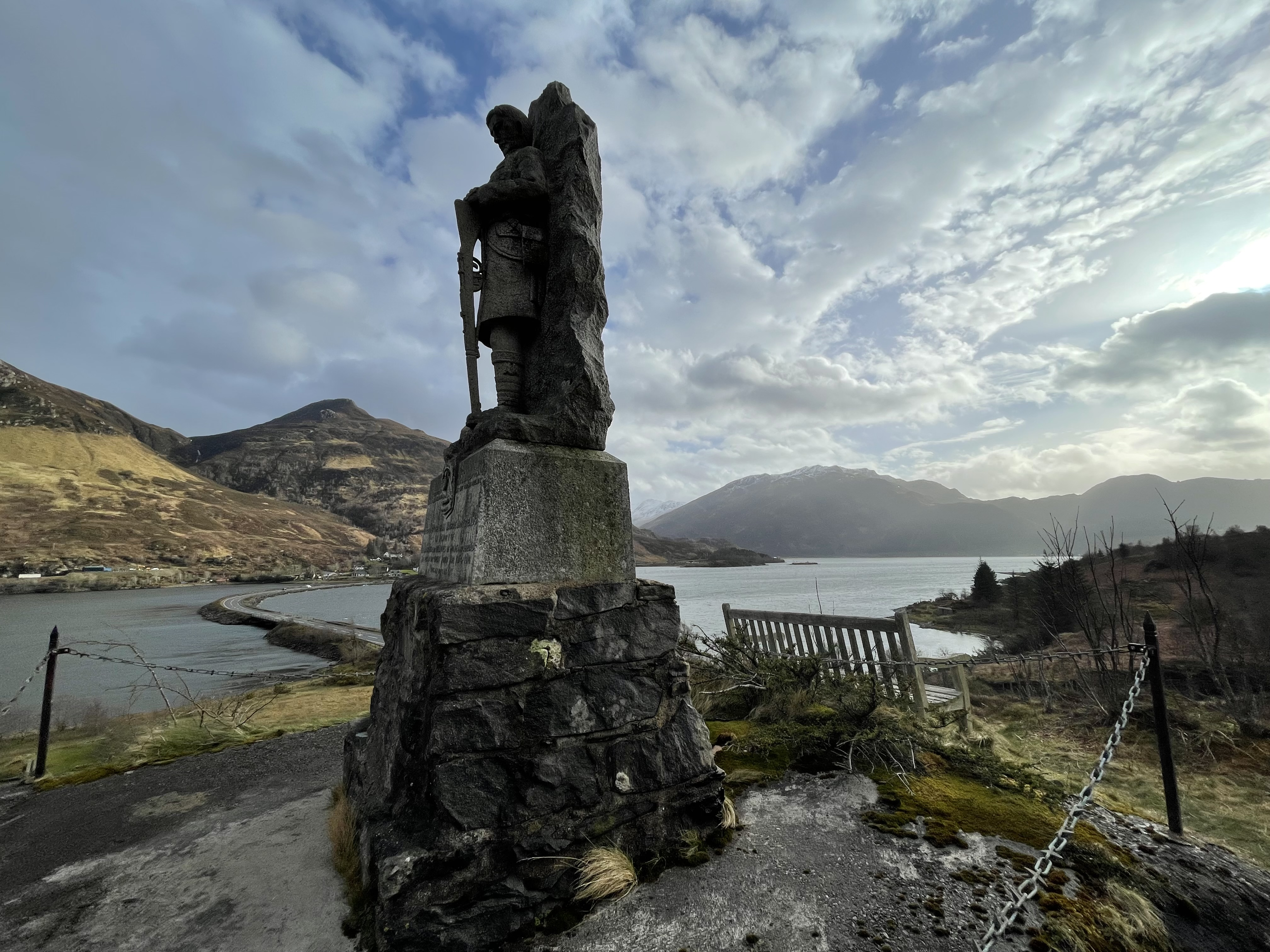
Clan MacRae World War I memorial
