= Cape Wrath Trail =

Hiking route in Scotland

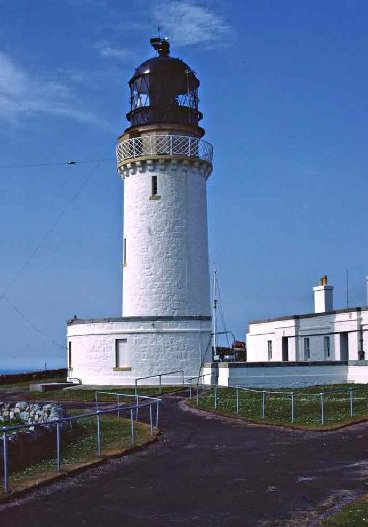
- Cape Wrath lighthouse, the final destination on the Cape Wrath Trail
- Length: 205 mi (330 km)
- Location: Scotland, United Kingdom
- Trailheads: Banavie (Fort William); 56.8444°N 5.0966°W; Cape Wrath; 58.6252°N 4.9990°W
- Use: Hillwalking, hiking, Munro bagging
- Elevation change: total climbed is 43,468 feet (13,249 m)
- Difficulty: Moderate to strenuous
- Season: All year
- Sights: Scottish Highlands
- Hazards: Severe weather, lack of facilities

Cape Wrath Trail is a hiking route that runs through the Scottish Highlands and along the west coast of Scotland between Fort William and Cape Wrath.

== Description ==
It is approximately 200 miles (321 km) in length and is considered to be one of the most challenging long distance walks in the UK. Despite not being an officially recognised National Trail it has grown to be one of the most highly regarded backpacking routes, attracting hikers from around the world.

The trek was pioneered in the early 1990s by David Paterson who published a detailed guidebook for the trail.

The trail begins in Fort William and ends at Cape Wrath lighthouse on the northwest tip of the Scottish mainland. It connects with the West Highland Way, North Highland Way and part of an alternative route suggested by Cameron McNeish which follows the Great Glen Way out of Fort William before joining the main route in Glen Shiel.

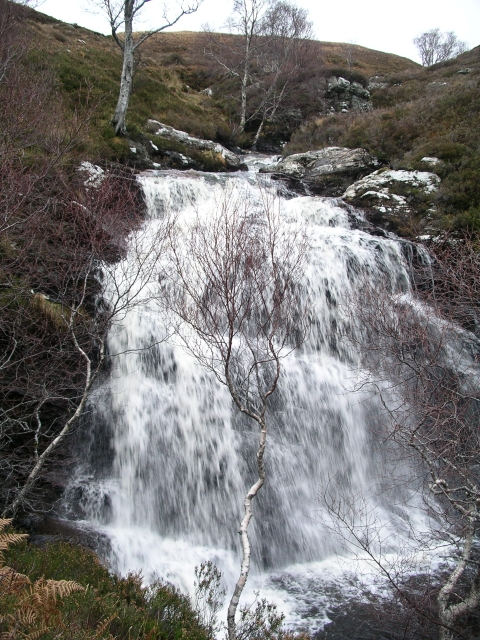
Waterfall, Allt an Duibhe. On the path going East from Dundonnell House towards Strath More.

An experienced walker should be able to traverse the entire route in less than 20 days. However there are slightly different routes and stages for walkers to follow. There are other alternatives on various segments of the route, thus there is yet to be an "official" established route. Many walkers see this variety as a quintessential part of the trail's appeal. The alternatives allow differing access to bothies, provisions, stream crossings and scenery.

Officially the trail is not endorsed by Scottish Natural Heritage and it is not waymarked or signposted. Facilities along the trail are also minimal and it covers some of the remotest parts of mainland Britain.

The Fastest Known Time (FKT) for the Cape Wrath Trail (following Iain Harper's Cicerone guidebook route) is 3 days, 13 hours and 39 minutes, set by ultra runner Tom Rainey (supported) in May 2024. In April 2026, ultramarathon champion David Parrish died near Kintail while attempting to beat the record.

== Locations on route ==
- Cape Wrath
- Dundonnell
- Durness
- Fort William
- Inchnadamph
- Inverie
- Kinlochewe
- Morar
- Rhiconich
- Shiel Bridge
- Strathcarron
- Ullapool

== Geographic features on route ==
- Beinne Eighe (Mountain and National Nature Reserve)
- Eas a' Chual Aluinn (Waterfall)
- Knoydart (Peninsula)
- Loch Duich
- Falls of Glomach (Waterfall)
- Sandwood Bay
- Torridon (Mountain range)
- An Teallach (Mountain)

== See also ==
- Caledonian Canal
- Cape Wrath
- Long Distance Routes
