= Ord of Caithness =

Headland in Scotland

- Headland
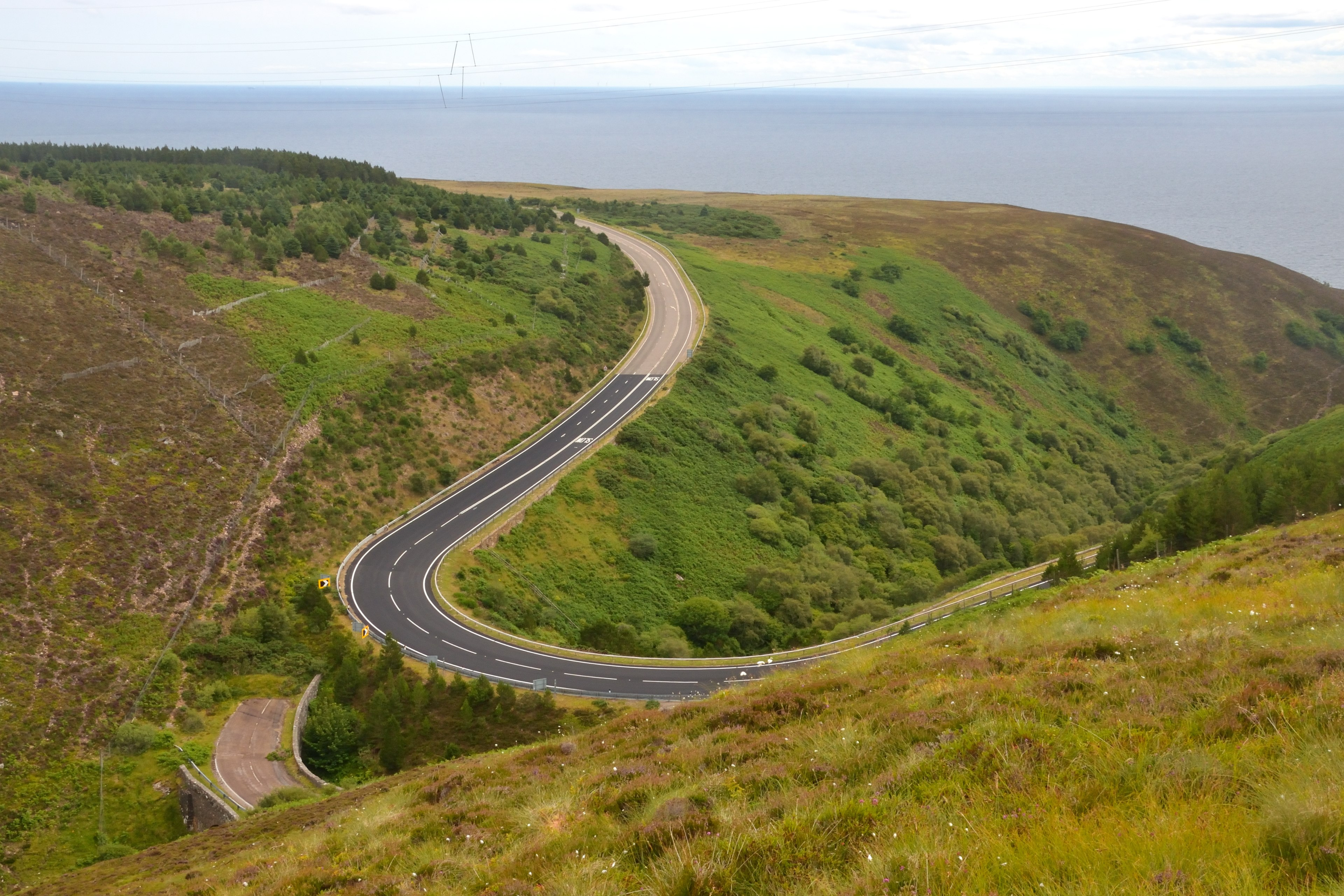
- The A9 road crossing the Ord

- Location in Scotland
- Coordinates: 58°8′22″N 3°36′15″W
- Grid position: ND 05649 17847
- Elevation: 198 m (650 ft)

The Ord of Caithness (Scottish Gaelic: An t-Òrd Gallach) is a granite mass on the east coast of the Highland council area of Scotland, on the boundary of the historic counties of Sutherland and Caithness. It is 2 miles (3.2 km) north-east of Helmsdale. It forms a headland 198 metres (650 ft) high, known as Ord Point. The A9 road passes above the Ord; there are sharp bends as it follows the contours.

== History ==
Historically, "the grim barrier of the Ord guaranteed its (i.e. Caithness's) isolation, and travellers who passed that way were greatly impressed by the experience." It was described in the 1880s: "The old road over it, formerly the only land ingress to Caithness, traversed the crest of its stupendous seaward precipices at a height and in a manner most appalling to both man and beast... even the present road, formed in 1811... has very stiff gradients." It is said to be fatally unlucky for any member of the Sinclair family to cross the Ord on a Monday, as this was the day on which the flower of the clan left Caithness for Flodden Field, never to return.

== Gallery ==
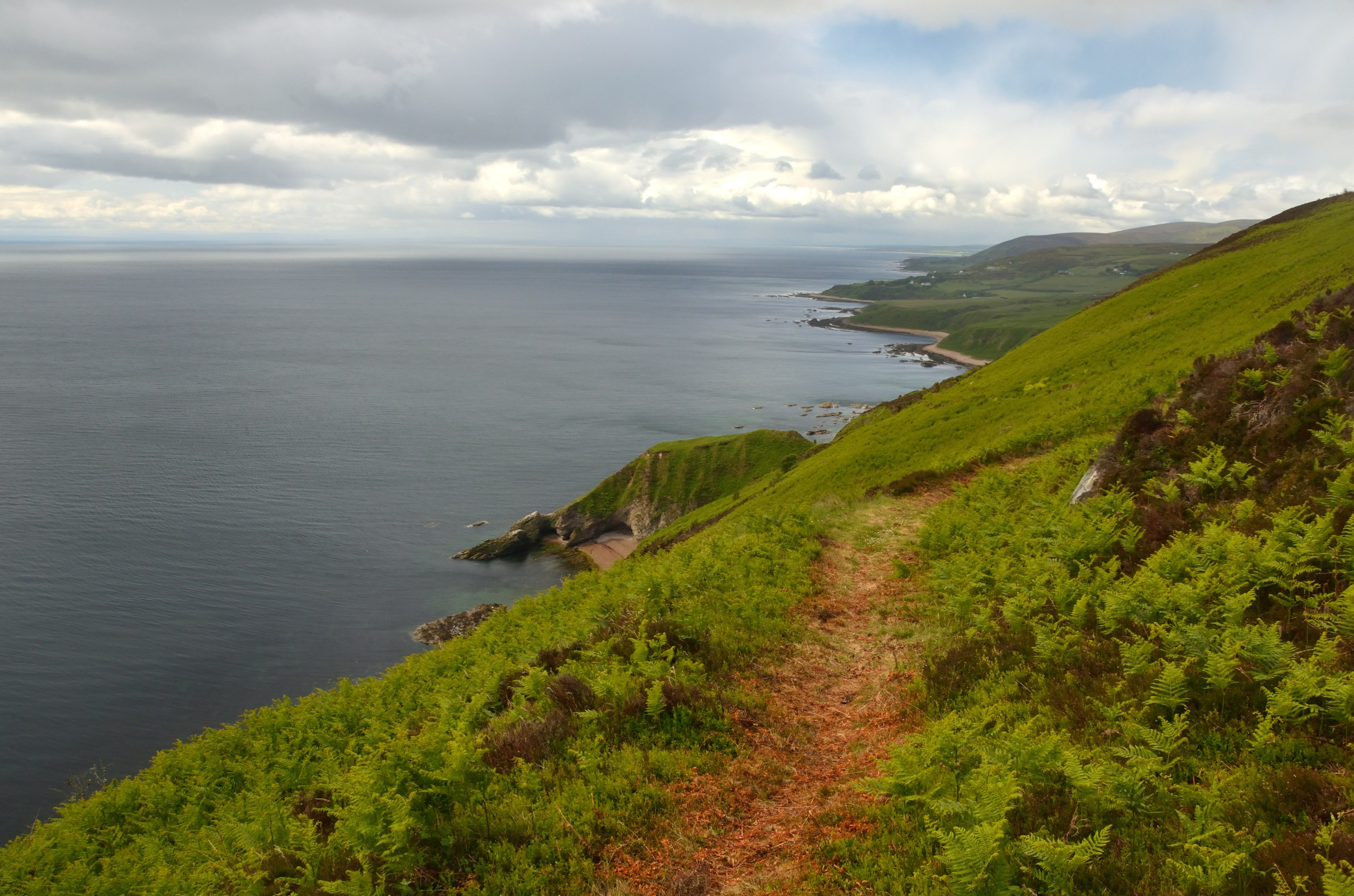
The old cliffside road, now part of the John o' Groats Trail

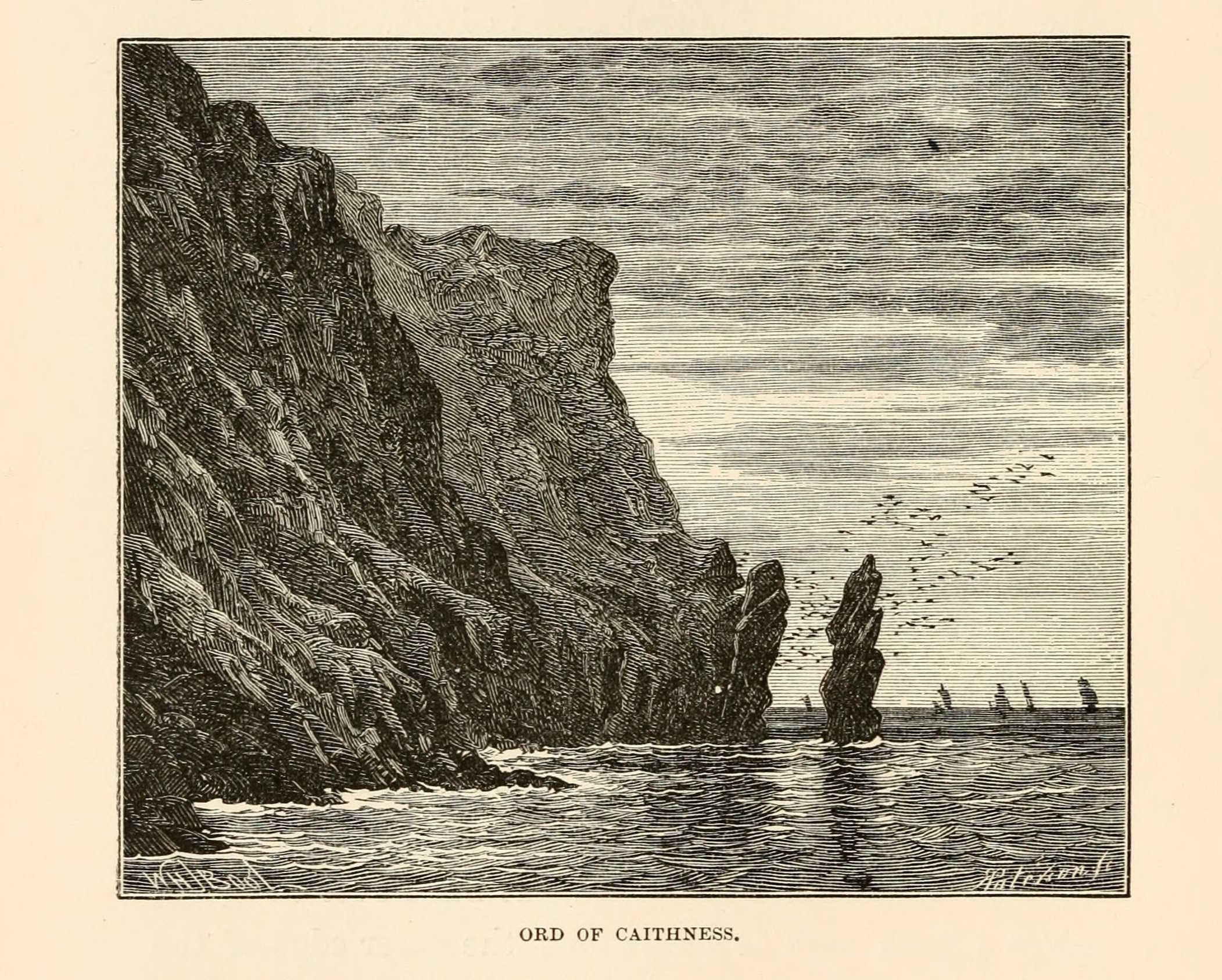
Seaward view of the Ord (1878)

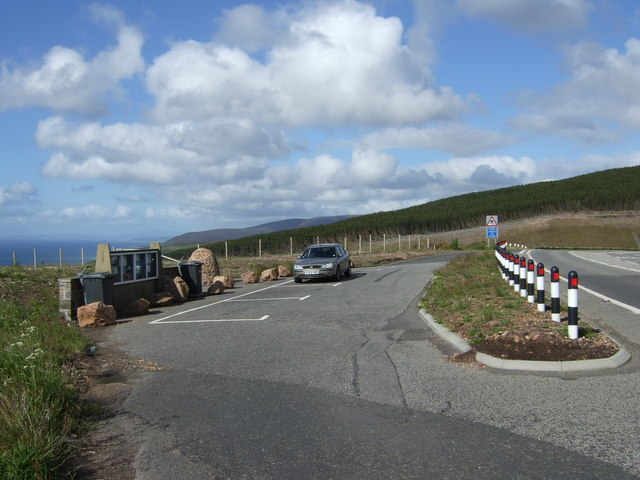
Ord of Caithness layby
