= Highland Cross =

Foot and cycle 50-mile race in Scotland

The Highland Cross is an annual charity race, established in 1983, across the Scottish Highlands by foot and bicycle from Morvich, Kintail in the west through Glen Affric and Strathglass to Beauly in the east. Although it is known as a duathlon, it does not use the three part, run-bike-run, format of the athletic event of this name governed by the International Triathlon Union.

The 50-mile duathlon (20 miles on foot, 30 miles on bicycle) is a sponsored race between teams of three to raise funds for causes that benefit local Highland people disadvantaged by disability, ill health or social need. In 2019, 735 competitors started the race, all but five completed it, and among the volunteers assisting were grandchildren of some of the original volunteers. In 2025, 736 participants competed.

== History ==
The Highland Cross began in 1983 as "the Midsummer Madathon" initiative by the Inverness branch office of the Fire Services National Benevolent Fund in the Northern Fire Brigade to raise funds for the Highland Scanner Appeal. It became an annual event in 1989 and now comprises 265 teams of three allocated by ballot. The event raises money each year for Highland causes; by 2019 the total raised was £5.3 million, and by 2025 the total raised was £6.6 million.

== Winners ==
- List of winners:
