= X99 Inverness–Thurso =

Express bus service in Scotland

X99
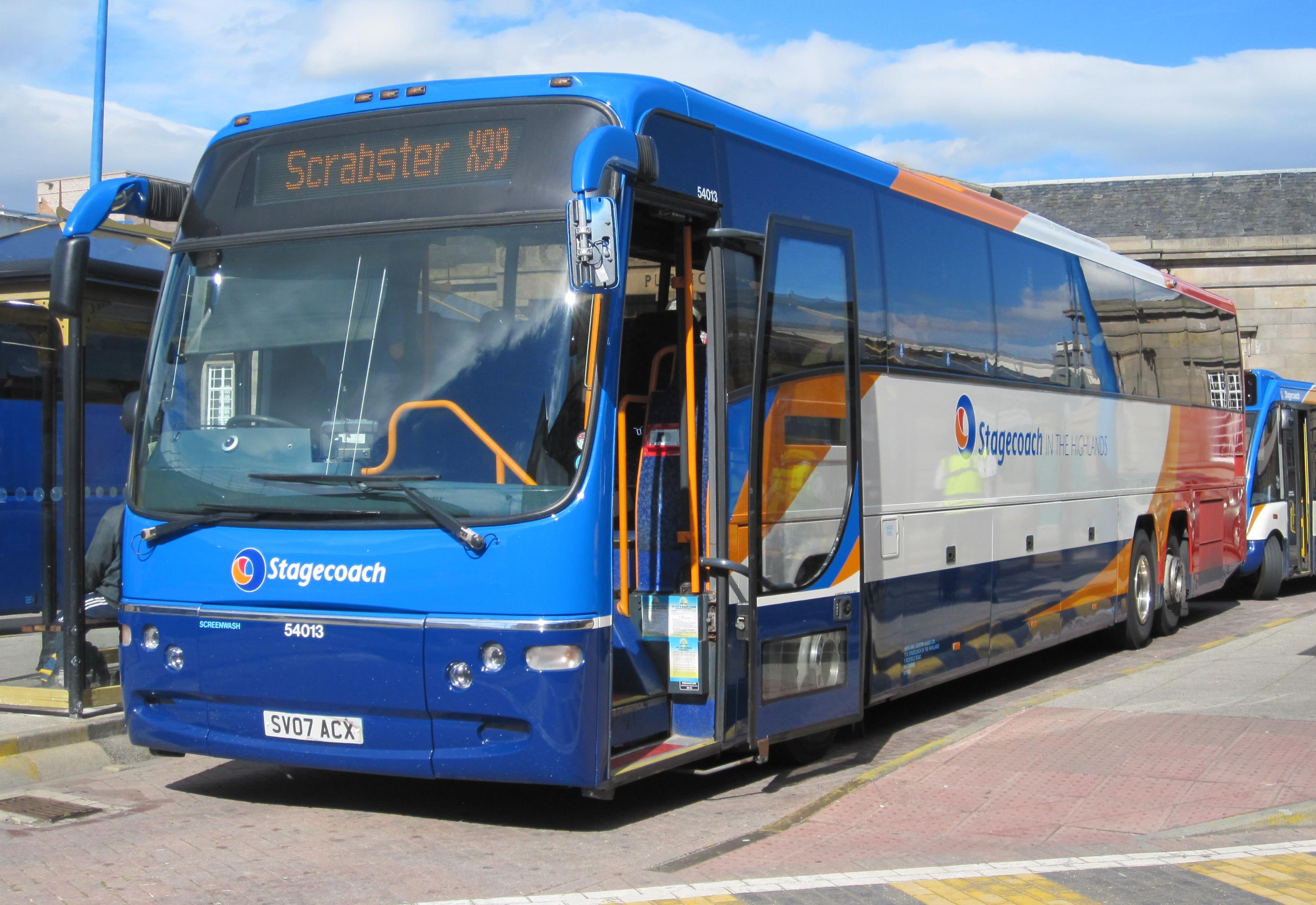

Overview
- Operator: Stagecoach Highlands
- Status: Operating

Route
- Start: Inverness Bus Station
- Via: Dornoch, Golspie, Brora, Helmsdale, Wick
- End: Thurso

Service
- Frequency: 3 buses per day (Monday - Friday); 2 buses per day (Saturday); 1 bus per day (Sunday)

The X99 was an express bus service operated by Stagecoach Highlands. It was the fastest public transport connection between Inverness and Caithness. The route ran from Inverness to Thurso via Wick, Helmsdale, Brora, Golspie, and Dornoch, with at least one service per day extending to Scrabster to meet the ferry to Stromness.

== History ==
In 2019, the timetable was revised to introduce a comfort break at Dornoch.

During the first COVID-19 lockdown in 2020, passenger numbers fell by over 80%.

The route ceased operating from 19 October 2026, with D&E Coaches acquiring Stagecoach's Thurso and Wick bus operations.

== Controversy ==
New Plaxton interdeck coaches, introduced in 2018, were criticised for alleged accessibility issues. Only three seats and space for one wheelchair user was provided at ground level, with all other passengers having to climb a set of stairs to reach their seat. The coaches were also criticised due to the toilet only being accessible via a steep staircase. In response, Stagecoach stated that the coaches met Disability Discrimination Act standards. The company stated that introducing the new coaches allowed them to increase the capacity of the service.

In 2020, the buses were replaced with Volvo B13 coaches.

== Competing services ==
In September 2019, Aaron's of Wick introduced a competing service which ran once per day. In response, Stagecoach introduced its low cost Megabus brand to Caithness, offering heavily discounted fares on the X99 service. This resulted in poor passenger figures for the new rival service which was withdrawn the following year. Stagecoach then withdrew the Megabus brand.

A competing service was operated by Ember, E6, which started operating on 9 June 2025 and has called at Raigmore Hospital since 11 November 2026.
