= Falls of Glomach =

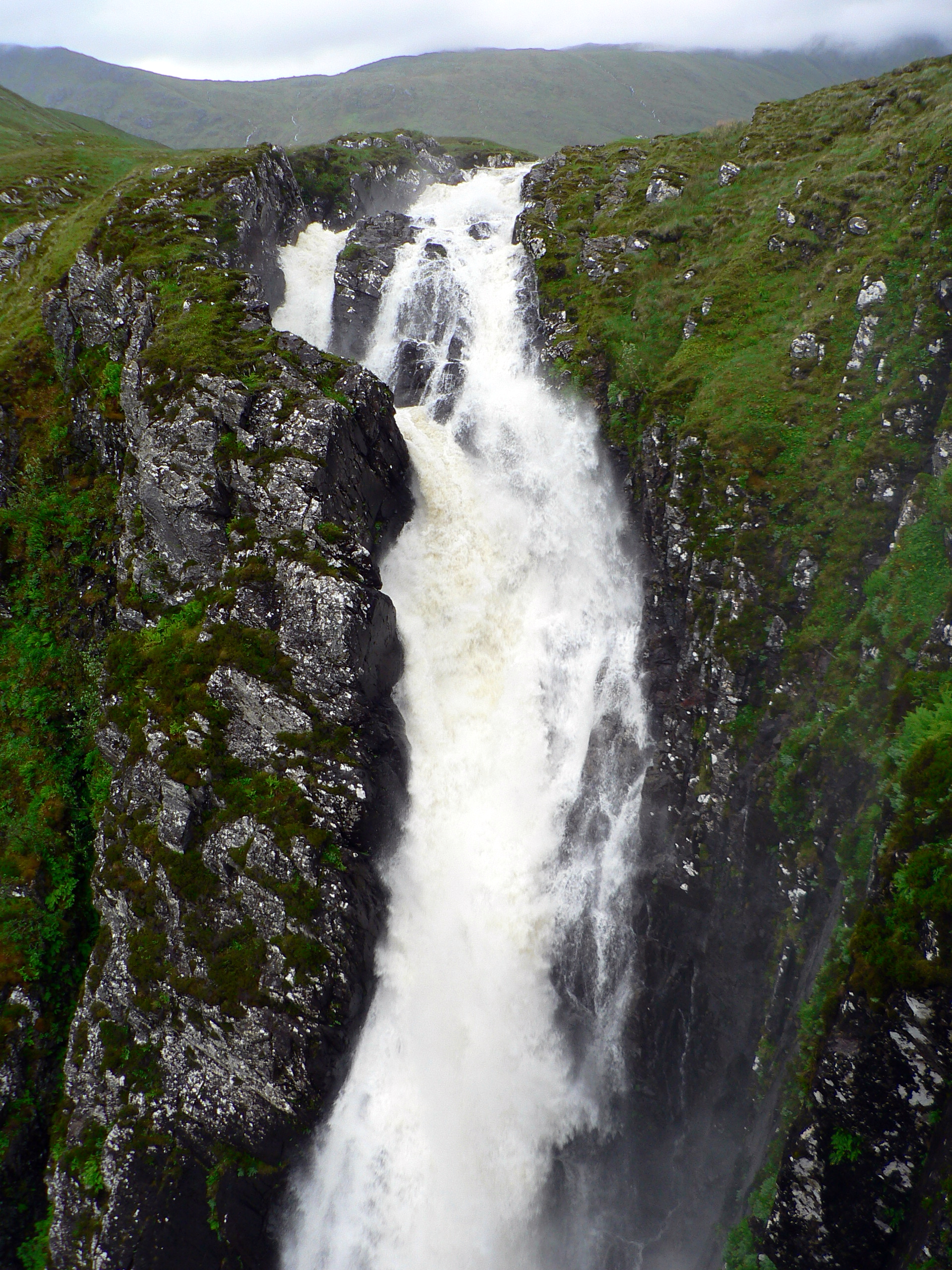
- Falls of Glomach

- Location within Scotland
- Location: Ross-shire, Scotland
- Coordinates: 57.2786°N 5.2892°W
- Total height: 113 metres (371 ft)
- Watercourse: Allt a' Ghlomaich

The Falls of Glomach, in Highland, Scotland, is one of the tallest waterfalls in Britain, with a single drop of 113 m (370 ft). The falls are located approximately 18 miles (29 km) east of Kyle of Lochalsh, in the historic county of Ross-shire. The word glòmach means "hazy" or "gloomy" in Scottish Gaelic, but can also mean "chasm". While not the highest waterfall in Scotland or the UK, it is considered one of the most spectacular.

The falls are at the northern edge of Kintail, which was donated to the National Trust for Scotland (NTS) in 1944 and subsequently incorporating West Affric in 1993. It is not easily reached on foot, requiring a 20 kilometre trek through remote and wild countryside. There are multiple walking routes into the falls, but the main one advised by NTS is from Morvich via the Bealach na Sroine (pass of the nose), a 5–6 hour round trip of 17.5 km (10.9 mi) and 790 m (2,590 ft) ascent through remote countryside with limited mobile reception.

It is difficult to photograph the whole falls in one shot because of their height and lack of a good vantage point.

The top of the falls is at an elevation of 320 m (1,050 ft) above sea level, where the Abhainn Gaorsaic plunges into a gorge. Downstream of the falls this is named the Allt a' Ghlomaich, which is a left bank tributary of the River Elchaig.

In 1973, an 11 year old girl fell 60 m (200 ft) down into the gorge. Although unhurt, it took the Kintail Mountain Rescue Team nine hours with 40 people to rescue her, which was one of the most difficult the team had to do according to the leader at the time. Rosie McCusker (née Horder) donated £5,000 to the Kintail MRT 50 years later as a thank you for the rescue.

== See also ==
- List of waterfalls
- List of waterfalls in the United Kingdom
