= Aaron's of Wick =

Aaron's of Wick was a bus company based in Wick, Scotland, owned and run by Aaron Wilson. It operates from a depot in Rutherford Street, Wick. As of December 2022, the firm employed 25 people and had 22 vehicles, owing to local school and service work contracts. The firm operated private hire coaches, school transport, and rail replacement buses. It also operated the A9 service, a competitor to the X99, that ran in 2019 and 2020. The company stopped trading in 2025, with most of their coaches having already been sold on.
