= Whaligoe =

Coordinates: 58.34719°N 3.16114°W

- Location within the Caithness area
- OS grid reference: ND321404
- Council area: Highland
- Lieutenancy area: Caithness
- Country: Scotland
- Sovereign state: United Kingdom
- Post town: LYBSTER
- Postcode district: KW2
- Dialling code: 01955
- Police: Scotland
- Fire: Scottish
- Ambulance: Scottish
- UK Parliament: Caithness, Sutherland and Easter Ross
- Scottish Parliament: Caithness, Sutherland and Ross

Whaligoe is a small port in Caithness, in the Highland area of Scotland, which was prospected by Thomas Telford in 1786 during his tour of northern fishing harbours for the British Fishing Society. His judgement of the place was that it was a "terrible spot". However, undaunted, Captain David Brodie spent £8 to cut the famous 330 steps. His confidence was rewarded in 1814 with the harbour supporting 14 herring boats.

== Whaligoe steps ==
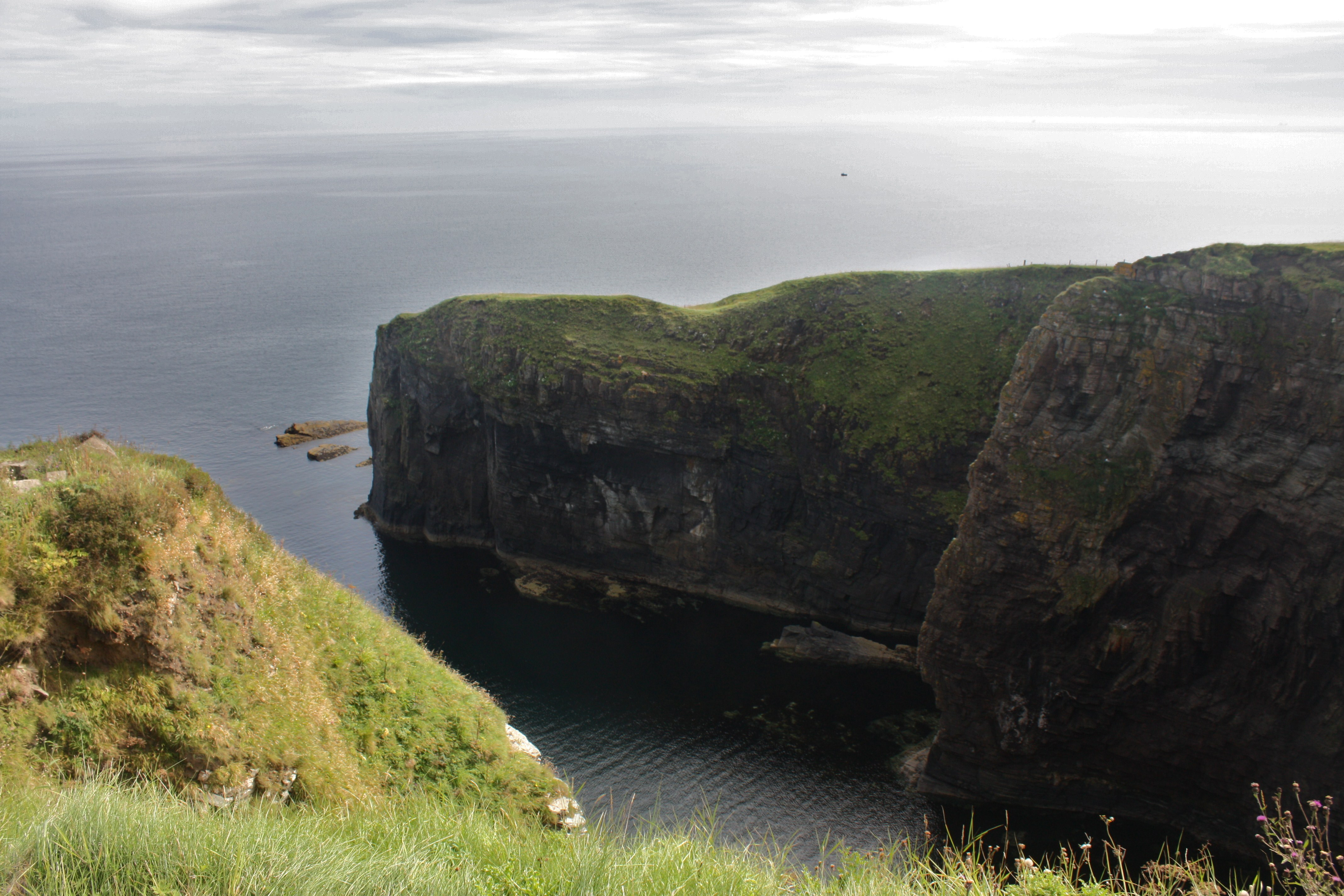
The cliffs and harbour at Whaligoe.

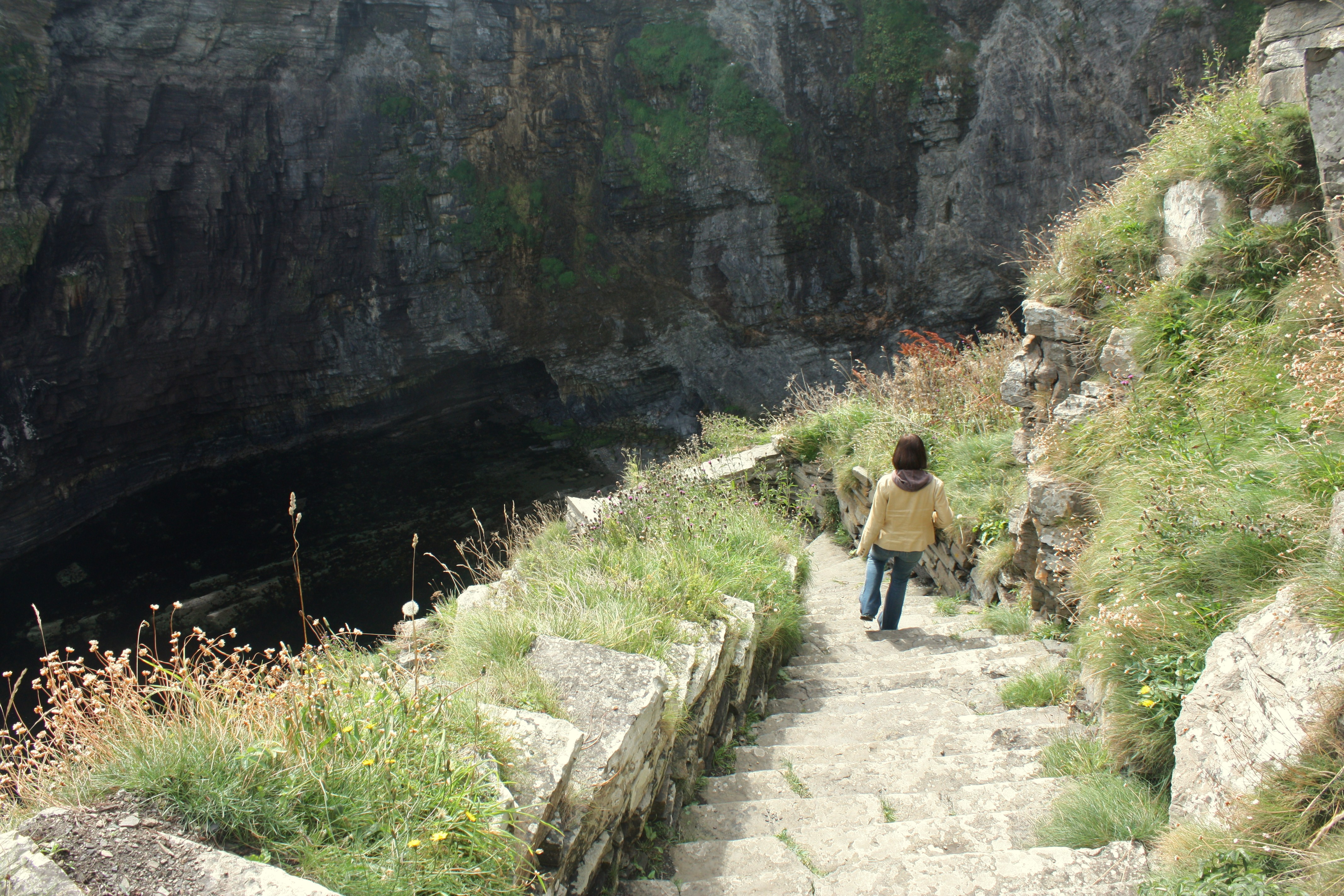
Descending the Whaligoe Steps.

The Whaligoe Steps is a man-made stairway of 365 steps that descend to what was a naturally formed harbour between two sea cliffs - once a landing place for fishing boats. The steps are located just south of the town of Wick in Caithness on mainland Scotland's most northeasterly coast. They date originally from the mid-18th century and were once used by fisherwomen to haul up the creels of herring landed at the harbour beneath. Crews of women, some in their early seventies, would gut the fish — herring, cod, haddock, or ling — and would carry them up the steps in baskets to be taken on foot to be sold in Wick, some 7 to 8 miles away. Barrels made in the cooperage at the top of the cliffs were taken down for salted herring to be stored in then taken away by schooner. Although a popular attraction today, 'Whaligoe Steps' is notoriously difficult to find as the steps are not signposted on the main road. Sea birds such as oystercatchers and terns nest in the cliffsides and circle on the wind down to the water. A sea cave provides another opportunity for exploration.

The steps were repaired early in the 19th century and again very recently. The late Etta Juhle cleared about 30 tons of rubble by herself in 1975 after a landslip and David Nicolson of Ulbster has worked continuously on the steps with local historian Iain Sutherland and many other volunteers since 1998, repairing the barking kettles, quarrying stone, manually carrying it up or down the cliffs and grass-cutting about every three weeks during the summer season. 'Whaligoe Steps' has won the Shell Best of Britain award twice. In 1808, seven boats worked Whaligoe. By 1826 their number had risen to twenty four, but thereafter declined rapidly.

The phenomena of “Whaligoe Step Leg”, is characterised by feeling a dull pain in the top and bottom of the leg, the day after ascending the Steps; this is more apparent in sedentary adults who think it’s “a good idea” to race back up the Steps after a brisk descent.

== Fishing ==
The Annual Reports of the Fishery Board for Scotland provide an insight into fishing in Whaligoe and Sarclet in the years before the First World War. The statistics do not indicate which place was more important. In the report for 1909 it was stated that cod and crabs were the principal kind of fish landed"..

Fishery Statistics

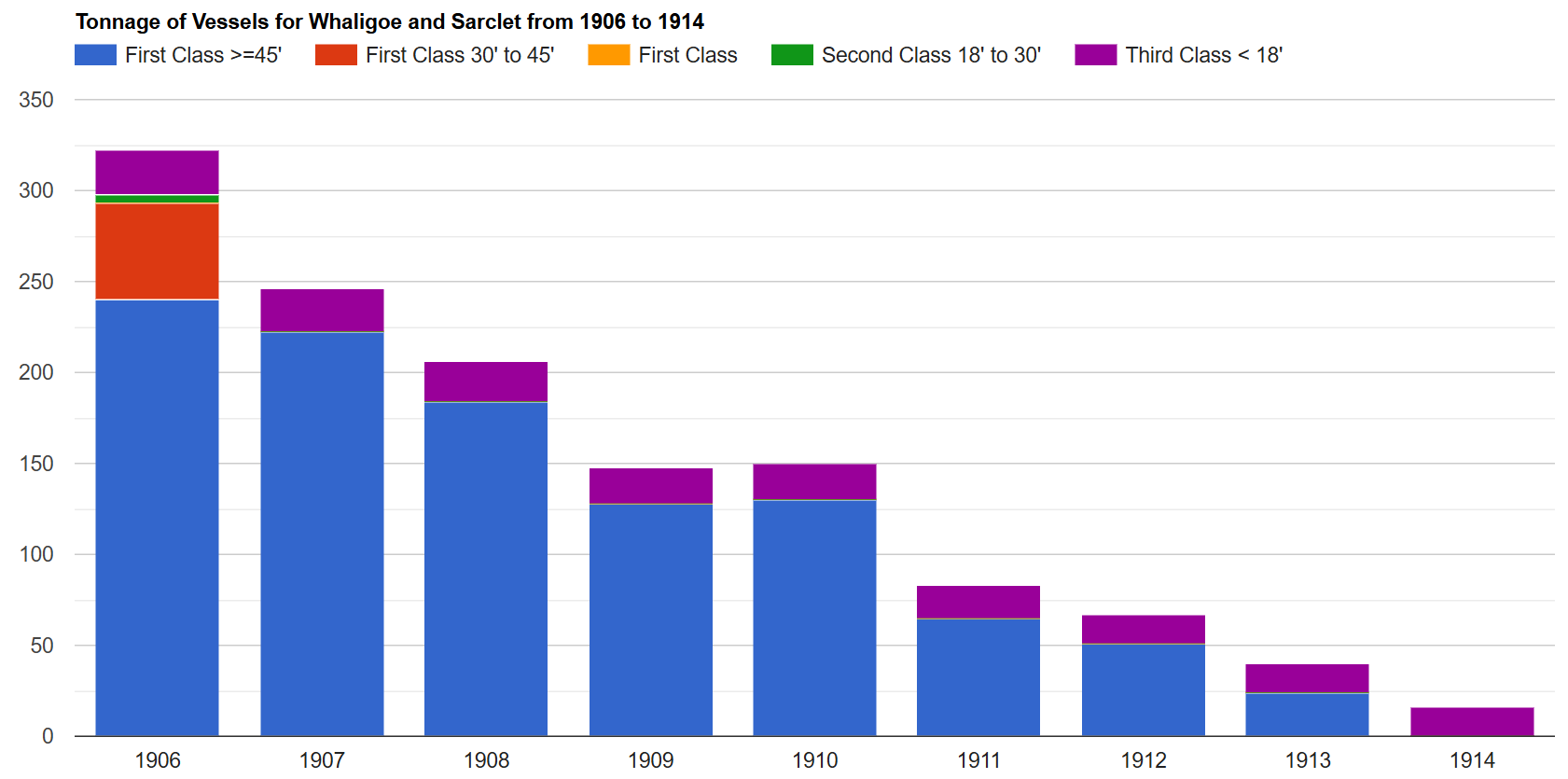
Tonnage of vessels

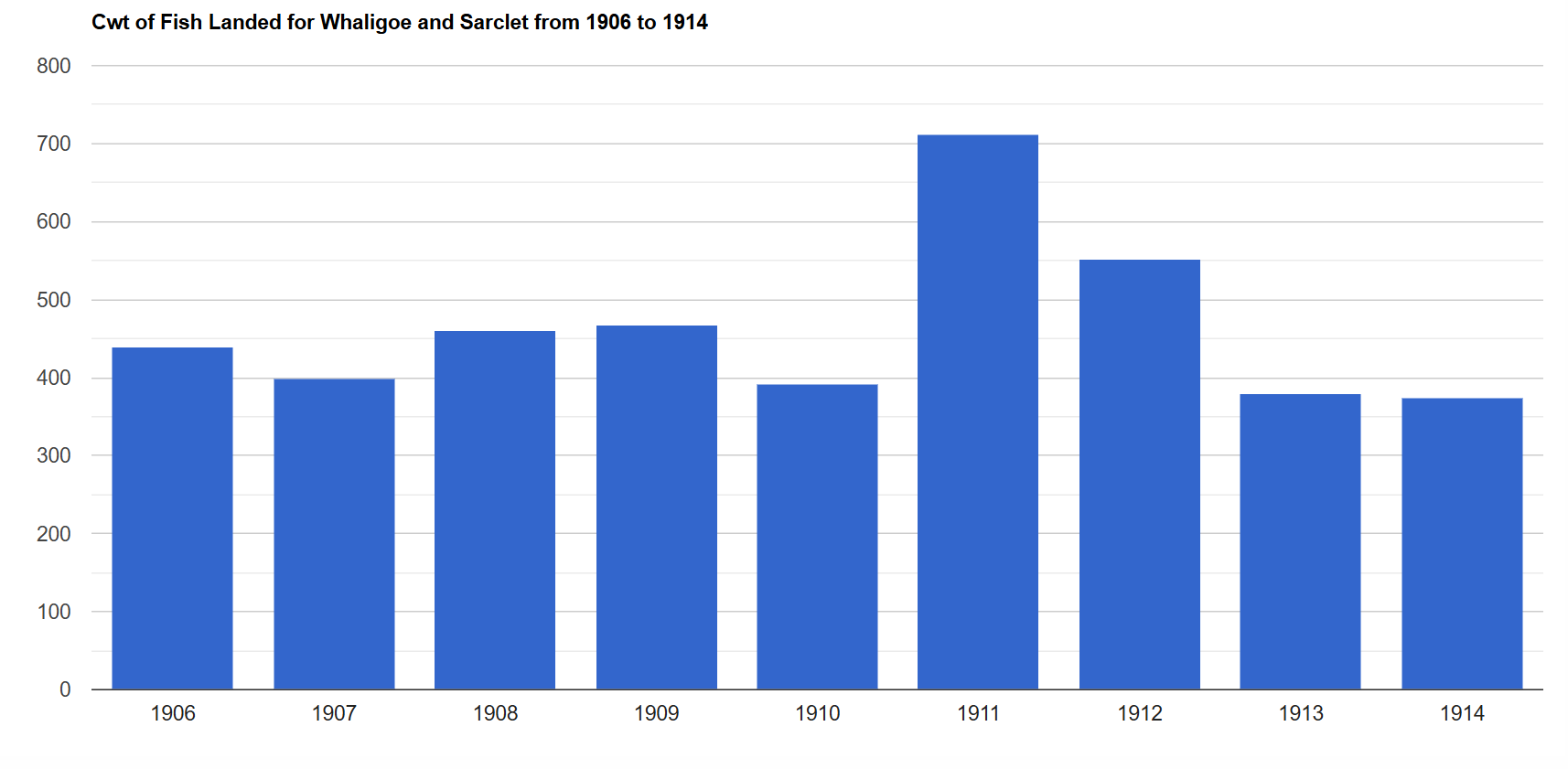
Cwt of fish landed

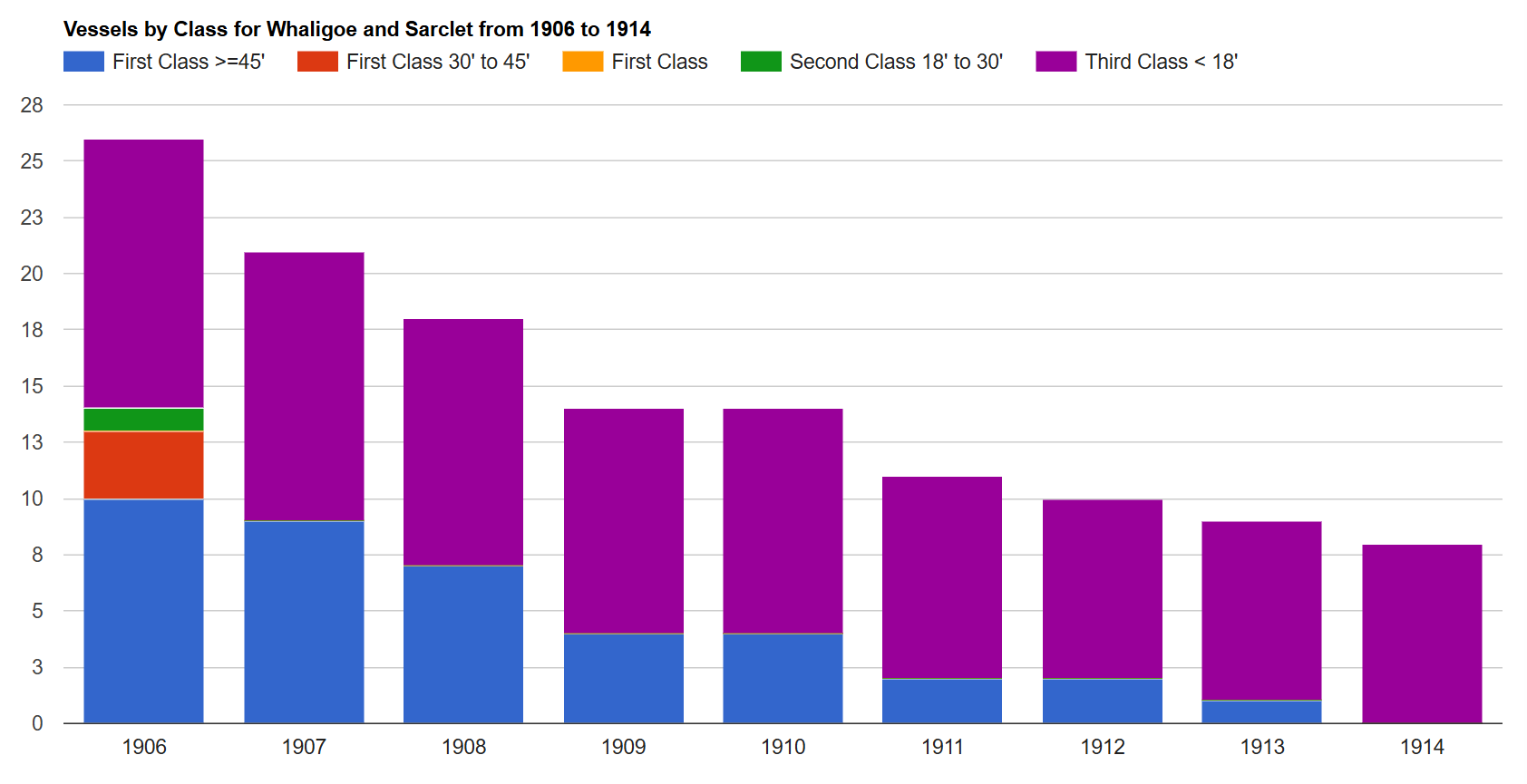
Vessels by class

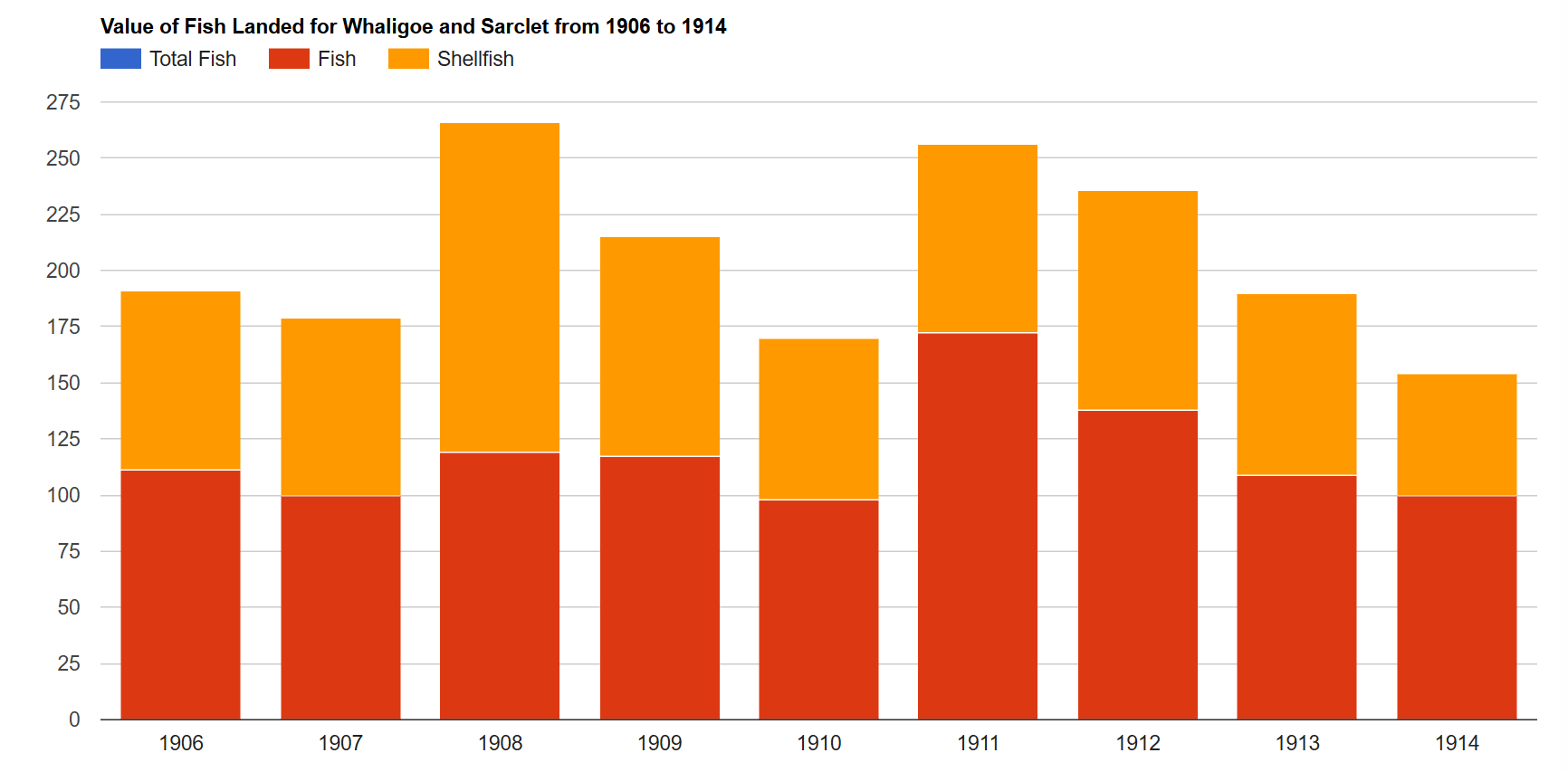
Value (£) of fish landed

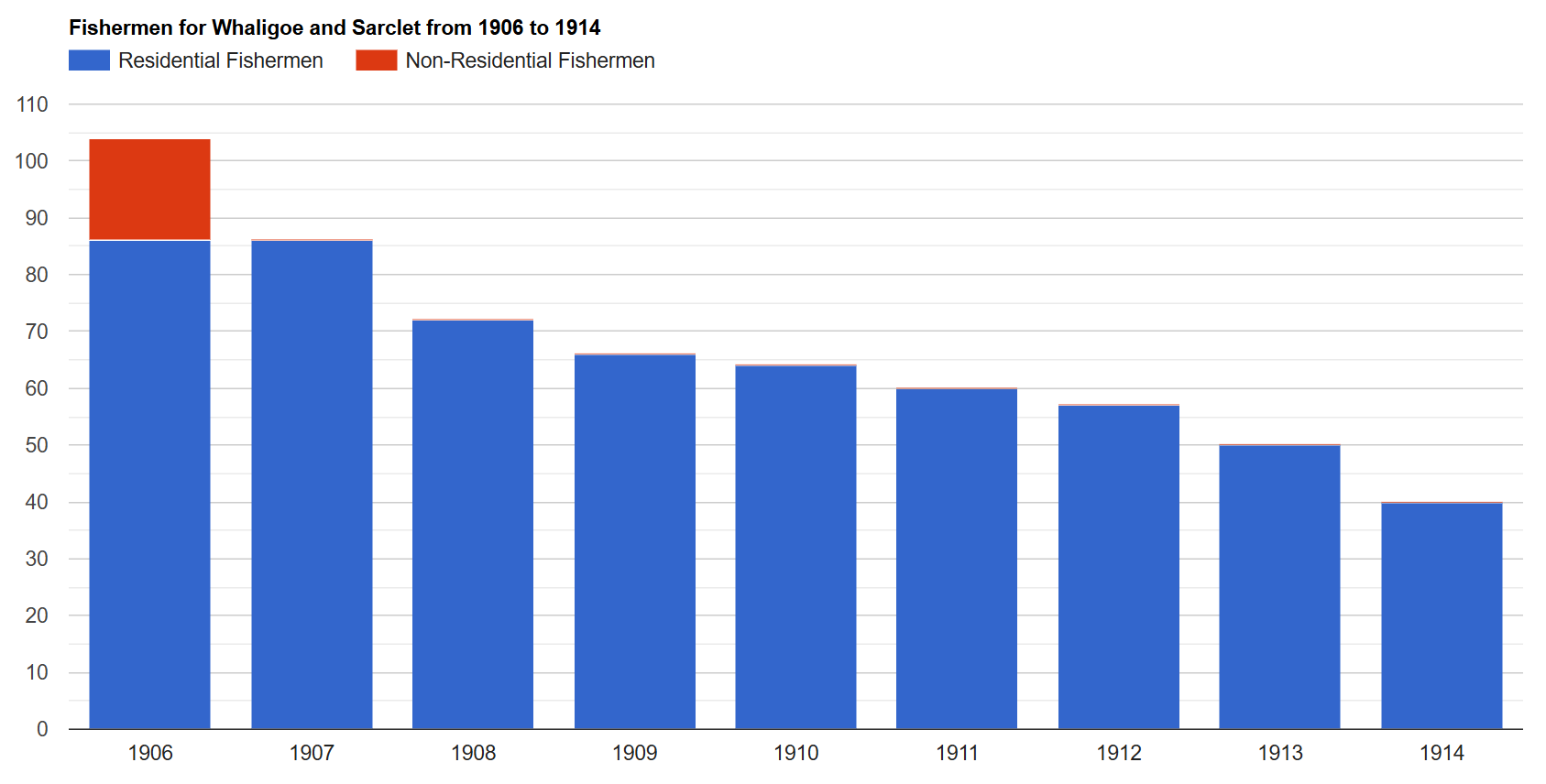
Fishermen

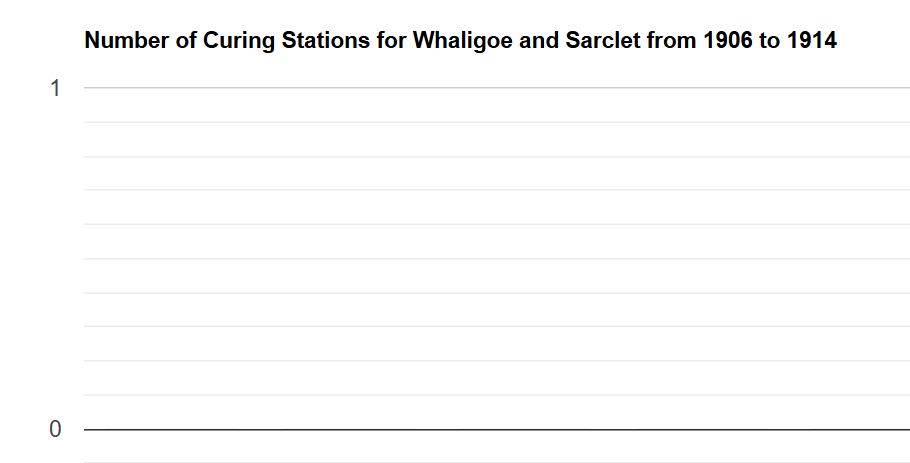
Placeholder - no curing stations
