= Duncansby Head =

Most northeasterly part of the British and Scotland mainland

Duncansby Head Lighthouse
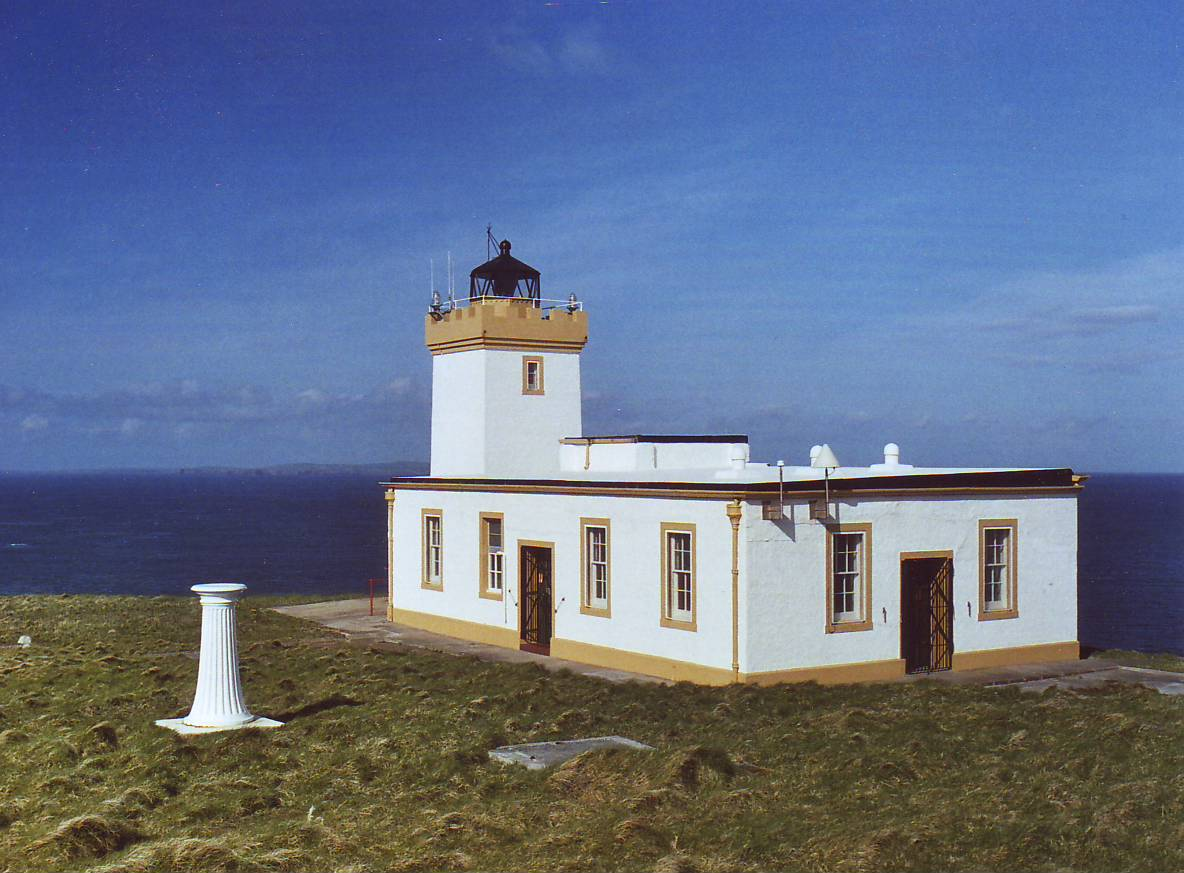
- Duncansby Head Lighthouse
- Location: Duncansby Head; Scotland; United Kingdom
- Coordinates: 58.6439°N 3.0253°W

Tower
- Constructed: 1924
- Designed by: David Alan Stevenson
- Construction: concrete tower
- Automated: 1997
- Height: 11 m (36 ft)
- Shape: square tower with balcony and lantern
- Markings: white tower, black lantern, ochre balcony
- Power source: mains electricity
- Operator: Northern Lighthouse Board
- Racon: T

Light
- Focal height: 67 m (220 ft)
- Intensity: 596,000 cd
- Range: 22 nmi (41 km)
- Characteristic: Fl W 12 s

Duncansby Head (Scottish Gaelic: Ceann Dhunngain or Dùn Gasbaith) is the most northeasterly part of both the Scottish and British mainlands, slightly northeast of John o' Groats. It lies approximately 20 km (12 mi) east-southeast of Dunnet Head, the northernmost point of both the Scottish and British mainlands. Duncansby Head is in Caithness, Highland, in north-eastern Scotland. The headland juts into the North Sea, with the Pentland Firth to its north and west and the Moray Firth to its south.

== Lighthouse ==
The point is marked by Duncansby Head Lighthouse, built by David Alan Stevenson in 1924.

A minor public road leads from John o' Groats to Duncansby Head, which makes Duncansby Head the farthest point by road from Land's End.

The Duncansby Head Site of Special Scientific Interest includes the 6.5-kilometre (4-mile) stretch of coast south to Skirza Head. It includes the Duncansby Stacks, prominent sea stacks just off the coast.

== Atomic weapon test ==
In 2016, it was reported in The Sunday Post newspaper that scientists from the Atomic Weapons Establishment in Aldemarston had proposed a nuclear weapon test on the Stacks of Duncansby in 1953, but that the prevailing wet weather was too much for contemporary electronics and the idea was shelved.

== See also ==
- List of lighthouses in Scotland
- List of Northern Lighthouse Board lighthouses
