= Sgùrr na Cìche =

Mountain in Scotland

Coordinates: 57.01270°N 5.45718°W

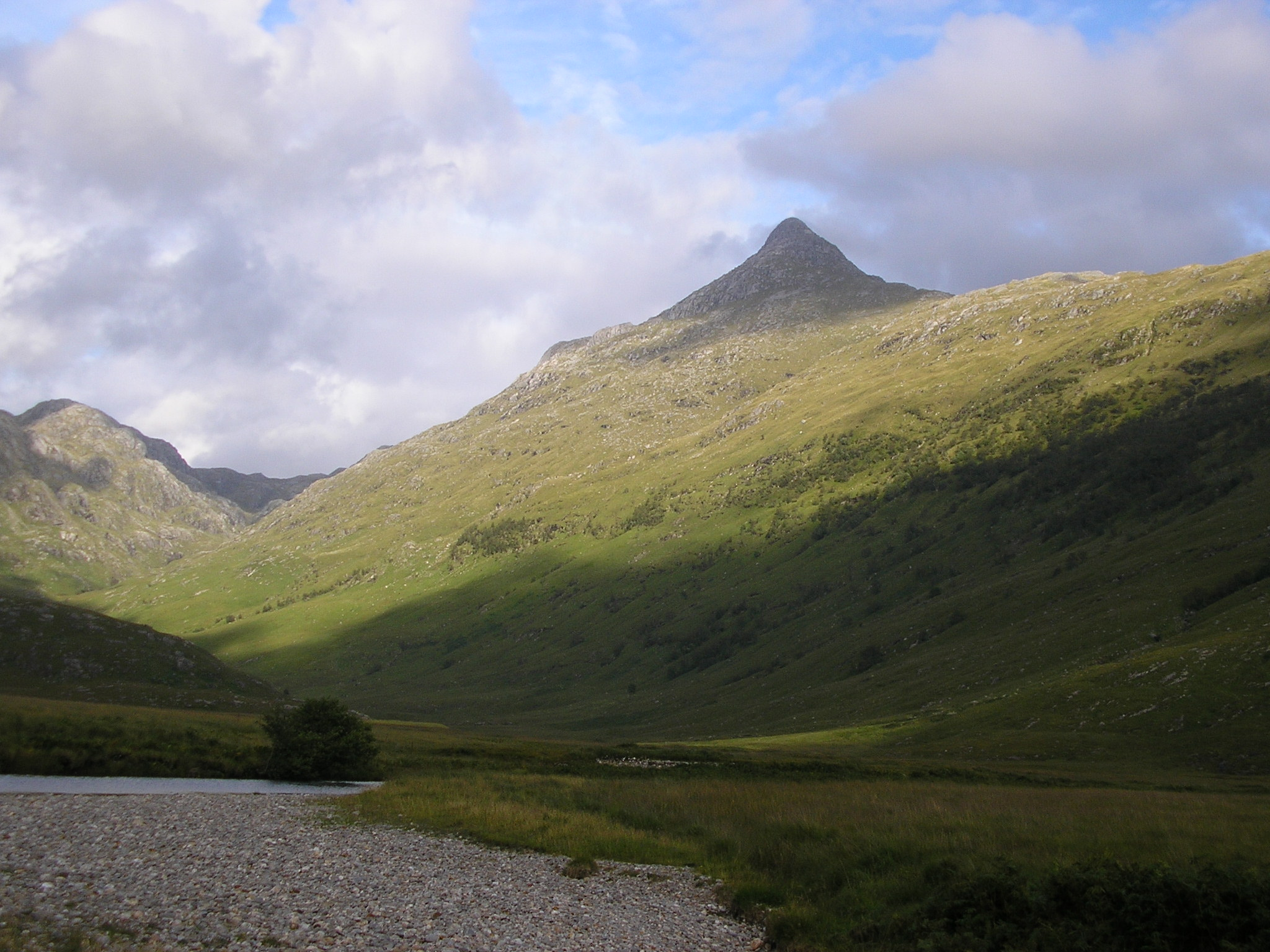
- Sgùrr na Cìche seen from the head of Loch Nevis to the west.

Highest point
- Elevation: 1,040 m (3,410 ft)
- Prominence: 839 m (2,753 ft)Ranked 25th in British Isles
- Parent peak: Carn Eige
- Listing: Marilyn, Munro

Naming
- English translation: rocky peak of the breast
- Language of name: Gaelic
- Pronunciation: Scottish Gaelic: [ˈs̪kuːrˠ nə ˈkʰʲiːçə]

Geography
- Location: Knoydart, Scotland
- Parent range: Northwest Highlands
- OS grid: NM902966
- Topo map: OS Landranger 33, 40

Sgùrr na Cìche (Scottish Gaelic for ''pap' or 'conical hilltop'') is a mountain in Knoydart, in the Northwest Highlands of Scotland. It lies on the edge of Knoydart in an area known as the Rough Bounds of Knoydart.

The peak has a distinctive conical summit, making it easily recognisable in views from many of Scotland's mountains, including Càrn Eige and Ben Nevis. Its close neighbours include Ladhar Bheinn and The Saddle, but thanks to the deep gulf separating it from them, it has a high prominence — the 25th highest in Britain.

Sgùrr na Cìche may be climbed from the head of Loch Nevis on the southern side of Knoydart by following the ridge of Druim a' Ghoirtein. However, due to the remoteness of the Knoydart peninsula, it is more commonly climbed as part of a circuit from the head of Glen Dessarry, via a route that also takes in the neighbouring Munros of Garbh Chioch Mhòr and Sgùrr nan Coireachan.

It is also the wettest place in the United Kingdom, with a yearly rainfall average of 5,000 millimetres (200 in).
