= Sgùrr nan Eugallt =

Mountain in Scotland

Coordinates: 57.08822°N 5.42458°W

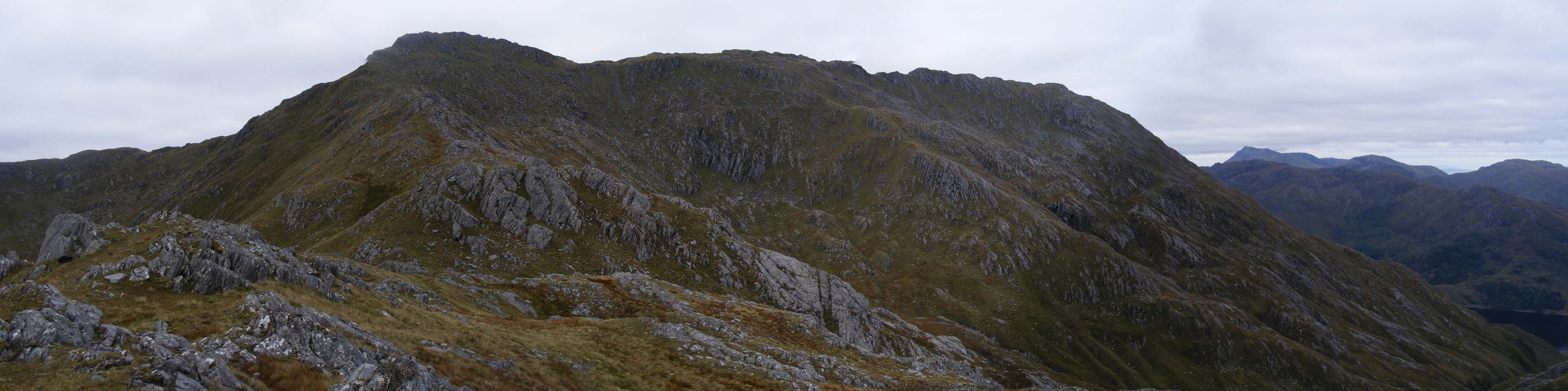
- The summit ridge of Sgùrr nan Eugallt, seen from the ridge above the top of the stalkers' path to the northeast

Highest point
- Elevation: 898 m (2,946 ft)
- Prominence: 623 m (2,044 ft)Ranked 100th in British Isles
- Parent peak: Ladhar Bheinn
- Listing: Corbett, Marilyn

Naming
- English translation: Peak of the death streams
- Language of name: Scottish Gaelic

Geography
- Location: Loch Hourn, Highland, Scotland
- Parent range: Northwest Highlands
- OS grid: NG926049
- Topo map: OS Landranger 33

Sgùrr nan Eugallt is the highest of a well defined group of mountains that lie south of Loch Hourn, stretching from Barrisdale to Loch Quoich. Although its summit is lower than many nearby neighbours, it is cut off from all its higher neighbours by a ring of deep glens. Despite being in a very wild and remote area, it can be easily ascended from a ruined roadside cottage 4 km to the east of its summit, where there is limited parking space. But the road is single track and the cottage is 20 miles from the nearest main road. Due to its isolation and insufficient height to qualify for Munro's Tables, Sgùrr nan Eugallt is infrequently climbed.

== Ascents ==
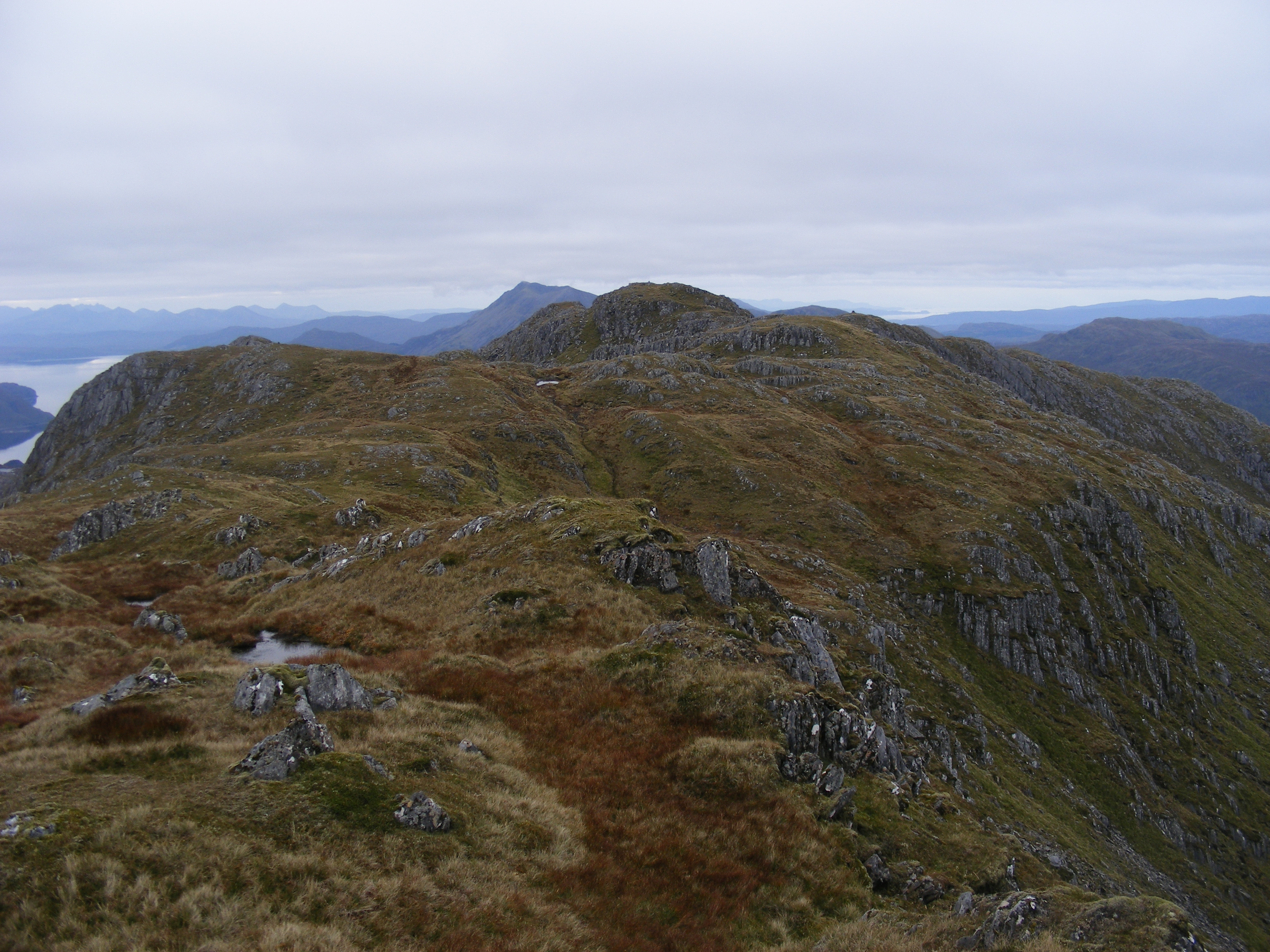
Looking north west from the triangulation point to the highest point. Beinn Sgritheall, 13 km, 974 m can be seen level with and just to the left of the highest point.

An old stalkers' path from the ruined cottage should guide the climber to a point just below a ridge at about 650 metres. The path was well built in its time but some sections have become wet and slippery. On gaining the ridge, turn left and follow the ridge to the 894 m triangulation point. The ridge becomes steep near the top but the steepest section can be bypassed. Contrary to the implication of the 1:50,000 Landranger map, several websites and the 1990 edition of the Scottish Mountaineering Club publication The Corbetts and other Scottish Hills, the true summit lies about 600 metres to the north west of the triangulation point. List tickers should therefore turn right along the main ridge of the range and continue for about 600 metres to the main summit, which is not shown on any map. About 300 m further along the ridge is an 881 m summit, which is shown on topographic maps.
