= Kinloch Hourn =

Small settlement in the West Highlands of Scotland

Coordinates: 57.106°N 5.387°W

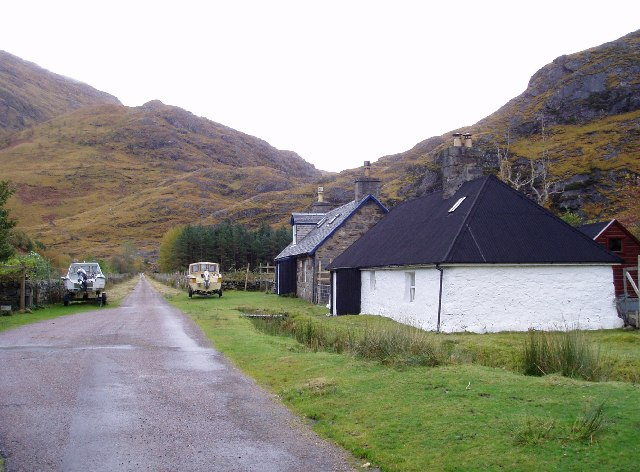
Farmhouse in Kinloch Hourn

Kinloch Hourn is a small settlement at the end of Loch Hourn, in the West Highlands of Scotland. The name comes from the Gaelic, Ceann Loch Shubhairne, for "the head of Loch Hourn". Kinloch Hourn is at the end of 35 km (22 miles) of single-track road, which runs west from a junction with the A87 beside Loch Garry.

From Kinloch Hourn, a path continues along the south side of the loch to Barrisdale. The path then climbs over Màm Barrisdale, before dropping down to the village of Inverie in Knoydart. This route once had a number of townships along it, and may have been used as a coffin road. This is also used as a walking route into the mountains of Knoydart, including Ladhar Bheinn and Luinne Bheinn.

To the north of Loch Hourn is the route of an old drove road, which ran between Kinloch Hourn to Glenelg. Cattle from Skye were driven across Kyle Rhea to Glenelg, along this route to Kinloch Hourn, then onwards down Glen Garry.
