= Sgùrr na Sgine =

Coordinates: 57.1472°N 5.3963°W

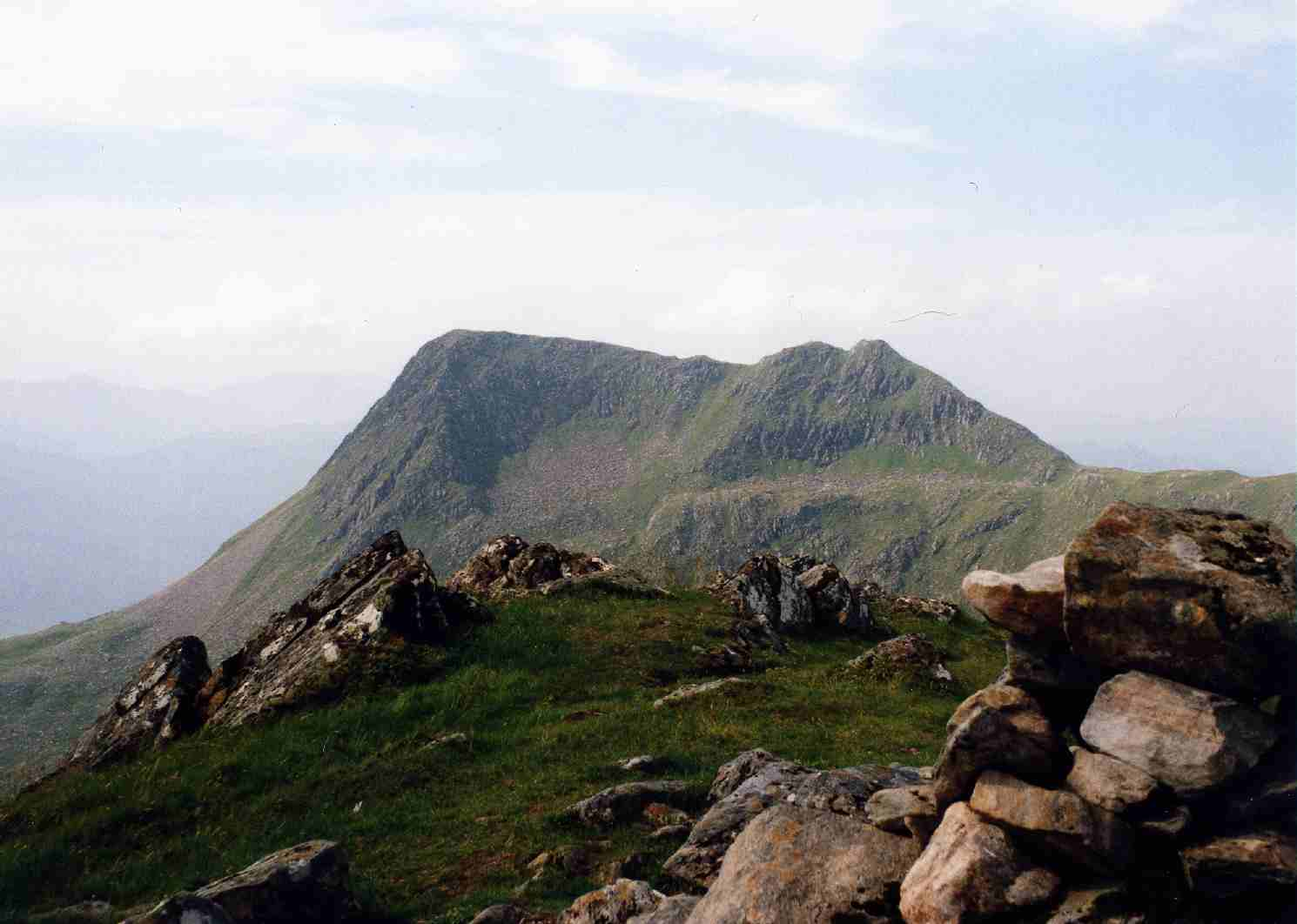
- Sgùrr na Sgine seen from the outlying top of Faochag

Highest point
- Elevation: 946 m (3,104 ft)
- Prominence: 247 m (810 ft)
- Parent peak: The Saddle
- Listing: Munro, Marilyn

Naming
- English translation: Peak of the Knife
- Language of name: Gaelic
- Pronunciation: Scottish Gaelic: [ˈs̪kuːrˠ nə ˈs̪kʲinə]

Geography
- Location: Glen Shiel, Scotland
- Parent range: Northwest Highlands
- OS grid: NG944113
- Topo map: OS Landranger 33, OS Explorer 414

Listed summits of Sgùrr na Sgine
Name	Grid ref	Height	Status
North West Top	NG943115	942 m (3090 ft)	Munro top

Sgùrr na Sgine (Scottish Gaelic for 'knife peak') is a mountain in the Northwest Highlands of Scotland. Its height is 946 metres (3,104 ft), making it a Munro. It lies eight kilometres south of Shiel Bridge in the Glenshiel Forest, between Glen Shiel and Loch Hourn.

== Overview ==
Sgùrr na Sgine is a Munro and Marilyn with a height of 946 metres (3104 feet). Though a fine mountain in its own right, it is overshadowed by its near neighbour The Saddle, regarded as one of the finest mountains in Scotland. Sgùrr na Sgine is not well seen from the A87 road to the north east. The best view from valley level is from the remote country to the south west. It looks particularly fine from the top of the Mam Barrisdale pass from where it takes on a more dramatic appearance than The Saddle. The mountain's name translates from the Gaelic as "Peak of the Knife". This is thought to refer to a wall of rock beneath the summit on its eastern flank which takes on a blade like appearance from some angles.

== Geography ==
Sgùrr na Sgine has a subsidiary Top along its north eastern ridge called Faochag (The Whelk) which reaches a height of 909 metres. The peak, which is seen as a sharp distinctive cone, alongside The Saddle when viewed from the A87 road at the Battle of Glen Shiel site (grid reference NG988135) in what is regarded as a classic mountain view. Faochog was for many years classified as a “Top” in Munro's Tables before being deleted in 1974 when remapping showed it to have insufficient height. It is now a Corbett Top with 62 metres prominence.

Sgùrr na Sgine's steep, narrow north ridge has been christened “Concorde Ridge” by famed Scottish hill walker Hamish Brown after he and a companion were startled by a vast flock of terrified ptarmigan when descending in winter conditions. The cliffs to the east of the summit are more precipitous than shown on the map and a direct descent should not be attempted to the Bealach a Toiteil. Walkers should contour round the side of the cliffs to reach the bealach which connects the mountain to the Corbett Sgùrr a'Bhac Chaolais.

== Ascents and summit ==
Sgùrr na Sgine is usually climbed with The Saddle to which it is joined by a col, the Bealach Coire Mhalagain, at 699 metres. The mountain can be climbed as an extension of the South Cluanie ridge, a line of seven Munros south of the Glen Shiel road, but this makes for a long, hard day in the hills. A direct ascent of Sgùrr na Sgine is possible from Achnangart Farm (grid reference NG962149) in Glen Shiel, almost at sea level, giving a hard climb up the grassy slopes of the north east ridge to Faochag. From there the gradient eases considerably giving an easier walk to the summit plateau, though with a rocky scramble up Concorde Ridge. A circuit of Coire Toteil can be completed by continuing from the summit to take in the Corbett Sgùrr a'Bhac Chaolais before descending to Glen Shiel.

The top of the mountain has two high points. The North West Top has a height of 942 metres and is a Munro Top. The Munro is a further 300 metres south east and 4 metres higher. From the summit there is an excellent prospect northwards to the Forcan Ridge on The Saddle. The Kintail Forest Munros are seen to the north east and the remote area of Knoydart is seen to the south west.
