= Druim Fada (Loch Hourn) =

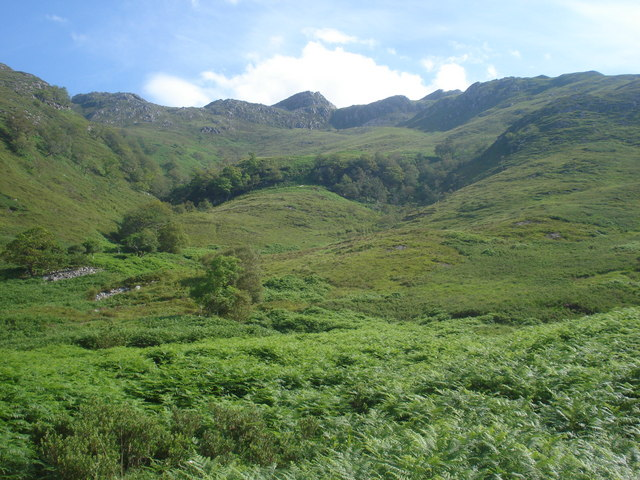
- Druim Fada from the shore of Loch Hourn

Highest point
- Elevation: 711 m (2,333 ft)
- Prominence: 484 m (1,588 ft)
- Listing: Graham, Marilyn
- Coordinates: 57°07′04″N 5°28′45″W

Geography
- Location: Ross and Cromarty, Scotland
- Parent range: Northwest Highlands
- OS grid: NG894083
- Topo map: OS Landranger 33

Druim Fada (711 m) is a mountain in the Northwest Highlands of Scotland. Located on the northern shore of Loch Hourn in Ross and Cromarty.

A long, craggy ridge, it runs for several kilometres on the northern side of the loch. The nearest village is Arnisdale to the west.

The nearest village to Druim Fada is Arnisdale, located to the west. Access to the mountain can typically be gained from Corran to the west and Kinlochhourn to the east. The summit can be identified by a rock located approximately 5 meters west-northwest of the cairn, with several walking routes available for those wishing to ascend.
