= Beinn na Caillich (Knoydart) =

Mountain in Knoydart, Scotland

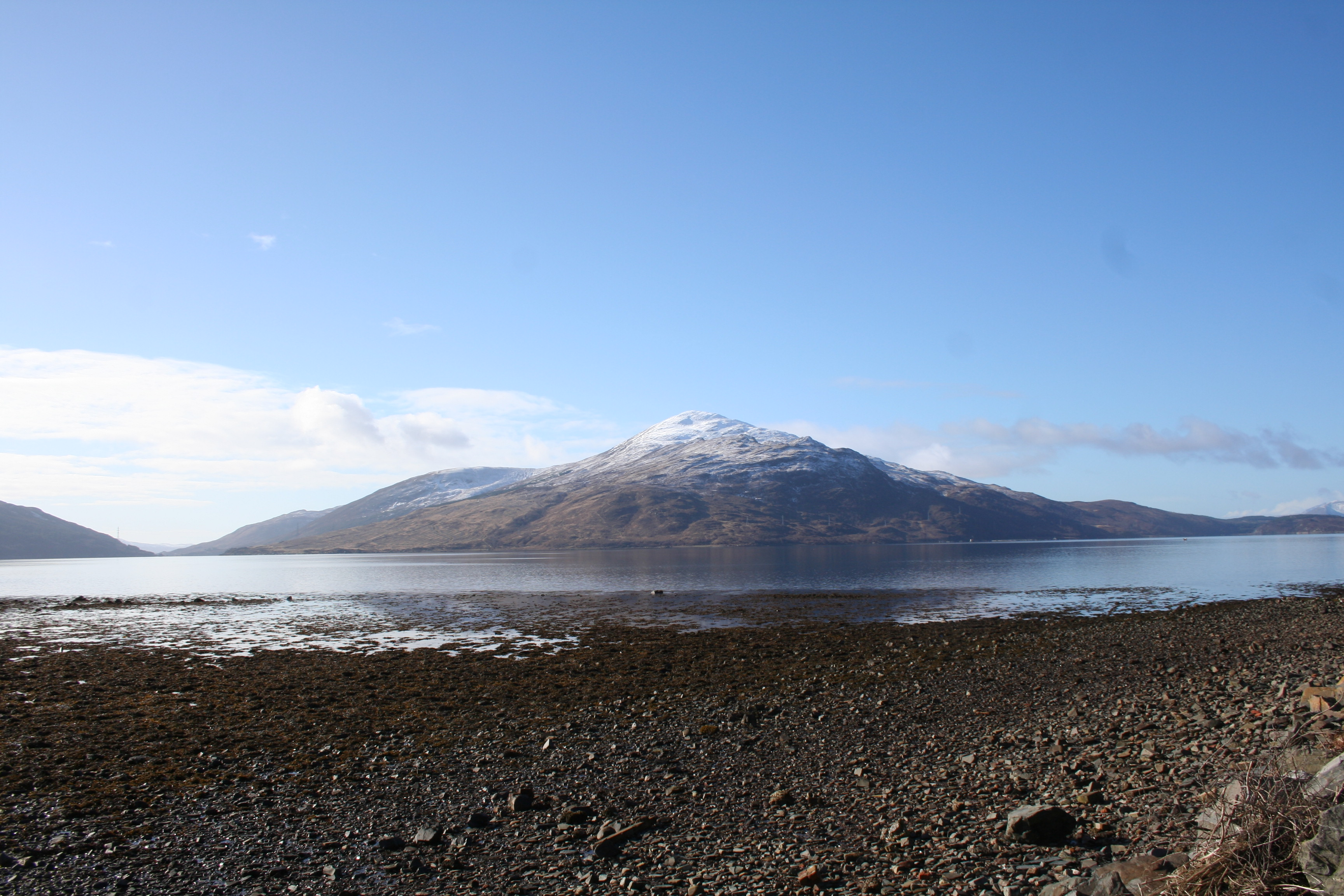
- View across Loch Hourn to Beinn na Caillich

Highest point
- Elevation: 785 m (2,575 ft)
- Prominence: 316 m (1,037 ft)
- Listing: Marilyn, Corbett
- Coordinates: 57°05′56″N 5°38′22″W

Naming
- English translation: mountain of the old woman
- Language of name: Gaelic

Geography
- Location within Scotland
- Location: Scotland
- Parent range: Northwest Highlands
- OS grid: NG796067
- Topo map: OS Landranger 33, Explorer 413

Beinn na Caillich (Scottish Gaelic for 'mountain of the old woman or Cailleach') is a mountain with a height of 732 metres (2,402 ft) in Knoydart, in the Northwest Highlands of Scotland. It is on the southern shore of Loch Hourn, north-west of the Munro of Ladhar Bheinn.
