= Beinn Sgritheall =

Highest mountain in the Glenelg area of the Highlands of Scotland

Coordinates: 57.15311°N 5.57945°W

- Beinn an Sgrithill
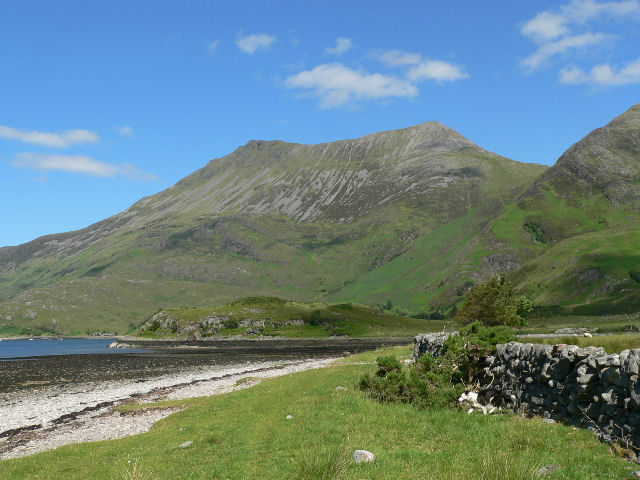
- Beinn Sgritheall seen from Corran

Highest point
- Elevation: 974 m (3,196 ft)
- Prominence: 500 m (1,600 ft)
- Parent peak: Sgurr a' Mhaoraich
- Listing: Munro, Marilyn

Naming
- English translation: scree mountain
- Language of name: Gaelic
- Pronunciation: Scottish Gaelic: [peɲ ˈs̪kɾʲihəl̪ˠ] English approximation: bayn SKREE-həl

Geography
- Location: Glenelg, Scotland
- Parent range: Northwest Highlands
- OS grid: NG836126
- Topo map: OS Landranger 33

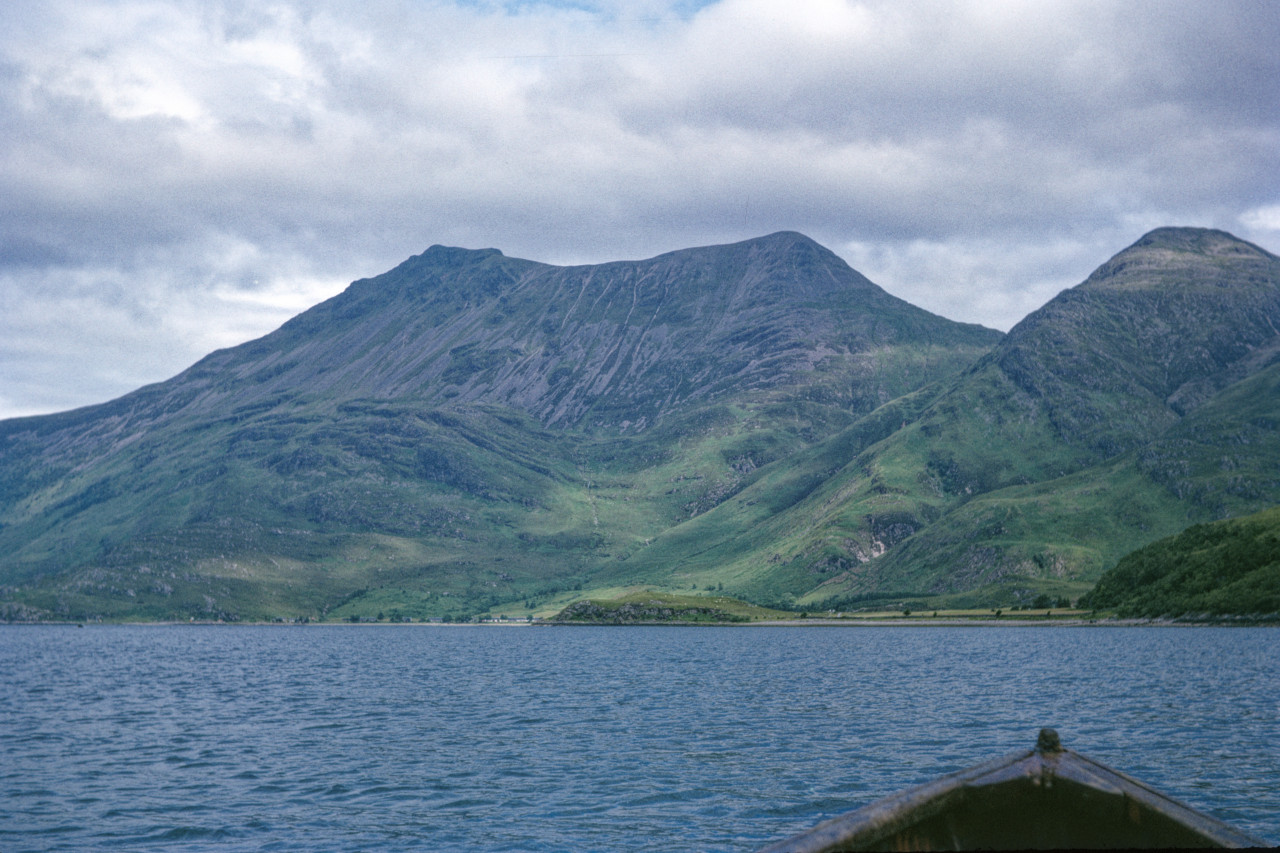
Beinn Sgritheall seen from a boat on Loch Hourn

Beinn Sgritheall or Beinn an Sgrithill (Scottish Gaelic for 'scree mountain'), also anglicized Ben Sgriol, is the highest mountain on the Glenelg peninsula in the Northwest Highlands of Scotland. It is a Munro with a height of 974 metres (3,196 ft). The main approach is via Arnisdale on the shores of Loch Hourn or via Gleann Beag to the north, with its well-known brochs. The view from the summit was described by Sir Hugh Munro, a founder member of the Scottish Mountaineering Club, as "perhaps the most beautiful I have seen in Scotland".

== Classification ==
Mountains in the British Isles are classified according to height. At 3,196 feet (974 m) Beinn Sgritheall is a Munro, being a Scottish mountain over 3,000 feet (914 m). It is also classified as a Marilyn given its prominence of 500 metres (1,640 ft). It is the highest mountain on the Glenelg peninsula, an area of largely uninhabited land bounded by Loch Alsh and Loch Duich to the north and by Loch Hourn to the west and south.

== Geography and geology ==
Beinn Sgritheall consists of a narrow, curved crest running parallel to the north shore of Loch Hourn from which several ridges extend. The south face of the mountain rises nearly 1,000 metres (3,300 ft), from the level of Loch Hourn to its summit, in 1.6 kilometres (0.99 mi). It has three tops: the summit (974 metres (3,196 ft)), a Middle Top (also 974 metres) and an East Top (906 metres (2,972 ft)). The upper parts of its west face consist of crags and scree. The north and eastern part of the mountain contain a number of remote corries. Two ridges run north-east from the summit with one curving north-west to enclose a high corrie. A third ridge runs west to Creag an Taghain, a crag above the forest of Coille Mhialairigh.

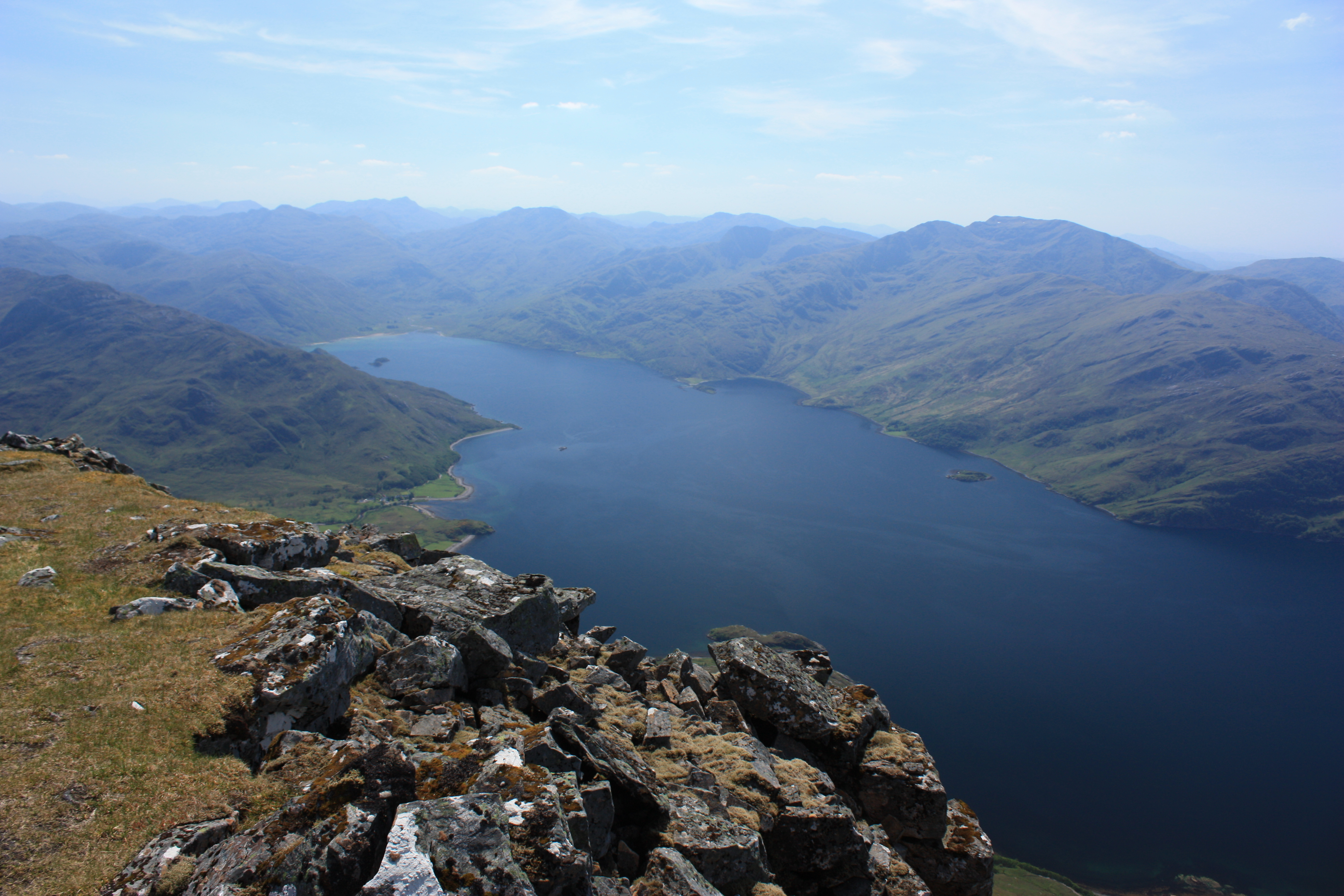
The view south east from the summit of Beinn Sgritheall with Loch Hourn and the mountains of Knoydart visible.

The view from the summit encompasses: the isles of Jura, Rùm and Mull; the mountains of Knoydart, Skye and Moidart; Ben Nevis and Slioch; and the ridges of Glen Affric and Glen Shiel. It is possible to see more than 100 named peaks from the summit and Hamish Brown would not swap the view from it "for any mountain view in the world".

The rock of Beinn Sgritheall is of the schistose type.

== Climbing ==
Beinn Sgritheall is commonly climbed from the village of Arnisdale on the shores of Loch Hourn. An alternative is to approach via Gleann Beag to the north, with its well-known brochs. Both starting points can only be accessed either overland via a single lane road from Glen Shiel, or across the waters of Loch Hourn using a ferry or boat.

It is possible to complete a number of traverses. One example approaches from the south-west side of the mountain, gaining the west ridge via the forest of Coille Mhialairigh. The summit is reached and the traverse then continues along the south-east ridge which leads to the Bealach Arnasdail pass from where it is possible to descend to Arnisdale village beside the loch approximately 3 kilometres (2 mi) from the start point.
