= Ben Aden =

Mountain in Scotland

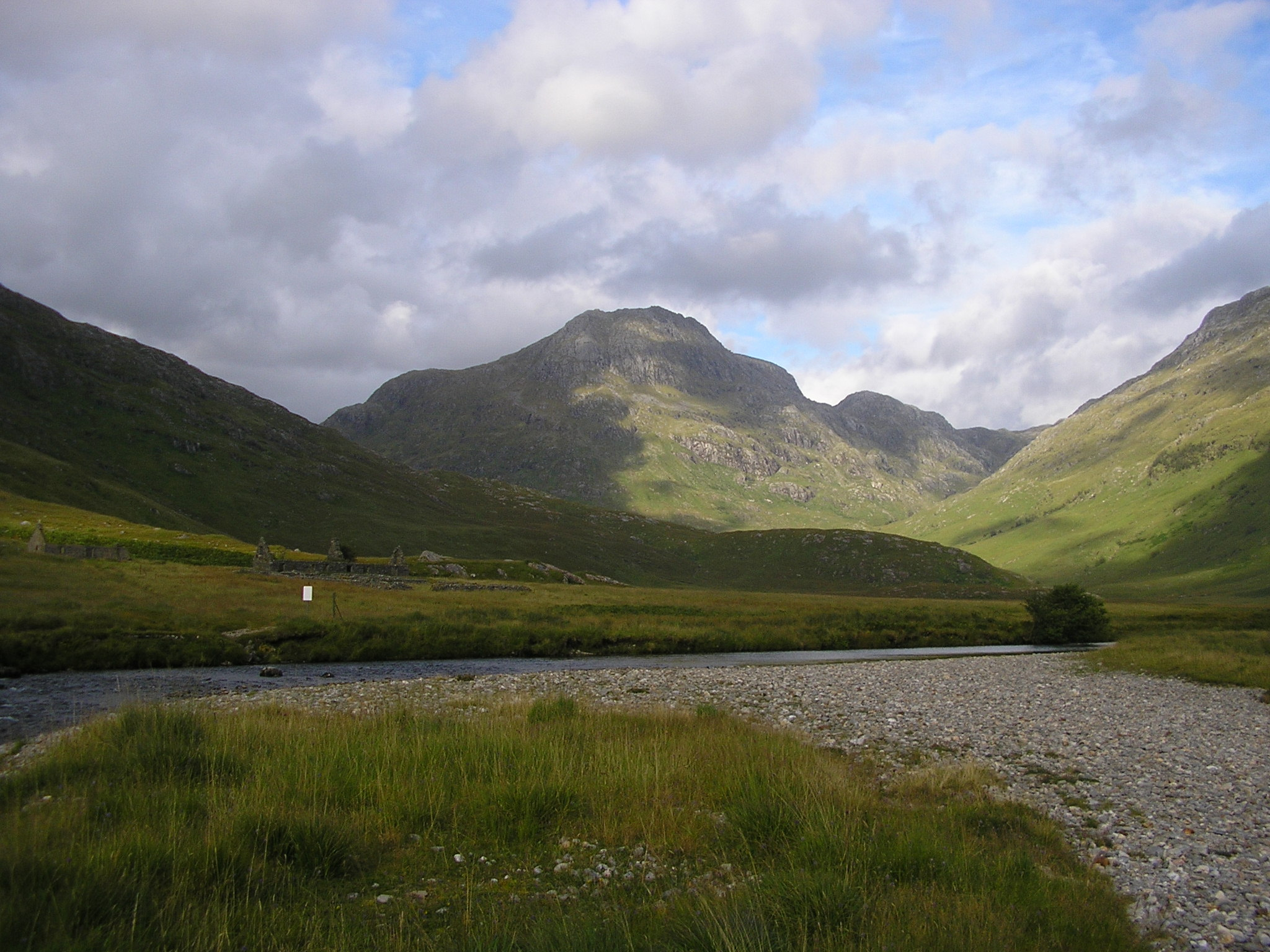
- Ben Aden

Highest point
- Elevation: 887 m (2,910 ft)
- Prominence: 251 m (823 ft)
- Listing: Corbett, Marilyn
- Coordinates: 57°01′51″N 5°27′49″W

Geography
- Location: Lochaber, Scotland
- Parent range: Northwest Highlands
- OS grid: NM899986
- Topo map: OS Landranger 33, 40

Ben Aden (887m) is a mountain in the Northwest Highlands of Scotland. It lies on the Knoydart peninsula in Lochaber.

Regarded as one of the finest Corbetts in Scotland and one of the toughest to climb, the mountain is steep and rocky on all sides. The nearest village is Inverie.
