= Garbh Chioch Mhòr =

Mountain in the Northwest Highlands of Scotland

Coordinates: 57.009°N 5.4423°W

Garbh Chioch Mhor
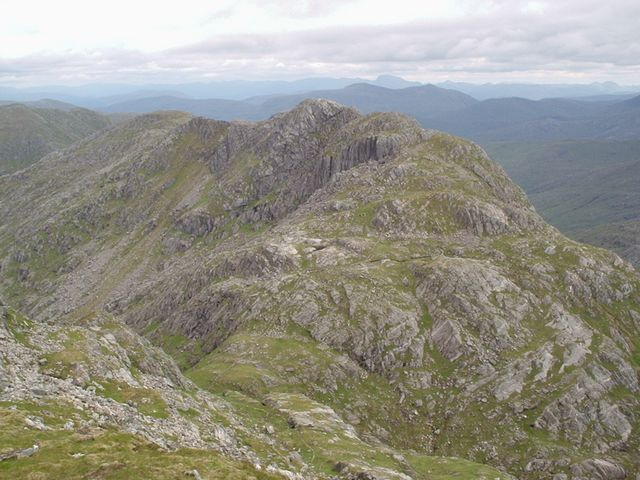
- Garbh Chioch Mhor from the neighbouring Sgurr na Ciche

Highest point
- Elevation: 1,013 m (3,323 ft)
- Prominence: 168 m (551 ft)
- Listing: Munro, Marilyn

Geography
- Location: Lochaber, Scotland
- Parent range: Northwest Highlands
- OS grid: NM910961
- Topo map: OS Landranger 33, 40

Garbh Chioch Mhor (1013 m) is a mountain in the Northwest Highlands of Scotland. It lies in the Lochaber region, between Loch Nevis and Loch Quoich.

A very rocky and remote mountain, it is usually climbed in conjunction with its higher neighbour Sgurr na Ciche. Walks usually start from Loch Arkaig several miles to the east.
