= Sgùrr a' Mhaoraich =

Mountain in Scotland

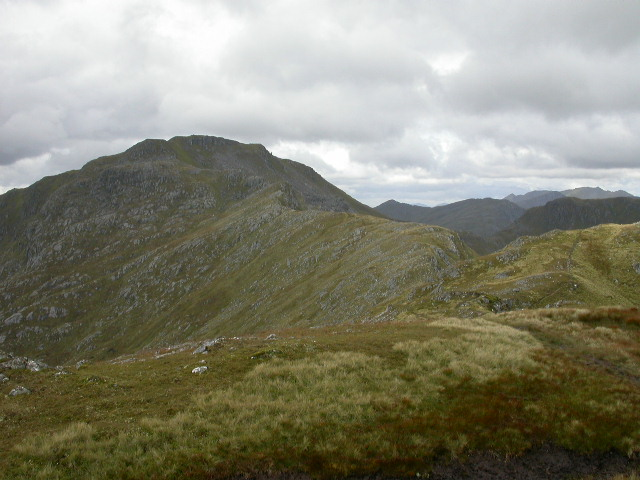
- Sgùrr a' Mhaoraich's summit seen from Sgùrr Coire nan Eiricheallach

Highest point
- Elevation: 1,027 m (3,369 ft)
- Prominence: 706 m (2,316 ft)
- Parent peak: Gleouraich
- Listing: Munro, Marilyn
- Coordinates: 57°06′20″N 05°19′50″W

Naming
- Native name: Scottish Gaelic: Sgùrr a' Mhorair
- English translation: peak of the shellfish
- Pronunciation: Scottish Gaelic: [ˈs̪kuːrˠ ə ˈvɯːɾɪç] English approximation: SKOOR-ə-VOO-rish

Geography
- Location: Highland, Scotland
- OS grid: NG983065
- Topo map: OS Landranger 33

Climbing
- Easiest route: walk

Sgùrr a' Mhaoraich is a Scottish mountain located to the north of Loch Cuaich in the northwestern highlands. It has a height of 1027 m (3369 ft) and is classed as a Munro. Viewed from Kinloch Hourn to the west, or from the north, it shows large, steep, rocky flanks with a complex series of ridges and corries, but like its neighbours such as Gleouraich, its southern side is gentler and grassier.

The mountain is known in Gaelic, and used to be known in English as Sgùrr a' Mhorair, meaning "peak of the nobleman", but has been changed on modern maps to Sgùrr a' Mhaoraich, which derives from the Gaelic maorach meaning shellfish. This may be a reference to the hill's ribbed summit, which has been said to resemble a shell. In the Gaelic periodical Gairm in 1979, an article noted that though the writer had seen the name "Sgùrr a' Mhaoraich" in writing, he had only ever heard "Sgùrr a' Mhorair" spoken and jokes that Gheibhear maoraich air cladach, ach cha do thachair orm riamh buidheann diubh a’ siurradh nam beann - "You find shellfish on the beach, but I've never come across a bunch wandering on the mountains".

The mountain is most commonly climbed from the shores of Loch Cuaich to the south. A stalker's path leads up the Bac nan Canaichean ridge to the subsidiary top of Sgùrr Coire nan Eiricheallach (891 m or 2,923 ft), which is connected to the main summit by a 1.5 km ridge, which has a number of rocky outcrops which can be scrambled over or bypassed. An alternative, and less frequently climbed route is from the northeast end of Gleann Cuaich (Glen Quoich), by way of a stalker's path which runs the length of Coire a' Chaorainn and to the rocky summit of Am Bathaich (892 m or 2,927 ft), and from there south to Sgùrr a' Mhaoraich via a high bealach.
