= Sgùrr nan Coireachan =

Sgùrr nan Coireachan may refer to either of the following mountains in the Scottish Highlands:

- Sgùrr nan Coireachan (Glen Dessarry)
- Sgùrr nan Coireachan (Glenfinnan)
