= Arnisdale =

Coordinates: 57.13°N 05.57°W

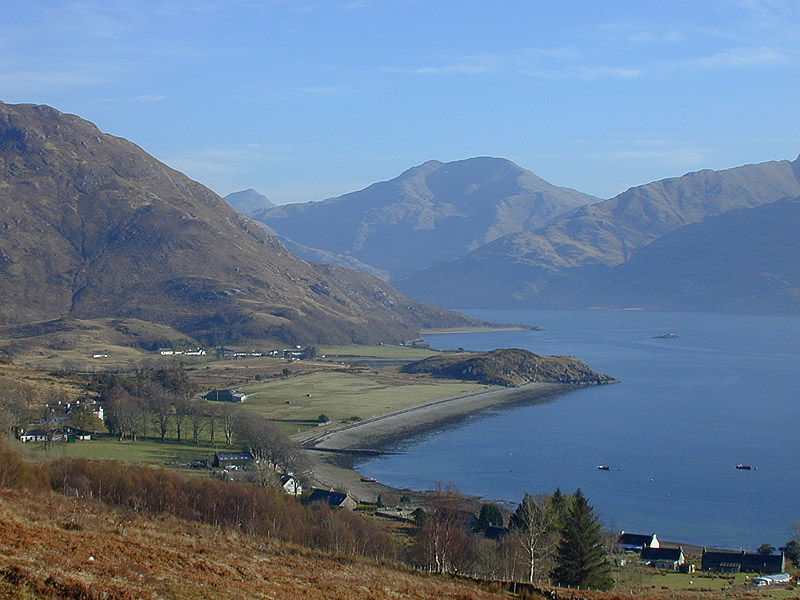
- Looking over on Arnisdale and Loch Hourn

- Location within the Ross and Cromarty area
- OS grid reference: NG8410
- Council area: Highland
- Country: Scotland
- Sovereign state: United Kingdom
- Police: Scotland
- Fire: Scottish
- Ambulance: Scottish
- UK Parliament: Ross, Skye and Lochaber
- Scottish Parliament: Skye, Lochaber and Badenoch

Arnisdale (Scottish Gaelic: Àrnasdal) is a hamlet in the historic county of Inverness-shire in the local authority area of Highlands of Scotland. It lies on the north shore of Loch Hourn, around 10 miles (16 kilometres) down a single-track road from Glenelg. It has a permanent population of around 30 and several holiday cottages. At the end of the community is a large white-painted hunting lodge called Arnisdale House, built by architects Robert John Macbeth & Alexander Ross in 1898–1916. The house was built for Valentine Fleming of the banking family (father of the writer and explorer Peter Fleming and of Ian Fleming, creator of James Bond), who was killed in action in World War I, a year after the house was completed.

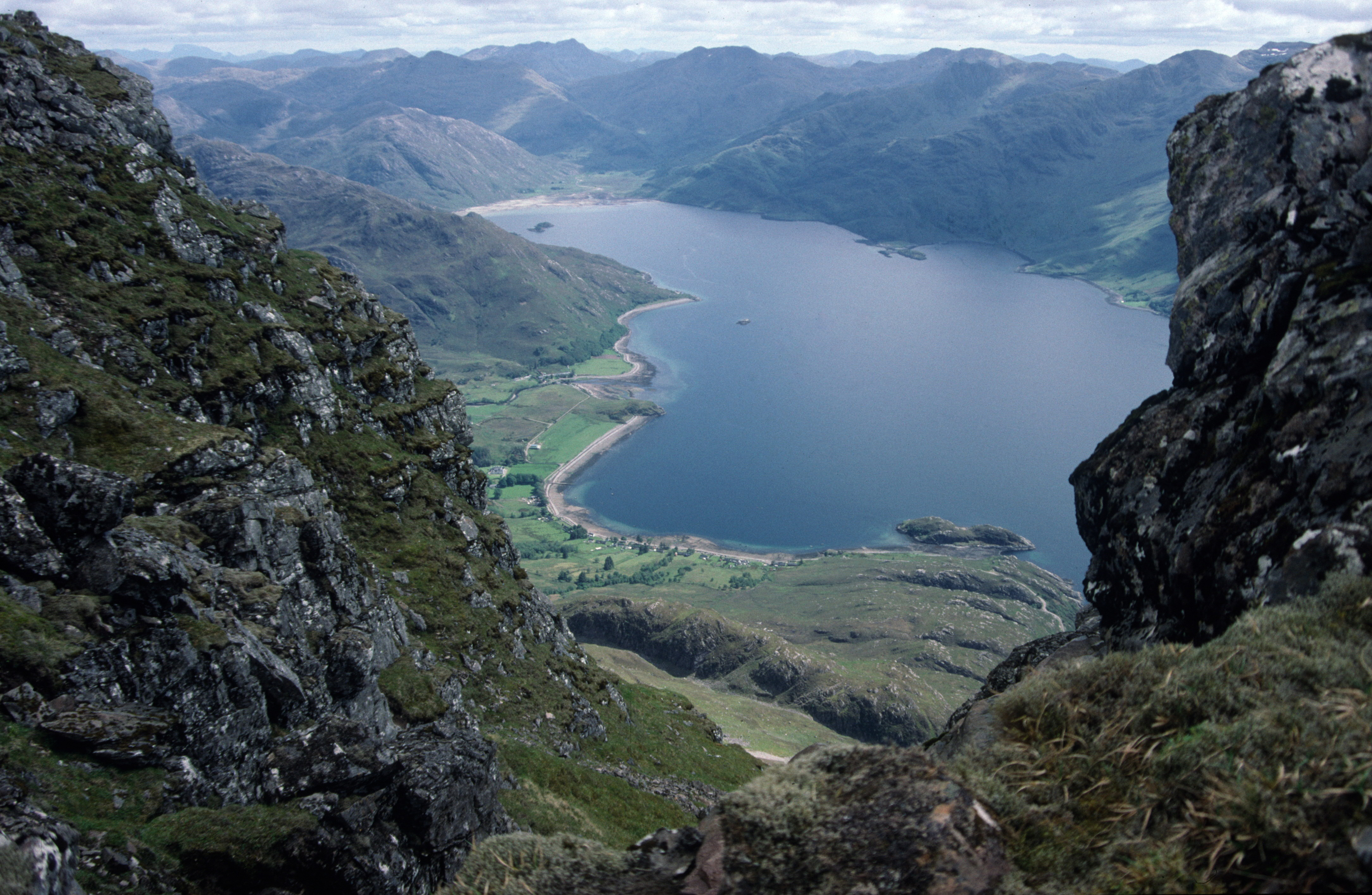
Arnisdale and Corran from Beinn Sgritheall

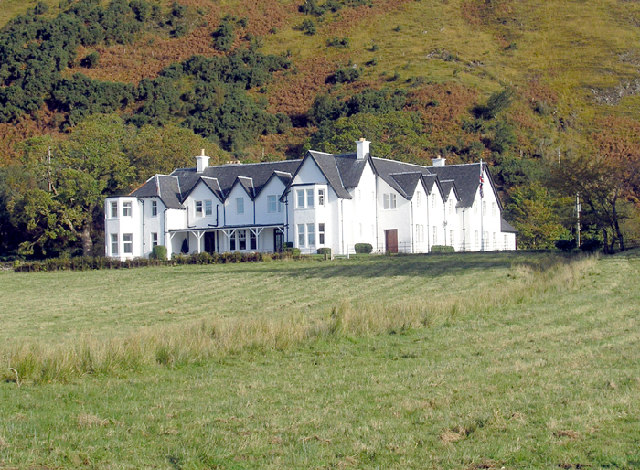
Arnisdale House

Arnisdale is in the Highland Council area.

== Attractions ==
The hamlet is most famous as the closest settlement to Camusfeàrna, the house in which Gavin Maxwell wrote the auto-biographical story of his secluded life with his pet otters, Ring of Bright Water. Terry Nutkins (1946 – 2012) the naturalist, television presenter and author, who had in his boyhood been one of Maxwell's otter keepers, lived at the end of his life near the village.

It was also the departure point during the summer months for the ferry to the Barrisdale on Knoydart, across Loch Hourn, until the ferry stopped operating in 2011. Walkers often come to Arnisdale to climb Beinn Sgritheall.

== 2012 Badger Incident ==
On the 31 October 2012, it was reported that group of badgers living under Arnisdale Free Church were responsible for digging up the ground around the graves in the 130-year-old burial ground in the centre of the hamlet. No human remains were thought to have been disturbed.

== See also ==
- Arnisdale Free Church
