= Luinne Bheinn =

Mountain in Scotland

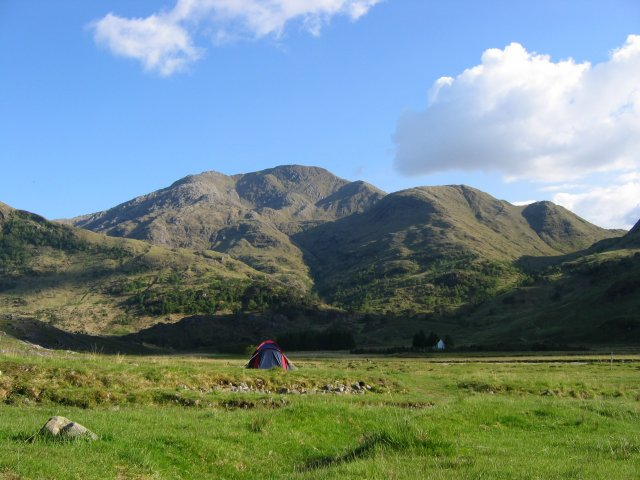
- Luinne Bheinn

Highest point
- Elevation: 939 m (3,081 ft)
- Prominence: 255 m (837 ft)
- Listing: Munro, Marilyn
- Coordinates: 57°02′57″N 5°30′57″W

Geography
- Location: Lochaber, Scotland
- Parent range: Northwest Highlands
- OS grid: NG869007
- Topo map: OS Landranger 33

Luinne Bheinn (939 m) is a mountain in the Northwest Highlands of Scotland, on the Knoydart Peninsula in Lochaber.

The mountain is rough and rocky. The most common route to climb it starts from Inverie.
