= Spidean Mialach =

Mountain in the Northwest Highlands, Scotland

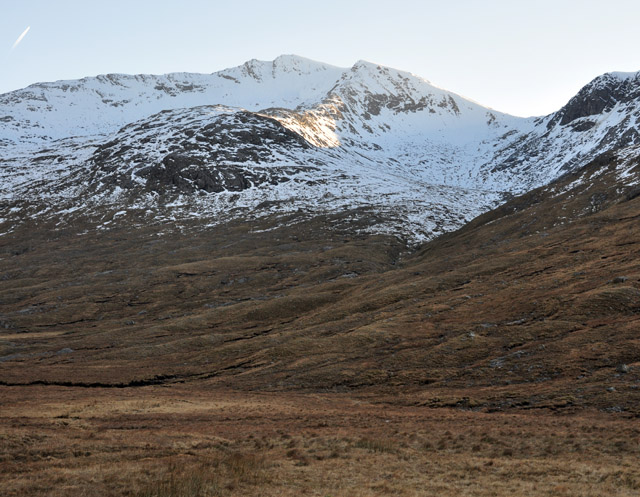
- Spidean Mialach

Highest point
- Elevation: 996 m (3,268 ft)
- Prominence: 257 m (843 ft)
- Listing: Munro, Marilyn
- Coordinates: 57°05′20″N 5°11′37″W

Geography
- Location: Inverness-shire, Scotland
- Parent range: Northwest Highlands
- OS grid: NH065042
- Topo map: OS Landranger 33

Spidean Mialach (996 m) is a mountain in the Northwest Highlands, Scotland, situated on the northern shore of Loch Quoich in Inverness-shire.

One of a pair of two Munros (the other being Gleouraich), it is often climbed in conjunction with its neighbour. Starting in the south, a number of stalkers paths make this one of the easier mountains to climb in the Northwest, despite its isolation.
