= Arnisdale Free Church =

Coordinates: 57.1343°N 5.5625°W

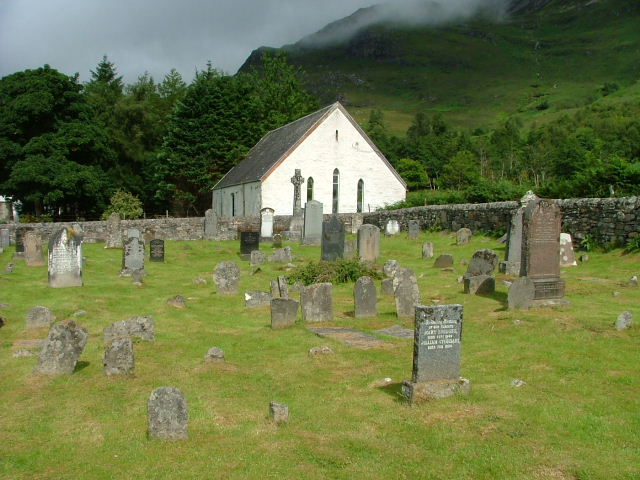
- Arnisdale Free Church of Scotland. Nestling beneath the slopes of Beinn Sgritheall
- Arnisdale Free Church
- Location: Arnisdale
- Country: Scotland
- Denomination: Free Church of Scotland (Continuing)

History
- Founded: Parish 1856

Architecture
- Functional status: church
- Heritage designation: Historic Scotland, ID 275646
- Completed: 1888

Arnisdale Free Church is a church building at one time connected to the Free Church of Scotland. It is sited in Arnisdale, Inverness-shire, Scotland. According to Ewing's The Annals of the Free Church, the original building was constructed in 1856 as a simple meeting-house connected to Glenelg Free Church of Scotland. Canmore (The National Record of the Historical Environment), however, indicates that the current, and probably subsequent, structure - "a functional hall with shouldered arches to its windows and door" - was built in 1888 by architects Matthews and Lawrie. Free Church services were held here until c.2000, when the property was taken over by the Free Church of Scotland (Continuing)

The first minister of the Glenelg Free Church congregation was George Corbet who served both Glenelg and Arnisdale from 1843 to 1863, and was succeeded by John Macleod (1861 to 1886), D. M’Lennan, M.A. (1887-1892), A. J. Watson, M.A. (1893-1896) and Alexander M’Diarmid (1899 — ). For most of the twentieth century the Arnisdale congregation was served under various pastoral arrangements made by the local Free Church Presbytery. In January 2000 a division in the Free Church of Scotland occurred, resulting in a small group of ministers, office bearers and members seceding from the Free Church of Scotland to form the Free Church of Scotland (Continuing). Since then the Free Church of Scotland congregation of Glenelg and Inverinate has served the Free Church community in Arnisdale, with the Free Church of Scotland (Continuing) holding services in the Ceilidh House & Heritage Centre at Corran.'

The whitewashed building was closed for worship in 2017 and subsequently sold. It is listed on Historic Scotland's list of monuments under number ID 275646.
