= The Rough Bounds =

Coordinates: 57°3.5′N 5°40′W

The Rough Bounds (Scottish Gaelic: Na Garbh Chriochan), in the Scottish Highlands, is the area of West Inverness-shire bounded by Loch Hourn, Loch Shiel, and Loch Moidart, consisting of the districts of Knoydart, North Morar, Arisaig and Moidart. The area is famous for its wildness and inaccessibility and remains very sparsely populated.

An anonymous writer in 1750 commented that "all these countries viz. Knoydart, the Two Morrirs, Moydart, and Arisaig, are the most Rough Mountainous and impassible parts in all the Highlands of Scotland, and are commonly called by the Inhabitants of the Neighbouring countries the highlands of the Highlands."

== Prehistory ==
The re-alignment of a 6 km section of the A830 road in Arisaig led to archaeological investigations in 2000–2001 by the Centre for Field Archaeology (CFA), University of Edinburgh, and Headland Archaeology Ltd which found a Bronze Age kerb cairn, turf buildings and shieling huts. The shielings were repeatedly reused through the medieval and post-medieval periods but themselves were on top of Bronze Age remains. Analysis of peat cores revealed a history of continuous but gradual decline in woodland, starting in about 3200 BC and continuing to the present day.

== History ==
=== Early history ===
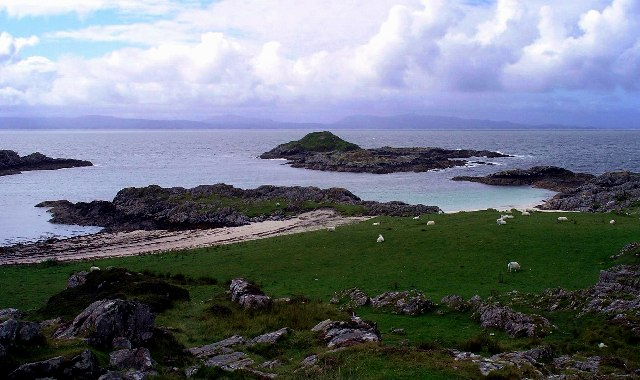
The Arisaig coast

Following raids by Vikings, the Rough Bounds became part of the Kingdom of the Isles, a Norwegian dependency. In the late 11th century, however, Malcolm III of Scotland made a written agreement with Magnus Barelegs, the Norwegian king, which moved the border to the coast; the area thus became Scottish.

In the early 12th century, Somerled, a Norse-Gael of uncertain origin, came into possession of the Rough Bounds and Lorn; no reliable record explains how this happened, but by the 1140s, David I of Scotland's control of the region had been eroded. In the middle of the century, Somerled launched a coup in the Kingdom of the Isles, which resulted in that kingdom joining his other possessions, as a single independent state. Upon Somerled's death, Norwegian authority was restored/established over the areas Somerled had ruled, but in practice the kingdom was divided; the portion containing the Rough Bounds, Uist, and the islands in-between (Eigg and Rhum), became Garmoran, and was ruled by the MacRory, a faction among Somerled's heirs.

=== The Lordship of Garmoran ===
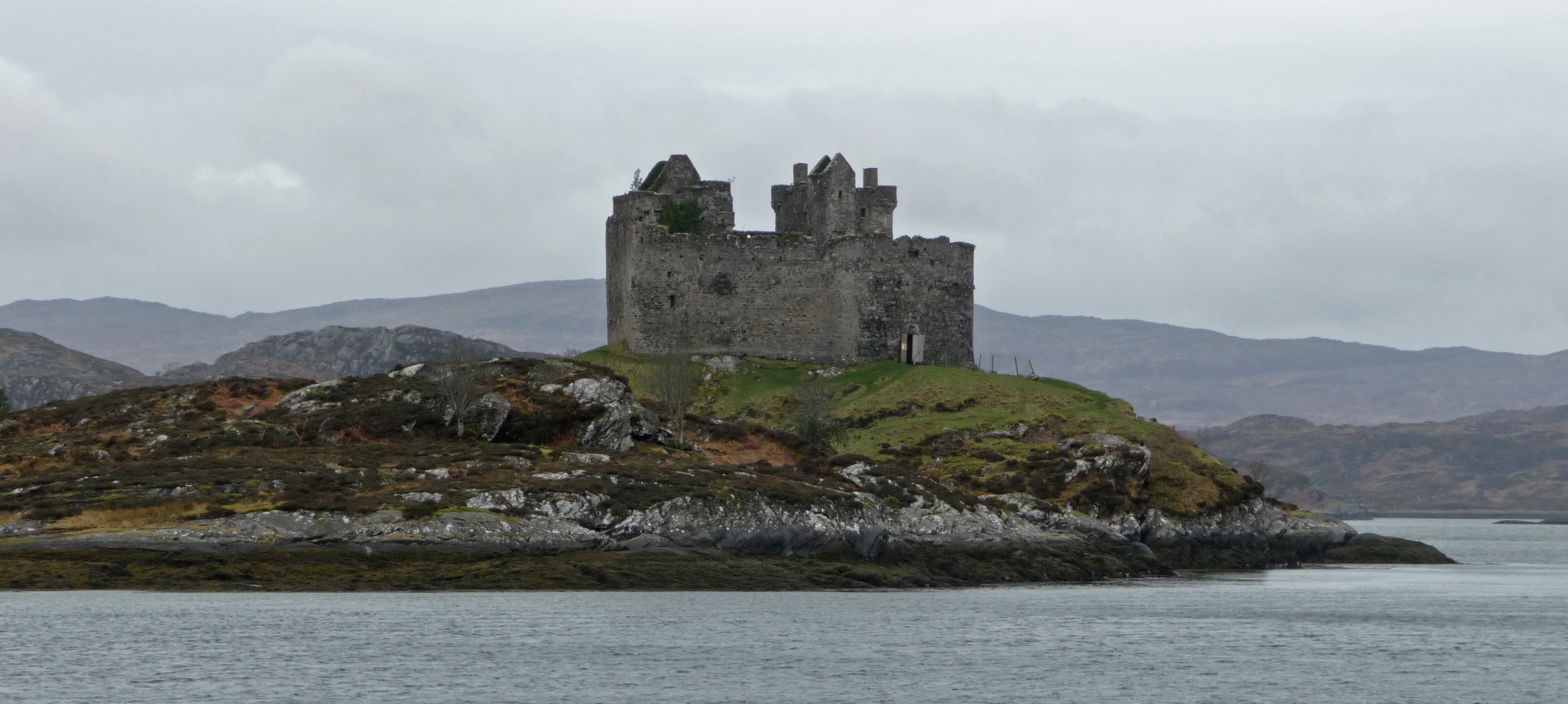
Castle Tioram, capital of Garmoran

Following the 1266 Treaty of Perth, Garmoran became a Scottish crown dependency - the Lordship of Garmoran. At the turn of the century, William I had created the position of Sheriff of Inverness, to be responsible for the Scottish highlands, which theoretically now extended to Garmoran. Most of the remainder of the Kingdom of the Isles had become the Lordship of the Isles, ruled by the MacDonalds (another group of Somerled's descendants).

The Lordship of Garmoran remained under the rule of the MacRory, and their descendants - the Siol Gorrie and Clan Ranald. However, violent disputes between the latter two groups led, in 1427, to king James I executing the leader of the Siol Gorrie, and declaring the Lordship of Garmoran forfeit. This, and the violence, brought the Siol Gorrie to the brink of extinction and they played no further part in regional history.

=== Lairdship grants ===
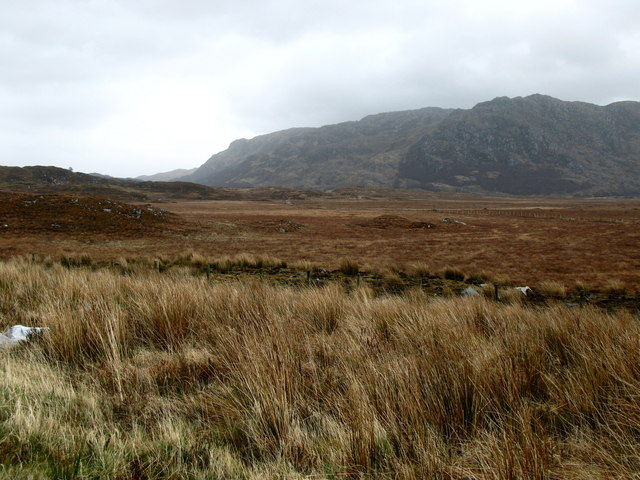
The plain of Mointeach Mhòr

In 1469, James' grandson (James III) granted Lairdship of the lands of mainland Garmoran and North Uist to John of Ross, the Lord of the Isles. In turn, John passed it to his own half-brother, Hugh of Sleat; the grant to Hugh was confirmed by the king in a 1493 charter. Clan Ranald disputed and fought against the charter.

Following Hugh of Sleat's death, in 1498, and for reasons that are not remotely clear, his son John of Sleat immediately resigned, transferring all authority to the king. By this point, John of Ross's conspiratorial ambition had caused the Lordship of the Isles to be forfeited, but in 1501, his heir, Black Donald, launched an insurrection seeking to restore it. Ranald Bane, leader of Clan Ranald, was one of the few MacDonald-descended clan leaders to refuse to support Donald, so in 1505 (shortly before Donald was defeated) Ranald Bane was given the Lairdship of Arisaig and Eigg, as a reward.

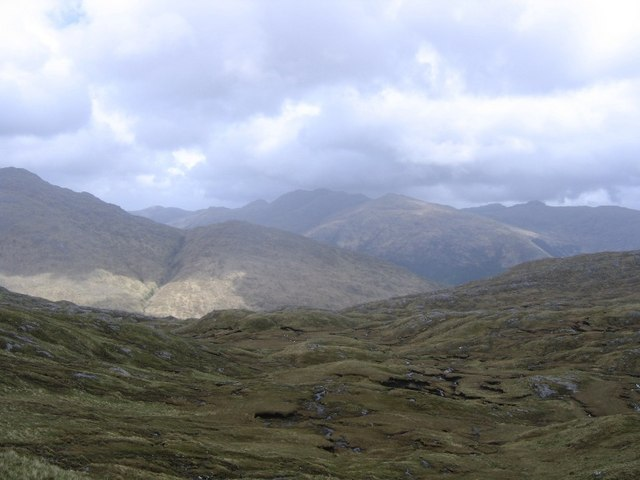
Moidart Bog

In 1520, the excessive cruelty (not described in detail by surviving records) of Ranald Bane's son, Dougall, led to his assassination, and the exclusion of Ranald Bane's descendants from leadership of Clan Ranald. Instead, Ranald Bane's brother, Alexander, took over the leadership. In 1532, the king provided a charter confirming Alexander's son, John Moidartach, as Laird of Arisaig (and Eigg), and making him Laird of Moidart as well. In 1539, however, the king granted Morar to the MacDonells of Glengarry, rather than to the leaders of Clan Ranald; the MacDonnells of Glengarry were an early cadet branch of Clan Ranald.

At a similar time, the king asserts his right to transfer ownership of Knoydart, on the basis that feudal obligations hadn't been upheld for the previous 70 years; quite why he should argue this if the land had been in royal hands since 1498 is still unclear. His 1537 charter transfers lairdship of Knoydart to Ewen Cameron, the leader of Clan Cameron. 73 years later, in 1611, Allan Cameron, their new leader, transferred it to the Macdonells of Glengarry, consolidating the north-south split of Garmoran between the Clan Ranald and the MacDonells of Glengarry. In 1613, the MacDonnels received official confirmation of ownership from the king.

=== Law and order ===
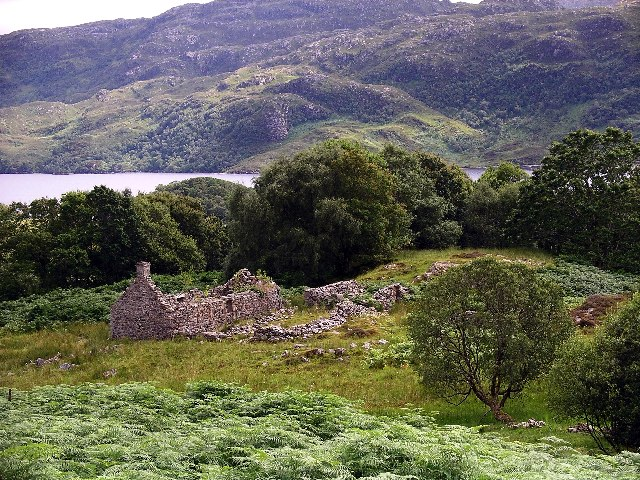
An abandoned house on Morar

In 1509, Alexander, the Earl of Huntly, was made sheriff of Inverness, giving him authority in Garmoran; the position was hereditary. In 1540, John Moidartach was imprisoned by James V (Note: surviving records do not explain why), attempted to give leadership of Clan Ranald to Ranald Gallda (Note: not to be confused with Ranald Bane), uncle of John Moidartach. When the latter was released, in 1542, Ranald Gallda fled, leading to skirmishes between Clan Ranald (led by John Moidartach) and supporters of Ranald Gallda, which only ceased when the Earl of Huntly intervened. In turn, this led to the Battle of the Shirts.

The victory of John Moidartach (and Clan Cameron) in the battle, against the Earl of Huntly and Ranald Gallda, lead to the Earl of Huntly leaving the Rough Bounds alone, and only trying to enforce royal authority in peripheral areas. Nevertheless, when Mary of Guise became regent (for her daughter Mary), in 1554, she ordered an attack on the Rough Bounds. The Campbells attacked Castle Tioram from the sea, but the Earl of Huntly was unwilling to bring troops into the Rough Bounds, and the assault failed.

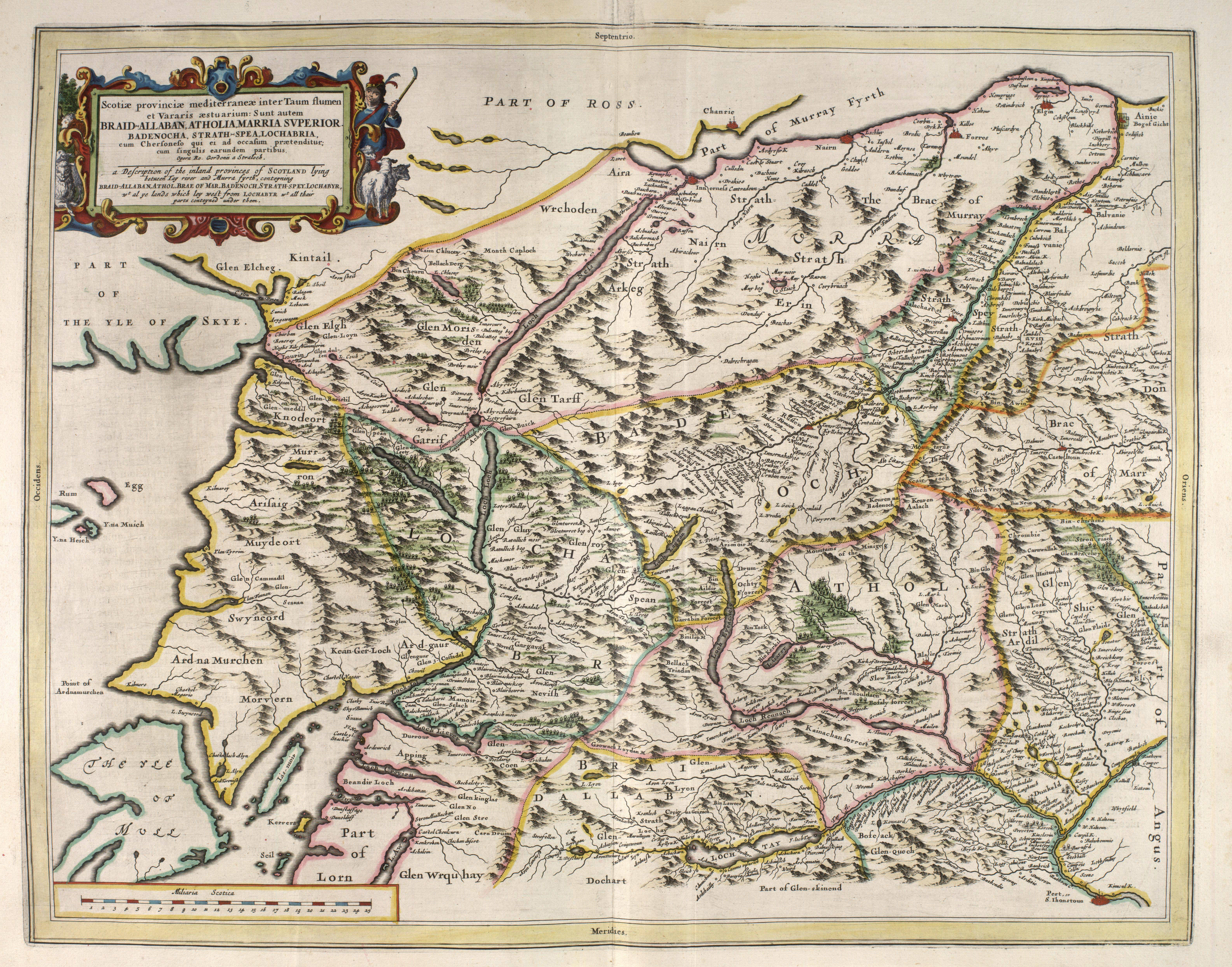
Blaeu's 1654 map, showing the Rough Bounds' nameless separation from other provinces

Over the course of the 16th century, following an inheritance dispute over the lands of MacDonalds of Lochalsh, there were several violent encounters between the MacDonells of Glengarry and the MacKenzies. In 1592, the leader of the MacDonells of Glengarry agreed a contract of mutual aid with the Earl of Huntly. The MacKenzies now sought to complain about MacDonell behaviour in court, but the MacDonell leadership wouldn't turn up, so in 1602, the MacKenzies attacked Morar, leading to the Battle of Morar. Following this, peace agreements reduced the conflict between local clans, and attentions turned to national matters.

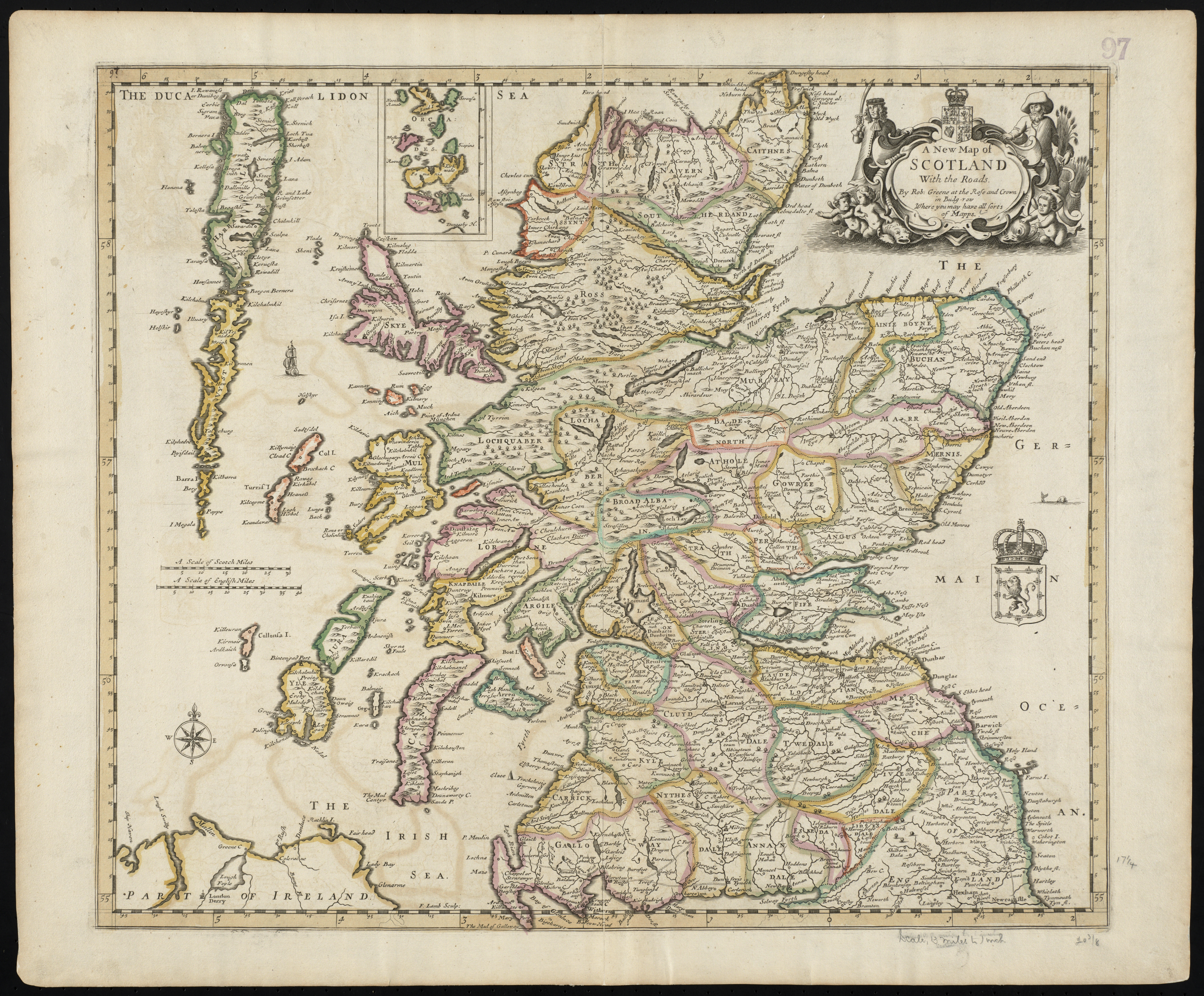
A 1689 map showing Loquaber (the Rough Bounds) in green, Lochaber in yellow

In this period, the term Garmoran appears to have dropped out of use. The Earls of Huntly had been granted the adjacent Lordship of Lochaber, in 1500, and Garmoran gradually acquired a perception of being association with it. Yet though a 1669 map names the Rough Bounds as Loquaber, it is clearly marked as outside the borders of Lochaber. The lands formerly of Garmoran remained distinct from Moray and Lochaber even into the 18th century. In Moll's pre-1732 map, the area is clearly distinguished from these neighbouring provinces, but has no name itself, other than the description the territory west from Lochaber. This nameless distinction had already been established in Blaeu's 1654 map, where the lands are simply those that lay west from Lochaber.

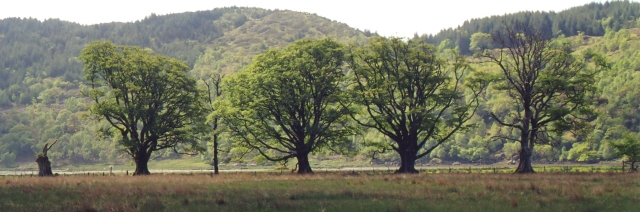
The Seven Men of Moidart, commemorating the men who went with Bonnie Prince Charlie into exile

In 1609, the Statutes of Iona attempted to enforce the Scottish reformation in the highlands, but the Rough Bounds remained resolutely Roman Catholic, and sided with the Royalists during the Civil War. In the following century, the area became a hotbed of Jacobite sympathy, and even resorted to burning down Tioram Castle, in order to prevent it falling into anti-Jacobite hands. Following the failure of the Jacobite rising of 1745, it was the last part of Scotland in which Bonnie Prince Charlie found sanctuary, and the one from which he left for exile in France, on 20 September 1746.

=== Later history ===
A succession of flamboyant but unsuccessful chiefs (including especially Alexander Ranaldson MacDonell of Glengarry [1771–1828] and Ranald George Macdonald of Clanranald [1788–1873]) resulted ultimately in the area passing into other hands.

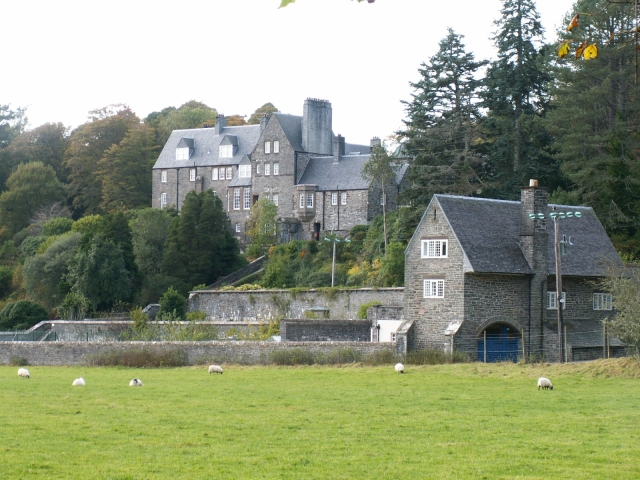
Arisaig House, headquarters for the SOE in Scotland

The Rough Bounds remained difficult to access well into the 20th century; indeed Moidart only received a road connection (the A861) in 1966, and had to be accessed by foot or by ferry. This remoteness made it ideal for practice sites for covert operations in Occupied Europe, during World War II. The Special Operations Executive (SOE) established their Scottish headquarters just outside Arisaig, and constructed paramilitary training bases throughout the region. In Moidart, HMS Dorlin was established, and used for training of Royal Navy Beach Signals and Royal Signals sections.

The remoteness also ensured that the area remained strongly Scottish Gaelic speaking until the mid 20th century. In the 1881 census, with around 90% of the population able to speak Gaelic and over a third unable to speak English. By 2001, the share of Gaelic speakers had declined to under 15% of habitual residents.
