= Sgùrr nan Coireachan (Glen Dessarry) =

Mountain in Scotland

Coordinates: 57.007°N 5.407°W

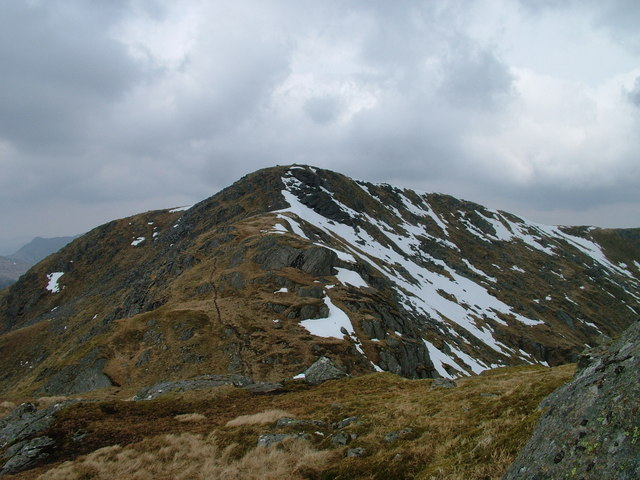
- The summit of Sgùrr nan Coireachan

Highest point
- Elevation: 953 m (3,127 ft)
- Prominence: 220 m (720 ft)
- Listing: Munro, Marilyn

Geography
- Location: Lochaber, Scotland
- Parent range: Northwest Highlands
- OS grid: NM933958
- Topo map: OS Landranger 33, 40

Sgùrr nan Coireachan (953 m) is a mountain in the Northwest Highlands of Scotland. It lies in the Lochaber region, near the head of the remote Glen Dessarry.

A steep mountain with a mixture of rocky and grassy slopes, it is often climbed as part of the Sgurr na Ciche ridge. Climbs usually start from Loch Arkaig to the east.
