= Gleouraich =

Mountain in Scotland

Coordinates: 57.097447°N 5.236745°W

- Scottish Gaelic: Gleadhraich
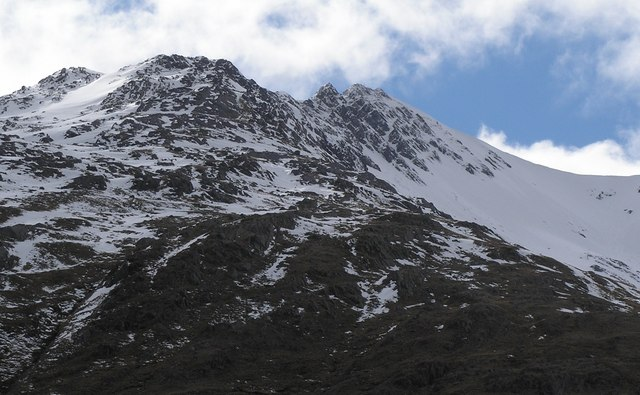
- Gleouraich

Highest point
- Elevation: 1,035 m (3,396 ft)
- Prominence: 765 m (2,510 ft)
- Parent peak: A' Chralaig
- Listing: Munro, Marilyn

Naming
- English translation: roaring noise
- Language of name: Gaelic
- Pronunciation: Scottish Gaelic: [ˈklɤːɾɪç]

Geography
- Location: Highland, Scotland
- OS grid: NH039053
- Topo map: OS Landranger 33, OS Explorer 414

Climbing
- Easiest route: walk

Gleouraich (Scottish Gaelic: Gleadhraich) is a Scottish mountain located to the north of Loch Quoich in the northwestern highlands. It has a height of 1035 m (3396 ft) and is classed as a Munro. The mountain's main aspects contrast with each other; the south side of the mountain is a gentle, grassy slope, but its north face is steep, dark rock, with a complex array of ridges and corries.

The mountain is separated from its neighbour, Spidean Mialach, by a high ridge, and the two are commonly climbed together from the south, making use of the network of stalker's paths. The ascents of the two mountains are considered to be among the easiest in the area.
