= Loch Nevis =

Sea loch in Lochaber, Scotland

Coordinates: 57°0′N 5°41.5′W

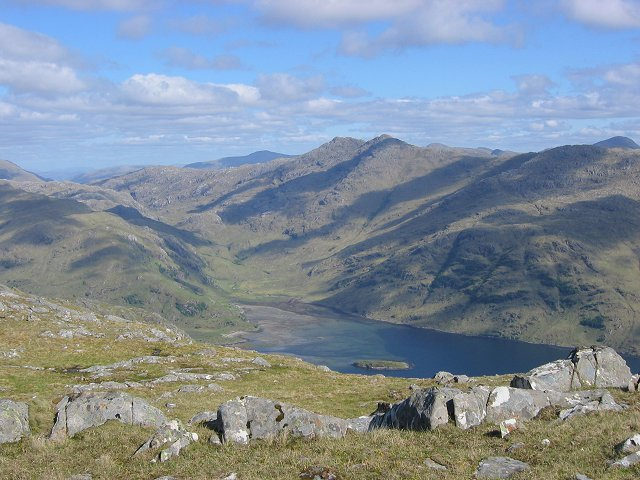

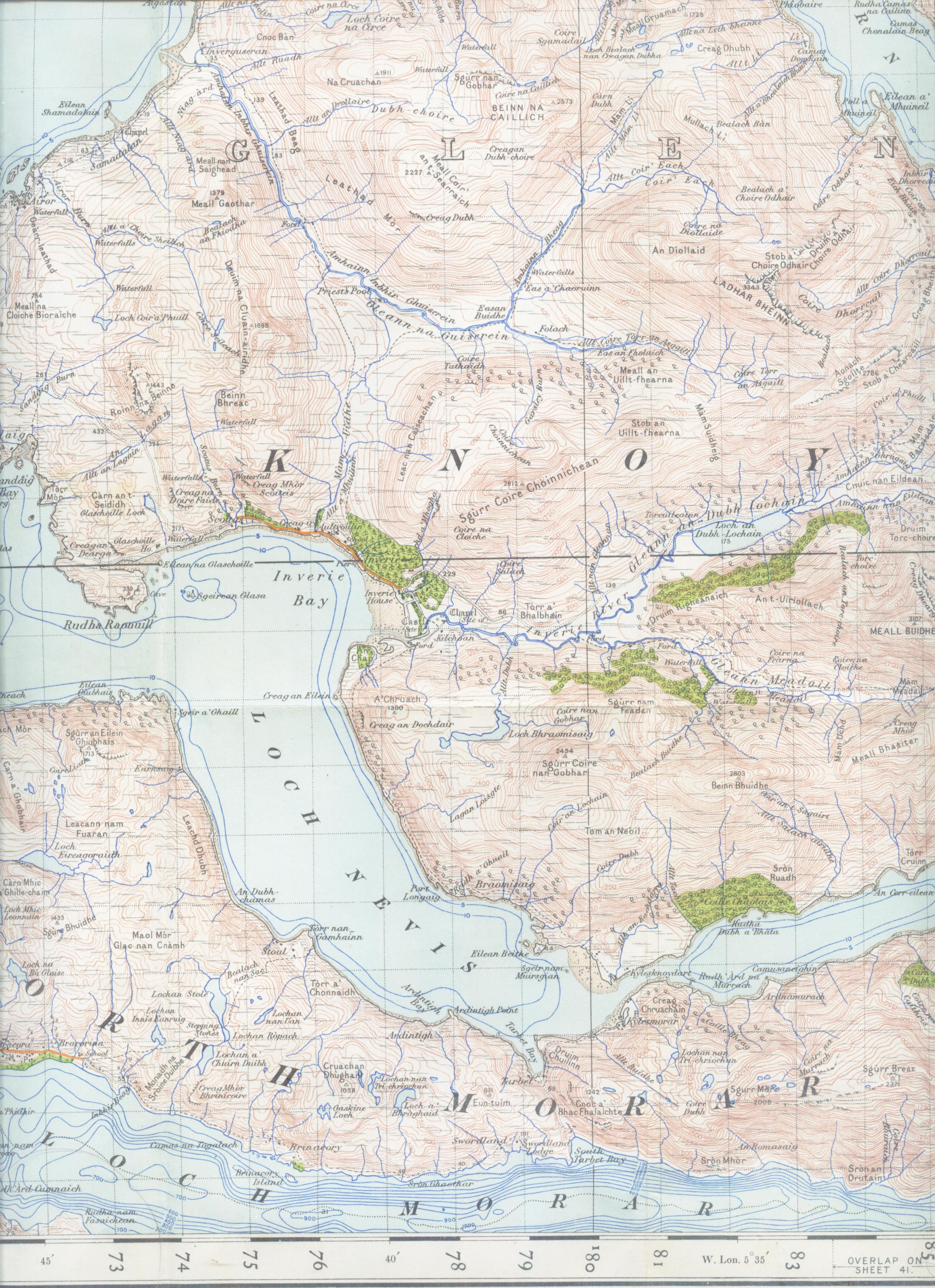
1947

Loch Nevis (Scottish Gaelic: Loch Nibheis) is a sea loch in Lochaber on the west coast of Scotland.

It runs inland from the Sound of Sleat, and is bounded on the north by the peninsula of Knoydart and on the south by North Morar (the region north of Loch Morar, and containing the village of Morar).

Two ferry services cross Loch Nevis. One, a small passenger ferry, links the town of Mallaig with the village of Inverie on Knoydart and the hamlet of Tarbet. The other, Knoydart Seabridge, a daily ferry service which can transport vehicles as well as passengers and equipment, sails directly between Mallaig and Inverie.

The ferry operated by Caledonian MacBrayne to the Small Isles from Mallaig is named after the loch, the MV Lochnevis.

Loch Nevis contains a number of fish farms, and in May 1998 it was the location of the first recorded outbreak of infectious salmon anaemia in Scotland.
