= Ladhar Bheinn =

Mountain in Scotland

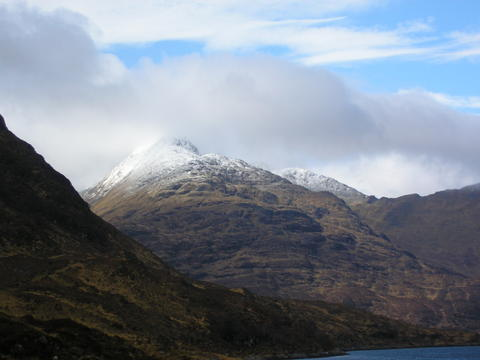
- Ladhar Bheinn seen from the shores of Loch Hourn

Highest point
- Elevation: 1,020 m (3,350 ft)
- Prominence: 795 m (2,608 ft)Ranked 37th in British Isles
- Parent peak: Carn Eige
- Listing: Munro, Marilyn
- Coordinates: 57.075263°N 5.591745°W

Naming
- English translation: Hill of the hoof or claw
- Language of name: Gaelic
- Pronunciation: Scottish Gaelic: [ˈl̪ˠɤ.əɾveɲ] English approximation: LAR-ven

Geography
- Location: Knoydart, Scotland
- Parent range: Northwest Highlands
- OS grid: NG823039
- Topo map: OS Landranger 33

Ladhar Bheinn is the highest mountain in the Knoydart region of the Highlands of Scotland. It is the most westerly Munro on the Scottish mainland.

The mountain may be climbed from Barrisdale to the northeast or Inverie to the south. From Barrisdale the mountain may be climbed as part of circuit of Coire Dhorrcaill; this route involves a certain amount of scrambling, particularly on the section immediately north of the subsidiary summit of Stob a' Chearcaill.
