= Knoydart =

Coordinates: 57.07°N 5.66°W

Knoydart: Scottish Gaelic: Cnòideart
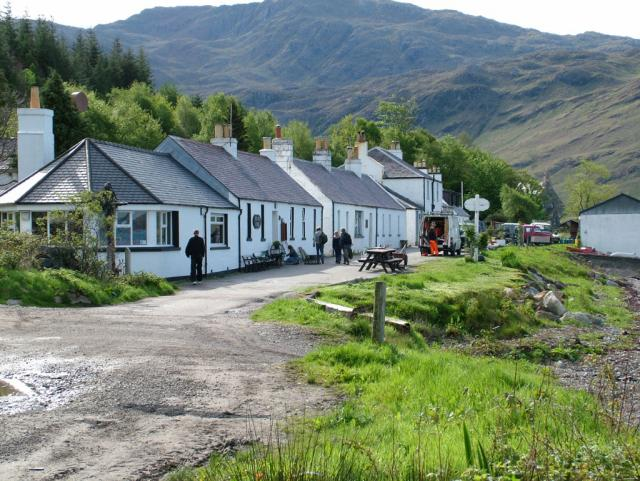
- Inverie on the Knoydart peninsula

- Location within the Highland council area
- Population: 157
- Community council: Mallaig
- Council area: Highland
- Lieutenancy area: Inverness
- Country: Scotland
- Sovereign state: United Kingdom
- Post town: MALLAIG
- Postcode district: PH41
- Dialling code: 01687
- UK Parliament: Inverness, Skye and West Ross-shire
- Scottish Parliament: Skye, Lochaber and Badenoch

Knoydart National Scenic Area
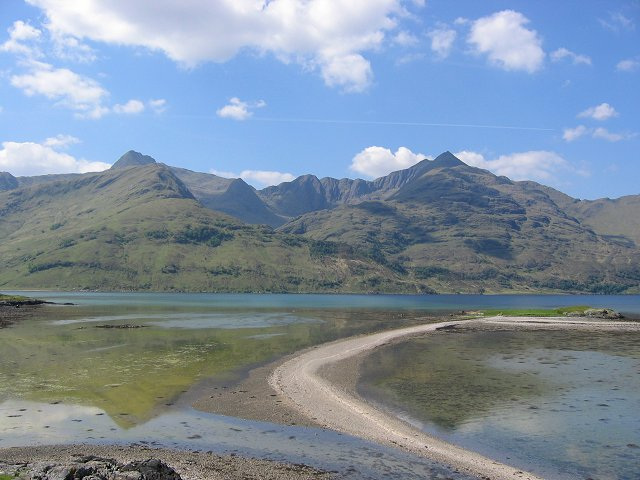
- Ladhar Beinn from Eileann Choinneach
- Interactive map of Knoydart National Scenic Area
- Location: Lochaber, Scotland
- Area: 507 km^{2} (196 sq mi)
- Established: 1981
- Governing body: NatureScot

Knoydart /ˈnɔɪdərt, ˈnɔɪdɑːrt/ (Scottish Gaelic: Cnòideart) is a peninsula in Lochaber, Highland, on the west coast of Scotland. Knoydart is sandwiched between Lochs Nevis and Hourn — often translated as "Loch Heaven" (from the Gaelic Loch Néimh) and "Loch Hell" (Gaelic: Loch Iutharn) respectively, although the somewhat poetic nature of these derivations is disputed. Forming the northern part of what is traditionally known as na Garbh-Chrìochan or "the Rough Bounds", because of its harsh terrain and remoteness, Knoydart is also referred to as "Britain's last wilderness". It is only accessible by boat, or by a 16-mile (26 km) walk through rough country, and the seven miles (11 km) of tarred road are not connected to the UK road system.

Knoydart is designated as one of the forty national scenic areas in Scotland, which are defined so as to identify areas of exceptional scenery and to ensure their protection from inappropriate development. The designated area covers 50,696 ha (125,270 acres) in total, of which 40,201 ha (99,340 acres) is on land, with a further 10,495 ha (25,930 acres) being marine (i.e. below low tide level).

The area is popular with hill walkers, mountaineers, sailors and wildlife enthusiasts. It includes the Munros of Ladhar Bheinn (1020 m), Luinne Bheinn (939 m), Meall Buidhe (946 m) and Sgurr na Cìche (1040 m). The peninsula also contains six Corbetts, including Ben Aden (887 m) and Beinn na Caillich (785 m).

== History ==
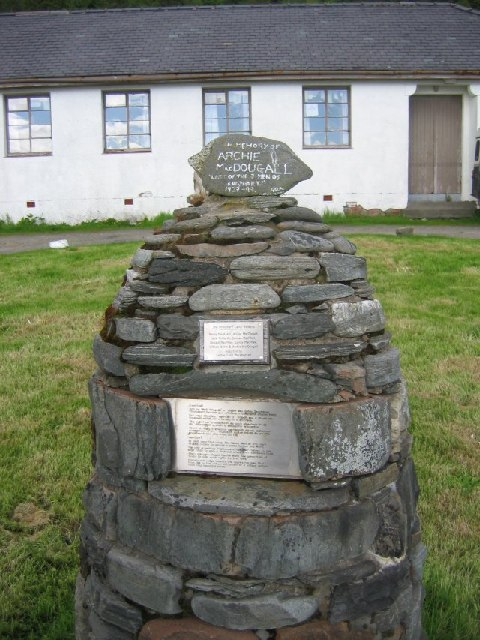
Memorial commemorating the Seven Men at Inverie.

Knoydart formed part of the kingdom ruled over by Somerled (died 1164), before passing to the Clann Ruaidhrí branch of his descendants – the eventual heiress of whom married John of Islay (died circa 1386). Members of Clan Donald held Knoydart from the 15th century to the beginning of the 17th century is generally believed to have descended from Allan Macdonald, 2nd of Clanranald (died circa 1429). However, in the early 17th century, Macdonell of Glengarry succeeded in wresting control of Knoydart from Clanranald, receiving official confirmation of his ownership from the king in 1613. Prior to the 1745 Jacobite rising the population numbered nearly a thousand. There was much emigration, mainly to Canada (Knoydart, Nova Scotia is named after the community).

In an April 1787 letter from Moidart to the Congregation for Propaganda in Rome, Fr. Austin MacDonald wrote, "On account of the emigration of the people of Knoydart to Canada, along with their priest; it fell to me in the autumn to attend to those who were left behind, and during the winter to the people of Moydart (sic) as well. Although not less than 600 Catholics went to America, still I administered the Sacraments to over 500 souls who remained. The overpopulation of these districts, together with the oppression of the landlords, are the principal causes of the departure of so many, not only among the Catholics, but also among the Protestants."

Despite this emigration, the population remained at nearly a thousand in 1841.

In 1852 four hundred of the inhabitants were given notice of eviction for the following year and offered passages overseas, originally to Australia, but later their destination was changed to Canada. On 9 August 1853 three hundred and thirty inhabitants from the west coast of the peninsula went on board the Sillery and left for Canada. However, 11 families comprising over 60 people refused to go and the story of their eviction became notorious as part of the Highland Clearances. Knoydart was finally sold by the MacDonell family in 1856, passing into the hands of an Ayrshire ironmaster, James Baird of Cambusdoon.

In 1948, an unsuccessful land raid was undertaken by the "Seven Men of Knoydart", who attempted to claim land in the ownership of the estate for their own use. Their claims were contested by the estate owner, the Second Baron Brocket, who took the case to the Court of Session which ruled against the land-raiders. An appeal to the Secretary of State for Scotland was rejected and the Seven Men gave up their fight to obtain crofts on Knoydart. A cairn commemorating their land raid was unveiled at Inverie in 1981.

== Modern ownership ==
The Knoydart Foundation was established in 1997 to take ownership of the 17,500-acre (7,100 ha) Knoydart Estate which makes up much of the peninsula, including the village of Inverie. The Foundation, which is a registered charity under Scottish law, bought the estate in 1999. It is a partnership of local residents, the Highland Council, the Chris Brasher Trust, and the John Muir Trust. The foundation aim is to "manage the Knoydart Estate as an area of employment and settlement on the Knoydart Peninsula without detriment to its natural beauty and character and to seek and encourage the preservation of its landscape, wildlife, natural resources, culture and rural heritage."

The neighbouring privately owned Kilchoan Estate was part of the foundation when it was set up, but have since resigned their directorship. Kilchoan Estate covers 13,212 acres (5,347 ha) of the peninsula, and lies to the east of the Knoydart Foundation land. Other landholdings on Knoydart include the 8,080-acre (3,270 ha) Camusrory Estate (lying to the east of the Kilchoan Estate), and the 14,230-acre (5,760 ha) Barisdale Estate on the northern side of the peninsula, which extends as far east as Kinloch Hourn. 3,063 acres (1,240 ha) of land on the northern slopes of Ladhar Bheinn is owned by the John Muir Trust, one of the participants in the Knoydart Foundation.

== Infrastructure ==
Inverie is the main settlement on the peninsula, which has a resident population of 98 adults. There is a post office, a primary school, a brewery and a variety of accommodation for visitors, including B&Bs, bunkhouses and self-catering accommodation. The Old Forge Inn, Knoydart's only pub, is the most remote public house in mainland Britain.

A vehicle track runs from Inverie to the smaller settlement of Airor, on the west side of the peninsula, a little over 8 miles (13 km). On its way to Airor, the track passes the settlements of Scottas, Sandaig and Doune. The track is a designated public highway and is maintained by the Highland Council – however in common with the Small Isles, a resident or visitors permit is required to drive on the road.

The Highland Council-subsidised ferry is operated from Mallaig to Inverie by Western Isles Cruises, previously known as Bruce Watt Cruises. For a period of three years Knoydart Sea Bridge had the council contract; this reverted to Western Isles Cruises on 1 April 2016. Various passenger and equipment services are offered by private boat operators. The Foundation operates a hydro-electric scheme which provides power to Inverie as the area is entirely off the national grid. The scheme is almost entirely dependent on unpaid volunteers and the current pipeline will need replacing in the near future. As a result, the Knoydart community's current focus is coming up with a solution to ensure a continued power supply and ultimately that living on Knoydart remains viable.

In May 2005 the Highlands and Islands Community Energy Company hosted its first conference in Inverie, during which the company was officially launched. A new pier at Inverie was officially opened on 24 August 2006 by Tavish Scott MSP. In 2019 the Knoydart Foundation are celebrating 20 years of community ownership. They are fundraising for and undertaking extensive renovations to Knoydart Community Hall, which provides an essential meeting space and venue for visiting bands and musicians, sports and activities, community events, school, Foundation and Ranger events, activities and meetings, and parties and weddings.

As of March 2022, the Knoydart community owns the most remote mainland pub in the UK, The Old Forge, after buying the pub's building and making the essential renovations. Old Forge and the village itself can only be accessed by walking for 18 miles (29 km) or crossing the sea for 7 miles (11 km). It is expected that the pub will attract thousands of visitors in the upcoming years.

Knoydart is not connected to the National Grid, it gets its electricity from a 280 kW hydroelectric scheme run by a community trust called Knoydart Renewables.

== Natural environment ==
The underlying geology of Knoydart consists mainly of mica-schist and quartz-feldspar of the type associated with the Moine thrust, along with some areas of Lewisian gneiss around Loch Hourn. The landscape shows many signs of glaciation, with deep fjord-like sea lochs, hanging valleys, corries, arêtes and moraines. The rebound effect that followed the melting of the glaciers at the end of the ice age has led to the formation of raised beaches.

Birchwoods grow on the steep slopes of the glens and above the shoreline, and there are some areas of Caledonian pinewoods around Barrisdale. In common with much of the highlands, historic overgrazing, first by sheep and latterly by deer (predominantly red deer), has led to a reduction in the amount of forested land. The deer population is therefore managed by culling in order to allow existing native woodland to regenerate over the long term. The estates on the western part of the peninsula cooperate in this aim via the West Knoydart Deer Management Group, whilst the more easterly estates form the Knoydart Deer Management Group, whose area takes in much of The Rough Bounds of Knoydart. There was controversy in 2015 following culling on the John Muir Trust land in the north of Knoydart, which resulted in some deer carcasses being left on the open hillside rather than being extracted for use as venison.

Wildlife in the area includes badgers, pine marten, otters, red deer, buzzards, golden eagles and sea eagles; there are also two small herds of feral goats. There is a wildlife hide on the beach near Inverie. The seas to the west of Knoydart are designated as a Special Area of Conservation due their importance for harbour porpoises.

== Gallery ==
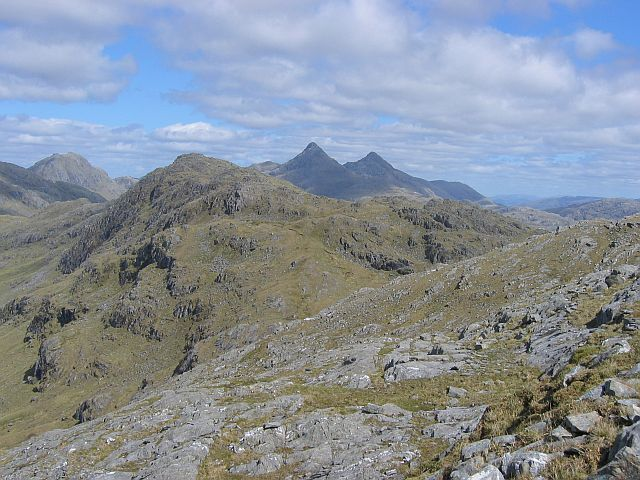
The interior of Knoydart

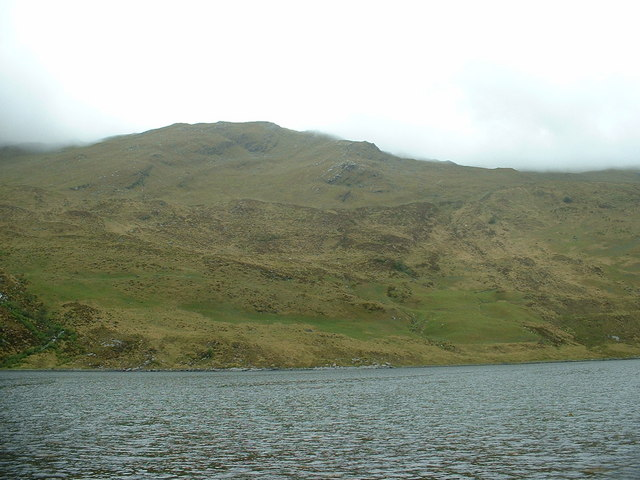
Knoydart from Loch Hourn

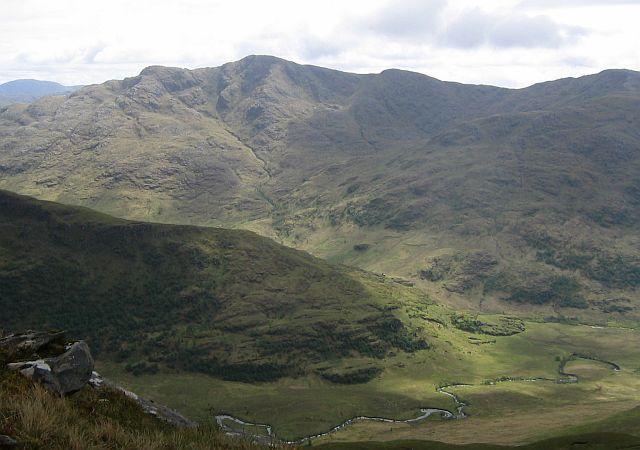
Southern Knoydart

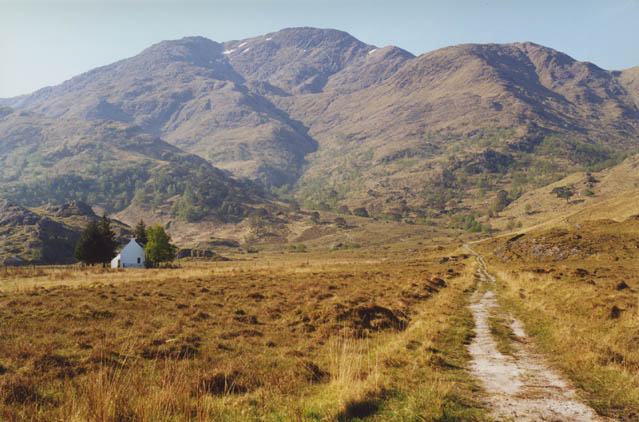
A rare plain
