= Inverie =

Coordinates: 57.038°N 5.683°W

Inverie: Scottish Gaelic: Inbhir Aoidh
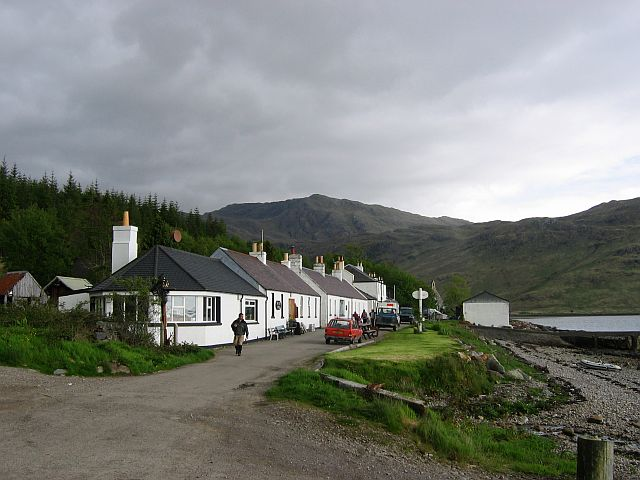
- Inverie village

- Location within the Lochaber area
- Population: 104 (2011)
- OS grid reference: NG766000
  - Edinburgh: 125 mi (201 km)
- Council area: Highland
- Country: Scotland
- Sovereign state: United Kingdom
- Post town: MALLAIG
- Postcode district: PH41
- Dialling code: 01687
- Police: Scotland
- Fire: Scottish
- Ambulance: Scottish
- UK Parliament: Inverness, Skye and West Ross-shire
- Scottish Parliament: Skye, Lochaber and Badenoch

Inverie (/ˌɪnvəˈriː/; Scottish Gaelic: Inbhir Aoidh) is the main village on the Knoydart peninsula in the Scottish Highlands. It is located on the north side of Loch Nevis and, although on the mainland of Britain, the network of single-track roads surrounding the village is not connected to the rest of the British road network.

Inverie is only accessible by a 17-mile (27-kilometre) hike over mountainous terrain or by a regular 7-mile (11-kilometre) ferry from Mallaig. This physical isolation gives the village a Guinness National Record for remoteness within the United Kingdom.

== Geography ==
Inverie lies on the north side of Loch Nevis. On approach by sea, Sgùrr Coire Choinnichean at 769 m (2,523 ft) forms an impressive backdrop.

The Inverie ferry sails from Mallaig. It runs several times a day year-round with a second, competing ferry service, MV Western Isles, operating on weekdays from the start of April to the end of October.

== Local people ==
- Alasdair mac Mhaighstir Alasdair (c. 1698–1770), poet who wrote many immortal works of Scottish Gaelic literature and local Tacksman of Clan MacDonald of Clanranald.

== Amenities ==
The Old Forge pub at Inverie holds the Guinness World Record for the remotest pub in mainland Great Britain, being furthest from roads connected to the national network in time and journey distance.

After being owned and operated for 10 years by Belgian Jean-Pierre Robinet, in March 2022 it was purchased as community property by the residents of the Knoydart peninsula through The Old Forge Community Benefit Society. The pub was closed from January 2023 to early August 2023 for renovations, and then re-opened for business, and is now a community-operated public house.

A few bed and breakfasts compete with rental lodges, cottages, and a campsite for tourists' patronage throughout the year. Knoydart Lodge and the Hide opened as luxury accommodation in the 21st century, and there is a shop and a meal caterer.

Knoydart is not on Scotland’s electricity grid. Instead, an offshoot of the village's Foundation runs a hydroelectric micro grid serving the community of about a hundred homes and businesses. Power comes from the damming of a loch about 1000 feet (300 metres) above Inverie. The head of water is sufficient to produce 288 kilowatts, which is fed around the community by an 11 kilovolt 3 phase grid. There are also a couple of diesel generators in Inverie for emergencies and there is enough renewable power to run services like the pub and shop completely greenly. There are also plans to increase the hydro generating capacity as more residents get electric vehicles, reducing the need to bring in petrol via the ferry.

== Gallery ==
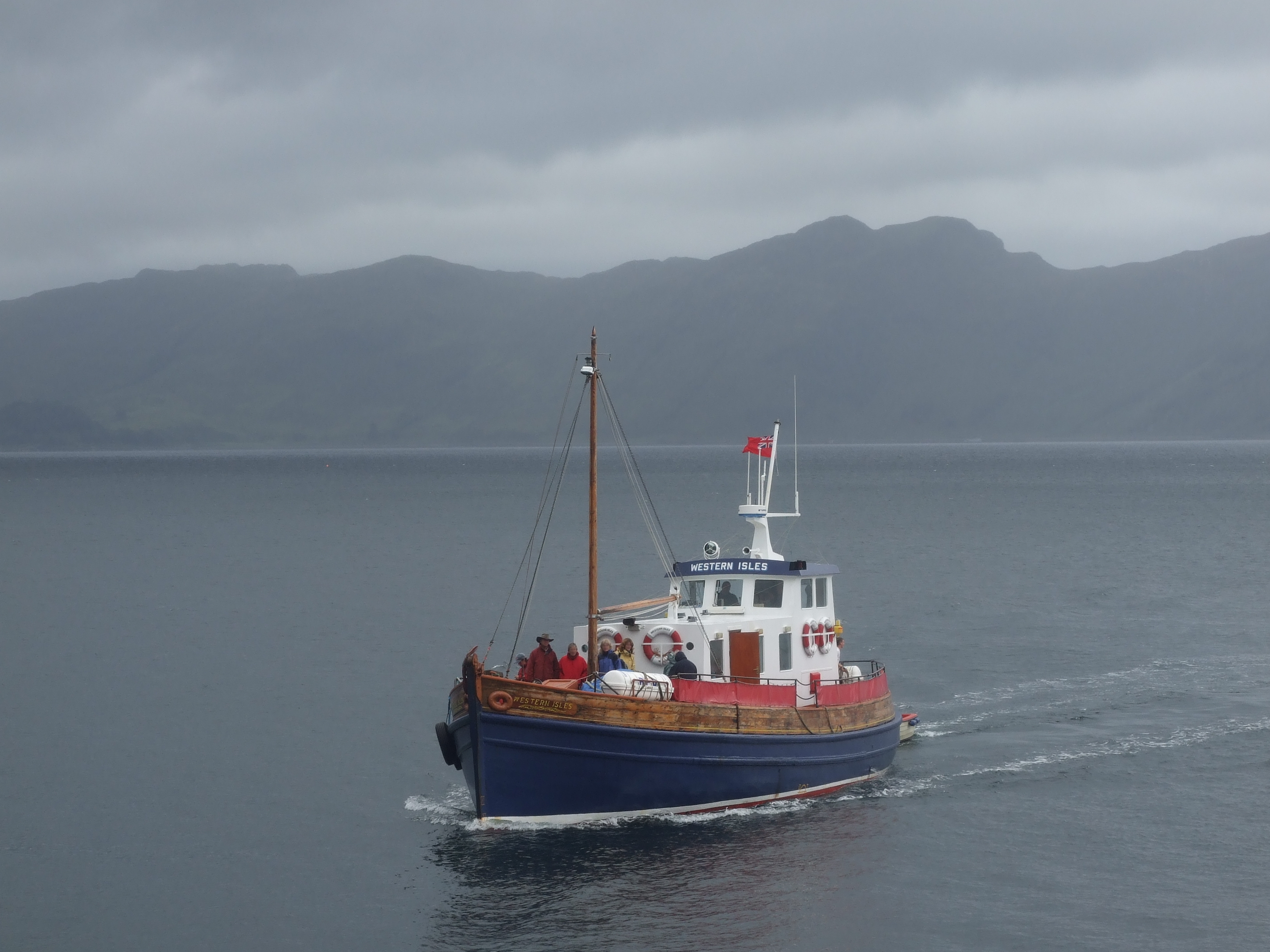
The ferry to Mallaig

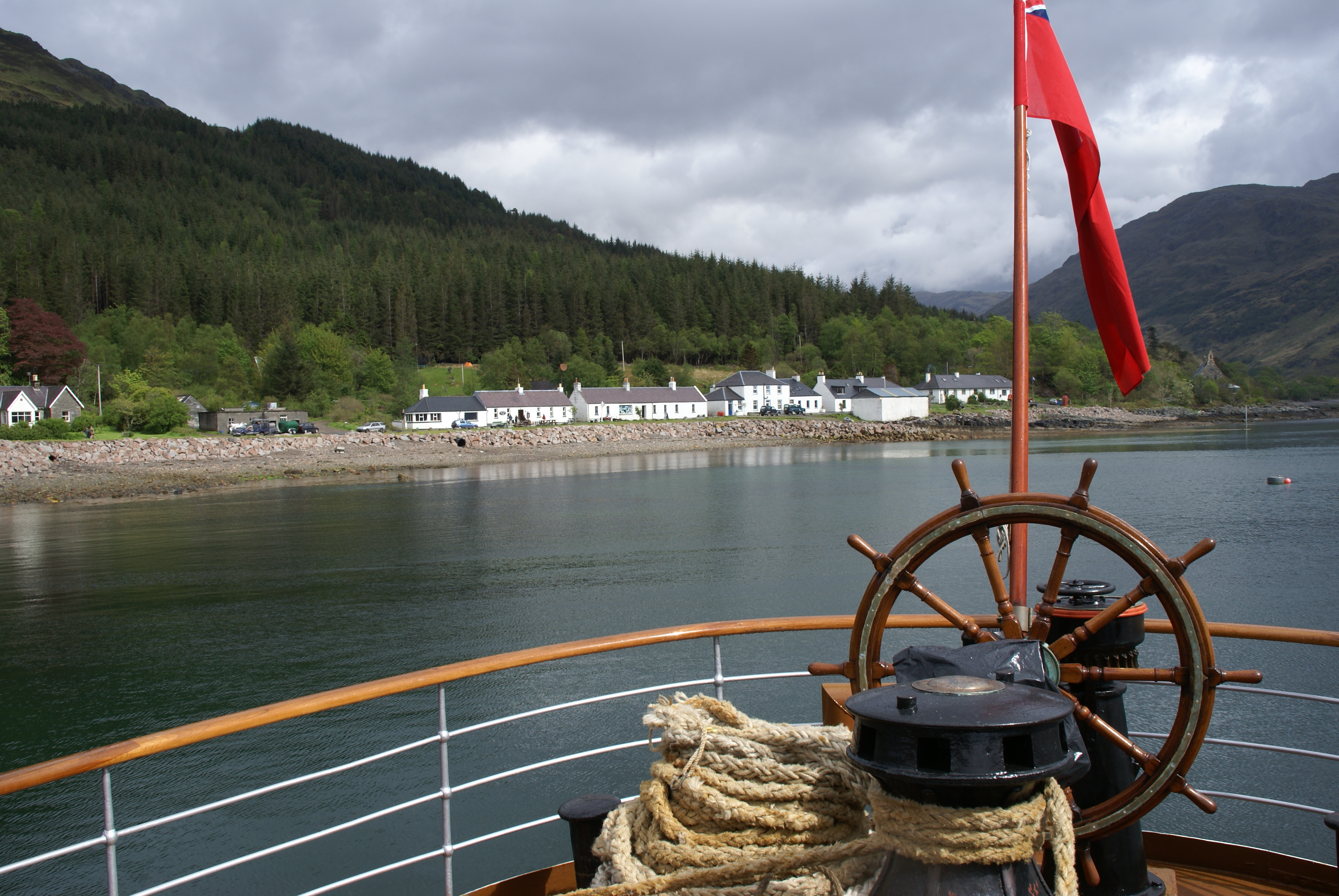
Inverie from P.S. Waverley

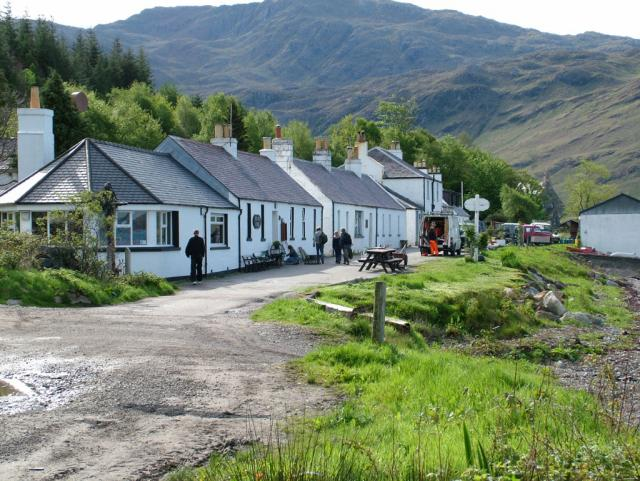
Inverie from the road

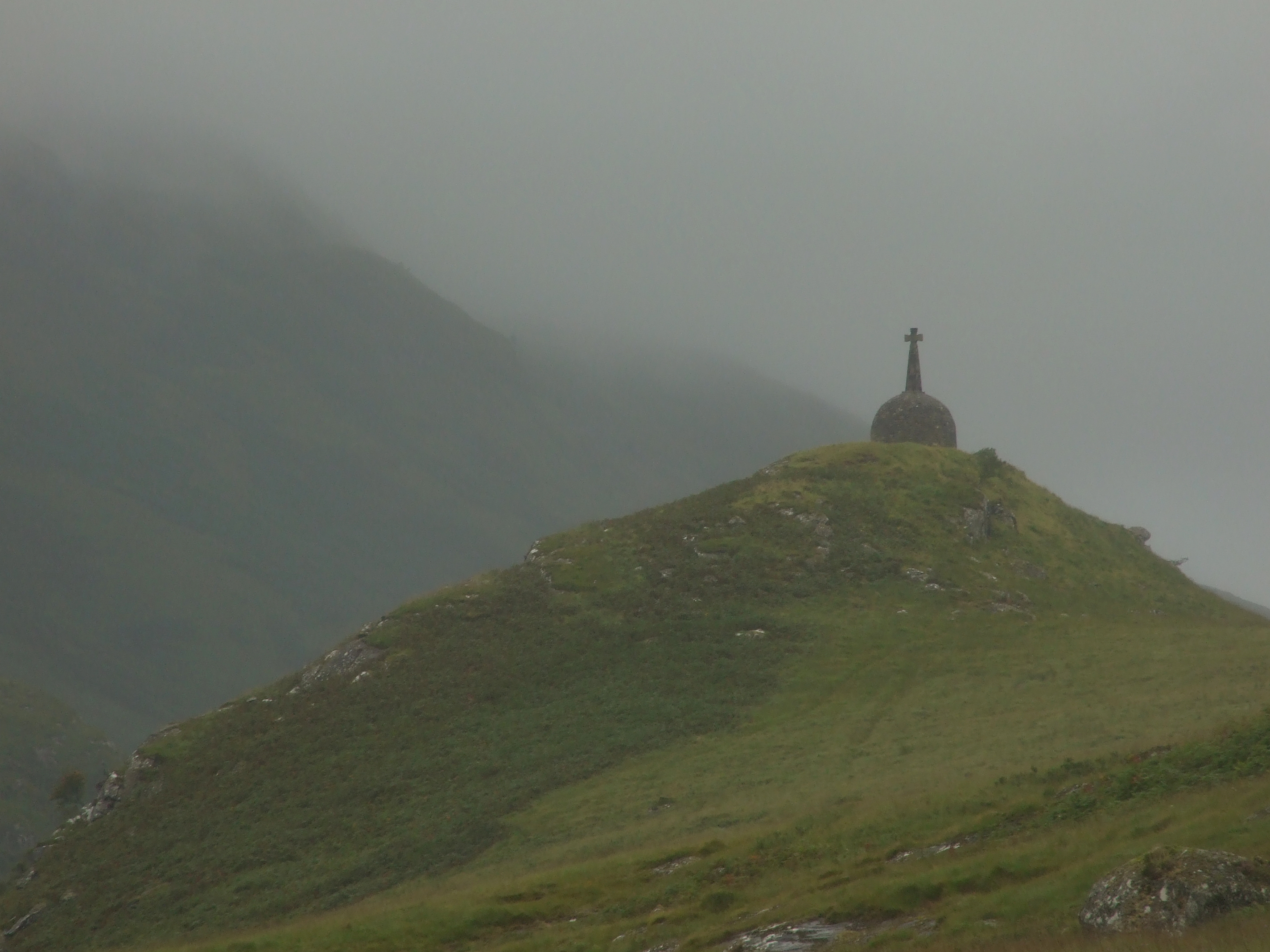
The Brockett Monument

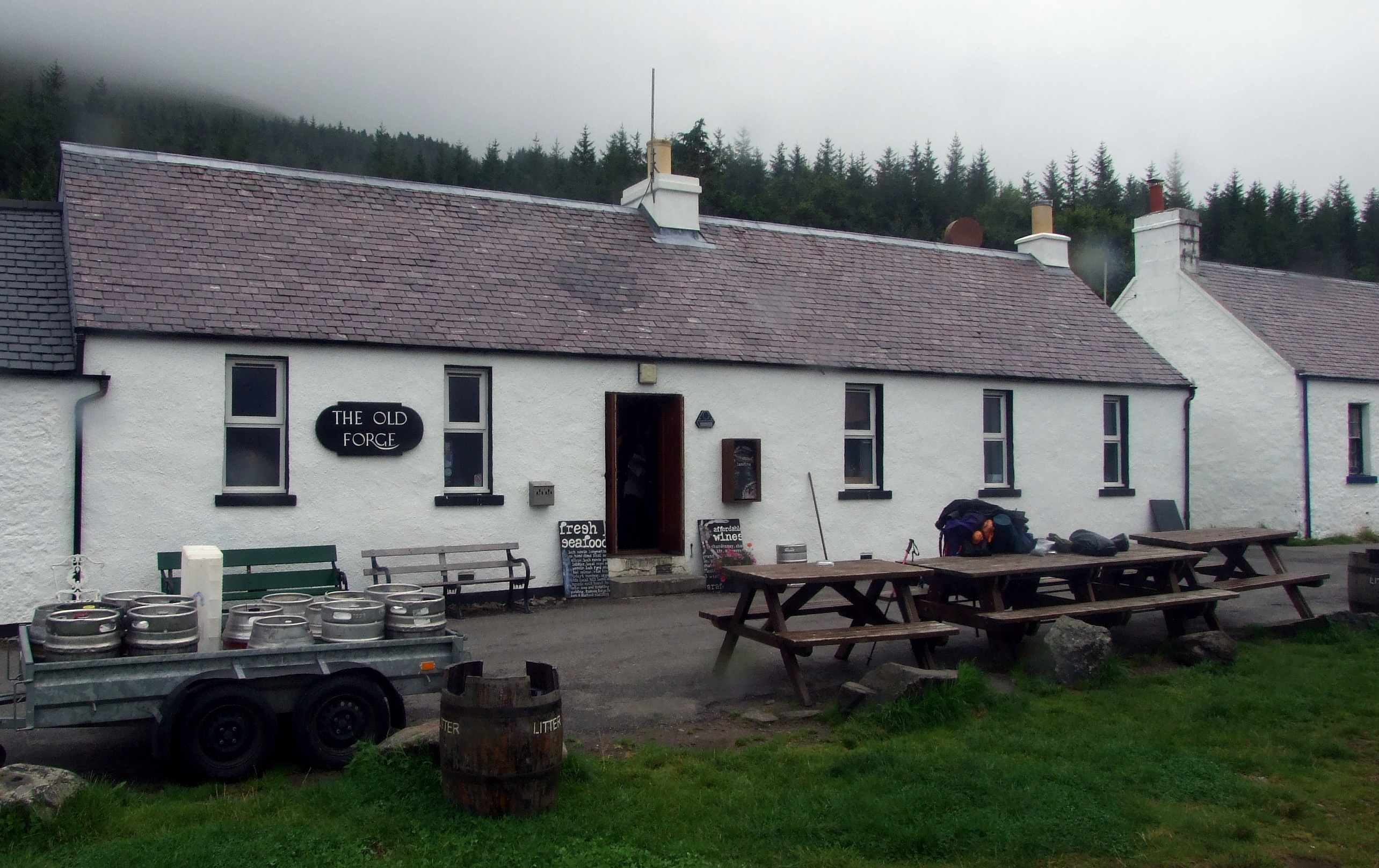
The Old Forge pub, 2008

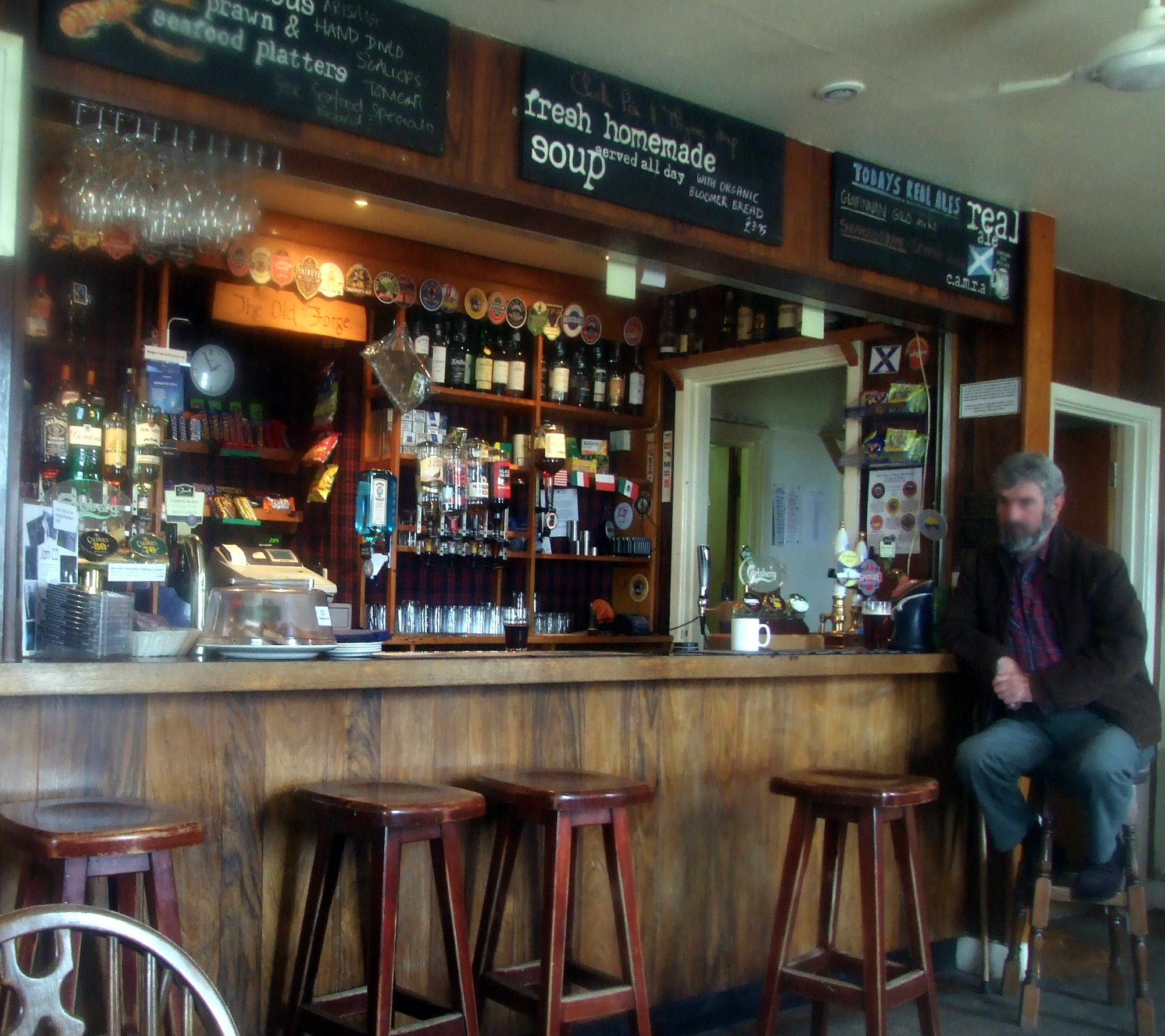
The Old Forge bar in 2008
