= Loch Hourn =

Sea loch on the west coast of Scotland

Coordinates: 57°7′30″N 5°35′37″W

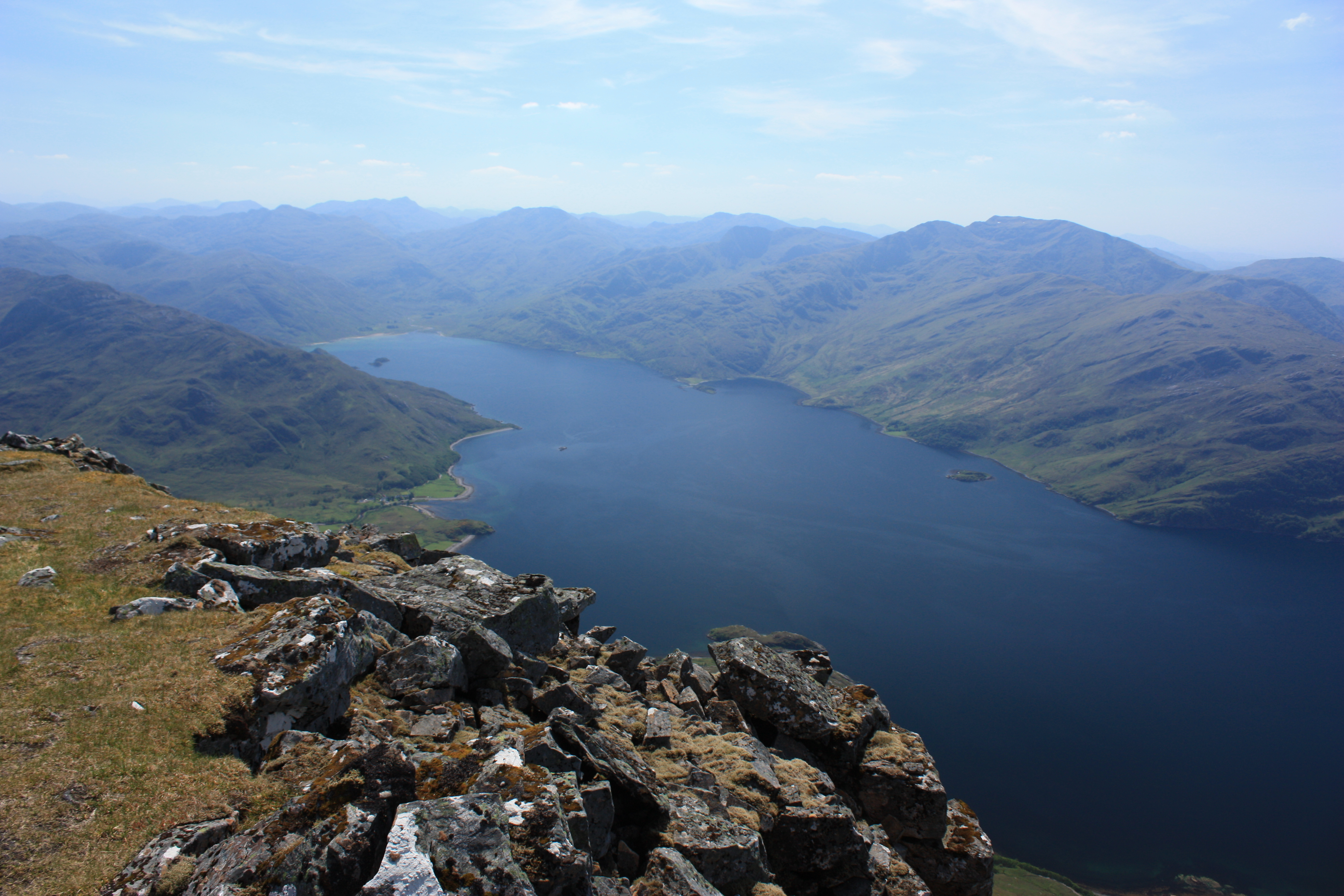
Loch Hourn seen from the summit of Beinn Sgritheall

Loch Hourn (Scottish Gaelic: Loch Shubhairne) is a sea loch which separates the peninsulas of Glenelg to the north and Knoydart to the south, on the west coast of Scotland.

== Geography ==
Loch Hourn runs inland from the Sound of Sleat, opposite the island of Skye, for 22 km (c. 14 miles) to the head of the loch at Kinloch Hourn. At the entrance, its confluence with the Sound of Sleat, it is 5 km (3 miles) wide, becoming less than 2 km wide for much of its length, with successive narrows in the upper reaches and reducing to a 300-metre-wide basin at the head.

Sometimes described as the most fjord-like of the sea lochs of northwest Scotland, it is steep-sided, with Beinn Sgritheall to the north and Ladhar Bheinn rising from the southern shore. The sea floor has been shaped by glaciation into five progressively deeper basins with relatively shallow sills; combined with the narrow and sheltered aspect of the loch and the high local rainfall, these result in an unusually wide variation of salinity and sea habitats over the length of the loch.

The loch is navigable by ships as far as Barisdale Bay. Small boats can reach Kinloch Hourn, but these upper reaches are dependent on tide and subject to strong currents. All of the loch is subject to fierce and erratic winds. There is no road access to most of the shoreline. Apart from a few isolated cottages, the only community is Arnisdale, with a population of around 30. Kinloch Hourn is 36 km (22 miles) on single track road from the A87 near Invergarry.

Local economy is small scale. There is a fish farm near the mouth of the loch; a few local shell fishing boats; a few jobs dependent on the surrounding shooting estates and some local income from tourism.

A small passenger ferry/excursion boat which ran from Arnisdale to other parts of the loch, and provided access to the north shores of Knoydart, ceased business in 2011.
