= Beinn Loinne =

Mountain in Highland, Scotland

Coordinates: 57.122035°N 5.089277°W

- Druim nan Cnamh
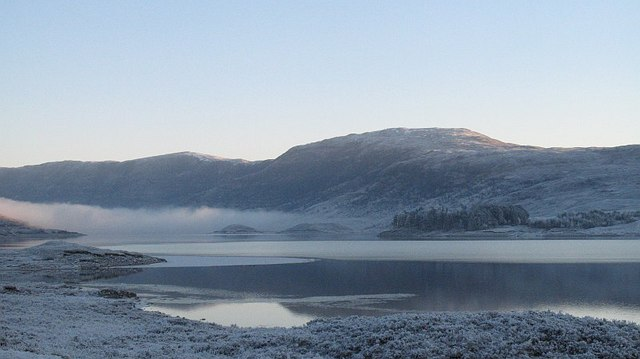
- Beinn Loinne from the shore of Loch Cluanie

Highest point
- Elevation: 789 m (2,589 ft)
- Prominence: 354 m (1,161 ft)
- Listing: Corbett, Marilyn

Geography
- Location: Inverness-shire, Scotland
- Parent range: Northwest Highlands
- OS grid: NH131077
- Topo map: OS Landranger 34

Beinn Loinne (also known as Druim nan Cnamh) (789 m) is a mountain in the Northwest Highlands of Scotland. It rises above the southern shore of Loch Cluanie in Inverness-shire.

The mountain takes the form of a long ridge, and although a familiar sight from the A87 road between Kintail and Glen Moriston it is still a remote peak. The nearest village is Dalchreichart to the east.
