= Am Bàthach =

Scottish mountain

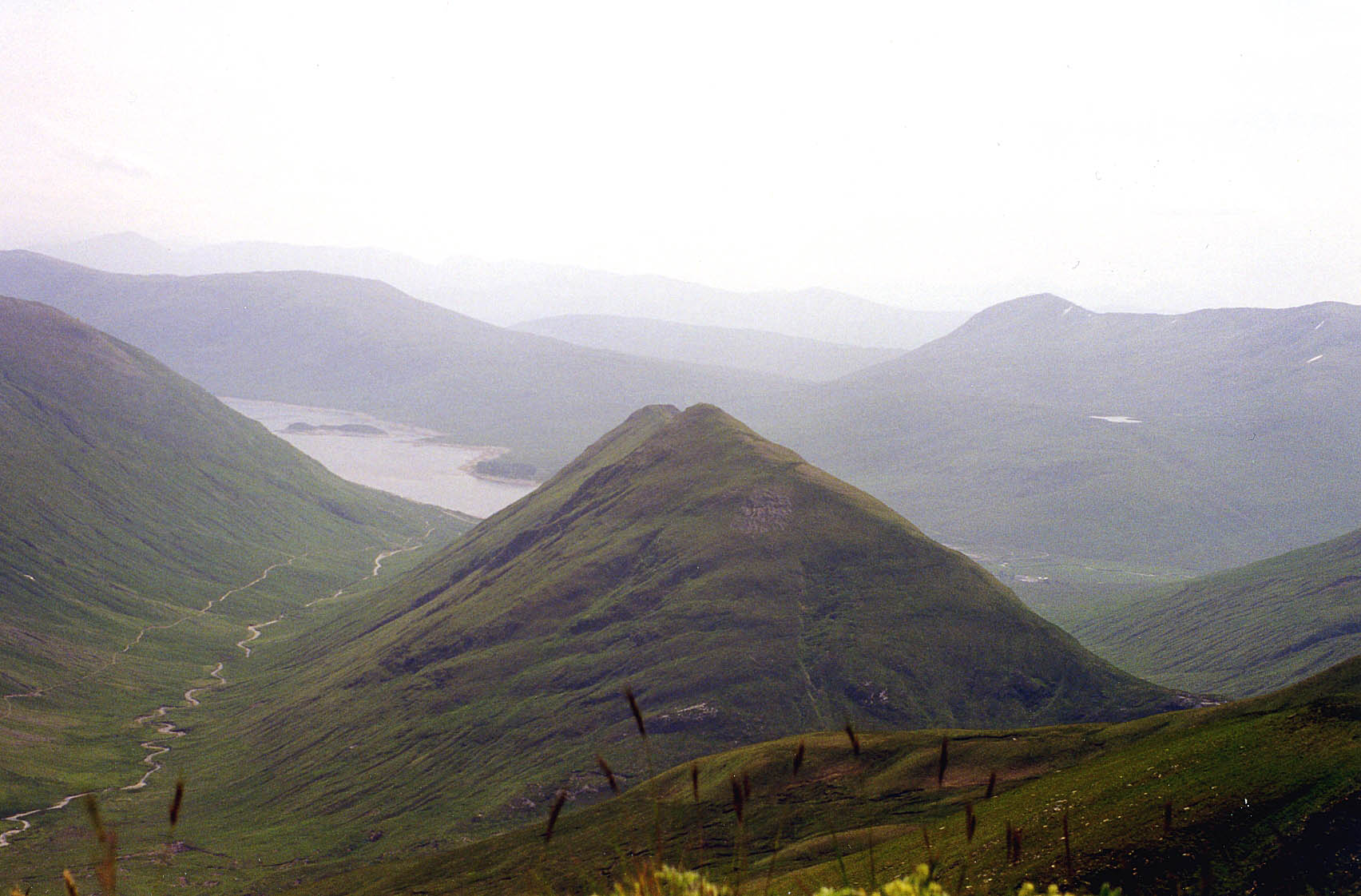
- Am Bàthach seen from Ciste Dhubh, 2.5 km (1.5 miles) to the north.

Highest point
- Elevation: 798 m (2,618 ft)
- Prominence: 231 m (758 ft)
- Listing: Corbett, Marilyn
- Coordinates: 57°10′44″N 5°11′20″W

Naming
- English translation: The Byre
- Language of name: Gaelic
- Pronunciation: Scottish Gaelic: [əm ˈpaːhax]

Geography
- Location within Scotland
- Location: Kintail, Highland, Scotland
- Parent range: Northwest Highlands
- OS grid: NH073143
- Topo map: OS Landranger 33, OS Explorer 414

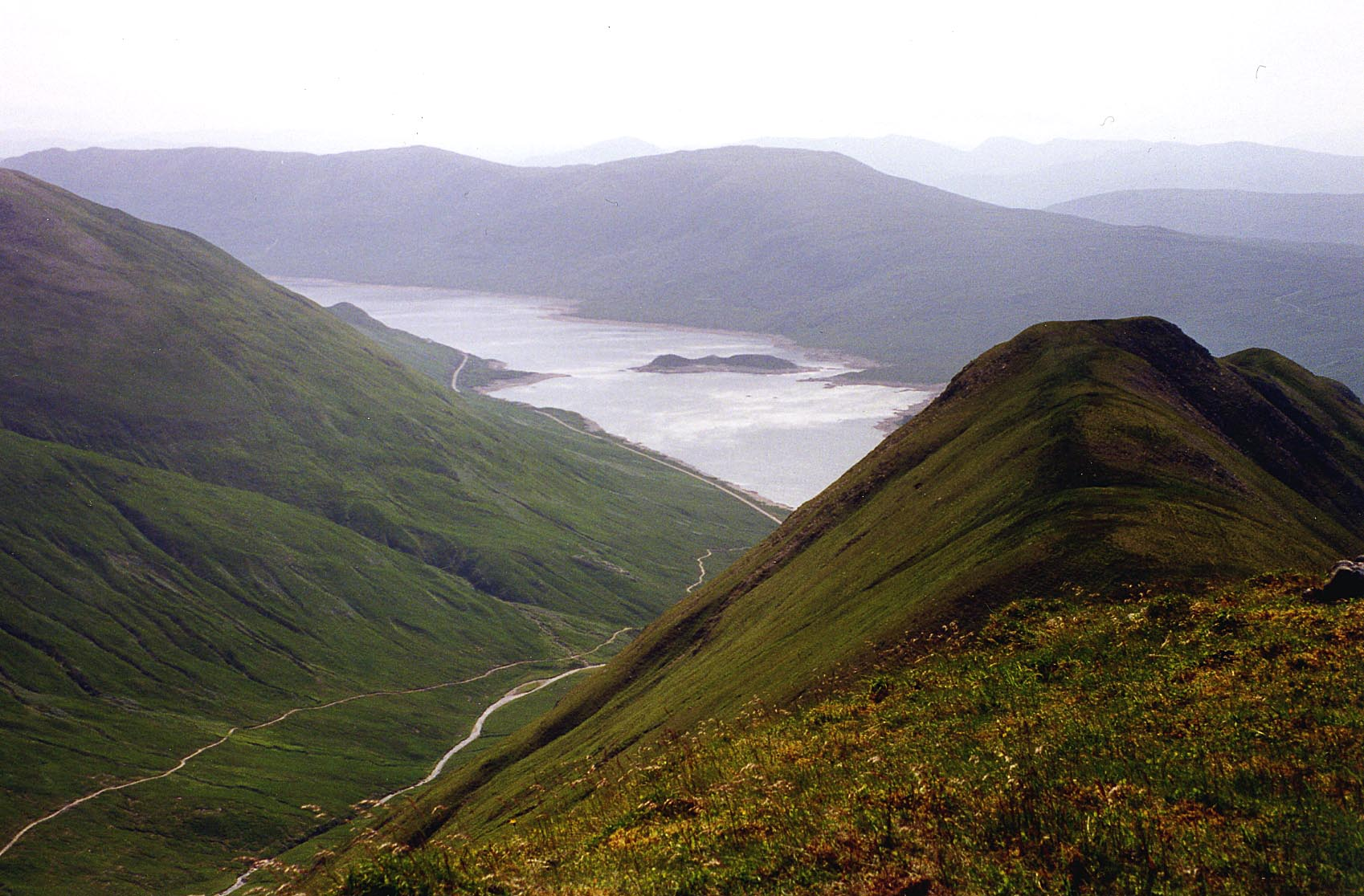
Looking south from the highest point along the summit ridge. Loch Cluanie lies beyond and the An Caorann Mor glen is on the left hand side.

Am Bàthach is a Scottish mountain situated at the head of Glen Shiel, at the western end of Loch Cluanie some 38 km (24 mi) south east of Kyle of Lochalsh.

== Overview ==
Am Bàthach reaches a height of 798 metres (2,618 feet) and is a lone Corbett surrounded by considerably higher Munros. Its grassy slopes are in marked contrast to the rockier peaks of the other Glen Shiel hills. it is often climbed along with the adjoining Munro of Ciste Dhubh with the route over Am Bàthach providing a more interesting and drier route to the Munro than the boggy An Caorann Beag glen. The hill offers an interesting half day walk when ascended on its own and it is frequently the only one of the Kintail mountains in the clear when weather conditions are poor. Am Bàthach's roof like shape made up of a long NE-SW ridge with steep sides is alleged to resemble a cow shed or a byre and that is the meaning of its translated name, a throwback to the time when cattle where a prominent feature of the Scottish Highlands.

== Geography ==
Am Bàthach's summit ridge is roughly 1 km (3,300 ft) in length with the highest point lying at the northern extremity, and the southern end of the ridge having a spot height of 734 metres (2,408 ft). There is a col with a height of 705 metres (2,313 ft) at the midpoint in between the two high points. The steep slopes on either side of the mountain drop down to the valleys of the An Caorann Beag on its west side and the An Caorann Mòr on the eastern flanks, both these hillsides are seamed with numerous small streams. The southern ridge of Am Bàthach descends to the A87 road as it passes along the northern shore of Loch Cluanie and has been planted with coniferous woodland on its lower slopes, this plantation is an outlying eastern section of the Glenshiel Forest.

The hills northern flank descends by a NW ridge down to the Bealach a’ Chòinich (Pass of the Bog) with a height of 591 metres (1,939 ft). The pass, which lives up to its name connects to the two Munros of Ciste Dhubh and Aonach Meadhoin and has a small lochan lying on it. Am Bàthach is drained by the Allt a’ Chaorainn Bhig and the Allt a’ Chaorainn Mhòir, the two burns which flow down the glens to the east and west of the hill. They flow to Loch Cluanie and reach the east coast of Scotland at the Moray Firth, some 70 km (43 mi) distant, via Glenmoriston and Loch Ness.

== Ascents ==
There is really only one route of ascent for Am Bàthach, this is the climb from the A87 road to the south. The only alternative is passing over the hill when descending from the Munro of Ciste Dhubh. The route from the A87 starts at the car park next to the Cluanie Inn (grid reference NH075117). From here the southern ridge of Am Bàthach can be accessed by walking east for 1.5 km (0.93 mi) along the A87 and then following an old stalkers path which leaves the road and goes to the right of the plantation to climb the southern ridge of the mountain to the summit. The summit is a good place to admire the surrounding Munros of Kintail. Loch Cluanie is well seen to the south and the Cluanie Inn is in view at its west end.
