= A850 road =

Road in the Scottish Isles

A850

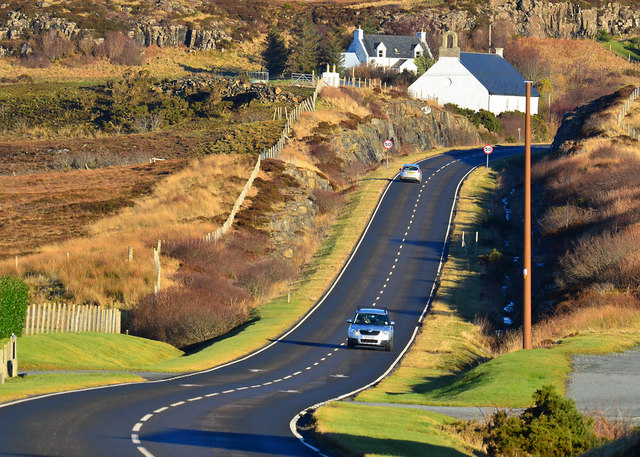
- The A850 approaching Flashader

Major junctions
- From: Dunvegan Castle; 57.4367°N 6.5814°W
- A863; A87
- To: Borve; 57.4512°N 6.2629°W

Location
- Country: United Kingdom
- Constituent country: Scotland

Road network
- Roads in the United Kingdom; Motorways; A and B road zones
← A849	→ A851

The A850 road is a road on the Isle of Skye in the Scottish Isles, off the west coast of mainland Scotland.

== Route ==
The road connects Dunvegan Castle and the town of Dunvegan and the north of the island with the A87 road for Portree that then crosses to the mainland road system. The more direct road connecting Dunvegan with the A87 is the A863. The Fairy Bridge, which carries the road to the Waternish peninsula. lies slightly north of the road, to the west of Upperglen.

== Settlements on or near the A850 ==
West to East

- Upperglen
- Edinbane
- Flashader
- Treaslane
- Bernisdale
- Skeabost
- Crepkill
- Carbost
- Borve
