= Tomchrasky =

Coordinates: 57.16832°N 4.87192°W

Tomchrasky: Scottish Gaelic: Tom Chrasgaidh
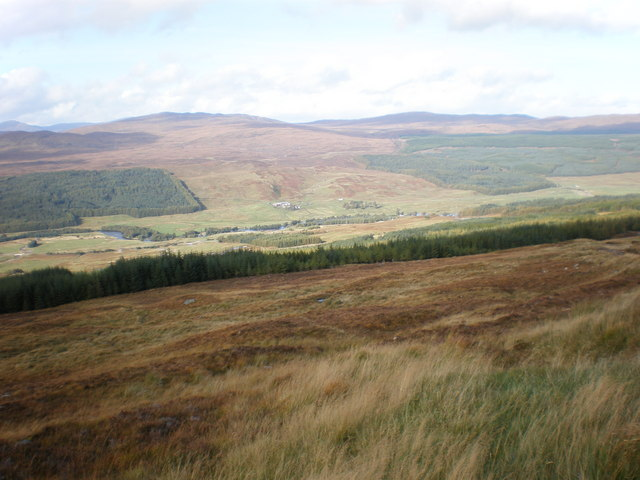
- Tomchrasky Glen Moriston from above Coire an Eòin track

- Location within the Inverness area
- OS grid reference: NH263124
- Council area: Highland
- Country: Scotland
- Sovereign state: United Kingdom
- Postcode district: IV63 7
- Police: Scotland
- Fire: Scottish
- Ambulance: Scottish

Tomchrasky is a village in Glen Moriston, in Inverness-shire, Scottish Highlands and is in the Scottish council area of Highland. The village lies on the north banks of the River Moriston. The village of Dalchreichart lies 2 miles (3 kilometres) to the east of Tomchrasky.
