= A863 road =

Road in Scotland

Coordinates: 57.34683°N 6.38589°W

A863

Major junctions
- From: Dunvegan
- A87 A850
- To: Sligachan

Location
- Country: United Kingdom
- Constituent country: Scotland

Road network
- Roads in the United Kingdom; Motorways; A and B road zones

The A863 road is one of the principal roads of the Isle of Skye in the Inner Hebrides off the west coast of mainland Scotland.

It connects the town of Dunvegan and the north west of the island with the A87 that then crosses the Skye Bridge for access to the mainland road system. The A863 is some 23 miles (37 km) in length.

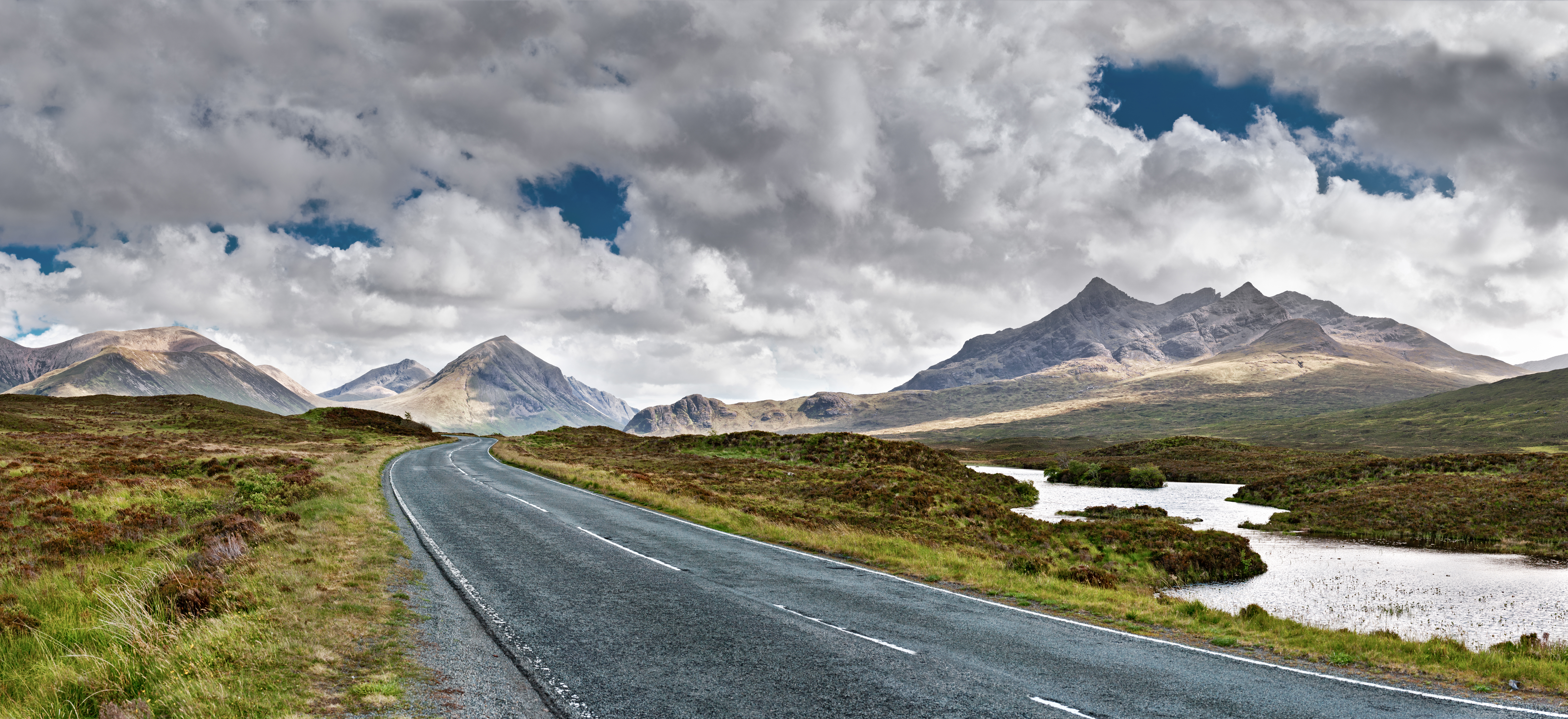
Views of the Cuillin Mountains on the A863 towards Sligachan on the Isle of Skye, Scotland.

== Settlements on or near the A863 ==
North to South

- Dunvegan – junction with the A850 road
- Lonmore
- Roskhill
- Ose
- Struan
- Bracadale
- Coillore
- Drynoch
- Sligachan– junction with the A87
