= River Moriston =

River and power stations in Scotland

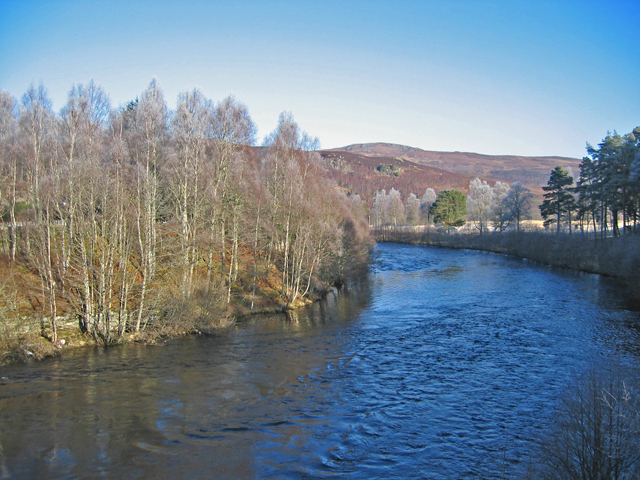
- The River Moriston looking downstream from Torgyle Bridge

- Location of the mouth within Scottish Highlands

Location
- Country: Scotland

Physical characteristics
- Source
  - location: Loch Cluanie
  - coordinates: 57.1430°N 5.0016°W
- Mouth
  - location: Loch Ness
  - coordinates: 57.2096°N 4.6033°W

The River Moriston (Scottish Gaelic: Abhainn Mhoireastain) is a river in Inverness-shire, Scotland. It flows broadly east-north-east from the outfall of the dam at Loch Cluanie to Loch Ness. Its waters and those of its tributaries have been harnessed to generate hydro-electric power.

== Route ==
The River Moriston begins just below the dam at the eastern end of Loch Cluanie. Flow in the river is maintained by releasing compensation water from the loch. The A887 road from Kyle of Lochalsh to Loch Ness closely follows the course of the river for much of its length, and is on the north bank at this point. A small river, the Allt nam Peathrain, flows southwards to pass under the road and join the channel on its left bank. At Bun Loyne, a bridge carries the A87 road over the river, as it heads southwards to Glen Garry and the River Garry. Below the bridge, the River Loyne joins on the right bank. This is largely compensation water released from the dam at the eastern end of Loch Loyne. The A887 road crosses to the south bank at Ceannacroc Bridge. The road formerly crossed the old bridge, constructed by Thomas Telford in 1808-1811, and located a little further downstream. It consists of a main span of 50 feet (15 m) for the river and a flood arch of 36 feet (11 m).

The river sweeps round in a large bend, where it is joined by the waters of the River Doe and its tributary the Allt Bhuruisgidh, both of which are dammed further upstream. The main channel continues in an east-north-easterly direction, past the hamlet of Tomchrasky on its northern bank. There is a hatchery on the right bank, and then the A887 crosses to the left bank at Torgoyle Bridge. A bridge was constructed here in 1811 by Telford, but in 1818 was destroyed by a flood. A temporary wooden bridge was put in place to maintain the route, and the present three-arched structure was completed in 1823, to the design of Joseph Mitchell, who was Telford's principal inspector. The outside two arches span 48 feet (15 m) while the centre one, which is wider and higher, spans 55 feet (17 m). The is extensive forest on both banks of the river, which gradually widens as it becomes part of Dundreggan Reservoir. A dam impounds the water at its eastern end, and a hydro-electric power station is located on the south bank close to the dam.

The river narrows again, as it is fed with compensation water from the dam, and is joined by Allt Bhlaraidh, flowing southwards from three lochs and a reservoir, all of which are dammed. The river finally turns towards the south-east as it approached Invermoriston, the main settlement on its course. The A82 road which runs along the bank of Loch Ness used to cross the river on a two-arched bridge, with another arch on the right bank of the river and a three-arched clapper bridge in the approach on the left bank. It is in line with Telford's road built for the Commission for Highland Roads and Bridges in 1808-1811, but is thought to date from the mid-18th century. A replacement bridge was built in 1933, slightly further downstream. It consists of a single 90-foot (27 m) concrete span with a small flood arch, and was designed by Mears and Carcus-Wilson. Below the newer bridge is a nine-sided gazebo, perched on a rocky outcrop overlooking the river. It dates from the early 19th century. Shortly afterwards, the river discharges into Loch Ness.

== Hydro-electric power ==
The Garry-Moriston hydro-electric scheme was one of several constructed by the North of Scotland Hydro-Electric Board, a public body formed in 1943 to promote water power in the Highlands. They used profits from similar schemes in the southern Highlands to fund remote schemes such as this, in order to stimulate economic regeneration of the area. The catchment for the River Moriston, which includes Loch Loyne and Loch Cluanie, is 158 square miles (410 km^{2}). Loch Loyne is impounded by a dam, which is 1,800 feet (550 m) long and 72 feet (22 m) high. Most of the water released from the loch passes along a tunnel and into Loch Cluanie. A small amount of electricity is generated by an induction generator in the pipeline. The dam is a mass gravity dam, and construction was completed in 1956. The loch covers an area of 2.43 square miles (6.3 km^{2}), the surface level is 748 feet (228 m) above Ordnance datum (AOD), and it is relatively shallow. The Cluanie dam is also a mass gravity dam, 2,215 feet (675 m) long and 133 feet (41 m) high. Compensation water for the River Moriston flows through a small power station located at the base of the dam. Both the Loyne dam and the Cluanie dam were built using ground blast furnace slag, which replaced 70 percent of the cement which would otherwise have been used, reducing the amount of Portland cement used by 40,000 long tons (41,000 t). The project was the first time that this technique had been used in Britain. Loch Cluanie is much deeper than Loch Loyne. It covers an area of 4.04 square miles (1,046 ha) and its surface level is 705 feet (215 m) AOD, which is 96 feet (29 m) higher than it was prior to construction of the dam.

From Loch Cluanie, water is fed to a power station at Ceannacroc through a tunnel and pressure shaft. The power station was built underground and was one of the first underground stations to be constructed in the country, when it was completed in 1956. This arrangement provides a head of 300 feet (90 m) and the station can generate 20 MW. There is also a smaller generator in the station, which can discharge compensation water to the river when the full capacity of the station is not required. In addition to the main supply from Loch Cluanie, water from the upper reaches of the River Doe and its tributaries is captured and fed into a branch tunnel, where it can either be used by the turbine directly, or can be fed into Loch Cluanie for later use.

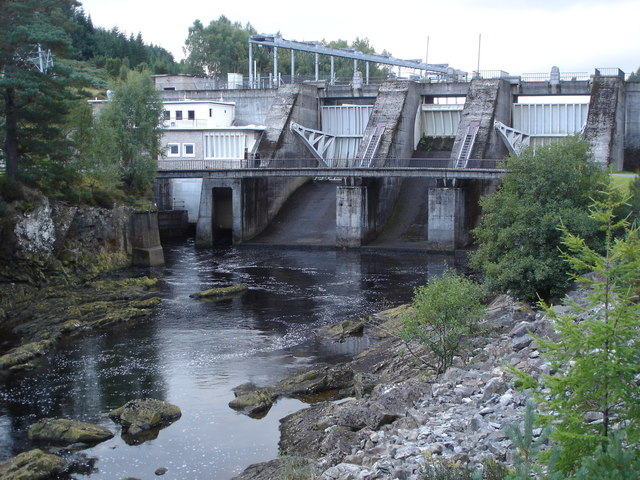
The dam at Dundreggan reservoir

A dam was built across the River Moriston some 9 miles (14 km) downstream of the Loch Cluanie dam in 1957, to form Dundreggan Reservoir. It is a mass gravity dam 460 feet (140 m) long by 59 feet (18 m) high, and creates a headpond for Glenmoriston power station which is 300 feet (91 m) below the ground, and is fed by a vertical shaft. Once the water has passed through the two 18 MW turbines, it flows into the mouth of the River Moriston through a tailrace tunnel which is 20 feet (6.1 m) in diameter and around 4 miles (6.4 km) long. The level of the reservoir is controlled by automatic sector gates. Compensation water for the river is discharged through another small power station, built into the dam. When the dam was constructed, a Borland type fish pass was included, to allow fish to move upstream beyond the structure.

A third power station on the River Moriston system was constructed in 1962. The Livishie station generates 15 MW, and a head of 850 feet (259 m) is provided by the Bhlaraidh Reservoir. This acts as a headpool, but its water is supplemented by supplies from Loch a Chrathaich, Loch Laith and Loch ma Stac, all of which have had their capacity increased by the construction of small dams. Transfer from these lochs is controlled remotely from Glenmoriston power station. In addition, a system of aqueducts collects water from streams flowing into the Moriston downstream of Dundreggan Reservoir, and feeds some of their flow into Bhlaraidh Reservoir. Power generated by the stations is fed to Auchterewe, near Fort William, by overhead transmission lines, where there is a switching station and control centre. From Auchterewe, 132 kV lines distribute the power in several directions. Those over the Corrieyarrick Pass are very exposed, reaching a height of 2,507 feet (764 m) AOD, and high frequency pulses are injected into the lines to enable faults to be located.

=== Benefits ===
The construction of the hydro-electric stations has brought some benefits to the area, which are wider than just providing electricity to remote communities. The dam at Dundreggan was built at a location where there had previously been a waterfall, which made the migration of salmon up the river impossible. However, a Borland fish pass, which works in a similar way to a navigation lock, was constructed at the site, and unlike the neighbouring River Garry, where salmon stocks have suffered serious decline, salmon have established themselves on the river, and the population is stable or increasing.

While the hydro-electric schemes were being constructed in both Glen Moriston and Glen Garry, the roads running through the glens were upgraded. The main route from Invergarry to Kyle of Lochalsh formerly ran along Glen Garry to the hamlet of Tomdoun, turned northwards to cross Loch Loyne at a narrow point near the centre of the present loch, and continued to the north-west to the Cluanie Inn, at the western end of the present Loch Cluanie. When the level of Loch Loyne was raised, the crossing point was submerged, and a new A87 road was constructed, turning northwards from the old road near the eastern end of Loch Garry, running along part of the shore of Loch Loyne, and crossing over the River Loyne beyond the eastern end of the loch, to join the A887 Invermoriston to Kyle of Lochalsh road at Bun Loyne. An original bridge became visible in 2012 due to low levels of rainfall, and corresponding low levels in the loch.

== Bibliography ==
- Jepsen, Niels; Hurst-Brown, Victoria, eds. (19 May 2020). "Report of Case Studies Demonstrating the Effects of Barrier Removal, Mitigation and Installation" (PDF). Amber International. Archived (PDF) from the original on 26 January 2022.
- NoSHEB (1982). "Garry - Moriston" (PDF). North of Scotland Hydro Electric Board. Archived (PDF) from the original on 24 August 2022.
