= Dunan =

Dunan may refer to:

- Dúnán, (also as Donatus or Donat) an 11th-century bishop of Dublin
- Dunan, Skye, a settlement in Scotland
- Dunan, the native name of the Yonaguni Island in Japan
- Dunan, the Yonaguni language
