= Achlain =

House in Glenmoriston in the Highland council area of Scotland

Coordinates: 57°10′N 4°51′W

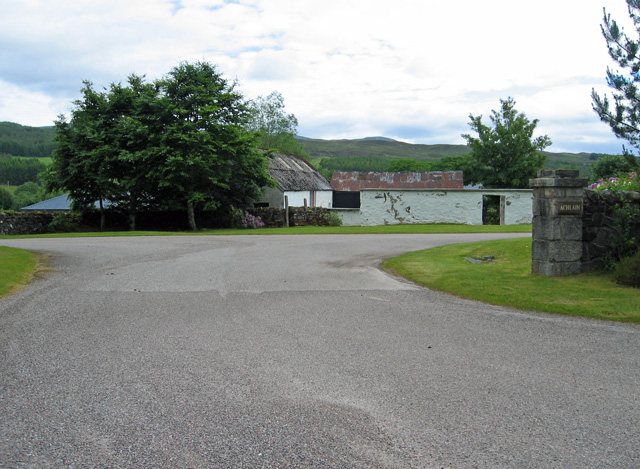
Achlain Farm buildings at the entrance to the Achlain Estate.

Achlain is a house in Glenmoriston in the Highland council area of Scotland. It is about 15 km west of Invermoriston, next to the A887 road and the River Moriston.

Achlain is on the route of a historic military road, which ran from Fort Augustus to Bernera Barracks, at Glenelg. This road was constructed in the 18th century, and ran north west over the hills from Fort Augustus, before dropping down to Glen Moriston at Achlain. Parts of the route are still visible as dirt tracks. In 1773 Dr Samuel Johnson, accompanied by James Boswell, travelled this road and stayed the night at Aonach, an Inn on Achlain ground, today no longer extant. On the next day they continued on their way to Skye.
