= Loch Loyne =

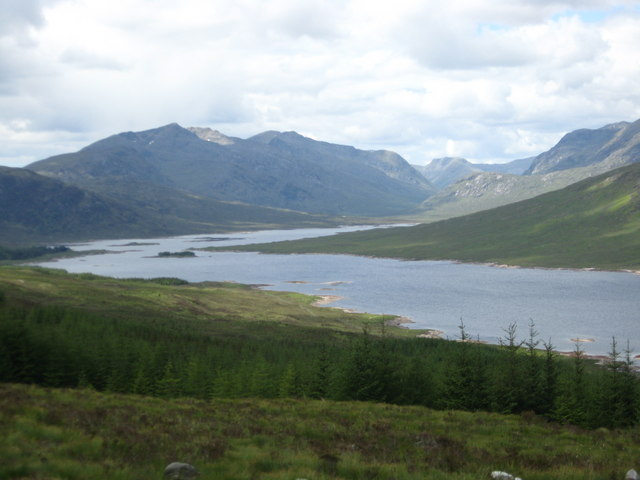
- Overlooking Loch Loyne

- Location within Highland
- Location: Northwest Highlands, Scotland
- Coordinates: 57°5′59″N 5°1′52″W
- Lake type: reservoir
- Basin countries: United Kingdom

Loch Loyne is a loch in the Northwest Highlands of Scotland. Loch Loyne lies between Glen Garry and Glen Cluanie. The A87 road runs beside the eastern side of the loch.

== Road and Dam ==
The first proper road across the Loyne was begun in 1821 by the engineer Thomas Telford as part of the later stage of military road building. The road connected Tomdoun and Inchlaggan near the River Garry with the road and inn at Loch Cluanie to the north. The road ran across the Loyne over a stone arch bridge. Much of the original road survives either side of the loch, although the bridge across the river along with a segment of the road was flooded with the building of the dam. Occasionally the bridge has been visible when water levels are low in the loch.

Prior to the 1950s, the loch was originally much smaller being fed only by the naturally occurring River Loyne. However, as part of a wider hydroelectric scheme, a dam was constructed in 1956 and completed in 1957 that increased the water level and flooded the original road built by Thomas Telford. A newer road, the current A87 was built higher up. The loch is visible to traffic on the road above. Water proceeds north from the dam via a tunnel into Loch Cluanie.
