= Flashader =

Coordinates: 57.4947°N 6.41181°W

Flashader: Scottish Gaelic: Flaiseader
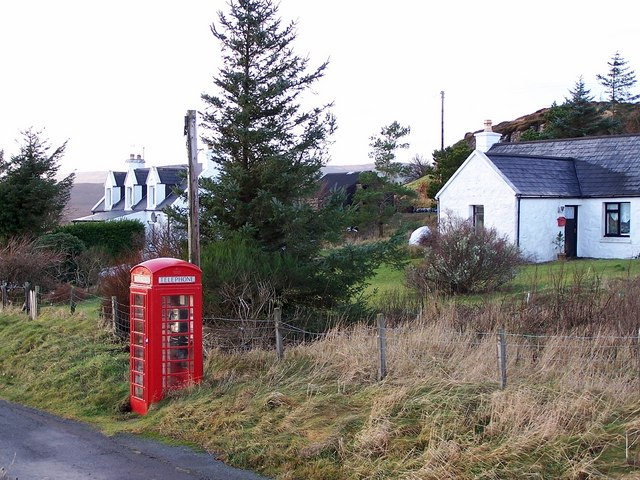
- Flashader

- Location within the Isle of Skye
- OS grid reference: NG357535
- Council area: Highland
- Country: Scotland
- Sovereign state: United Kingdom
- Post town: Portree
- Postcode district: IV51 9
- Police: Scotland
- Fire: Scottish
- Ambulance: Scottish

Flashader (Scottish Gaelic: Flaiseader) is a small crofting township close to the east coast of the sea loch Loch Greshornish on the Isle of Skye. It is in the Scottish council area of Highland. The broch, Dun Flashader, lies north of the main settlement close to the shore and beyond this is the area of Kildonan, which has a small jetty.

The village of Edinbane is located south west along the A850 road.
