= Luib, Skye =

Coordinates: 57.2773°N 6.043°W

Luib: Scottish Gaelic: Lùib
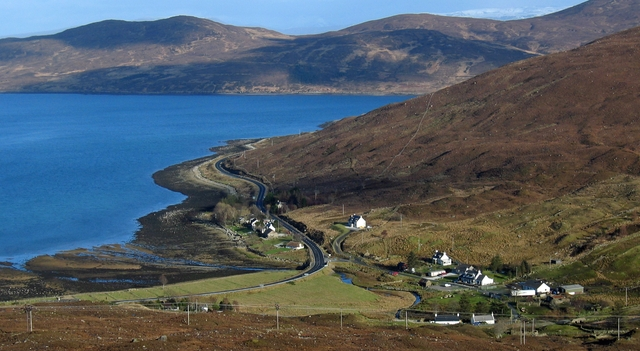
- The settlement of Luib seen from a descent of Glas Bheinn Mhor. Blue sky and blue seas on a brilliant February day.

- Location within the Isle of Skye
- OS grid reference: NG564279
- Council area: Highland
- Country: Scotland
- Sovereign state: United Kingdom
- Postcode district: IV49 9
- Police: Scotland
- Fire: Scottish
- Ambulance: Scottish

Luib (Scottish Gaelic: Lùib) is a crofting and fishing settlement on the south east shore of the sea loch, Loch Ainort near Broadford, on the island of Skye in Scotland. It is in the council area of Highland.The settlement of Dunan is 1 mile (1.5 kilometres) directly east of Luib, along the A87 coast road.

The Game of Luib was founded in the town of Luib, Scotland, in 1987 by Richard Calland, Martin Cook, Martin Curlew & Andrew Feeley (“The Founding Fathers of the Game of Luib”).

== Gallery ==
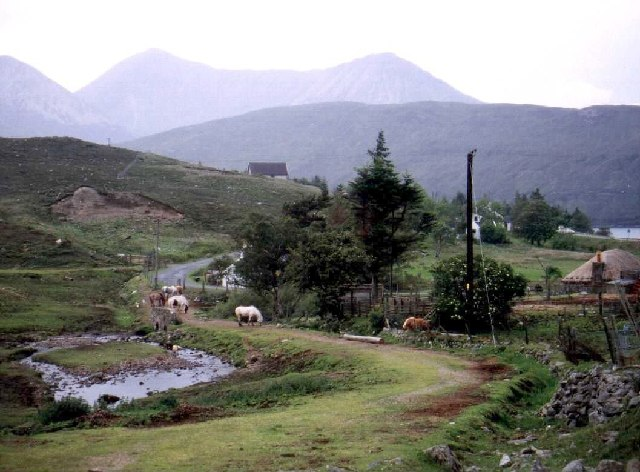

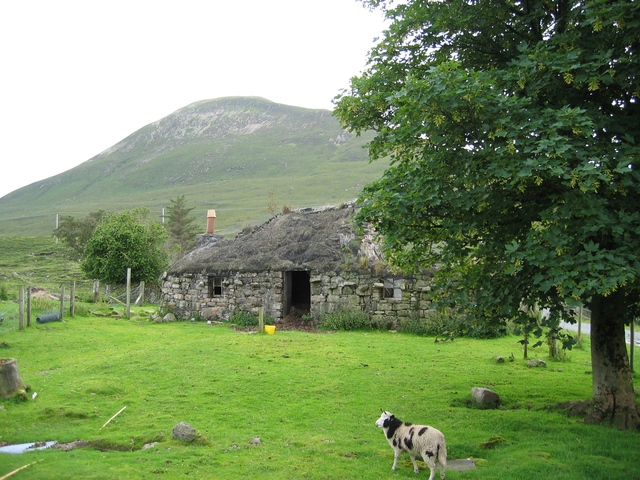
Luib folk museum

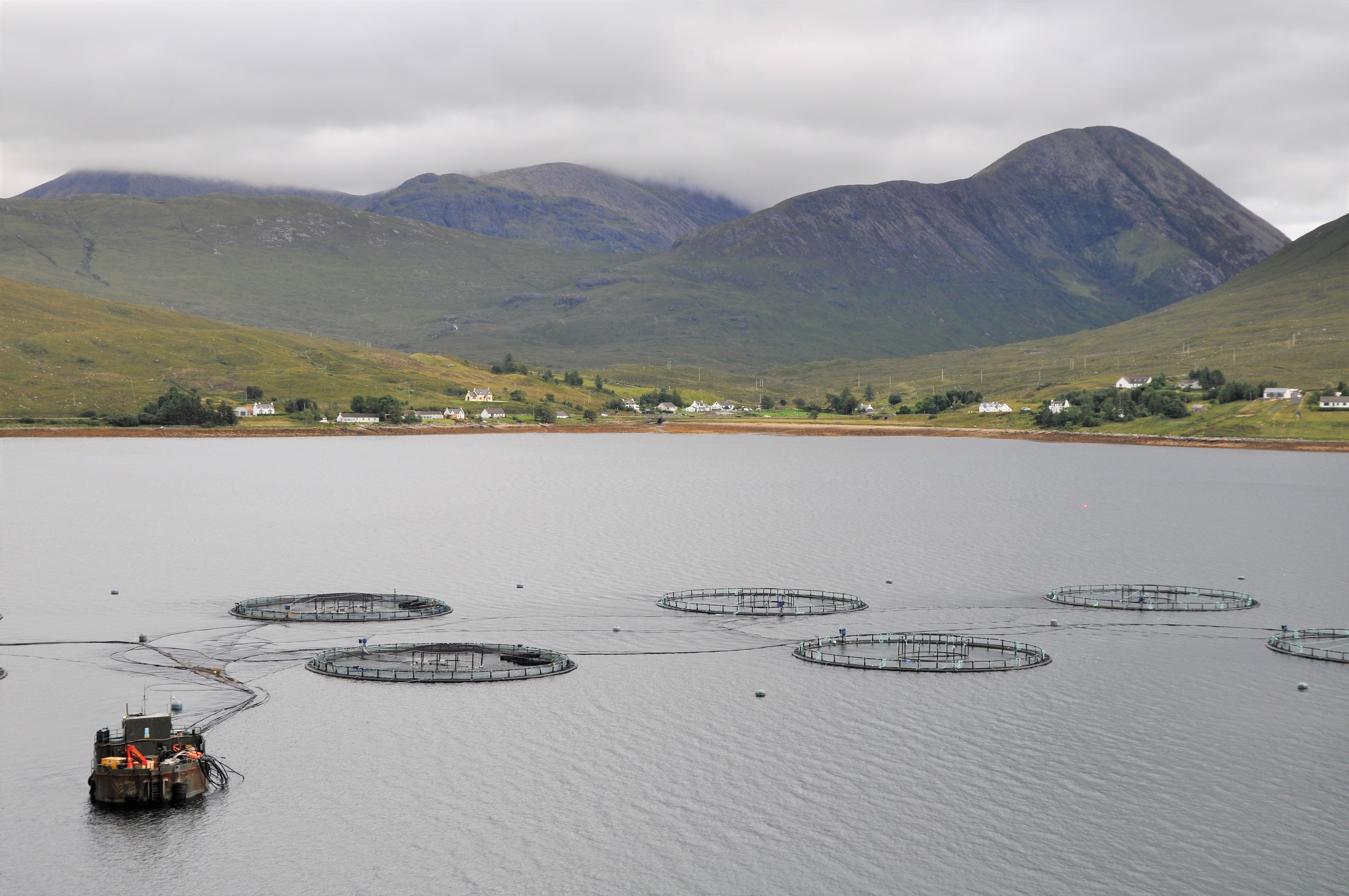
Luib seen from across Loch Ainort
