= Roderick Mackenzie (Jacobite) =

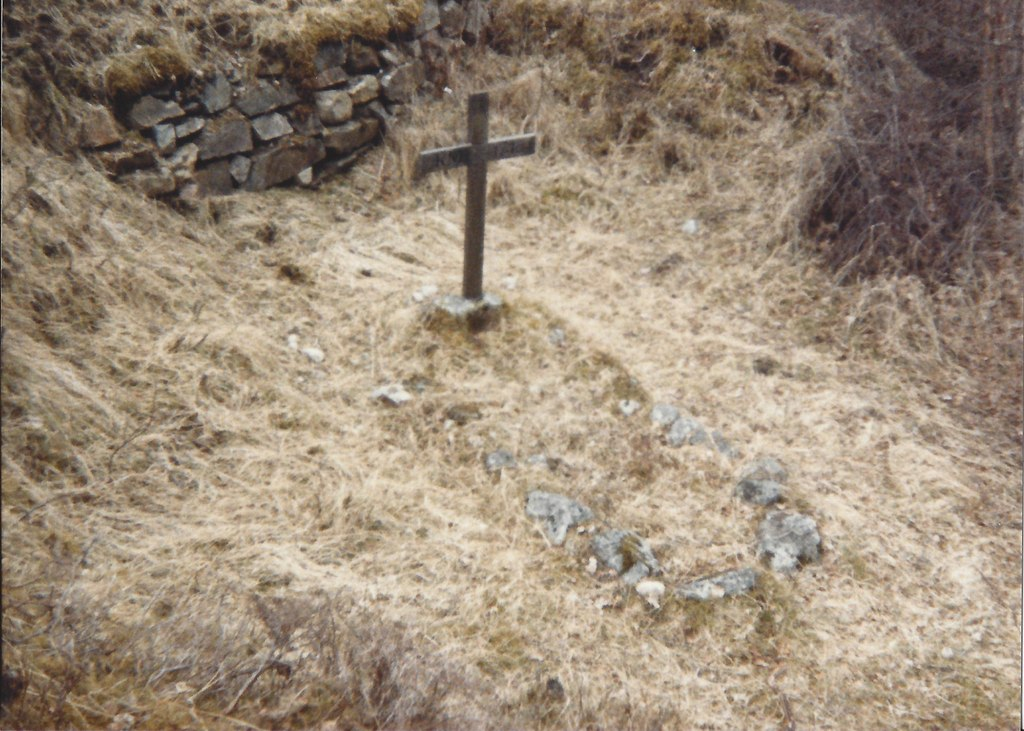
Roderick Mackenzie's grave in Glenmoriston

Roderick Mackenzie was a Jacobite soldier who was killed during the tumultuous aftermath of the Jacobite rising of 1745 while acting as a body double for the Jacobite leader Charles Edward Stuart, also known as Bonnie Prince Charlie, in July 1746.

== Early life ==
Roderick Mackenzie was the son of an Edinburgh tradesman, possibly a jeweller and goldsmith, named Colin Mackenzie. Initially, Roderick followed his father's trade and became an apprentice jeweller but then moved on to be a merchant at Fisherrow. However, he continued to follow his father's view on politics having been told many stories about the Jacobite rising of 1715 by him and so became a passionate Jacobite.

== Jacobite rising of 1745 ==
Roderick's father had died before Bonnie Prince Charlie had arrived in 1745 but when the Prince reached Edinburgh on August 8, 1745, Roderick joined his Jacobite army. Roderick joined David Wemyss, Lord Elcho's Troop of the Prince's Life Guards. It was soon noticed that he looked very similar to the Prince and could therefore act as his body double. Roderick fought at the Battle of Culloden on April 16, 1746, where the Jacobites were defeated and where he helped to defend the retreating Jacobites. He then became a fugitive of the law and could not return to his mother and sisters in Edinburgh as this would have put them in danger.

=== Death in Glenmoriston ===
In late July 1746, the British Army had received information that Bonnie Prince Charlie was hiding in Glenmoriston and Roderick Mackenzie was also in Glenmoriston. A British Army patrol spotted Roderick and because of his likeness to Prince Charlie, thought that they had found the Prince. There was a £30,000 bounty to capture the Prince dead or alive. Roderick, surrounded by the soldiers, drew his sword and refused to surrender. The soldiers opened fire and he was riddled with a volley of musket bullets. His death gave Prince Charlie time to escape from the glen and the search for him was reduced. Roderick Mackenzie's dying words were:

"You have killed your Prince!"

== Aftermath ==
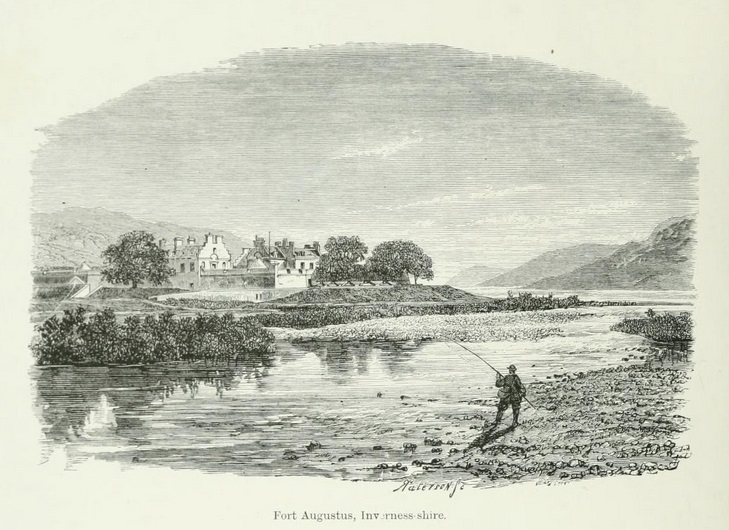
Fort Augustus

The soldiers cut off Roderick's head and took it to Fort Augustus hoping to receive their reward and where Prince William, Duke of Cumberland was staying. The captured Jacobite, MacDonald of Kingsburgh, who was also the future father-in-law of Flora MacDonald, was asked to identify the head as being the Prince's but he was not able to. Cumberland then took the head to London for other Jacobite prisoners to identify but by this time it had begun to decompose and it was decided that it was not the Prince.

== Grave and cairn ==
In Glenmoriston, both Roderick's grave and a cairn erected in memory of him can be seen where every year in late July a small ceremony is held by the 1745 Association and the Clan Mackenzie Society. The cairn may have been there since Mackenzie's death in 1746 but has had many stones added to it by tourists over the years. Major repairs were made to the cairn in the mid-1950s after an American tourist of Mackenzie descent wrote to the National Trust and a programme was set up for its repair. Permission was subsequently gained from the Forestry Commission who held overall responsibility for the cairn. On Roderick Mackenzie's grave there is a cross that has been replaced by the Inverness Field Club.

The inscription on the cairn reads:

AT THIS SPOT IN 1746 DIED

RODERICK MACKENZIE AN OFFICER IN THE ARMY OF PRINCE CHARLES EDWARD STUART OF THE SAME SIZE AND SIMILAR RESEMBLANCE TO HIS ROYAL PRINCE WHEN SURPRISED AND

OVERPOWERED BY THE TROOPS OF THE DUKE OF CUMBERLAND. GALLANTLY DIED IN ATTEMPTING TO SAVE HIS FUGITIVE LEADER FROM FURTHER PURSUIT.

The stone with the inscription was apparently installed by the Reverend John Anthony Macrae some time before 1914. He was an Oxford graduate who held various charges in Dundee, Edinburgh, Glasgow, and Redgorton, and he died in October 1954.

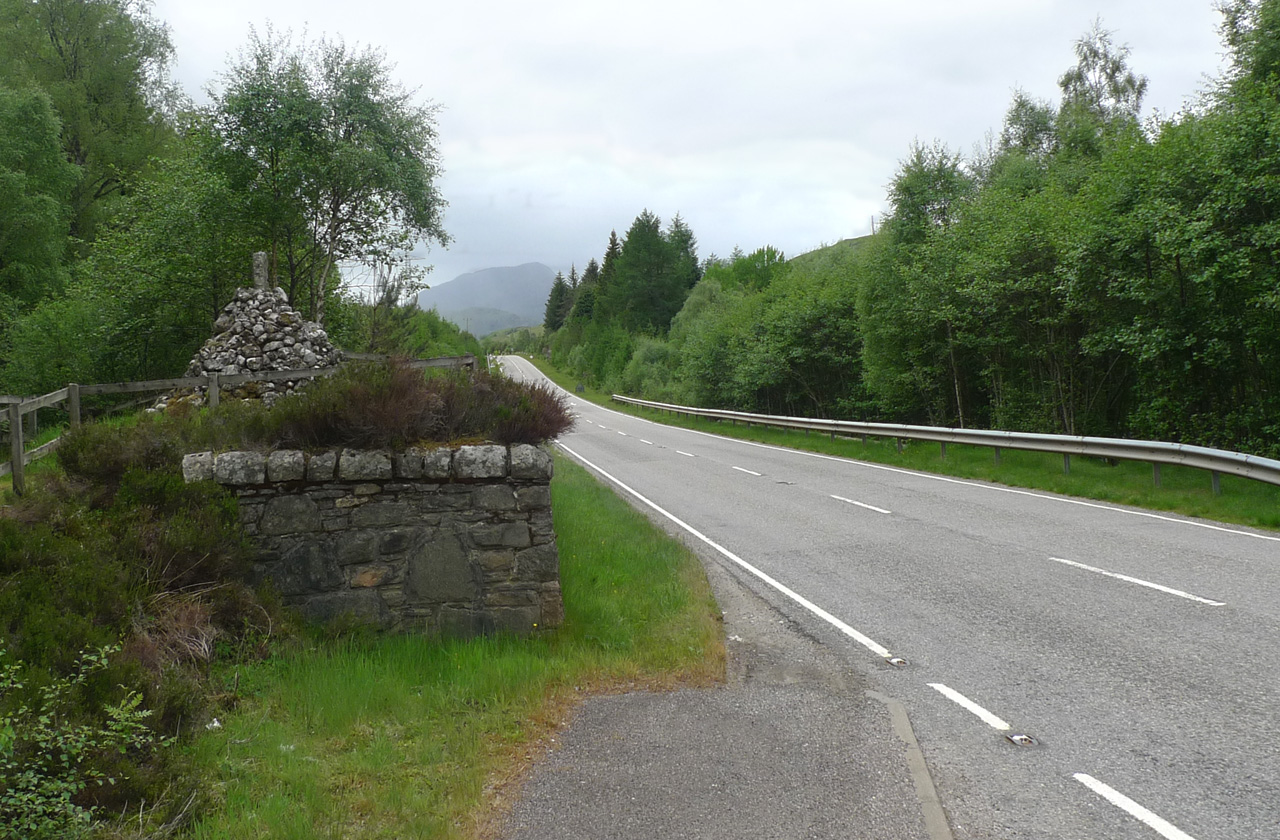
Roderick Mackenzie's cairn in Glenmoriston

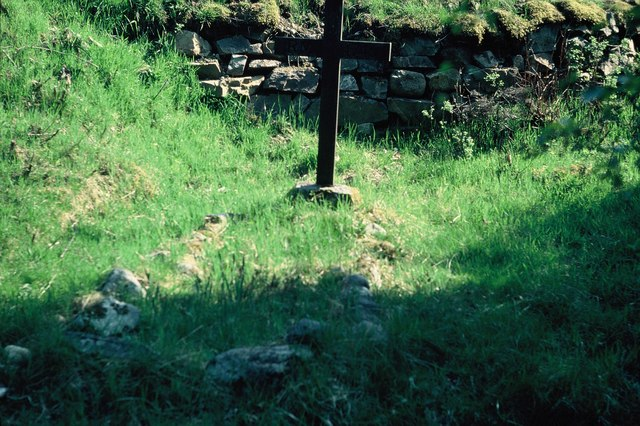
Roderick Mackenzie's grave in Glenmoriston

== See also ==
- Raids on Lochaber and Shiramore
- Hector Roy Mackenzie
- Thomas Mackenzie of Pluscarden
- Kenneth Mackenzie of Suddie
