= Ose, Skye =

Coordinates: 57.37887°N 6.47004°W

Ose: Scottish Gaelic: Òs
- Location within the Isle of Skye
- OS grid reference: NG314408
- Council area: Highland
- Country: Scotland
- Sovereign state: United Kingdom
- Postcode district: IV56 8
- Police: Scotland
- Fire: Scottish
- Ambulance: Scottish

Ose (Scottish Gaelic: Òs) is a small coastal settlement of Loch Bracadale, in the Scottish Highland area. It lies on the west coast of the Isle of Skye between Dunvegan and Struan; the A863 road passes through Ose between Dunvegan to the north and the Skye Bridge to the south and east.
