= River Garry, Inverness-shire =

River and power stations in Scotland

River Garry
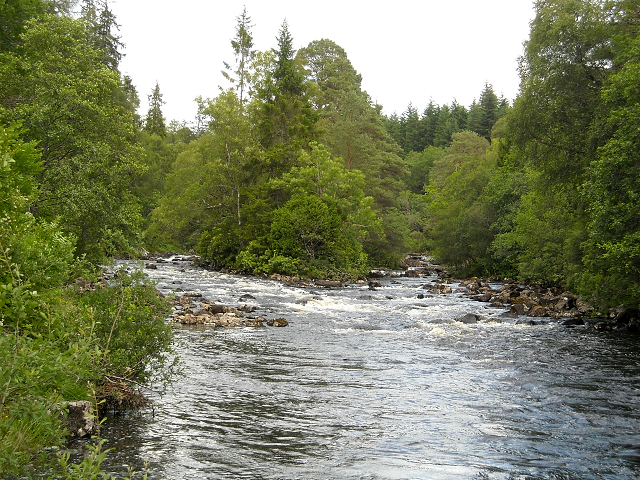
- The River Garry near Invergarry

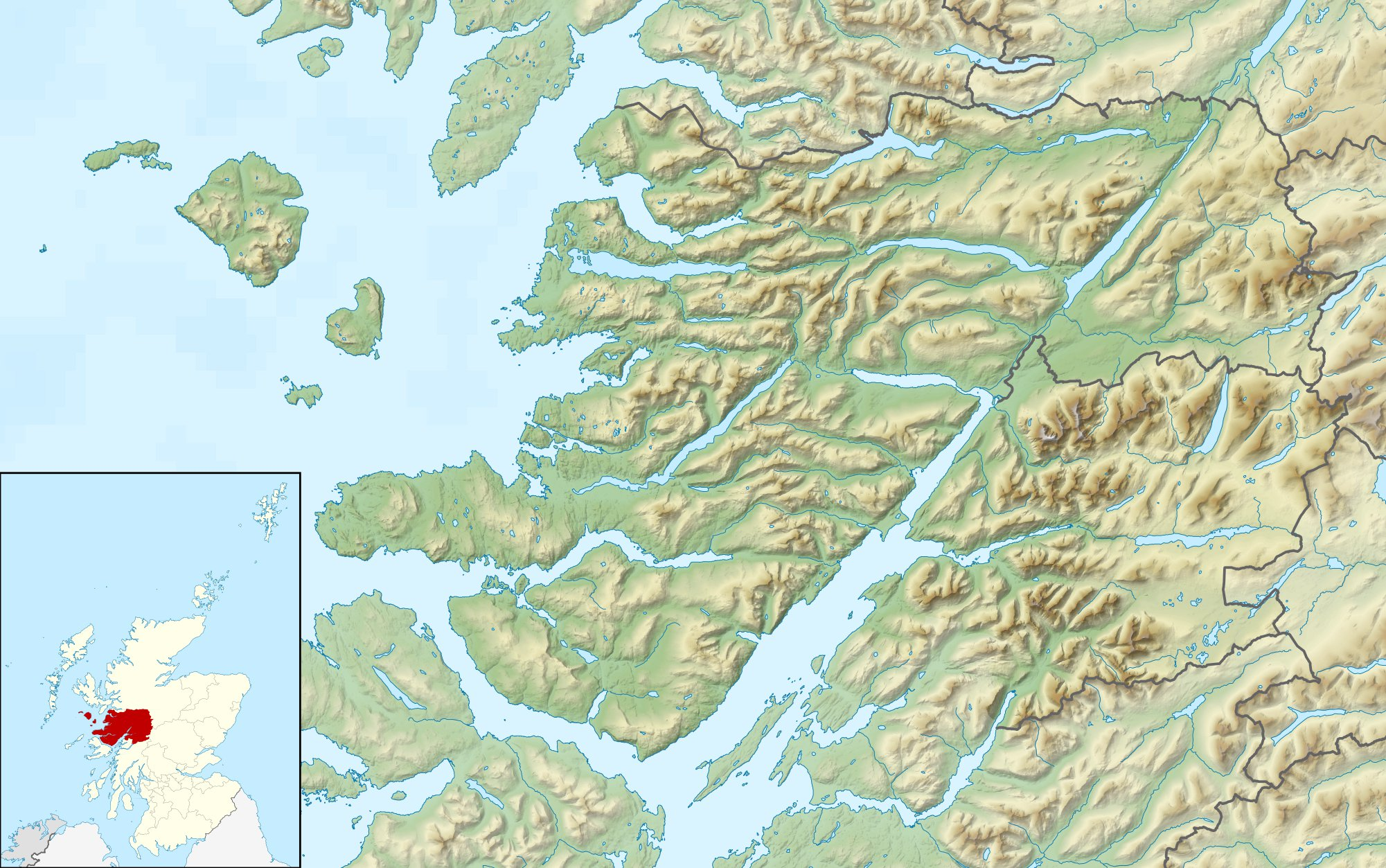
- Location of the mouth within Lochaber

Location
- Country: Scotland

Physical characteristics
- Source
  - location: The Rough Bounds
  - coordinates: 57.0394°N 5.4066°W
- Mouth
  - location: Loch Oich
  - coordinates: 57.0701°N 4.7783°W
- Length: 14.5 miles (23.3 km)

The River Garry (Scottish Gaelic: Garadh / Abhainn Gharadh) in Inverness-shire is a Scottish river punctuated by two long Lochs, in the region of Lochaber. It flows broadly west to east through Glen Garry, starting in a wilderness to the east of Knoydart and ending at Loch Oich in the Great Glen, which forms part of the Caledonian Canal. There are a few tiny settlements within Glen Garry, but the only village of any size near to the river is Invergarry, at its mouth. Loch Quoich at the western end of the watercourse is dammed by the largest mass earth fill dam in Scotland, and supplies water to Quoich hydroelectric power station. Loch Garry is dammed by a much smaller dam in the gorge where the river begins its descent to Invergarry, and supplies water to Invergarry hydroelectric power station, close to the mouth of the river. Both hydroelectric schemes were built in the 1950s, with the aim of stimulating economic regeneration in the area. They have altered the ecology of the river, as both lochs were made considerably bigger as a result of constructing the dams.

The two lochs were an important factor in the construction of the Caledonian Canal, which was completed in 1822, and the commissioners were empowered to embank them to ensure that the canal had enough water to operate the large locks. In practice, clearing of rocks from the river channel where it exited Loch Garry and the fitting of a sluice to control the outflow from Lock Quoich were the main modifications made to the waterway by the canal commissioners.

== Route ==
The river rises as a series of streams in The Rough Bounds, an area of sparsely populated wilderness to the east of Knoydart, which flow into Loch Cuaich or Loch Quoich. The loch lies in a broadly east-west direction, and covers an area of 6.74 square miles (17.46 km^{2}). Its surface is 666 feet (203 m) above ordnance datum (AOD), and it has a maximum depth of 281 feet (86 m). At its extreme western end, it is separated by two small dams from Lochan na Cruadhach and another small loch, which flow to the west to reach the sea at Loch Nevis. Near the midpoint of the loch is a finger of water that points in a north-westerly direction, and is fed by a stream called Allt Coire nan Cnamh, which flows through Loch Coire nan Cnamh and Loch a' Choire Bheithe to become Caolie Water before it joins Loch Quoich. A second finger occupies Glen Quoich, and is fed by Allt Coire a' Chaorainn flowing eastwards, the Wester Glen Quoich Burn and the River Quoich flowing southwards, and the Easter Glen Quoich Burn flowing westwards. A minor road runs along the northern shore of the first finger and crosses the second on a bridge, to continue along the north shore of the loch.

The loch acts as a reservoir for the Quoich hydroelectric power station, and at its eastern end is a large dam. Prior to the construction of the dam, the river was crossed by a suspension footbridge a little further upstream. From the foot of the dam, the Garry heads south-east until it is joined by the River Kingie at Kingie Pool. The UK's Ordnance Survey refers to this upper section of the river as Gearr Garry. The river flows either side of an island called Eilean Dubh, and on the northern channel there is a small dam and Quoich power station. A little further downstream was a salmon trap, constructed before the Loch Quoich dam was completed. It was designed to prevent salmon moving further upstream, because their former spawning grounds were destroyed when the level of Loch Quoich was raised by over 100 feet (30 m). It was completed early in the construction programme to allow smolts in the upper river to move downstream before the dam was closed. The trap was built of concrete, and is 345 feet (105 m) long. Fertilised ova from the fish caught in the trap were removed and sent to a hatchery at Invergarry operated by the Hydro Electric Board.

Below the fish trap, the river widens into Loch Poulary, and then narrows again for the next river section. To the south of the hamlet of Tomdoun, it enters the tiny Loch Doire Aoidheil, and shortly afterwards, flows into the western end of Loch Garry. Loch Garry covers an area of 2.65 square miles (6.86 km^{2}) and its surface is at 272 feet (83 m) AOD, with a maximum depth of 213 feet (64.9 m). About one quarter of the distance along its length, it is crossed by a bridge carrying a track to Torr na Carraidh, a hill on its southern shore that rises to 404 feet (123 m). The minor road that followed the north bank of Loch Cuaich continues along the northern bank of Loch Garry, but towards its eastern end joins the A82 Invergarry to Kyle of Lochalsh road.

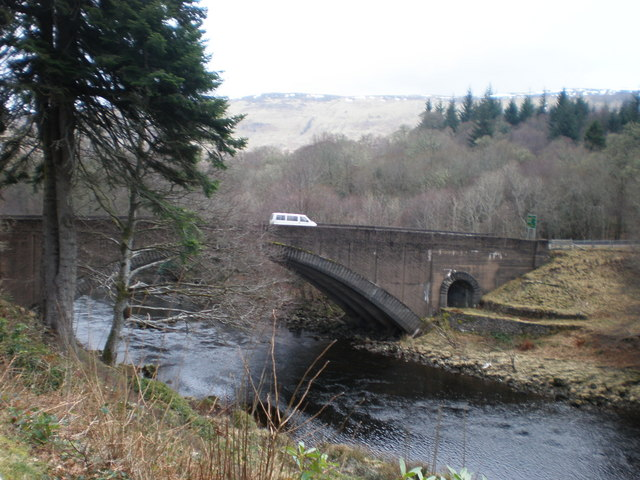
The bridge carrying the A82 road over the river was built in 1932

The level of Loch Garry has been raised by the construction of a dam at its eastern end, where the river formerly passed through a gorge. The dam includes a Borland-type fish pass, which works in a similar way to a canal lock, enabling salmon to access Loch Garry. Immediately downstream of the dam is a category C listed suspension footbridge, designed by the engineers Speirs and Company of Glasgow, and dating from the late 19th century. White Bridge is a little further downstream, and as the river enters the village of Invergarry, the only substantial settlement along its course, it is joined by Aldernaig Burn, flowing southwards from Loch Lundie, and is crossed by a category B listed bowstring suspension footbridge with a wooden deck. It was erected in 1892, and carries a plaque that states: "Erected by Mrs Ellice of Glengarry and Glenquoich 1892". The bridge is an early steel design which spans 197 feet (60 m), but by 2009 some of the main trusses were sufficiently corroded that it was closed for safety reasons. Repairs were made by the Forestry Commission, and the bridge reopened in 2011. A more substantial bridge carries the A82 Inverness to Fort William road over the river. Its single arch was constructed of concrete in 1932, and it was probably designed by Mears and Carus-Wilson. Prior to its construction and the re-alignment of the A82, the road crossed the river further downstream on a single span bridge dating from the early 19th century. This then only carried local traffic for the Glengarry Castle Hotel and nearby housing, but the upstream face collapsed in 2020, and it has been closed to all traffic. Some 3.5 miles (5.6 km) from Loch Garry, the river enters Loch Oich, the surface level of which is 105 feet (32 m) AOD.

Near the mouth of the river is Invergarry power station. Invergarry is near the site of the 17th century Invergarry Castle, once the seat of the MacDonell of Glengarry branch of Clan Donald, whose homeland is Glen Garry, the valley surrounding the river.

== Hydro-electric power ==
Loch Cuaich and Loch Garry are both used to supply water to hydro-electric power stations. The first proposals for hydro-electric power on the River Garry and the River Moriston, a little further to the north, were proposed in 1928 and were set out in the West Highland Power Bill. It was promoted by a private company, and would have involved diverting the water to the west coast, rather than allowing it to continue flowing eastwards to the Great Glen. The bill was rejected by Parliament, as were three Caledonian Water Power Bills for similar projects proposed in 1936, 1937 and 1938.

The Garry–Moriston scheme, which includes further power stations on the River Moriston, was one of several constructed by the North of Scotland Hydro-Electric Board, a public body formed in 1943 to promote water power in the Highlands. They used profits from similar schemes in the southern Highlands to fund remote schemes such as this, in order to stimulate economic regeneration of the area. The architect James Shearer ensured that the buildings blended into the landscape in an era where people were increasingly concerned about the impact of construction schemes on the scenery. The dam at the eastern end of Loch Cuaich is a large mass earth fill dam, constructed in 1955 by W M Halcrow and Partners. The design was by the engineers James Williamson and Partners, with input from Shearer. The dam consists of a compacted earth core, with a reinforced concrete wall on its upstream face and coursed masonry on its downstream face. Rather than having a conventional spillway running down the dam, excess water is fed into a tunnel at the intake gatehouse, and discharges into a spillway cut into the rock beyond its northern edge. At the bottom of the spillway, it is shaped like a ski jump, so that water cascading down the slope rises up into the air and falls into the river as spray, some distance from the foundations of the dam. The dam is 125 feet (38 m) high and 1,050 feet (320 m) long, and was the largest dam of its type in Scotland when it was built. Compensation water to maintain the flow in the river below the dam is discharged through a discharge valve at the centre of the dam, which has a small turbine hall built over the top of it.

Quoich power station is a medium-sized power station, with a single 22MW undershot turbine. The water arrives at the station from Loch Cuaich through a pipeline with a surge shaft, which is located to the north of the station. After powering the turbine, the water discharges into the Garry. Power from the turbine is fed to a transformer station surrounded by a large boundary wall topped by coping stones, located to the east of the turbine house, from where it feeds overhead transmission lines.

The dam at the eastern end of Loch Garry is a mass gravity structure, 154 feet (47 m) long and 56 feet (17 m) high, which was completed in 1956. Like the dam at Loch Cuaich, compensation water to maintain the flow in the river below the dam passes through a small generator. Invergarry power station was designed by the architects Gratton and McLean and constructed in 1950-51. It is housed in a low single-storey building with a sunken courtyard at the front, so that it is much less obtrusive than it might otherwise be. In order to help it blend into the landscape, it was constructed of local stone. It has a capacity of 20 MW, and a pipeline from Loch Garry provides a head of 175 feet (53.3 m) to a Kaplan moveable blade turbine. The pipeline is 16.5 feet (5.0 m) in diameter, and runs for about 3 miles (4.8 km). The transformers and switchgear for the station are hidden behind the building, and are not visible from the road.

== History ==
The River Garry runs through an area which experiences some of the highest amounts of rainfall in Scotland, and this has contributed to its importance both for the operation of the Caledonian Canal and later for the production of hydro electric power. The river is around 14.5 miles (23.3 km) long from the outfall at Loch Quoich to the month at Invergarry, and runs through Glen Garry, which is located in the Caol and Mallaig ward of the Highlands. This has a population density of only 11.25 per square mile (4.34/km^{2}), which is significantly lower than that for the Highlands in general. At the 2011 census, there were 275 residents within Glen Garry, grouped into 142 households. This is around one-quarter of the number resident in the 18th century, for the region was depopulated by emigration to Canada between 1773 and 1850, as a result of the Highland Clearances. During that period, sheep farming became the main source of employment within the Glen, with forestry also important, as large quantities of wood were needed for the building of the Caledonian Canal. Around 20 percent of the catchment is woodland, which is higher than most of the Highlands.

Residents of the Glen traditionally spoke Gaelic, but use of the language has declined, as a result of emigration, immigration by sheep farmers, and English and Welsh people moving into the area in the early 2000s. When the hydro-electric schemes of the 1950s were being promoted, adverts were produced in Gaelic, but its use has since almost disappeared from the Glen.

When the Caledonian Canal was being proposed, surveys showed that Loch Oich would be the highest point on the canal. Although it was relatively small, it was fed by the River Garry, and this would ensure that there was plenty of water to enable the locks to be operated. When an Act of Parliament was obtained in 1803 to authorise the construction of the canal, it gave the commissioners powers to embank Loch Garry and Loch Quoich, as well as Loch Arkaig, which feeds into Loch Lochy, so that they could act as reservoirs more effectively. The canal was completed in 1822, and the effectiveness of the lochs as reservoirs was tested in 1824. The summer was particularly dry, and the region suffered from drought, resulting in the level of Loch Oich dropping by 3.5 feet (1.1 m). In order to ease the situation, rocks in the river at the outflow of Loch Garry were cleared away, to improve the flow, and a regulating sluice was fitted to the outlet of Loch Quoich, so that water could be stored in the loch to be used by the canal when necessary.

As well as the generation of hydro-electric power, the waters of the Aldernaig Burn were used to power a corn mill. The mill building has two storeys and four bays, and once had an internal kiln. It dates from the late 18th century, and ceased to be used for grinding corn around 1927. The wheel and all internal machinery had been removed by 1976, and since conversion to a house in 1995, it is almost unrecognisable as a mill. It stands in a group with a whitewashed cottage dating from 1878, at the rear of which was the Invergarry Store and Post Office. The original bridge stands next to the mill, which was bypassed when the A87 road was improved.

A landslide occurred near the Quoich dam in November 2018, when 9,000 tonnes of rock and earth moved towards the river. This did not damage the dam, as it was deflected by the overflow spillway, but the material was spread over about 1 mile (1.6 km), blocking the road, destroying electricity and telephone lines, and preventing the dam from operating.

== Ecology ==
A comprehensive study was carried out in the 2010s into the effects of the dams on fish stocks in the river, particularly salmon, where numbers had dropped by a factor of more than ten between 1956 and 2019. The numbers were based on the fish counter at the Garry dam. As a result of increased water levels in the lochs following construction of the dams, some 40 percent of the salmon habitat had been destroyed, and what was left had often been changed. No spawning fish or juveniles were found in the Gearr Garry, below the Quoich dam, and factors affecting the salmon included changes to the chemistry and temperature of the compensation water, which was released from the bottom of the reservoir, issues arising from the fish trap near Quoich power station, the presence of invasive pike and minnows, and interbreeding between wild and farmed salmon. During the planning for the hydroelectric scheme, the Fisheries Committee had advised that the level of Loch Quoich should remain the same, and that a fish pass should be built to allow the salmon to reach the loch, advice that was subsequently ignored. The fish trap was installed to collect eggs for rearing in a hatchery, initially at Invergarry but subsequently next to Quoich power station. The siting of the fish trap below the mouth of the River Kingie prevented fish using the spawning grounds on that river.

Juveniles hatched in the hatchery were often sold for release elsewhere, and imported juveniles were released into the Garry. In 2003, only one fish entered the trap, and the hatchery was no longer operating. J Watt produced a report in 2004 which recommending removal of the trap, which was implemented later that year, and a second report in 2006 found that salmon were thriving in the Kingie, but none were found in the Gearr Garry. A further report in 2012 led to the creation of the Upper Garry Salmon Restoration Project, to re-stock the river. Smolts were trapped and reared, with genetic profiling used to identify those that were probably descended from the original native population. Eggs from these were released into the Kingie, and initial results were promising. Another study in 2019 established that survival rates for smolts passing through the turbines and tailrace screens at Invergarry power station were 86 percent, and so the inlet screens, against which they were being squashed by the current, were removed in 2020, and the design of the tailrace screens was altered to improve survival rates. A study to assess the impact of sediment deposited in the Gearr Garry by the 2018 landslide had to be cancelled due to the 2019 coronavirus pandemic.

Improvements to enable salmon to access the river will probably also benefit other species which move between the sea and fresh water habitats, such as lampreys and eels. The river has resident populations of fresh water fish including brown trout and Arctic char, which have suffered decline since the hydro-electric schemes altered their habitat. Angling is important to the economy of the Glen and to the wider area, as salmon migrate from the river back to the sea. However, surveys indicate that only about nine percent of salmon within the Ness catchment, including those from the River Garry, actually reach the sea. Research into why the number is so low, and whether the Caledonian Canal affects the total was ongoing in 2020.

== Bibliography ==
- Cameron, A.D. (2005). The Caledonian Canal. Edinburgh: Birlinn. ISBN 978-1-84158-403-4.
- Groome, Francis H. (1885). Ordnance Gazetteer of Scotland: A Survey of Scottish Topography, Statistical, Biographical and Historical. Gazetteer for Scotland.
- Jepsen, Niels; Hurst-Brown, Victoria, eds. (19 May 2020). "Report of Case Studies Demonstrating the Effects of Barrier Removal, Mitigation and Installation" (PDF). Amber International. Archived (PDF) from the original on 26 January 2022.
- NoSHEB (1982). "Garry - Moriston" (PDF). North of Scotland Hydro Electric Board. Archived (PDF) from the original on 24 August 2022.
- Priestley, Joseph (1831). "Historical Account of the Navigable Rivers, Canals, and Railways of Great Britain". Archived from the original on 3 March 2016.
- Webster, Helen (4 June 2011). "Invergarry footbridge gets makeover". Walkhighlands. Archived from the original on 29 August 2022.
