= Dalchreichart =

Coordinates: 57.17398°N 4.82376°W

Dalchreichart: Scottish Gaelic: Dul Chreachaird
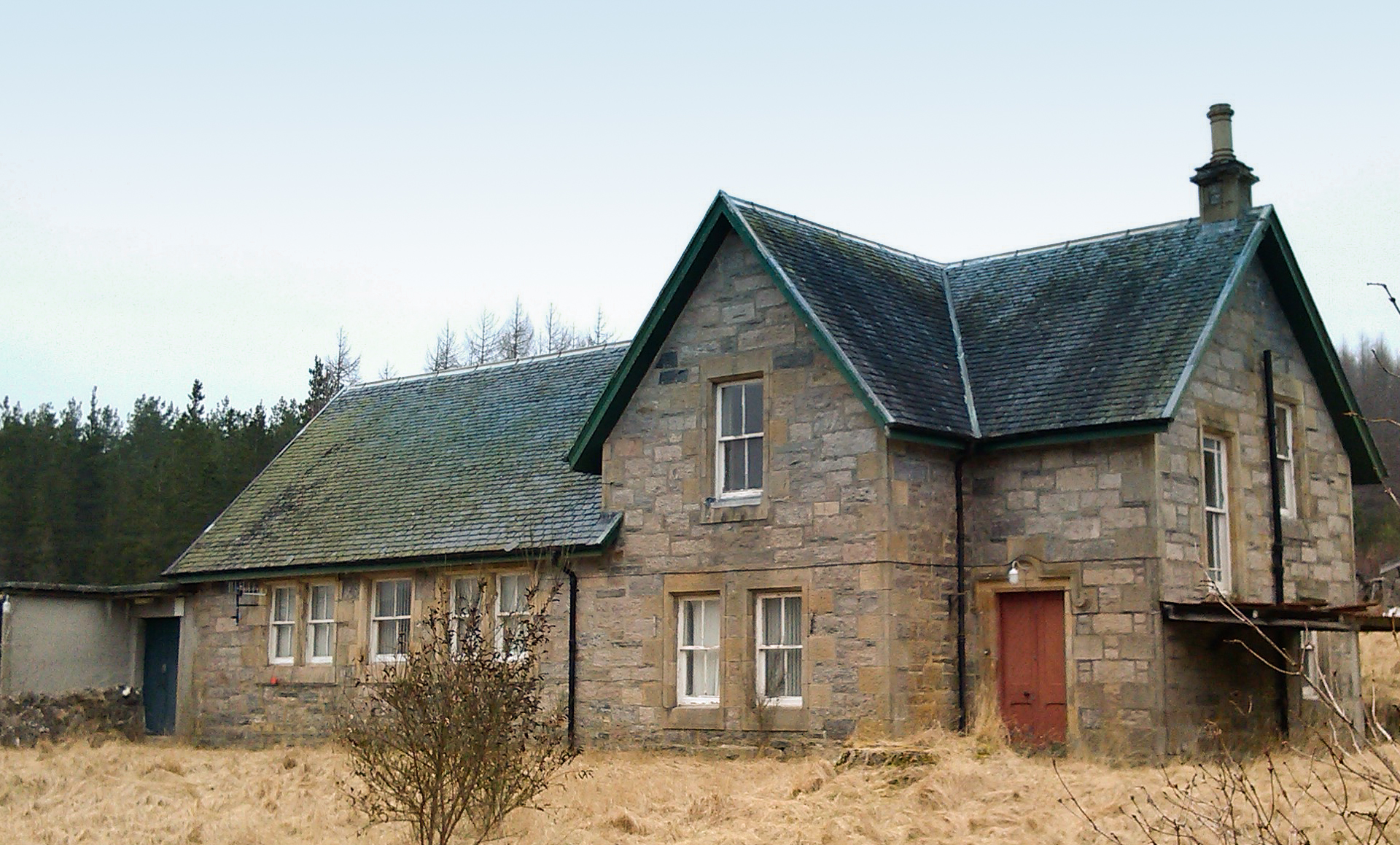
- Former Dalchreichart school

- Location within the Inverness area
- OS grid reference: NH293127
- Council area: Highland
- Country: Scotland
- Sovereign state: United Kingdom
- Post town: Inverness
- Postcode district: IV63 7
- Police: Scotland
- Fire: Scottish
- Ambulance: Scottish

Dalchreichart (Scottish Gaelic: Dul Chreachaird) is a small hamlet in Glen Moriston, Inverness-shire, in the Highland council area of Scotland. It lies about 15 km west of Invermoriston.

== Geography ==
Dalchreichart is a linear settlement, spread out along a minor road on the northern side of the River Moriston. The A887 road runs past along the southern side of the river. This road used to be the main route to Skye before it was re-routed to the southern side of the river and widened.

== Community ==
Dalchreichart had a primary school, but it was mothballed in 2002 after the school roll dropped to just two pupils, then formally closed in 2006. In April 2013 the community voted to enter into 1-year lease of the School with an option to purchase it from the Highlands Council within that time. Various projects are now being developed to benefit the local community. New houses are being developed in Dalchreichart and the fish farm to the south is expanding to accommodate increasing demand for young salmon. Wildlife is abundant around the area with house martins, red squirrels and buzzards seen regularly, as well as the wandering sheep and deer of course!
