= Sligachan =

Coordinates: 57.289334°N 6.175554°W

Sligachan: Scottish Gaelic: Sligeachan
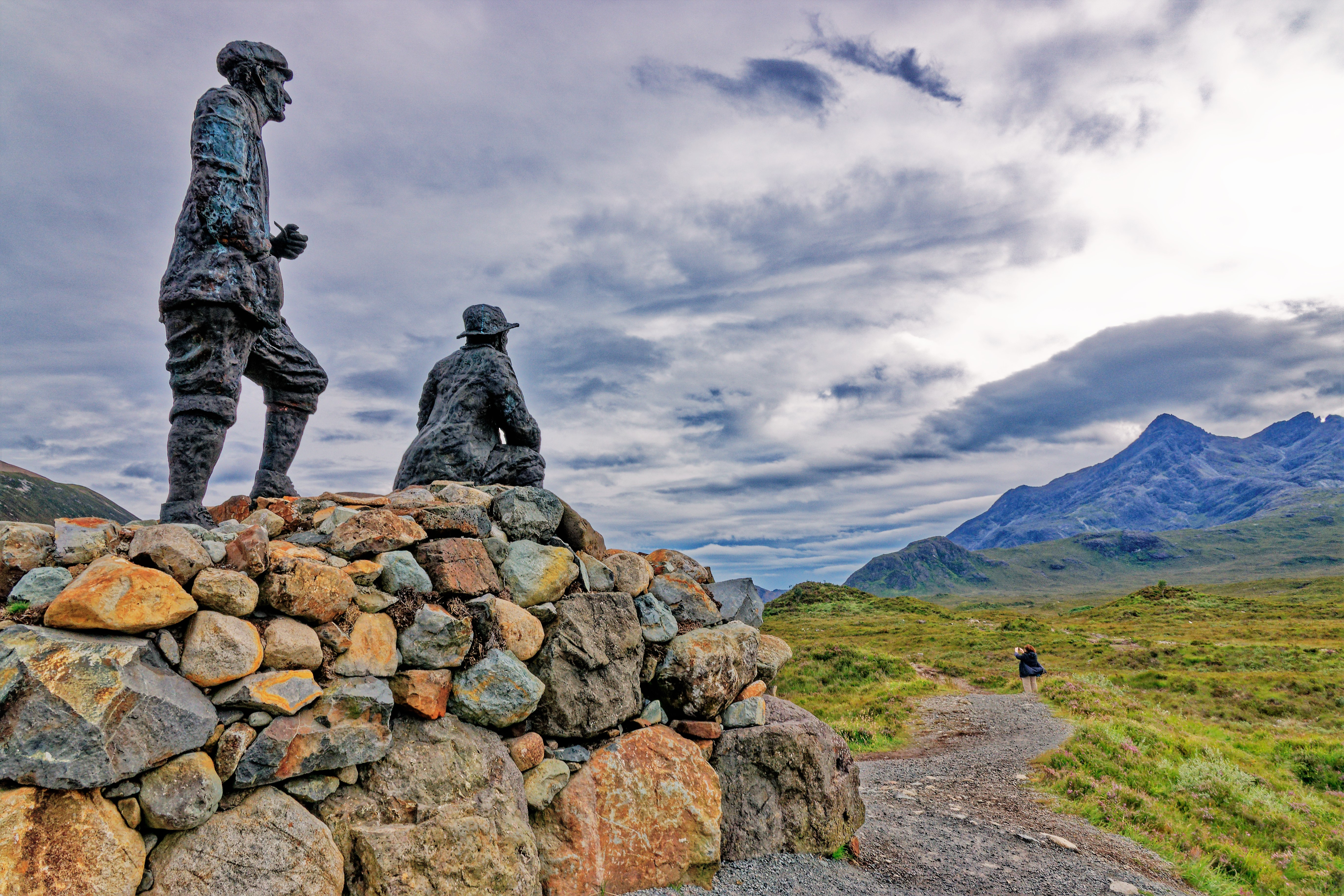
- Monument Heroes of the Hills.

- Location within the Isle of Skye
- OS grid reference: NG485298
- Council area: Highland
- Lieutenancy area: Ross and Cromarty
- Country: Scotland
- Sovereign state: United Kingdom
- Post town: ISLE OF SKYE
- Postcode district: IV47
- Dialling code: 01478
- Police: Scotland
- Fire: Scottish
- Ambulance: Scottish
- UK Parliament: Inverness, Skye and West Ross-shire
- Scottish Parliament: Ross, Skye and Inverness West

Sligachan (Scottish Gaelic: Sligeachan) is a small settlement on Skye, Scotland. It is close to the Cuillin mountains and provides a good viewpoint for seeing the Black Cuillin mountains.

== Amenities ==
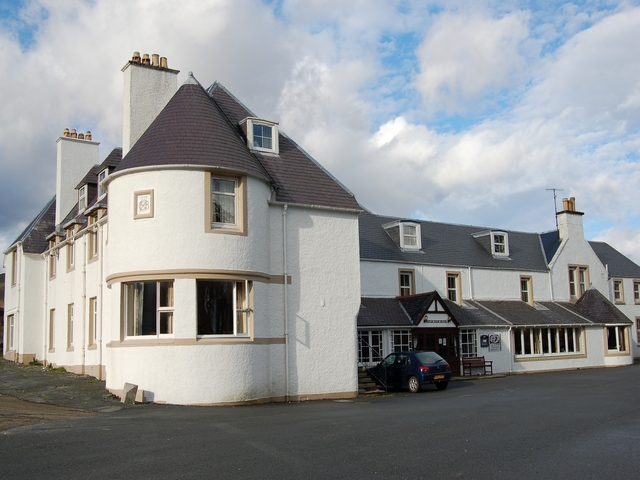
Sligachan Hotel

Sligachan is situated at the junction of the roads from Portree, Dunvegan, and Broadford. The hotel was built at this road junction around 1830. Many early climbers chose this as a spot to start ascents of the Cuillin. Today there is also a campsite and bunkhouse adjacent to the hotel. There is also a small microbrewery which is operated in the same building as the hotel.

== Battle ==
Tradition has it that the Lord of the Isles attacked Skye in 1395, but William MacLeod met the MacDonalds at Sligachan and drove them back to Loch Eynort (Ainort). There they found that their galleys had been moved offshore by the MacAskills and every invader was killed. The spoils were divided at Creag an Fheannaidh ('Rock of the Flaying') or Creggan ni feavigh ('Rock of the Spoil'), sometimes identified with the Bloody Stone in Harta Corrie below the heights of Sgurr nan Gillean.

== Sligachan old bridge ==
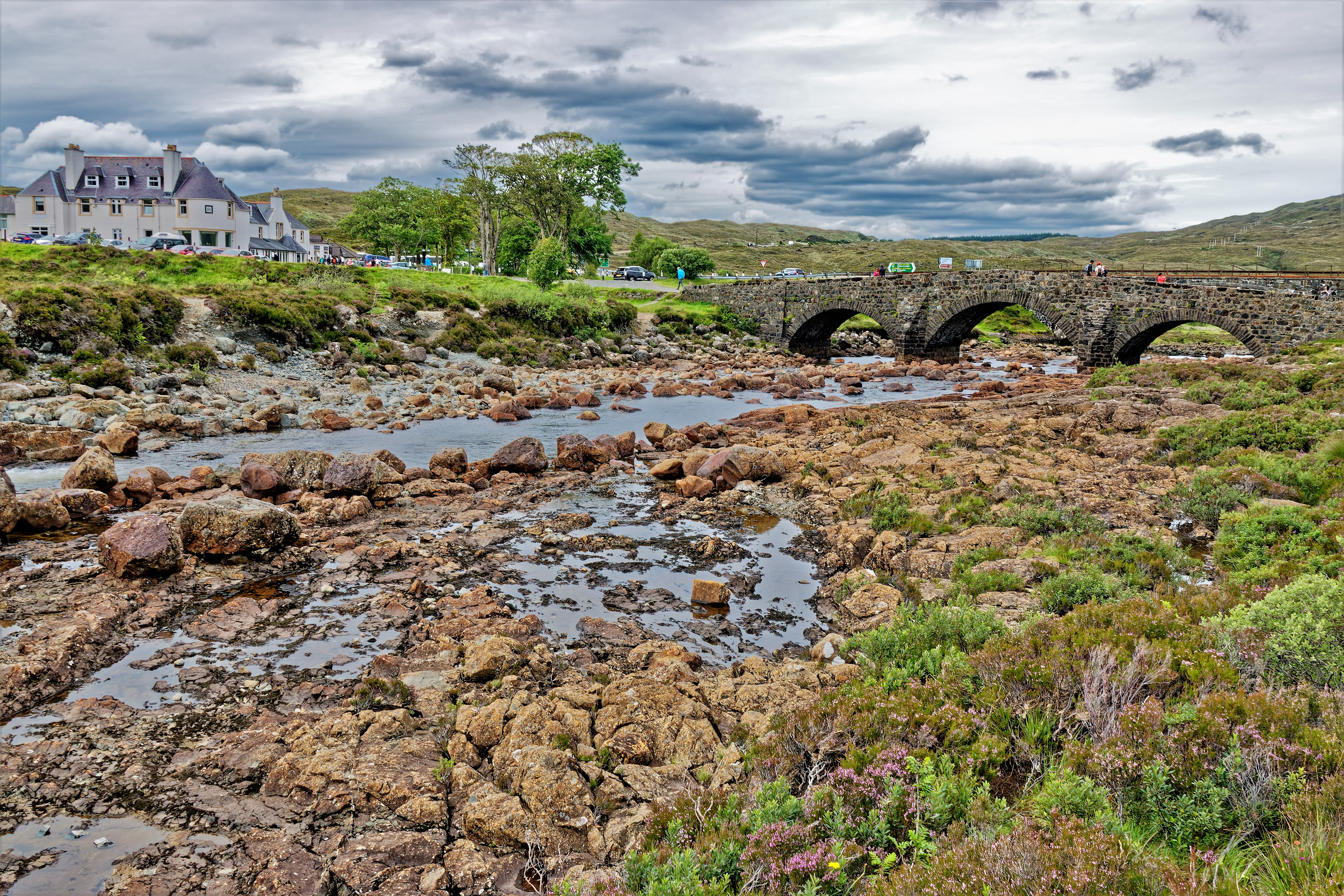
Sligachan Old Bridge

The Sligachan Old Bridge was built between 1810 and 1818 by engineer Thomas Telford. The bridge is for pedestrians and cyclists only following construction of a new road bridge parallel to it on the A87. It was listed as a Category B and scheduled in 1971 and 1974, respectively. Historic Environment Scotland de-scheduled the bridge in 2016 (the listing remains in place).
