= Upper Breakish =

Coordinates: 57.243442°N 5.838632°W

Upper Breakish: Scottish Gaelic: Breacais Àrd
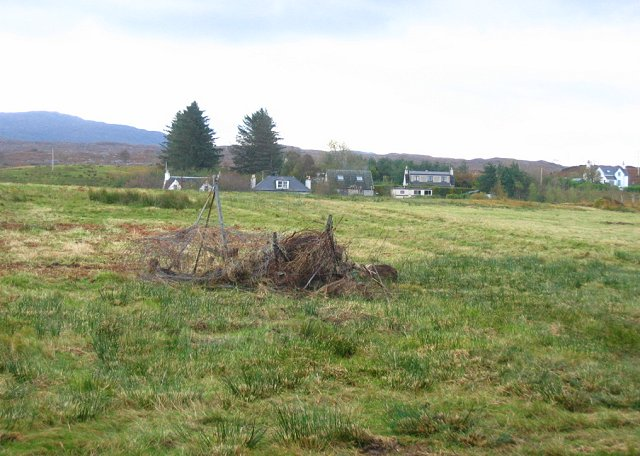
- Upper Breakish. Looking south across wet grassland to the row of houses along the A87

- Location within the Isle of Skye
- OS grid reference: NG685235
- Council area: Highland
- Lieutenancy area: Ross and Cromarty
- Country: Scotland
- Sovereign state: United Kingdom
- Post town: ISLE OF SKYE
- Postcode district: IV42
- Dialling code: 01471
- Police: Scotland
- Fire: Scottish
- Ambulance: Scottish
- UK Parliament: Ross, Skye and Lochaber
- Scottish Parliament: Ross, Skye and Inverness West

Upper Breakish (Scottish Gaelic: Breacais Àrd) is a village on the Isle of Skye in Scotland in the United Kingdom.

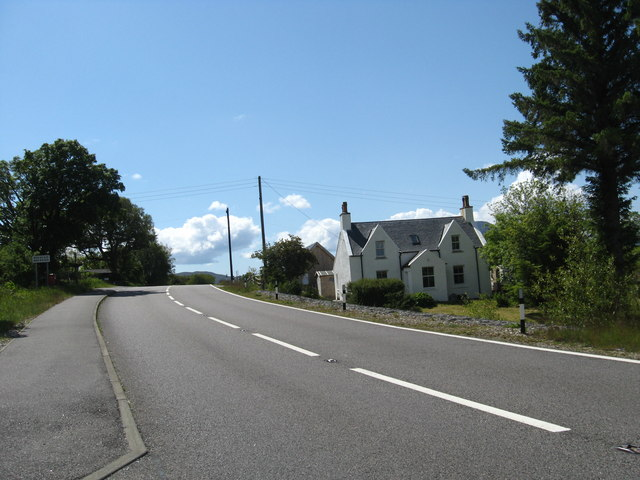
Entering Upper Breakish from the east
