= Edinbane =

Coordinates: 57.47°N 6.43°W

Edinbane: Scottish Gaelic: An t-Aodann Bàn
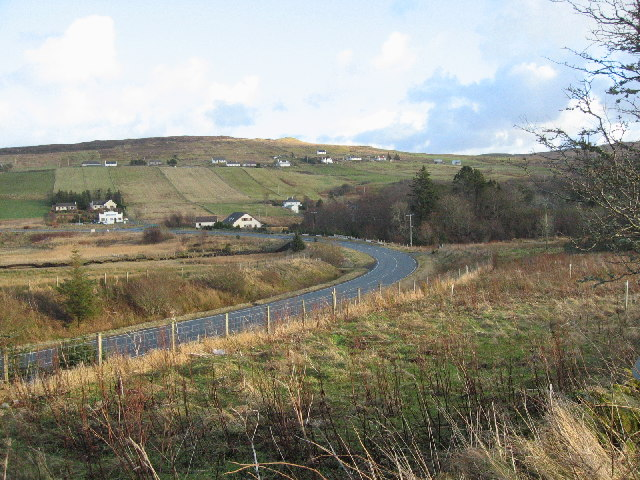
- Edinbane at the head of Loch Greshornish

- Location within the Isle of Skye
- OS grid reference: NG343508
- Council area: Highland
- Lieutenancy area: Ross and Cromarty
- Country: Scotland
- Sovereign state: United Kingdom
- Post town: PORTREE
- Postcode district: IV51
- Dialling code: 01470
- Police: Scotland
- Fire: Scottish
- Ambulance: Scottish
- UK Parliament: Inverness, Skye and West Ross-shire
- Scottish Parliament: Skye, Lochaber and Badenoch

Edinbane (Scottish Gaelic: An t-Aodann Bàn the fair hill-face) is a small village on the island of Skye, Scotland.

== Location ==
Edinbane lies on the A850 road at the foot of the Waternish Peninsula on the Isle of Skye, Scotland, 14 miles (23 kilometres) from Portree and 8 miles (13 kilometres) from Dunvegan. The name An t-Aodann Bàn is said to be taken from the white bog cotton plants that can be found on the hill sides. The village is based around the crofts with a small primary school and pottery. Notable buildings in Edinbane village are the former Gesto Hospital (c. 1870), the Edinbane Inn (c. 1900) and Edinbane Lodge, a stone-built hunting lodge built in 1543.

== History ==
There has been a settlement here since before 1600, but it was Kenneth MacLeod of Greshornish (1 December 1809, died unmarried in 1869) who founded the village.

=== Kenneth MacLeod of Greshornish ===
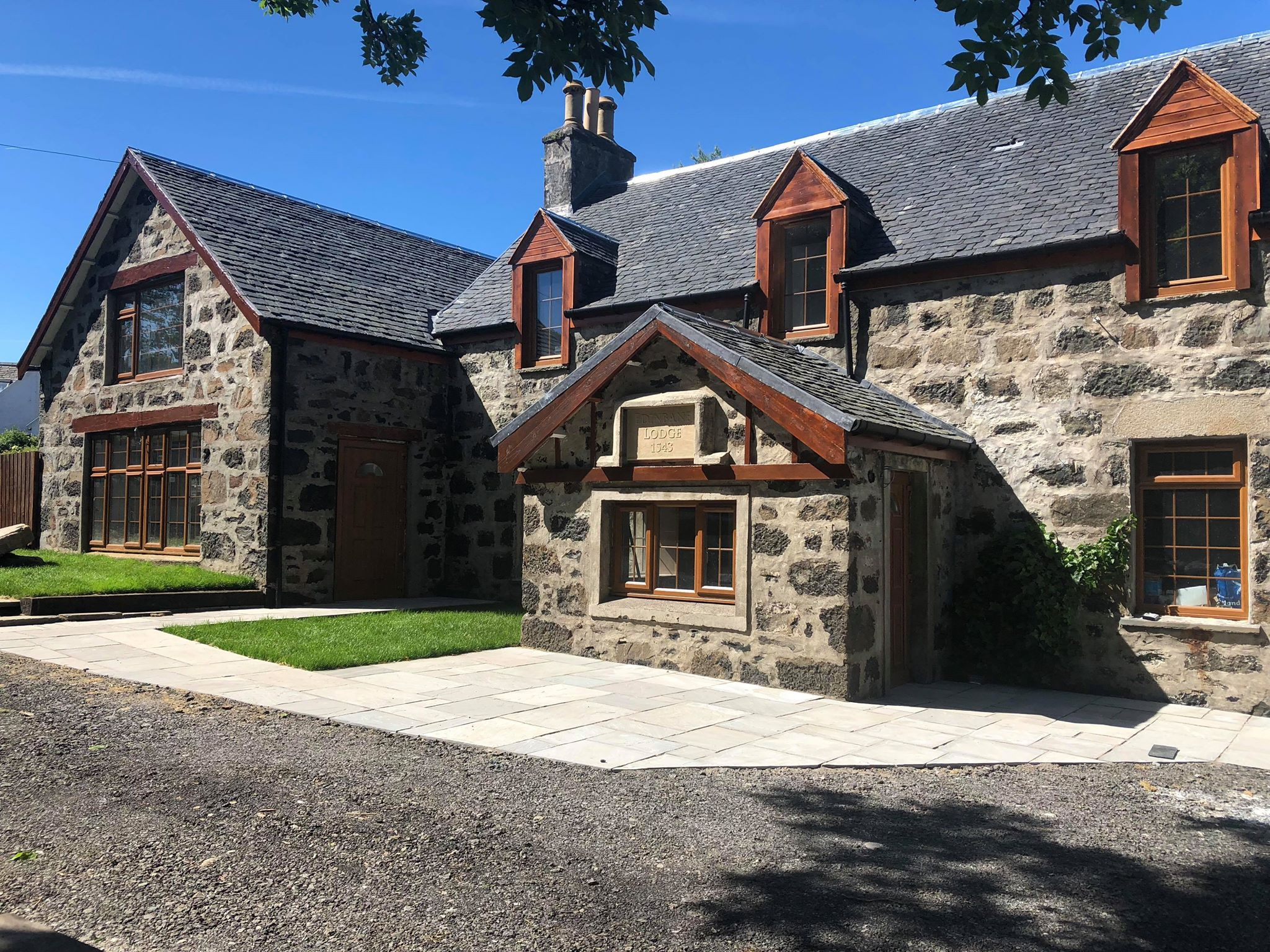
Edinbane Lodge

Kenneth McLeod's family had farmed land in the Gesto area of Skye for over 500 years. At the age of 15 he went to India, with his fare paid out and one golden guinea in his pocket, given him by Mrs MacDonald of Waternish. After a year's work, he took the river boat down to Calcutta. On the way he went ashore and visited a place where an auction of the contents of a sugar factory was in progress. With his precious Guinea, he bought a copper boiler, which he sold in Calcutta for £30. He now returned to the derelict sugar factory and bought it for very little. This set him on the ladder to making a fortune in India planting indigo.

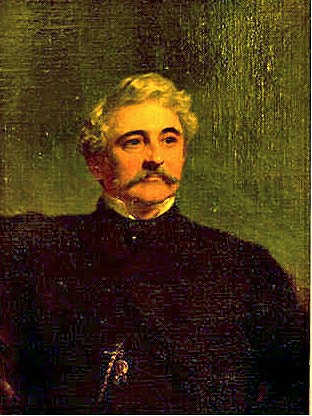
Kenneth MacLeod of Gesto

Returning to Skye, he endeavoured to buy the tack of Gesto but MacLeod of MacLeod was not prepared to sell. Kenneth then bought Orbost, Isle of Skye, Edinbane, Skirinish, Greshornishy, Tote and Skeabost and much of Portree. He ensured that the village had a tradesman from each of the important crafts. He set up the first hospital on Skye in Edinbane, aptly named Gesto. It has been renovated to luxury holiday accommodation Owlswood and Owls Nest apartments. .

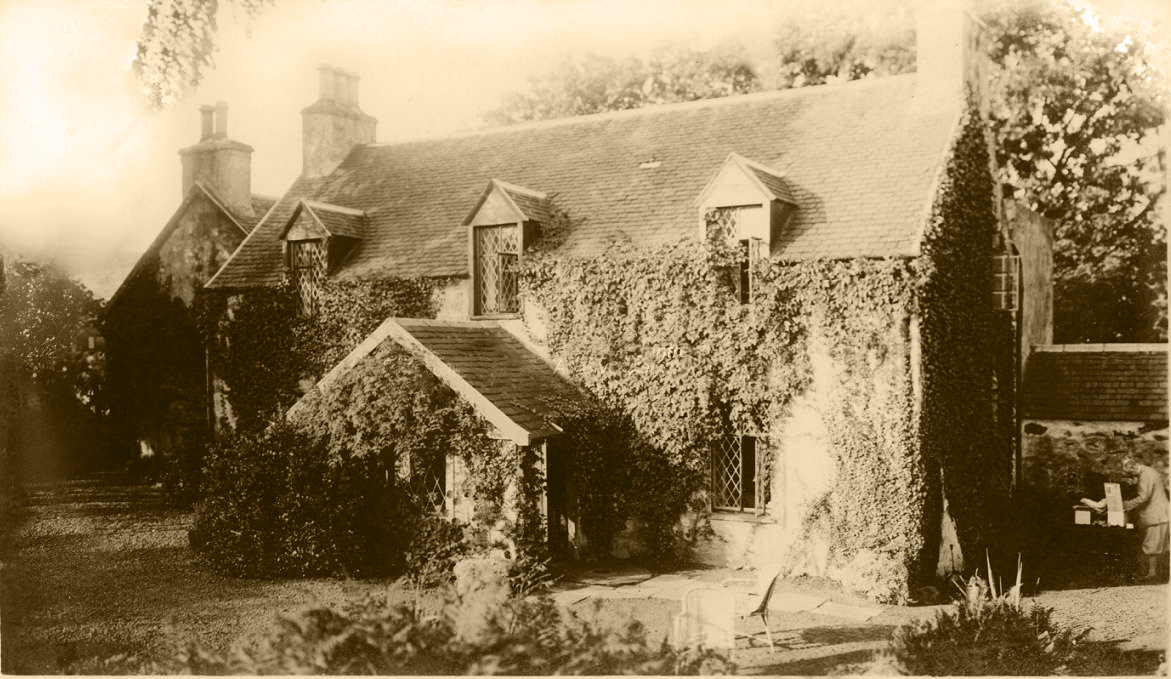
Edinbane Lodge in 1930s. Edward Langdale Hilleary on right of picture

=== Edinbane Lodge ===
Edinbane Lodge is the oldest coaching inn on the Isle of Skye, dating from 1543. Originally known as Tigh A Linne it operated as one of three change houses for travellers on their way between Portree and Dunvegan. It was purchased by Kenneth MacLeod of Greshornish in the 1860s and converted into a hunting lodge. In 1920 the Lodge was purchased by Edward Langdale Hilleary, a wealthy London businessman, and his wife Edith (née Robertson), niece of Kenneth MacLeod. In 1927 Edward Langdale Hilleary constructed a small hydro plant on the Abhainn Coishletter just behind the Lodge. The scheme supplied electricity to the nearby Gesto hospital and also powered the Lodge. Among other uses, Edinbane Lodge has served as the land court for the surrounding area, where people were tried for various offences including sheep rustling and more serious crimes. If found guilty and sentenced to death, the accused were hanged in the garden grounds. In 2018 Edinbane Lodge was purchased and restored by Scottish chef Calum Montgomery who converted the property into a restaurant with rooms. In November 2023 Edinbane Lodge took the title of Restaurant of the Year at the Scottish Excellence Awards and was included on the list of 1000 best restaurants in the world' by La Liste, improving it's ranking in 2024 to rank among the Top 500 In 2021 chef patron of Edinbane Lodge, Calum Montgomery, represented Scotland in season 17 of the BBC's Great British Menu returning to the show in season 19

=== Wind farm fire ===
On 24–25 April 2019, a major fire burned 5 square miles (13 square kilometres) of forestry at Edinbane wind farm.
