= Loch Cluanie =

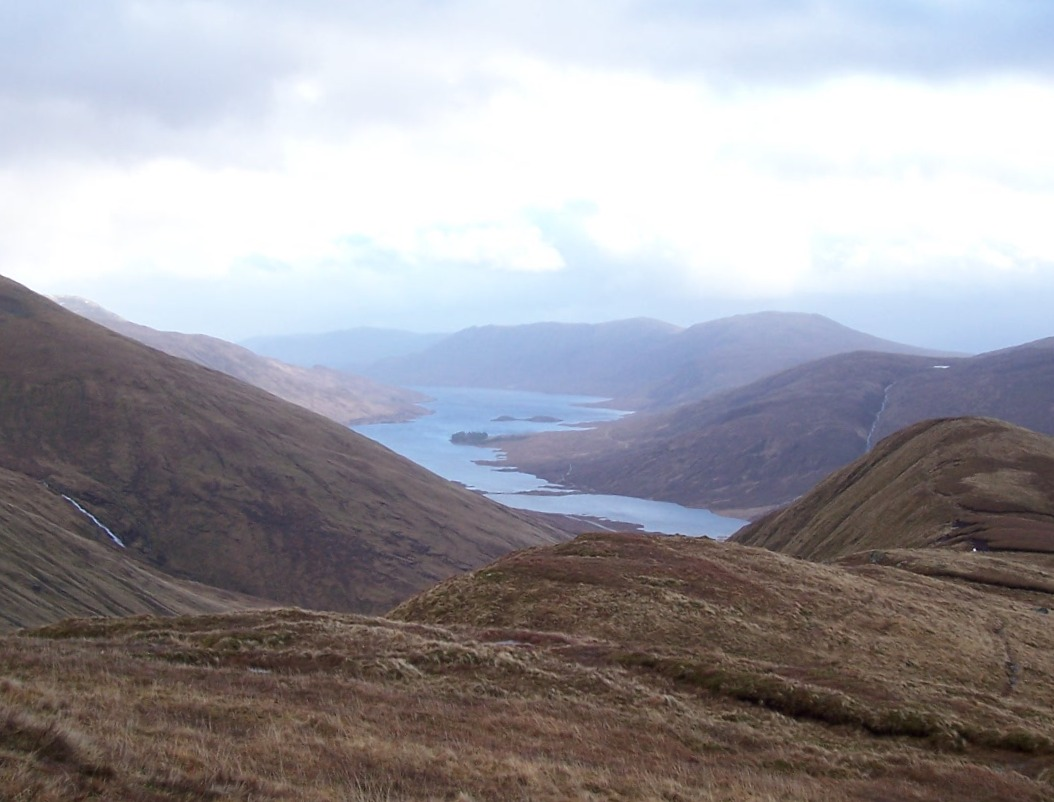
- Loch Cluanie and Beinn Loinne seen from Meall a' Charra

- Location within Highland
- Location: Northwest Highlands, Scotland
- Coordinates: 57°8′40″N 5°5′30″W
- Lake type: reservoir
- Basin countries: United Kingdom

Loch Cluanie (Scottish Gaelic: Loch Cluanaidh) is a loch in the Northwest Highlands of Scotland at the south-east end of Glen Shiel. It is a reservoir, contained behind the Cluanie Dam, constructed by Mitchell Construction and completed in 1957 as part of the North of Scotland Hydro-Electric Board's Glenmoriston project to generate hydroelectricity. Water feeds the dam from the west via two flows, from a tunnel from the dammed Loch Loyne and via the River Moriston.

The A87 road runs along the north edge of the loch.

The hamlet of Cluanie is on the west side of the loch. It has a car park, the Cluanie Inn and two houses which are used as "holiday homes" by their owners.

There is a weather station at Cluanie Inn. It is also at or near the start/end points of several walks into the neighbouring hills, which include several Munros.

Cluanie Lodge (NH097109) is an extensively renovated private dwelling owned by the estate, which is the primary residence of the owner, on the south-west corner of the loch. The richly vegetated areas at the side of the loch are home to small birds such as willow warbler and the wren.

== See also ==
- List of reservoirs and dams in the United Kingdom
