= Eyre, Skye =

Coordinates: 57.491°N 6.315°W

Eyre: Scottish Gaelic: Eighre
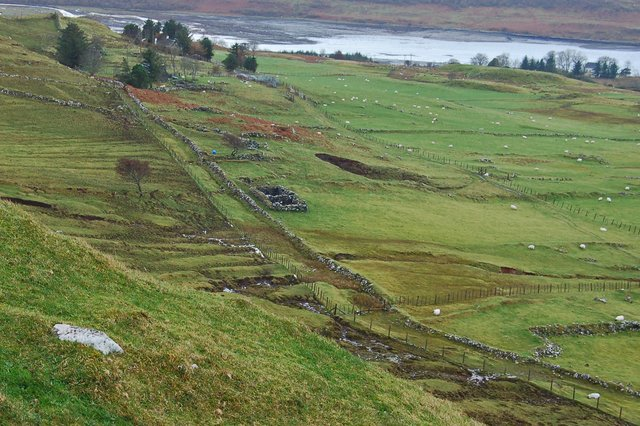
- View towards Eyre, showing ruined buildings

- Location within the Isle of Skye
- OS grid reference: NG414527
- Council area: Highland
- Lieutenancy area: Ross and Cromarty
- Country: Scotland
- Sovereign state: United Kingdom
- Post town: PORTREE
- Postcode district: IV51
- Dialling code: 01470
- Police: Scotland
- Fire: Scottish
- Ambulance: Scottish
- UK Parliament: Inverness, Skye and West Ross-shire
- Scottish Parliament: Ross, Skye and Inverness West

Eyre (Scottish Gaelic: Eighre) is a settlement on the eastern shore of Loch Snizort Beag on the northern coast of Skye in Scotland.

The two Eyre standing stones (Scottish Gaelic: Sornaichean Coir' Fhinn) are situated next to Loch Eyre. It is said that there was once a third stone here, although there is now no trace.
