= Dunan, Skye =

Coordinates: 57.27312°N 5.99081°W

Dunan: Scottish Gaelic: An Dùnan
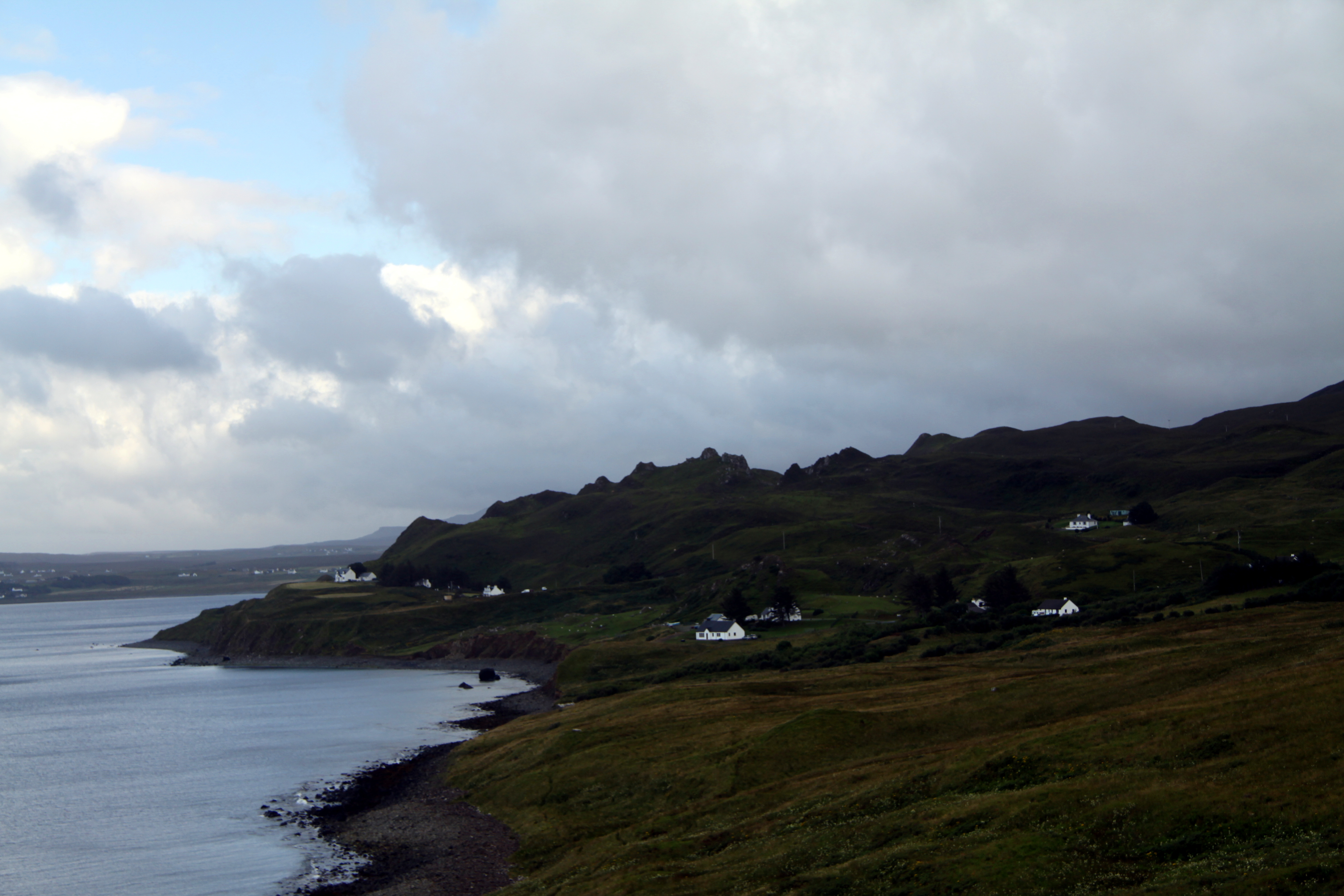
- Dunan is named after the Dùn located there.

- Location within the Isle of Skye
- OS grid reference: NG595273
- Council area: Highland
- Country: Scotland
- Sovereign state: United Kingdom
- Post town: Broadford
- Postcode district: IV49 9
- Police: Scotland
- Fire: Scottish
- Ambulance: Scottish

Dunan (Scottish Gaelic: An Dùnan) is a settlement on the south shore of the sea loch, Loch na Cairidh near Broadford, on the island of Skye in Scotland and is in the council area of Highland.

The village of Luib is less than 1 mile (1.6 kilometres) east of Dunan along the A87 road.
