= Treaslane =

Coordinates: 57.48695°N 6.34769°W

Treaslane: Scottish Gaelic: Triaslann
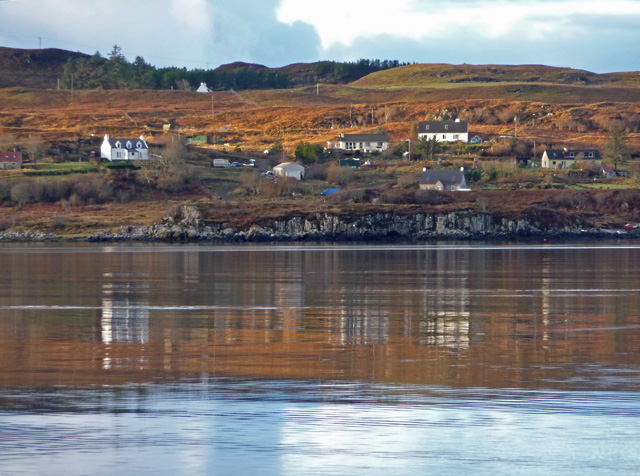
- The township of Treaslane seen across the water of Loch Snizort Beag.

- Location within the Isle of Skye
- OS grid reference: NG395524
- Council area: Highland
- Country: Scotland
- Sovereign state: United Kingdom
- Post town: Portree
- Postcode district: IV51 9
- Police: Scotland
- Fire: Scottish
- Ambulance: Scottish

Treaslane (Scottish Gaelic: Triaslann) is a small remote scattered crofting hamlet on the Isle of Skye, Scotland. It overlooks the western entrance to Loch Treaslane and Loch Snizort Beag to the north.
