= Borve, Skye =

Coordinates: 57.455°N 06.261°W

Borve: Scottish Gaelic: Borbh
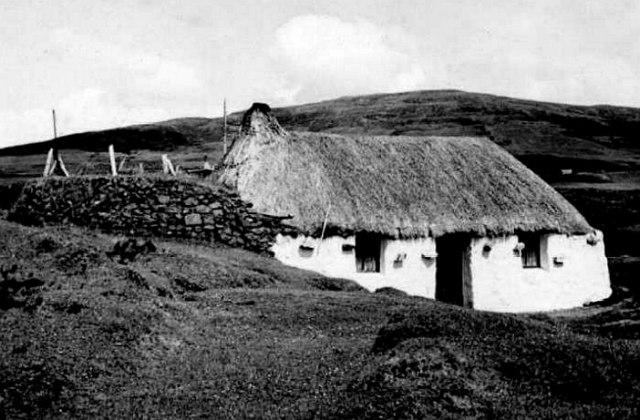
- Cottage at Borve in 1946

- Location within the Isle of Skye
- OS grid reference: NG445485
- Council area: Highland
- Lieutenancy area: Ross and Cromarty
- Country: Scotland
- Sovereign state: United Kingdom
- Post town: PORTREE
- Postcode district: IV51
- Dialling code: 01470
- Police: Scotland
- Fire: Scottish
- Ambulance: Scottish
- UK Parliament: Inverness, Skye and West Ross-shire
- Scottish Parliament: Ross, Skye and Inverness West

Borve or Borbh is a crofting township on the Isle of Skye, Scotland.

== Dun Borve ==
Dun Borve [dùn is 'fort' in Gaelic] is an ancient fort, that was considered a fairy dwelling. When local villagers shouted, The fairies' fort is on fire!, the fairies all fled. The fairies left for good when they found out that they had been tricked.
