= Tomdoun =

Human settlement in Highland, Scotland

Coordinates: 57.06388°N 5.04448°W

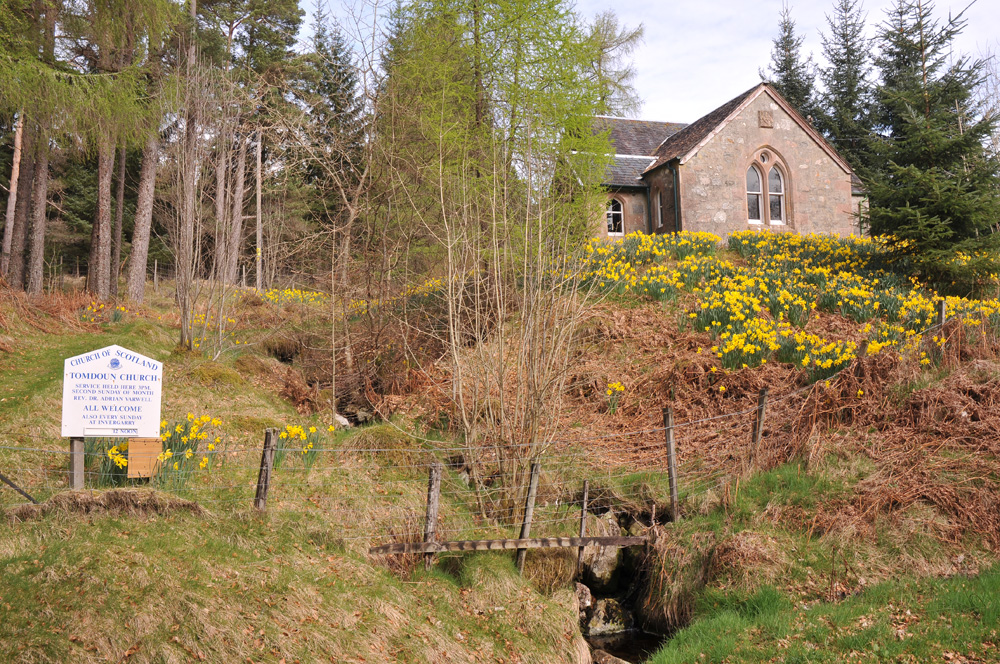
The church building at Tomdoun

Tomdoun (Scottish Gaelic: An Tom Donn) is a settlement on the north side of the River Garry, near the western end of Loch Garry, in Glen Garry in the Highlands of Scotland. The name comes from the Gaelic for "the brown hillock".

Tomdoun was historically situated next to the A87 road, the main route to Skye. This road ran along Glen Garry, before heading north at Tomdoun, over the hills to Glen Loyne and Glen Shiel. But Loch Loyne was dammed in the 1950s as part of a hydro-electric scheme, flooding this road. A new road was built further to the east, around Loch Loyne. Now the only road past Tomdoun is a minor road, heading west to the remote village of Kinloch Hourn.

A prominent building within the settlement is Tomdoun Hotel, built as a lodge for fishermen in 1895. It includes decorative iron brackets supporting its verandah. Nearby is Tomdoun Chapel, which was built in 1865. An extension with gothic windows was added in 1883. Construction of the chapel was funded by the Tomdoun Estate, to serve the needs of visitors to the area and those living in upper Glen Garry. It is built of stone, to a T-shaped floor plan, with a timber roof clad in slates, and internally, the stone walls are unplastered. Services are organised by the Church of Scotland, and occur once a month.

== Bibliography ==
- Mac an Tàilleir, Iain (2003). "Placenames collected by Iain Mac an Tailleir (P–Z)" (PDF). Scottish Parliament. Archived from the original (PDF) on 5 June 2011.
