= Glenmoriston =

River glen in the Scottish Highlands

Coordinates: 57.173°N 4.813°W

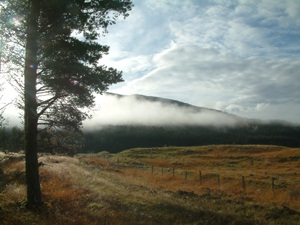
Glenmoriston

Glenmoriston or Glen Moriston (Scottish Gaelic: Gleann Moireasdan) is a river glen in the Scottish Highlands, that runs from Loch Ness, at the village of Invermoriston, westwards to Loch Cluanie, where it meets with Glen Shiel. The A887 and A87 roads pass through Glenmoriston.

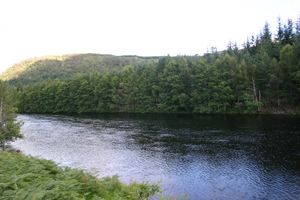
The River Moriston

The Glen is dominated by the River Moriston, which in Gaelic might mean "river of the waterfalls". The river is a big attraction for fishers, but also for birdwatchers who come to see osprey and eagles fishing on the river. The river crashes over waterfalls at Invermoriston into Loch Ness, passing under an original Thomas Telford bridge, built in 1813.

About five miles along the glen from Invermoriston is Loch Dundreggan, "Dundreggan" being of Gaelic origin and meaning "Dragon Haugh". Here the natural force of the river is tapped through a hydro-electric dam, which supplies power to the area. Water is let out of the dam on Tuesdays, making it a popular attraction for white water rafting and canoeing. After a feasibility study in Glen Affric, wild boar were re-introduced by the charity Trees for Life to a large fenced area of the Dundreggan Estate in November 2009.

== Glenmoriston Footprints ==
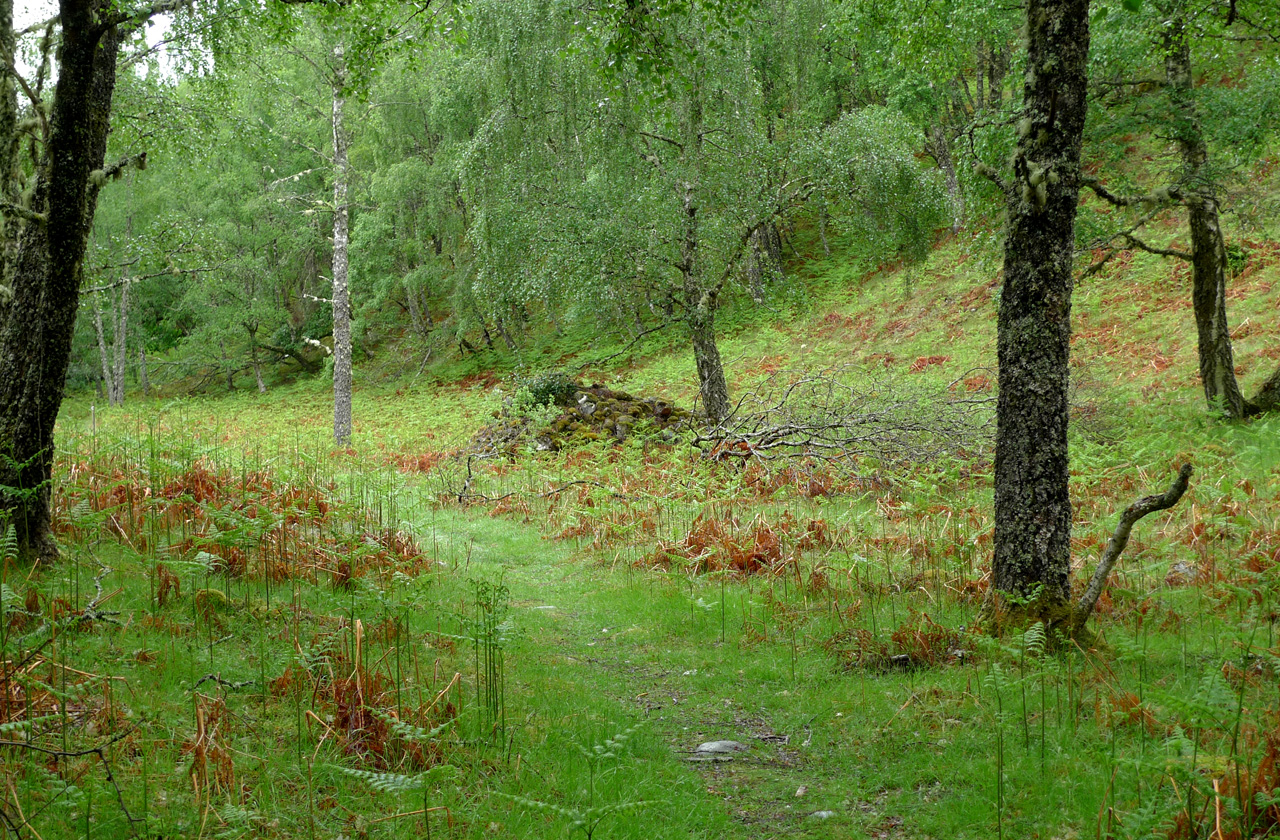
The cairn marks the site of the Glenmoriston Footprints.

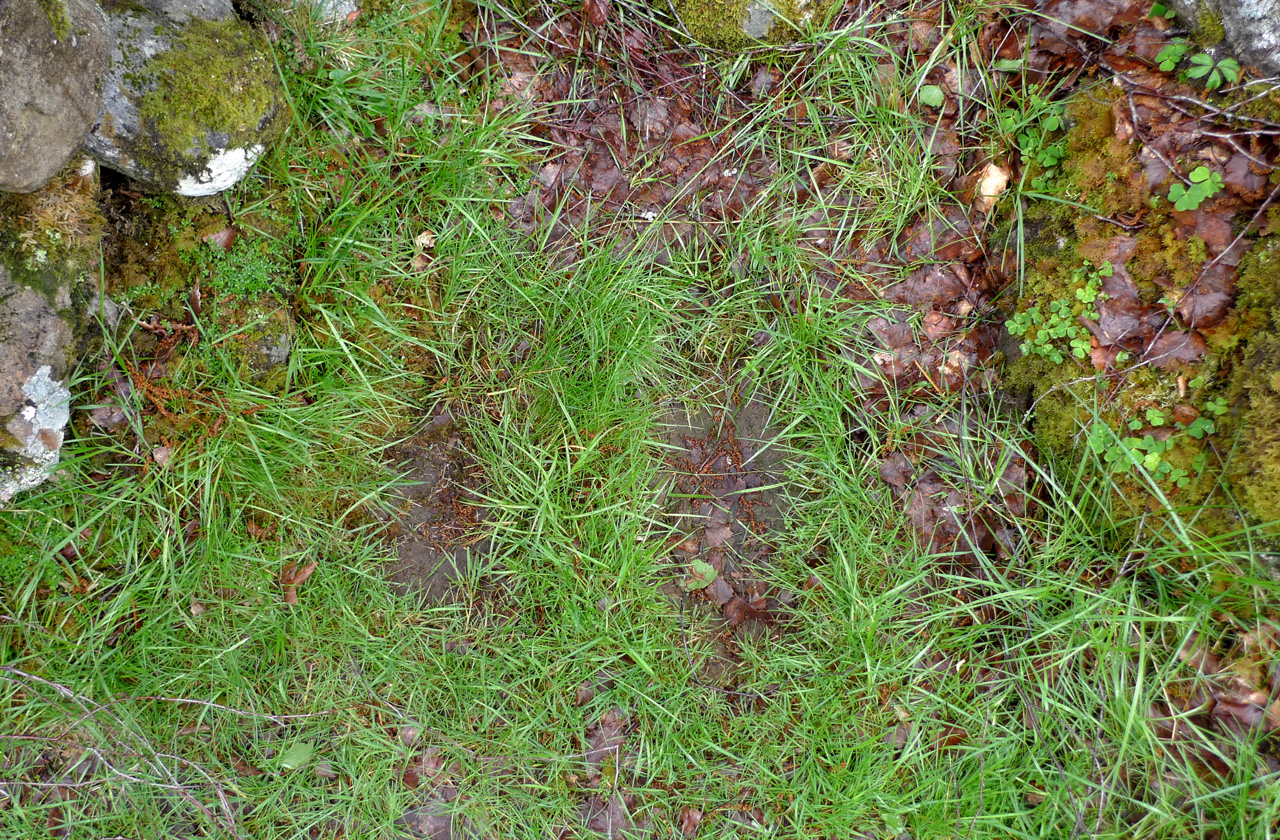
Close-up view of the Glenmoriston Footprints.

Not far east of Torgoyle Bridge are the Glenmoriston Footprints. From the bridge, head towards Invermoriston. About a quarter of a mile beyond a cluster of houses on the right is a short stone wall on the right where the verge widens enough to park a car. Opposite this is a small gate and a path leading in about thirty yards to a stone cairn. Immediately behind this are two "footprints", bare patches of earth about the size and shape of footprints.

They are said to be the footprints of Finlay Munro, otherwise known as the Highland Evangelist, a native of Tain. After a productive ministry on the Isle of Lewis, he made a tour of the southern Highlands during which he preached in Glenmoriston in 1827. His sermon, on the text "Prepare to meet thy God, O Israel" (Amos 4:12), was generally well received but some Catholics from Glengarry heckled him, calling him "a cheat and a liar" Munro is supposed to have closed his Bible and retorted that the ground on which he stood would bear witness to the truth of what he said until the Day of Judgement comes. Thus the marks on the ground are said to be his footprints, where nothing will grow.

== Other history ==
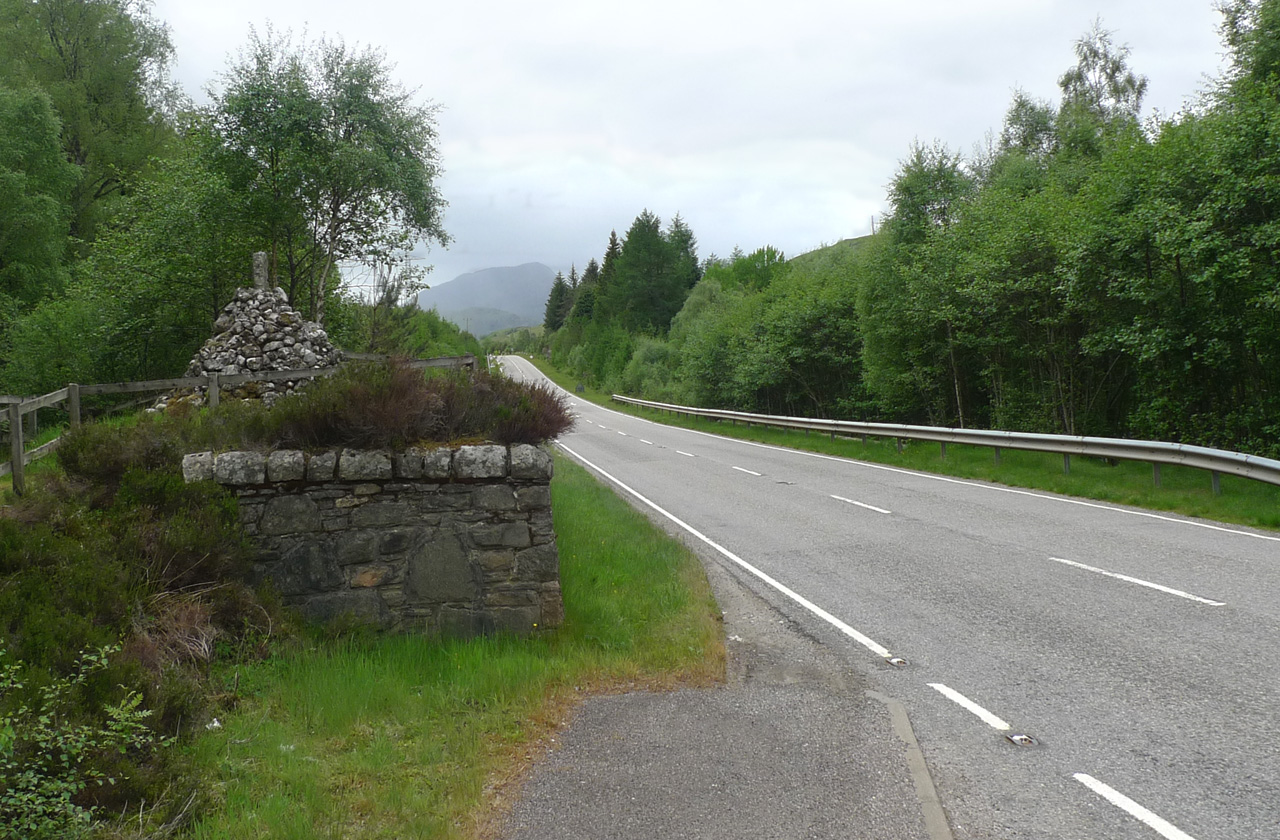
The Roderick Mackenzie Cairn.

Saint Irchard founded a church in Glenoriston at a place where his bell rang of its own accord for the third time. The bell was preserved there for many centuries, and after the church was ruined in the 17th century it remained in the churchyard.

The glen is also steeped in Jacobite history. After the Battle of Culloden in 1746, the pretender to the Scottish throne, Bonnie Prince Charlie escaped to safety through Glenmoriston. Here the Prince took refuge in a cave up in the hills where the River Doe flows down into the glen. He was famously protected by the Seven Men of Glenmoriston, in spite of a £30,000 reward (around £4.2 million or US$6 million in 2016). By the side of the road is Roderick Mackenzie's cairn, a tribute to a loyal supporter of the Stuart Prince who pretended to be Charlie and allowed himself to be captured and killed by the soldiers pursuing the young pretender – giving the real man time to escape to safety. Glenmoriston is commonly misspelled as Glenmorriston especially in history books.

== Census Data ==
Census data from 2001 as applied to the IV63 7 postcode district (Glenmoriston and Invermoriston)

- Population - 264. (Glenmoriston - 102, Invermoriston north of river - 75, Invermoriston south of river 87)
- Born in England - 37% (Highest in the Highlands. Rises to 47% in Glenmoriston)
- Born in Scotland – 55% (Lowest in the Highlands. Decreases to 46% in Glenmoriston)
- Retired - 24.4% (Highest in the Highlands)
- Average age - 45.6 (6th oldest out of 113 postal areas in the Highland region)
- Percentage of households with children - 22% (98th out of 113)
- Percentage of children - 17.5%. (101st out of 113 areas )
- In good health - 68% (99th out of 113 areas)
- Households as second or holiday homes - 58% (2nd highest out of 113)
- Percentage of households rented from council - 4.4% (12th lowest out of 113, and no housing association stock)
- Amount of rented housing decrease 1991-2001 - 50%. (Second worst in the Highlands)

== See also ==
- Achlain
- Grant of Glenmoriston
