= Description of the Western Isles of Scotland =

16th-century Scottish manuscript

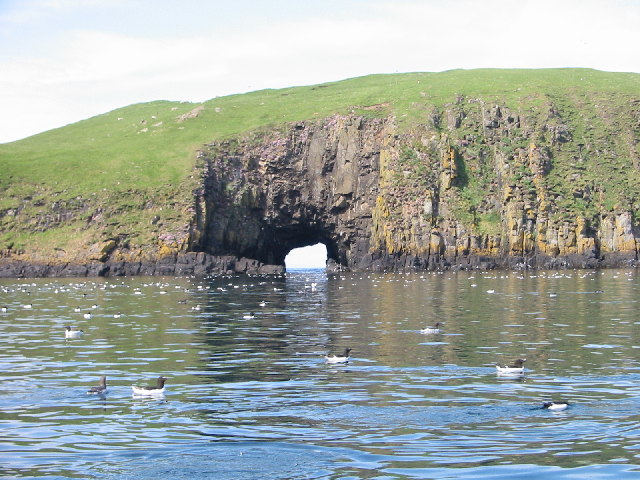
A cave on Garbh Eilean in the Shiant Isles. In 1549, Donald Monro wrote that "through the arch we used to row or sail with our boats, for fear of the horrible break of the sea that is on the outward side of the point". (Note: Monro wrote in the original Scots form: "throw the quhilk Volt we useit to row or sail with aire boats, for feir of the horrible brak of seais that is on the outwart side of the point" (Sibbald MS version) or "through the quilk vylt we use to row ore saill with our bottis, for fear of the horrible breake of the seas that is on the outwar side thereof" (Auld version).)

Description of the Western Isles of Scotland is the oldest known account of the Hebrides and the Islands of the Clyde, two chains of islands off the west coast of Scotland. The author was Donald Monro, a clergyman who used the title of "Dean of the Isles" and who lived through the Scottish Reformation. Monro wrote the original manuscript in 1549, although it was not published in any form until 1582 and was not widely available to the public in its original form until 1774. A more complete version, based on a late 17th-century manuscript written by Sir Robert Sibbald, was first published as late as 1961. Monro wrote in Scots and some of the descriptions are difficult for modern readers to render into English. Although Monro was criticised for publishing folklore and for omitting detail about the affairs of the churches in his diocese, Monro's Description is a valuable historical account and has reappeared in part or in whole in numerous publications, remaining one of the most widely quoted publications about the western islands of Scotland.

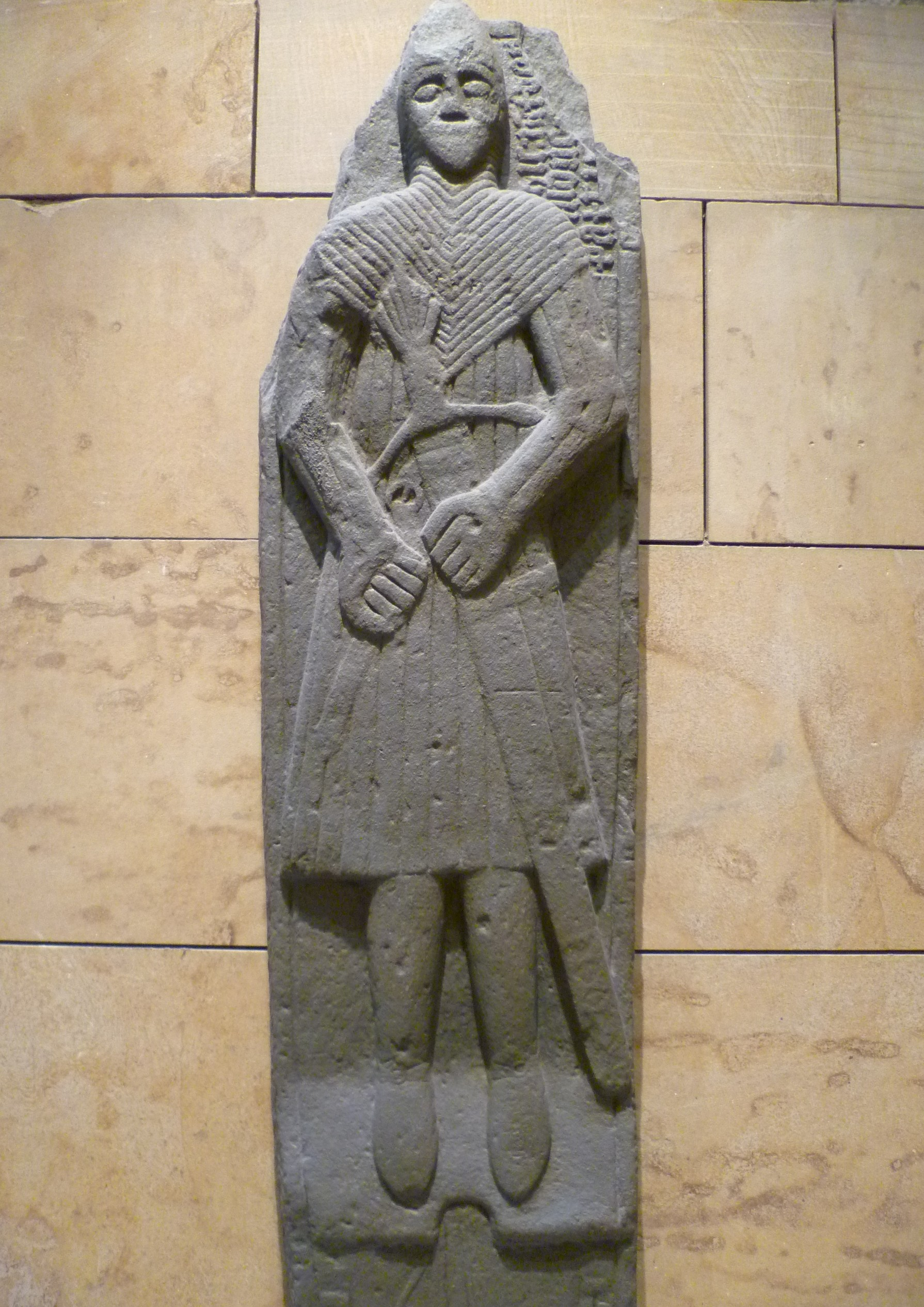
The tomb effigy of Domhnall Mac Gilleasbuig, crown tenant of Finlaggan during the mid 16th century

Monro also wrote a brief description of the five main branches of Clan Donald that existed in his day under the title "The Genealogies Of The Chief Clans Of The Iles", and this work was included when Description was first published as a stand-alone volume in 1805. The Sibbald manuscript also contains details about the "Council of the Isles" that operated from Eilean na Comhairle in Loch Finlaggan on the island of Islay. This is the most detailed extant account of the supreme judiciary body that had existed under the Lordship of the Isles until its demise in the late fifteenth century.

== Author ==
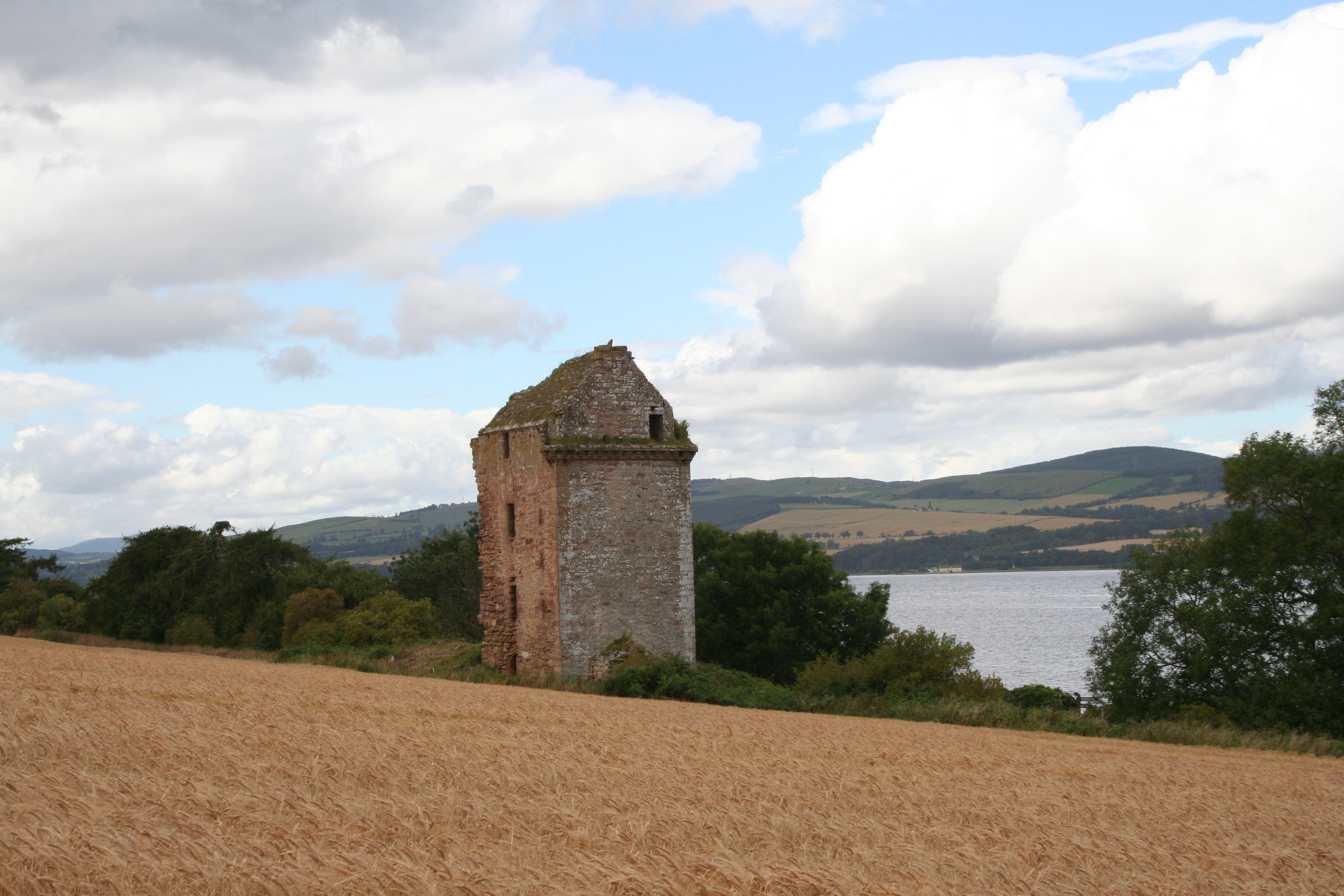
Castle Craig on the Black Isle, with the Cromarty Firth beyond. Donald Monro may have lived here in the 1560s.

Donald Monro was born early in the 16th century, the eldest of the six sons of Alexander Monro of Kiltearn and Janet, daughter of Farquhar Maclean of Dochgarroch. His father was a grandson of George Munro, 10th Baron of Foulis. Donald became the vicar of Snizort and Raasay in 1526, and was nominated to the Archdeaconry of the Isles probably in or shortly after 1549. These were troubled times in the Highlands and Islands, with Domhnall Dubh's attempts to resurrect the Lordship of the Isles only failing on his death in 1545. Partly as a result, the See of the Isles was one of the poorest in Scotland and although Monro lists fourteen islands as belonging to its Bishop, in practice rents were hard to collect. In that year, he visited most of the islands on the west coast of Scotland and wrote his manuscript account of them, together with a brief genealogical account of various branches of Clan Donald. He referred to himself as "High Dean of the Isles" and his position was one of considerable influence although the advancing Reformation added further complication to the political landscape in which he was operating.

In 1560 the new Confession of Faith was adopted and ten dioceses were created anew, with the Isles shared between Ross and Argyll. Monro converted to Protestantism and was admitted to the new ministry for the parish of Kiltearn, to which he later added the adjacent Lemlair and Alness. He is said to have lived at Castle Craig, commuting across the Cromarty Firth to preach on Sundays. At Lammas 1563 he became one of three special Commissioners under the Bishop of Caithness responsible for creating new kirks. The duties were arduous but he retained his position for 12 years, despite occasional criticism by the General Assembly. (Note: Monro came under investigation for his lack of diligence ("he was not so apt to teache as his charge required") and his poor command of Gaelic. The resulting report has not survived and it is assumed he was exonerated.) The last record of him is dated 1574 and it is assumed he had died by 1576 when new ministers were appointed for Kiltearn, Lemlair and Alness. He never married and no extant stone marks his burial at Kiltearn, his written work being his sole monument.

== Previous descriptions ==
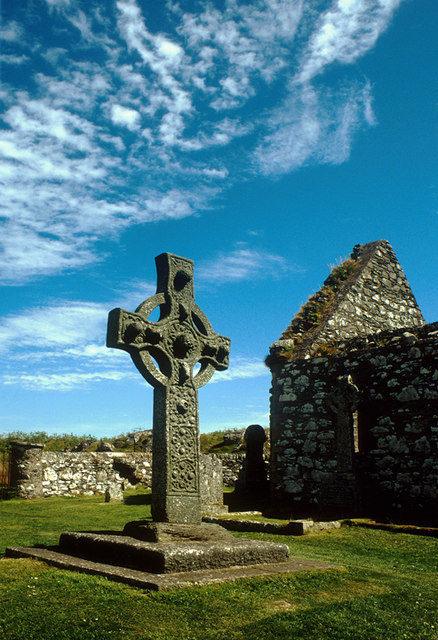
The 8th century Kildalton Cross on Islay, carved when the island was part of Dál Riata.

In or shortly before 83 AD, a traveller called Demetrius of Tarsus related to Plutarch the tale of an expedition to the west coast of Scotland. He stated that it was a gloomy journey amongst uninhabited islands and that he had visited one which was the retreat of holy men. He mentioned neither the druids nor the name of the island. In his Natural History Pliny the Elder states that there are 30 "Hebudes", and makes a separate reference to "Dumna", which Watson (1926) concludes is unequivocally the Outer Hebrides. Writing about 80 years later, in 140–150 AD, Ptolemy, drawing on the earlier naval expeditions of Agricola, also distinguished between the Ebudes, of which he writes there were only five (and thus possibly meaning the Inner Hebrides) and Dumna.

The first written records of native life in the Hebrides begin in the 6th century AD with the founding of the kingdom of Dál Riata. Much of what is known of these times is the product of the monastic sites such as Iona, Lismore, Eigg and Tiree but north of Dál Riata, where the Inner and Outer Hebrides were nominally under Pictish control, the historical record is sparse.

The names of the individual islands reflect a complex linguistic history. The majority are Norse or Gaelic but the roots of some may have a pre-Celtic origin The earliest comprehensive written list of Hebridean island names was undertaken in the 16th century by Monro himself, which in some cases also provides the earliest written form of the island name.

== Publications ==
Monro's work was first published in Latin in 1582. It forms eleven short chapters of George Buchanan's Rerum Scoticarum Historia ("History of Scotland") with all of the islands listed, although with much omission of the detailed island descriptions. The genealogy section was included. In 1603 the portion in Scots relating to the islands was published in Certayne Matters concerning the Realme of Scotland edited by John Monipennie of Pitmilly in the parish of Kingsbarns, Fife. Following Buchanan, this version gives many of the island names in Latin. Thus Monro's "Heddir Iyle" (Heather Isle) is Monipennie's "Ericca". The section was republished in the 1612 Scots Chronicles, in which the acknowledgement of Monro's authorship was omitted.

The original version of Monro's text has been lost, but a copy made in 1642 by Sir James Balfour of Denmilne and Kinnaird, is still extant. Three sections relating to Islay and Lismore, Tiree and Coll, and Harris were omitted, possibly by careless copying. Some 40 years later Sir Robert Sibbald copied out a complete transcript that included sections missing in Balfour. Entitled Description of the Occidental i.e. Western Isles of Scotland by Mr Donald Monro who travelled through the most of them in Anno 1549 it was acquired by the Advocates Library in Edinburgh in 1733. Walter MacFarlane created a third manuscript in 1749, either from a debased original or directly from Balfour as it has the same defects.

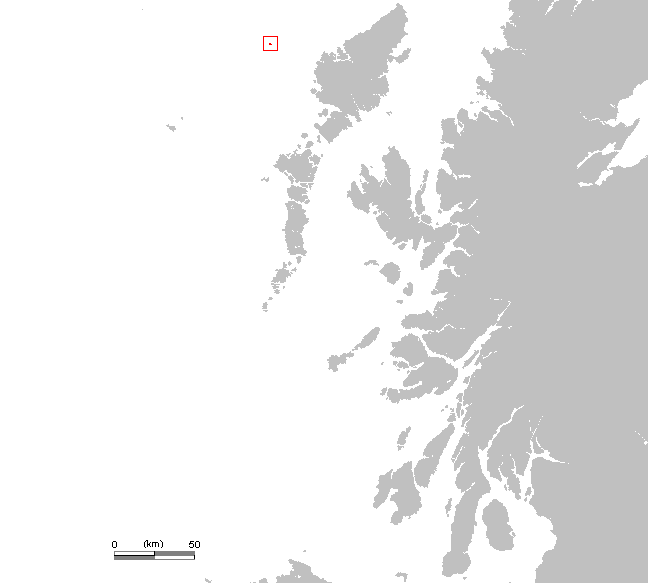
Location of the Flannan Isles relative to the Outer and Inner Hebrides

Monro's work first came to a wider public when the incomplete version of Description was published in 1774 by William Auld of Edinburgh, along with some supplementary writing about the Hebrides. The full title was Description of the Western Isles of Scotland, called Hybrides; by Mr Donald Monro High Dean of the Isles who travelled through the most of them in the year 1549. With his Genealogies of the Chief Clans of the Isles. Description and Genealogies were published together by Archibald Constable of Edinburgh in 1805, which was the first time Monro's work had been published as a stand-alone volume. Miscellanea Scotica, published in Glasgow in 1818 included Description in volume 2 and the Genealogies in volume 4. In this version Description is given the date of 1594 in error. An edition of the 1818 text limited to 250 copies was published by Thomas D. Morison of Glasgow in 1884.

The shorter list was re-published (without the Genealogies) by Peter Hume Brown in his Scotland before 1700, from Contemporary Documents in 1893 and for the first time the text was subject to scrutiny by a professional historian. Walter MacFarlane's text was published by the Scottish History Society in 1908 as part of his Geographical Collections. Eneas Mackay of Stirling included Description and Genealogies in tandem with Martin Martin's 1703 Description of the Western Islands of Scotland in a 1934 publication. R. W. Munro's 1961 re-publication includes the full text of the Sibbald manuscript (MS), a comparison with the shorter Balfour/Auld versions, the recovered text of Monro's description of the Council of the Isles at Finlaggan, George Buchanan's preface to Description in Rerum Scoticarum Historia and scholarly accompanying material.

Some of the discrepancies between the additions are discussed by R. W. Munro. The 1612 version by Monipennie certainly loses both accuracy and detail. For example, his publication has the Flannan Isles "halfe a mile towards the west equinoctiall" from Lewis, whereas the original quoted by the Auld version has them "50 myle in the Occident seas from the coste"— in fact they are 33 kilometres (21 mi) west of Lewis.

== Critiques ==
Buchanan was unstinting in his praise for Monro, describing him as "a pious and diligent man". The latter's reputation was secure until 1824 when the geologist John MacCulloch published a lengthy criticism after visiting the islands several times between 1811 and 1821. MacCulloch decried the lack of detail Monro offered on churches and church buildings, going so far as to suggest that he was ignorant of his own diocese, (Note: MacCulloch wrote: "If he [Monro] had been Verger instead of Dean he could scarcely have been more ignorant of the diocese to which he belonged.") and accusing him of credulity when it came to the recording of folk customs and beliefs. In 1840 the Rev. Alexander Nicolson wrote in the New Statistical Account that "Nothing can show the credulity of the Dean more than his account of the cockles being formed in an embryo on the top of a hill, in a fresh water spring" on Barra. (Note: The spring concerned is probably that near the summit of Ben Eoligarry overlooking Compton Mackenzie's grave at Cille Bharra. It is possible that the high levels of calcium carbonate in the water gave rise to this superstition as it becomes deposited on sand grains.) 120 years later R. W. Munro was more generous, noting that the Dean was generally careful to distinguish between the reporting of folk tales and claims as to their veracity and pointing out that MacCulloch's statement that "it is scarcely possible to recognise one in ten" of Munro's island names was unjustified. In 1893 Hume Brown made the first of several modern attempts to identify them and listed 121 out of the 209 on the Monro list he had access to. Description remains one of the most widely quoted publications about the western islands of Scotland.

== Identity of the islands ==
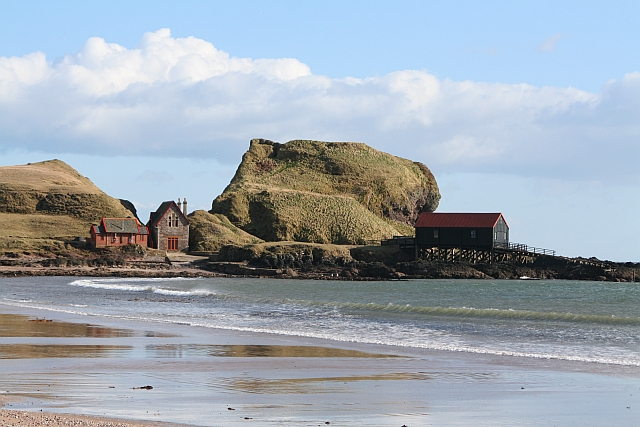
The site of Dunaverty Castle, a possible location for Monro's "Carrik-steach"

Monro originally wrote in Scots, and some of the descriptions are difficult to render into modern English without a working knowledge of this archaic style. Some islands have genuine descriptions, but from time to time there are lists such as:

- Vicreran: Narrest to the iyle of Belnachna layes the small iyle of Vickeran.
- Nagawna: Hard on the iyle Vyckeran layes ther a small iyland, namit in Erische Ellan Nagaruwa.

Unless the modern name is clear from Monro's spelling this can lead to difficulties with identification. The Dean's command of Gaelic was weak and he habitually provides island names phonetically in English rather than using Gaelic spellings. R. W. Munro states that "of the 251 islands listed by Monro, I have been unable to identify 27, and a further 23 cannot be regarded as certain". Munro's belief was that Donald Monro knew the Outer Hebrides and Iona well, but that he may have written about the islands of the Argyll coast from secondhand knowledge as they were in the Diocese of Argyll and not his own Diocese of the Isles. (Note: Only 9 of the 27 islands R. W. Munro could not identify lie north of Islay.) Later authors have made additional identifications, although some quite substantial islands do not appear to be in the lists. (They may of course appear under a different name, the connection to which remains to be established.)

The main numbering system is that of R. W. Munro based on the Sibbald MS. The names and numbers used by the 1774 Auld version are also provided. (Monro himself did not appear to use a numbering system.) The list is presented in geographical sections for ease of use after Haswell-Smith. The Latinised names used by Monniepennie (1612) are also listed along with the modern name, where known, along with various notes where the island's identity is in doubt.

=== Firth of Clyde, Kintyre and the Slate Islands ===
No. (Munro)	Name (Sibbald MS)	No. (Auld)	Name (Auld)	Name (Monipennie)	Modern name	Comments
1	Man	1	Man	Isle of Man	Isle of Man	Now a Crown dependency and not part of Scotland since the 14th century. (Note: Although Man was no longer part of Scotland at the time Monro was writing it retained its ancient ecclesiastical ties to the islands of Scotland through the Diocese of Sodor.)
2	Ellsay	2	Elsay	Ailsay	Ailsa Craig	
3	Aran	3	Arran	Arran	Arran	
4	Flada	4	Flada	Flada	Pladda	With lenition, Plada(igh) yields f- in Gaelic.
5	Molass	5	Molass	Molas	Holy Isle	Modern Gaelic is Eilean MoLaise.
6	Buit	6	Buitt	Isle of Bute	Bute	
7	Inismerog	7	Inche Mernoche	Isle Mernoca	Inchmarnock	
8	Cumbray	8	Cumbra	Great Cambra	Great Cumbrae	
9	Cumbray of the Dais	9	Cumbray Dais	Little Cambra	Little Cumbrae	Gaelic a deas means 'southern'. Little Cumbrae lies to the south of Great Cumbrae.
10	Avoin	10	Avoyn	Porticosa Avona	Sanda	Modern Gaelic is Abhainn, meaning "river", although Munro states the name is derived from the Danish name Havoin, meaning "haven".
–	Carrik-steach	11	Carrith Skeathe		Carraig Sgeith or Dunaverty Castle	Carraig Sgeith is a tiny island at NR656071, and the castle is on a headland 3 kilometres (1.9 mi) to the east. (Note: According to the Auld version, "one the shore of Kintyre, layes ane iyle with a castle ... quherin is ane guid havin for small bottis". Munro (1961) states that this "is indeed the name of a half-submerged rock some distance from the Kintyre shore; but there is no such island on which a castle could be built and no evidence in history of any such castle". He quotes the view of Andrew McKerral recorded in Kintyre in the Seventeenth Century that Monro may have been referring to nearby Dunaverty Castle, which although not on an island is situated on a rocky headland attached to the mainland by a narrow path. It is the only island excluded by Buchanan and is not listed by Monipennie.)
11	Rachlind	12	Rachlaiun	Rachuda	Rathlin Island	Now part of Northern Ireland.
12	Caray	13	Caray	Caraia	Cara	
13	Gighay	14	Gigay	Gigaia	Gigha	
14	Diuray	15	Duray	Jura	Jura	
15	Scarbay	16	Skarbay	Scarba	Scarba	
16	Ellan wellich	17	Veliche	Isle Ballach	Eilean a Bealach	A "mere rock" between Scarba and Jura at NM712065.
17	Gewrastill	18	Gilbrastol	Genistaria	Guirasdeal	A "very little iyle", Guirasdeal is at NM693079. Monipennie has two islands here, the second being called "Gearastilla".
18	Lungay	19	Lungay	Longaia	Lunga	
19	Fidlay chaille	20	Fidlachaille	The "two Fidlais"	Fiola Meadhonach	At high tides the northern tip of Lunga becomes several separate islets with Rubha Fiola to the north, then Fiola Meadhonach, Eilean Ìosal and finally Fiola an Droma closest to Lunga proper.
20	Fidlainrow	21	Fidlavirow	See above	Rubha Fiola	Northern island of the Lunga group. See above.
21	Garvhelach skein	22	Garrowhellach Sheain	The "three Barbais"	Eilean Dubh Beag	It is not clear why R. W. Munro prefers this identification to Garbh Eileach or one of the other Garvellachs. (Note: There are three large islands in the Garvellach group, which might reflect Moniepennie's "three Barbais" and the Sgeiran Dubha rocks are just offshore from Eileach an Naoimh.)
22	Garvhelach na monaobh	23	Garowhillach-Nanronow	See above	Eilean Dubh Mor	It is not clear why R. W. Munro prefers this identification to one of the Garvellach group. See above note.
23	Ellach nanaobh	24	Nanaose	See above	Eileach an Naoimh	"Narrist to this iyle of Garowhellach-Nanronow layes ther a verey little iyle, callit in Erische Eloche Nanaose", although Eileach an Naoimh is much larger than Eilean Dubh Mor.
24	Culbrenyn	25	Culibrenyn	Culbremna	A' Chuli	A' Chuli is the third largest of the Garvellach islands.
25	Dunchonill	26	Dunchonill	Dunum	Dùn Channuill	Dùn Channuill is also one of the Garvellach group
26	Ellan a Mhadi	27	Madie	Coilp or Cuparia	Unidentified	Madie "layes betwixt Lungay, and being callit in Englishe the Wolfiis iyle." Monipennie has two names here and it is not clear how they relate to the other lists. R. W. Munro offers no suggestion for this island's identity. (Note: A derivation of Ulva (see No. 110 Vilua) is from the Old Norse ulvøy meaning "wolf island". The tidal Ulva Islands in Loch Sween at NR727824 are thus a possibility for Madie, "the Wolfiis iyle.")
27	Belnachua	28	Belnachna	Beluahua	Belnahua	
28	Ellan vickeran	29	Vicreran	Vickerana	Eilean Mhic Chiarian	R. W. Munro suggested it might be an unknown islet in Balvicar Bay, Seil but Matheson is in "no doubt" of his identification, which is west of Luing.
29	Ellan Nagavna	30	Nagawnwa	Vitulina	Eilean Gamhna	Eilean Gamhna is in Loch Melfort.
30	Luyng	31	Lunge	Lumga	Luing	
31	Saoill or Seill	32	Seill	Seila	Seil	
32	Sevnay	33	Seunay	Scana	Shuna, Slate Islands	
33	Sklaitt	34	Sklaitt	Sklata	Eilean-a-beithich	This island no longer exists, having been quarried out. (Note: Eilean-a-beithich was quarried for its slate to a depth of 76 metres (249 ft) below sea level leaving only the outer rim of the island. Tipping of the quarry detritus eventually filled up the channel which separated Eilean-a-beithich from Seil, then the quarry came to a catastrophic end when a sea wall gave way.)
34	Ellan Nagvisog	35	Nawissoge	Naguigosa	Unidentified	Conceivably Eilean na(n) Uiseag meaning "island of the larks" but there are no obvious contenders. Another possible explanation is Eilean na Giuthasaich, 'island of the pine wood', but that gets us no closer to identifying the island.
35	Ellan Eisdalf	36	Eisdcalfe	Eisdalsa	Easdale	

Vickeran and Nagvisog are the only two outright unknowns in this section, although there are difficulties with 22–24. If R. W. Munro's identifications are correct Donald Munro excluded the sizeable island of Garbh Eilach, after which the Garvellachs group is named. Insh in the Slate Islands is missing, but the modern name, which means simply "island" is clearly incomplete. Its older names include Eilean nan Caorach and Inis-Capul.

=== Craignish, Taynish, Jura and the Firth of Lorn ===
R. W. Munro was unable to identify several islands in this group, but Youngson (2001) used his local knowledge and research undertaken by Malcolm MacArthur to suggest various small islands offshore from Jura. In a few instances other nearby candidates exist.

No. (Munro)	Name (Sibbald MS)	No. (Auld)	Name (Auld)	Name (Monipennie)	Modern name (Munro)	Modern name (Youngson)	Comments
36	Iniskenzie	37	Inche Kenyth	Skennia	Unidentified	Not mentioned	The name is clearly a variant of "Kenneth's Island" but there are no obvious contenders.
37	Ellan anthian	38	Inchian	Isle Thiania	Unidentified	Shian Island	Shian Island is located north of Loch Tarbert, Jura. There is also Inchaig in Loch Craignish at NM810044. Buchanan offers "the isle called Tyan, from an Herb". (Note: R. W. Munro suggests Buchanan may be referring to the corn marigold, known in old Scots by a variety of names such as yellow gowans. Eilean an dìthein would be "flower island" (dìthean is also the root for a number of related flowers including daisies, ox-eyes and marigolds), but the specific suggestion of a name related to flora is not in any of the extant Scots manuscripts.)
38	Ellan Uderga	39	Uderga	Uderga	Unidentified	"An unnamed island offshore from Glenbatrick"	"Ane uther verey small rock". Glenbatrick is on the south shore of Loch Tarbert, Jura and Youngson's suggestion is at NR516806.
39	King's Ile	40	King's Iyle	King's Island	Eilean Rìgh	Eileanan Gleann Righ	Eilean Rìgh is a much larger and better known island than the tiny islet at NR514819 in Loch Tarbert, Jura proposed by Youngson.
40	Black Ile	41	Black Isle	Duffa	Eilean Dubh	Eilean Dubh a' Chumhainn Mhóir	Eilean Dubh in Loch Craignish is at NM792019. Youngson's suggestion is in Loch Tarbert at NR555816.
41	Kirk Ile	42	Kirke Isle	Island of the Church	Eilean na Cille or Eilean Mor	Eilean an Easbuig	R.W. Munro equivocates: Eilean na Cille is at NM752969 in Loch Craignish and Eilean Mor, which once had a church, is at the mouth of Loch Sween. Blaeu's Y. na heglish at the head of Loch Tarbert is Youngson's Eilean an Easbuig.
42	Ellan Chriarache	43	Chrearache	Triaracha	Unidentified	Eilean Chraoibhe chaorinn	R. W. Munro notes the existence of Eilean Treadhrach, off Oronsay. Youngson's translation is "hazel wood island", and may be another islet in Loch Tarbert at NR581823 or possibly Creagach Chrosgach at NM768033 off the west coast of the Craignish peninsula.
43	Ellan ard	44	Arde	Ardua	Unidentified	Eilean Ard	Eilean Ard is in Loch Tarbert.
44	Ellan Iisall	45	Laich Ile	Humlis	Unidentified	Eilean Iosal, Loch Tarbert	Laich, humilis and ìosal all mean "low".
45	Glass Ellan	46	Greine Ilye	Viridis	Unidentified	Glas Eilean, Sound of Islay	There is also a Glas Eilean in Loch Caolisport, another in the Sound of Islay and an Eilean Glas in Loch Crinan.
46	Fruech Ellan	47	Heddir Iyle	Ericca	Unidentified	Am Fraoch Eilean	Although Monro is almost certainly referring to an Eilean Fraoch, the question is – which one? There is one on the west coast of Luing, another in the Cuan Sound off Torsa, a third at Craobh Haven and another west of the Taynish peninsula at NR712860. This last is near Eilean nan Coinean – see below. There is also Youngson's Am Fraoch Eilean in the Sound of Islay.
47	Ellan na cravich	48	Hasil Iyle	Arboraria	Unidentified	Brosdale Island	Brosdale is in the Sound of Islay. Youngson does not offer an explanation for his identification. The Gaelic craobh relates to trees or shrubs and this is also suggested by "Hasil" and "Arboraria".
48	Ellan na gobhar	49	Gatis Iyles	Capraria	Eilean nan Gabhar	Eilean nan Gabhar	Youngson identifies Eilean nan Gabhar in the Small Isles of Jura at NR538676. R. W. Munro does not specify the location and there is a second Eilean nan Gabhar, south of Eilean Righ at NM791003.
49	Conyngis Ile	50	Conings Ile	Cunicularia	Eilean nan Coinean	Eilean nan Coinean	Youngson is again offering the Small Isles of Jura, but R. W. Munro does not specify the location and there are others at NM776967 west of Taynish or at NM782974 just north of Crinan.
50	Ellan diamhoin	51	Idyle Iyle	Isle of Idlemen	Eilean Diomhain	Eilean Diomhain	One of the Small Isles of Jura.
51	Eisell ellan	52	Eisell	Abridita	Pladda	See below	One of the Small Isles of Jura
52	Ellan Abhridich	53	Uridithe	Uridithe	Eilean Bhride	See below	One of the Small Isles of Jura
53	Lismoir	54	Lismoir	Lismora	Lismore	Not mentioned	

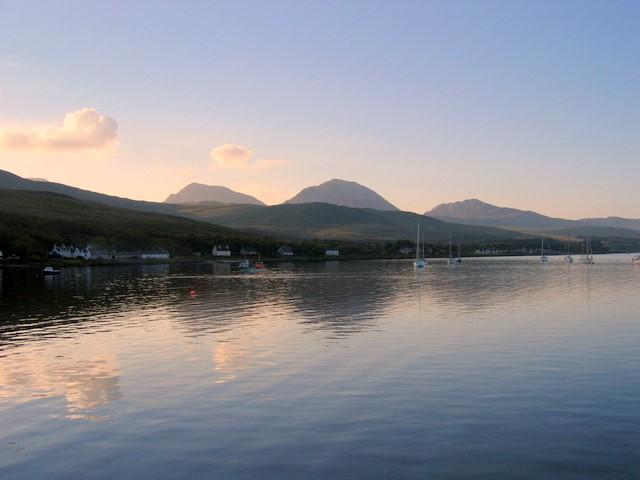
Small Isles Bay, Jura with the Paps of Jura in the distance

With the exception of Lismore, Monro's "descriptions" in this section are little more than a name recorded in English and "Erische" (i.e. Gaelic), which makes definitive identifications hard to achieve. Youngson writes that his names "defeat all attempts to identify with Lorn, and turn out to be near Jura" and that "the islands of the Small Isles Bay and to the south of Jura are all easily identified" (although he does not make the connections explicit) and turns his attention to numbers 39–44 for a detailed analysis. The strength of Youngson's analysis is that whereas most of these names evaded identification by R. W. Munro, he is able to offer candidates for almost all of them. In his interpretation, the islands round Jura are listed anti-clockwise starting at Eilean Mor, compared to Islay whose islands are listed by Monro clockwise (sun gaittis). This would however mean that several large islands are not found anywhere in the Monro list, including Eilean Righ, Island Macaskin and Eilean Mhic Chrion off the Argyll coast. There are also numerous other small islands with these names in this vicinity and it is an odd coincidence that numbers 39–41 all have strong contenders in Loch Craignish, as identified by R. W. Munro.

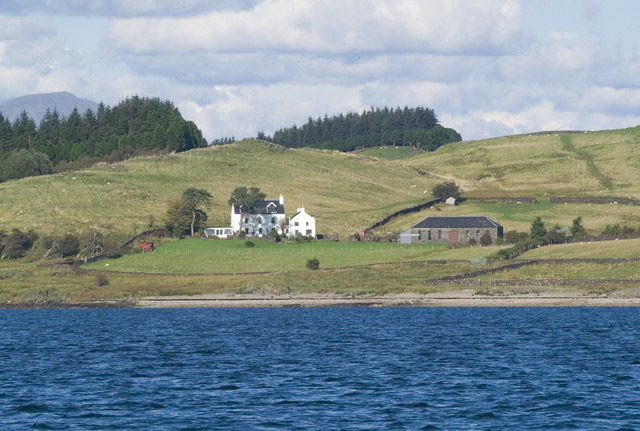
The farm on Shuna

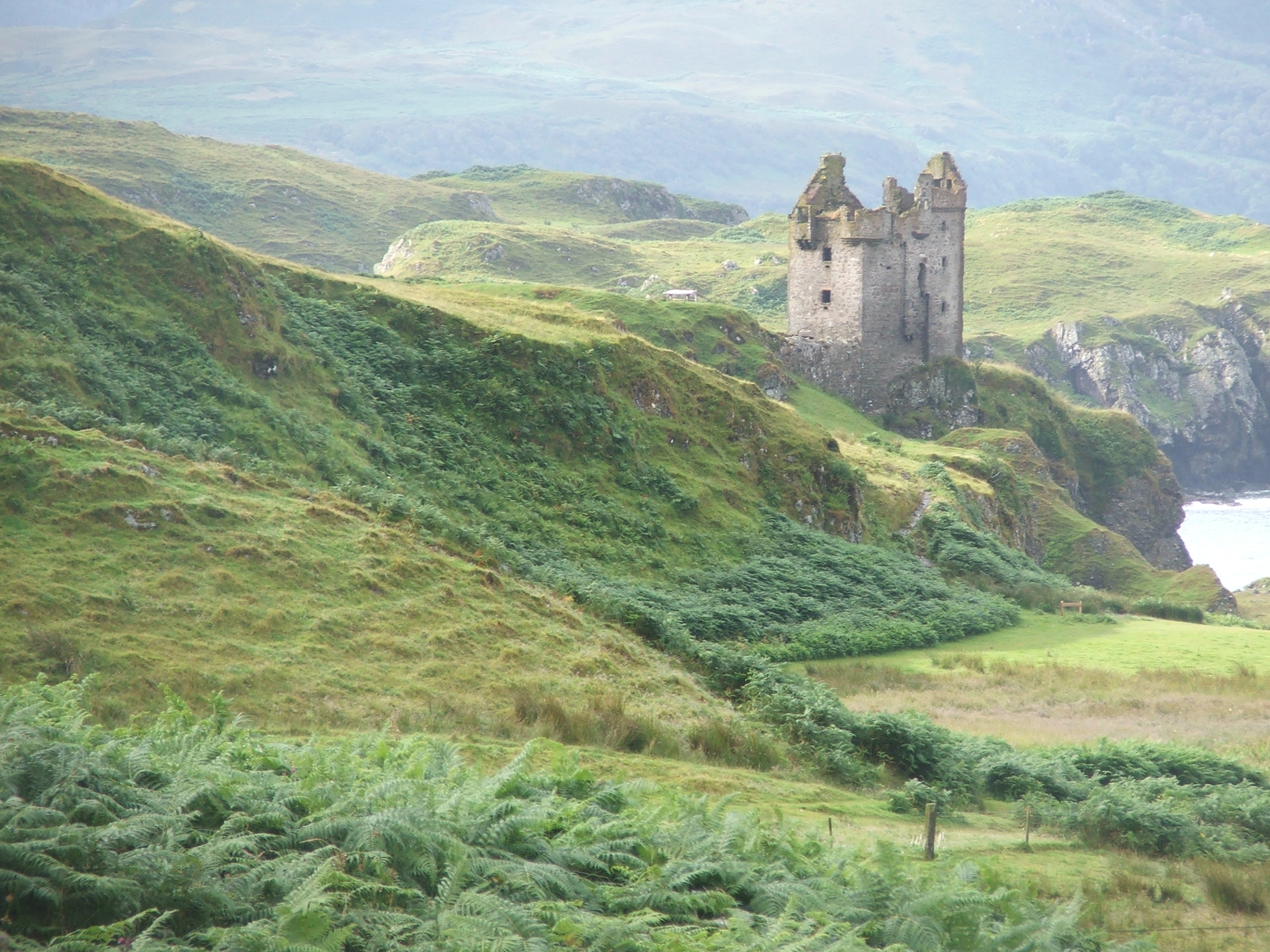
Gylen Castle on Kerrera. The island has "gude fertile fruitfull land" according to Monro.

Youngson does not refer to the section below, which is also missing in its entirety from the Auld and Moniepennie publications.

No. (Munro)	Name (Sibbald MS)	Modern name	Comments
54	Scheip Ile	Eilean nan Caorach	Located in Loch Linnhe
55	Suina	Shuna	
56	Ferray Ile	Inn Island?	Just north of the Lismore jetty
57	Garbh Ellan	Eilean Dubh?	There are numerous islands called Garbh Eilean in Scotland. R. W. Munro's identification is from Bleau's atlas.
58	Ellan Cloich	Eilean na Cloich	Located near Lismore.
59	Flada	Pladda Island	R. W. Munro's index mistakenly relists Pladda, Jura, but there is a Pladda, Lismore as well.
60	Grezay	Creag Island	Located off Lismore
61	Ellan Moir	Eilean nan Gamhna?	
62	Ardiasgar	Unidentified	Translates as "the fisherman's height".
63	Musadill	Eilean Musdile	
64	Berneray	Bernera	
65	Ellan Inhologasgyr	Eilean Loch Oscair	Located off Lismore
66	Ellan drynachai	Eilean Droineach	The description "quhair habitation of Bischops and Nobles were in auld times" fits its neighbour Eilean Ramsay much better.
67	Ransay	Eilean Ramsay	Located off Lismore
68	Ellan Bhellnagobhan	Eilean Balnagowan	Located off Shuna
69	Kerveray	Kerrera	

=== Islay ===
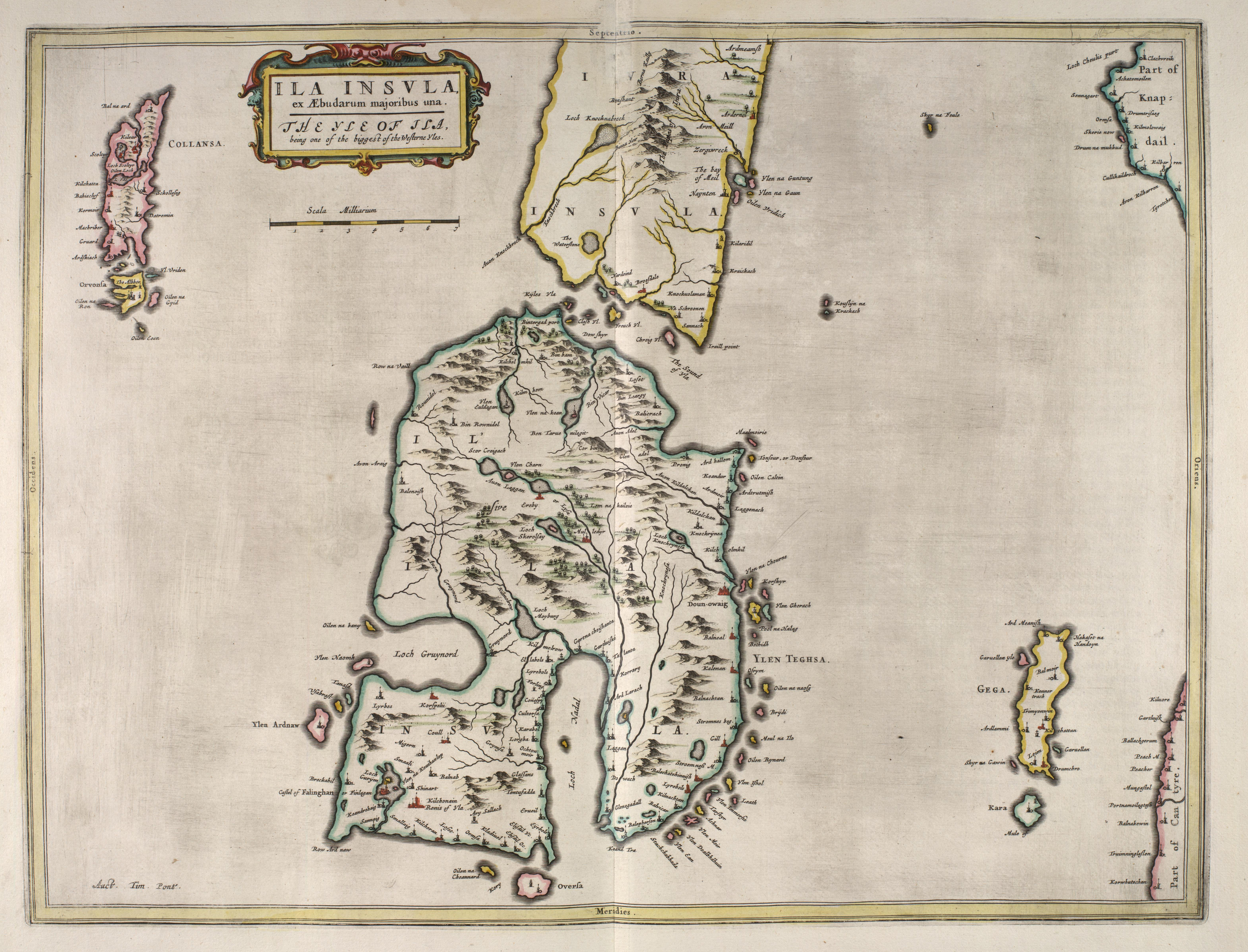
Johan Blaeu's 1654 atlas of "Ila Insula"

Monro states "Her begin to circkell Iyla, sune gaittis aboute with litle iyles." The percentage of islands listed is high and must include several very small islets or skerries. This comprehensive listing contrasts with the omission of various larger islands, including a few that are inhabited, in the Outer Hebrides. There are many correspondences between Timothy Pont's map of Islay published by Johan Blaeu (Atlas of Scotland No. 139) and Buchanan's version of Monro's list. It is possible Pont knew of Monro's work and added a few islets on this basis and the correspondence with modern maps and names is not clear in some instances. Some of the linguistic connections between names are also obscure. For example, the Sibbald MS No. 72 is "Hessil" is also "Ellan Natravie" in the Auld version, which names hints at a pronunciation of the Gaelic for "beach" yet Monipennie has "Colurna" and R. W. Munro identifies the island as possibly being Eilean Craobhach.

No. (Munro)	Name (Sibbald MS)	No. (Auld)	Name (Auld)	Name (Monipennie)	Modern name	Comments
70	Ila	55	Ila	Yla	Islay	
71	Ellan charn	56	Earne Isle	See note	Am Fraoch Eilean	The relationship of the names is explained by R. W. Munro with reference to Buchanan's text and the ruins of Claig Castle. (Note: "At the mouth of Kyle Ila, betwixt it and Duray, lyes ane ile, callit in Erische Leid Ellan Charne, in English the iyle of Earne". Only Am Fraoch Eilean, Brosdale Island and Glas Eilean fit the geography exactly. Am Fraoch Eilean means "heather island" but R. W. Munro quotes Buchanan's version—inter Ilam & Iuram sita est insula parua a cumulo lapidum cognominata— as evidence, noting that in 1772 Thomas Pennant was told of the prior existence of a MacDonald castle on the island, the ruins of which he believes gave rise to the description. Monipennie's translation of Buchanan is "Betwixt Ila and Jura lyes a little island, taking the name from a cairne of stones". There is an Eilean a' Chùirn further south, cùirn being the genitive of càrn (stone) which R. W. Munro does not refer to and he dismisses an islet with a similar name near Eigg. Matheson suggests Ellan charn may be Brosdale Island, which "appears on an old map as Chreig Yl.?".)
72	Hessil Isle	57	Hessil Iyle	Colurna	Eilean Craobhach?	The Auld version has "callit in Erish the Leid Ellan Natravie" but "callit Ellan na caltin" in the Sibbald MS. Calltainn, hessil and colurna are respectively Gaelic, Scots and Latin for "hazel" and Craobhach means "pertaining to trees".
73	Mullinoris Ile	58	Mulmoryris Iyle	Mulvoris	Eilean Mhic Mhaolmhoire	
74	Ellan Osrum	59	Ofrum	Ossuna	Outram	
75	Brydis Iyle	60	Brydes Iyle	Brigidana	Eilean Bhride	At NR463481.
76	Corsker	61	Cors Ker	Corskera	Corr Sgeir	Korskyr in Blaeu's atlas west of Dounowaig.
77	Ellan Isall	62	Eisilache	Low island	Iseanach Mòr?	Ìosal and ìseal both mean "low" but Iseanach suggests a different root.
78	Ellan Imersga	63	Imerska	Imersga	Eilean Imersay	
79	Ellan Nabeathi	64	Bethey	Beathia	Unidentified	Blaeu has Bethidh in this general location.
80	Ellan teggsay	65	Tisgay	Texa	Texa	Blaeu's Ylen Teghsa.
81	Scheips Iyle	66	Scheipis Iyle	Ovicularia	Eilean nan Caorach	
82	Myresnyppis Iyle	67	Myresnypes Iyle	Noasiga	Unidentified	"By the Erishe namit Ellan na Naoske". Eilean na Naosg would translate as Snipe or Fieldfare Island.
83	Ellan Rinard	68	Ness Poynte Iyle	Vinarda	Unidentified	"The yle at the west poynt", it is also mentioned by Monro when he describes Islay. Conceivably a poetic reference to Islay itself – Eilean (nan) Rinn Àrd(a) – would be "the island of tall R(h)inns".
84	Liach Ellan	69	Lyart Iyle	Cava	Unidentified	Located off Port nan Gallan, The Oa. There is another tiny Eilean Liath near Kilchiaran Bay, west of the Rhinns. The relationship of Cava to Liach Ellan is not clear.
85	Tarskeray	70	Tairskeray	Tarsheria	Tarr Sgeir	The Ordnance Survey do not appear to name R. W. Munro's identification.
86	Auchnarra	71	Achnarra	Auchnarra	Unidentified	Blaeu offers Achnar, which is cognate with the Gaelic for "field".
87	Ellan moir	72	Grait Iyle	The great island	Eileanan Mòra	Located near the Mull of Oa. Blaeu has Ylen Moir.
88	Ellan deallach dune	73	The Iyle of the Man's Figure	the island made like a man	Eilean Dealbh Duine	West of The Oa and south of Eileanan Mòra.
89	Ellan Ian	74	Jhone's Iyle	The isle of John	Eilean Eoin	Located in Port nan Gallan, The Oa.
90	Ellan Stagbadis	75	Starbeades	Slakebadis	Stac Bheatais	West of The Oa near Eilean Dealbh Duine. Blaeu has Stackchabhada near The Oa.
91	Oversay	76	Onersay	Oversa	Orsay	
92	Keanichis Ile	77	Merchands Iyle	The Marchants island	Eilean Mhic Coinnich	"Callit by the Erische Ellan Kenyth".
93	Usabrast	78	Usabrast	Usabrasta	Unidentified	Frenchman's Rocks, one of the few contenders in this area, lie just north of Eilean Mhic Coinnich between it and Eilean an Tannais-sgeir.
94	Ellan Tanest	79	Tanefte	Tanasta	Eilean an Tannais-sgeir	At NR188639.
95	Ellean Nefe	80	Nese	Nesa	Nave Island	"Beside the entresse of Lochgrunord".
96	Webstaris Ile	81	Vebster	The Weavers island	Unidentified	"Callit by the Erische themselves Ellan Nabaney". (Note: The Na Badagan rocks lie just off Ardnave Point near Nave Island, and south of Port Ellen between Sgeir Phlocach and Sgeir nan Crùban is a narrows called Bealach Wabina.)

=== Colonsay and Mull ===
No. (Munro)	Name (Sibbald MS)	No. (Auld)	Name (Auld)	Name (Monipennie)	Modern name	Comments
97	Orvansay	82	Ornansay	Ornansa	Oronsay	
98	Ellan na muk	83	Ellan Namuche	Swines island	Eilean Ghaoideamal	"Half ane myle lang".
99	Colvansay	84	Colnansay	Coluansa	Colonsay	
100	Mule	85	Mull	Mule	Mull	
101	Eilean challmain	86	The Dow Iyle	Columbaria	Eilean Challmain	Eilean a' Chalmain is southwest of Erraid.
102	Erray	87	Erray	Era	Erraid	
103	Saint Colms Ile	88	Colmkill	Island of Sanct Colme	Iona	
104	Soa	89	Soa	Soa	Soa Island	
105	Ellan namban	90	Naban	Isle of Women	Eilean nam Ban	
106	Ellan murudhain	91	Moroan	Rudana	Eilean Annraidh?	At the northern tip of Iona.
107	Ellan Reryng	92	Reringe	Bernira	Rèidh Eilean?	Suggestion by Hume Brown and appears on Bleau's map as a large island west of Iona.
108	Iniskenzie	93	Inche Kenzie	Skennia	Inch Kenneth	
109	Eorsay	94	Eorsay	Frosa	Eorsa	

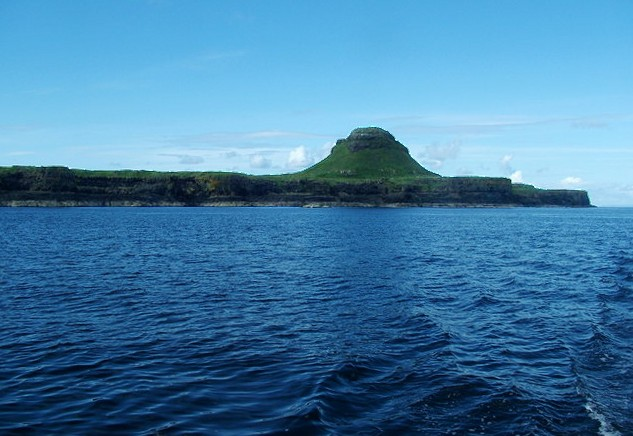
The distinctive outline of Bac Mòr, also known as the "Dutchman's Cap"

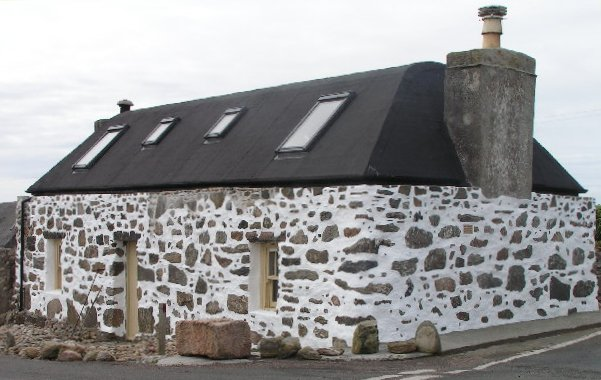
Cottage on Tiree

Here the shorter Auld version has another missing passage. After Frosa (94) Monipennie states that "all their isles are subject to Sanct Colme's abbey".

No. (Munro)	Name (Sibbald MS)	Name (Monipennie)	Modern name	Comments
110	Ulvay	Vilua	Ulva	"five miles of length".
111	Colvansay	Toluansa	Little Colonsay	
112	Gomatra	Gomatra	Gometra	"about 300 paces from this island"
113	Stafay	Staffæ	Staffa	Monipennie has "four mile southward, lye the two Staffæ both full of havening places". There is but one Staffa and by modern standards the anchorages are inadequate.
114	Kerniborg moir and Kerniborg beg	the two Kerimburgæ	Cairn na Burgh Mòr and Cairn na Burgh Beag	
115	Ellan na monadh		Fladda, Treshnish Isles	Monipennie has "One mile from them lyes an island, the whole earth is blacke, whereof the people make peates for their fire".
116	Lungay	Longa	Lunga, Treshnish Isles	
117	Bak	Bacha	Bac Mòr	Bac Beag is also a possibility
118	Thiridh	Tiria	Tiree	
119	Gunna	Sunna	Gunna	
120	Coll	Colla	Coll	

Re Staffa above, it is a small island and in Monro's day it had not achieved its later fame, which did not occur until its late 18th century "discovery". The Auld version joins Sibbald here again and Moniepennie adds Mekle Viridis and Little Viridis to the list.

No. (Munro)	Name (Sibbald MS)	No. (Auld)	Name (Auld)	Name (Monipennie)	Modern name	Comments
121	Calf	95	Calfa	Culsa	Calve Island	"Upon the narrest coste of Mull layes ane iyle callit Calfe, ane myle of lenthe, full of woods, with ane sufficient raid for shipes, perteyning to M'Gillayne of Doward."
122	Glass Ellan moir and Glass Ellan beg	96	The Glasse Iles	Glassæ	Glas Eileanan	Glas Eileanan is just off Rubha an Ridire. R. W. Munro also mentions Eileanan Glass further up the Sound of Mull at NM596450
123	Ellan Ardan rider	97	Ardin Rider	Arden Eider	Eilean Rubha an Ridire	A small isle at NM724405 close to Glas Eileanan.
124	Ellan amhadi	98	Ellan Madie	Luparia or "Wolfe island"	Eilean a' Mhadaidh, Loch Don	
125	Ellan moir	99	Ellan Moir	A great isle	Eilean Mòr, Lochbuie	"Upon the shore of Mull, lyes ane ile, callit by the Erishe Ellan-moir, guid for store and for fishing, pertening to M'Gillayne of Lochbuy."

=== Small Isles ===
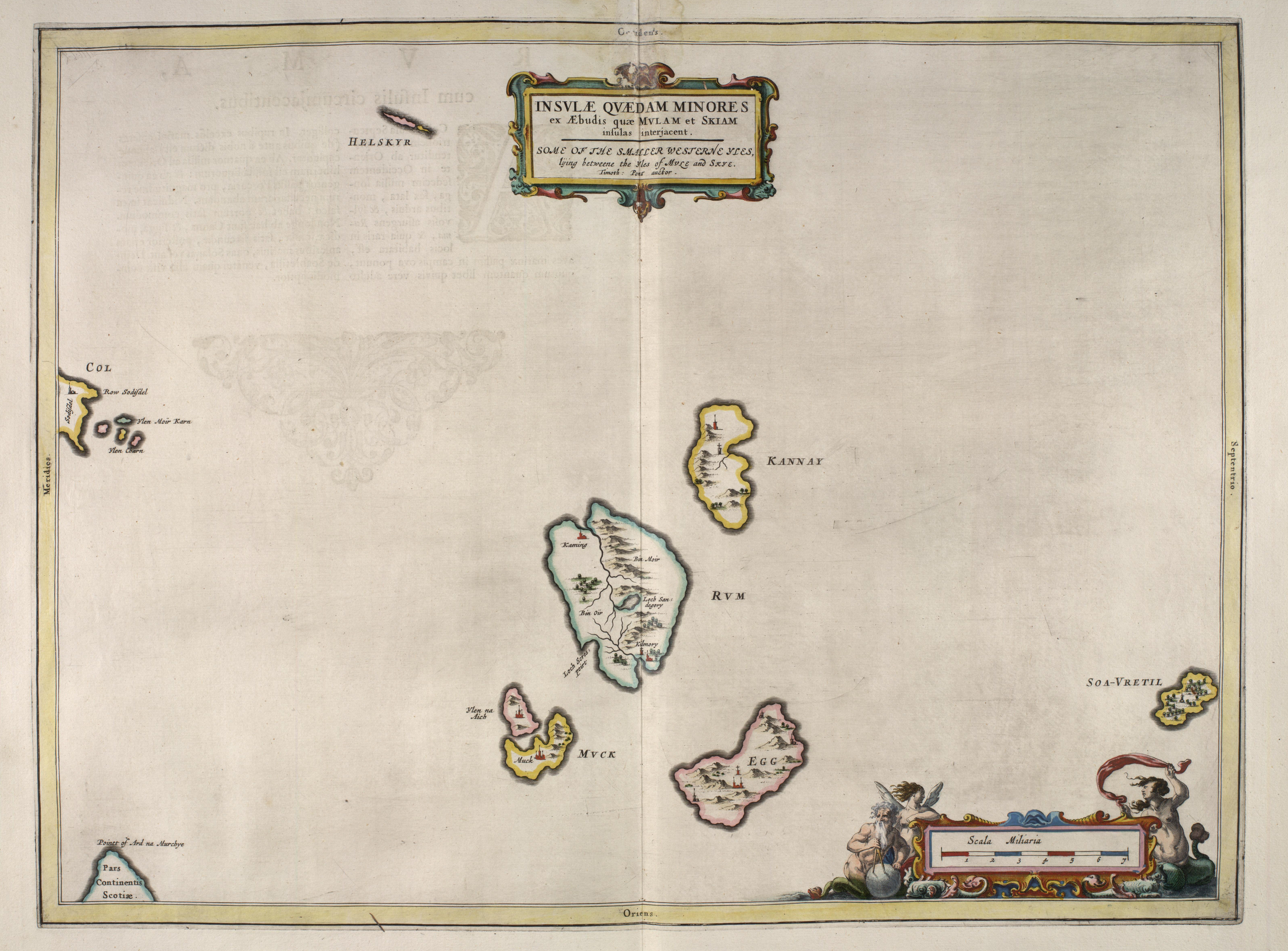
Blaeu's 1654 Atlas of Scotland – The Small Isles

No. (Munro)	Name (Sibbald MS)	No. (Auld)	Name (Auld)	Name (Monipennie)	Modern name	Comments
126	Rum	100	Ronin	Ruma	Rùm	
127	Ellan na neach	101	The Horse Iyle	Horse island	Eilean nan Each	Off Muck
128	Ellan na muk	102	Swynes Ile	Swine island	Muck	
129	Cannay	103	Kannay	Canna	Canna	
130	Egge	104	Egga	Egga	Eigg	

=== Skye ===
No. (Munro)	Name (Sibbald MS)	No. (Auld)	Name (Auld)	Name (Monipennie)	Modern name	Comments
131	Soabretill	105	Soa Urettil	Soabrittella	Soay	Blaeu's atlas also uses the Auld name.
132	Sky	106	Sky	Skye	Skye	
133	Orandsay	107	Oransay	Oronsa	Ornsay	"At the west syde of Sleit lyes ane callit Oransay, ane myle lange" Ornsay is east of Sleat and not of this size.
134	Ellan Naguyneyne	108	Nagoyneyne	Cunicularia	Eilean a' Mhàil	"Fornent Loche Alshe lyes ane iyle, callit in Erishe Ellan Nagoyneyne, that is to say, Cunings ile", i.e. "rabbit island". Hume Brown identified this as MacKenzie Island but R. W. Munro was unable to place it. Matheson offers Eilean a' Mhàil, which was known as Eilean nan Gillean in the 19th century. However, Roy's military map of 1755 shows Eilean Ban in Loch Alsh as Id. Gilain.
135	Pabay	109	Pabay	Paba	Pabay	
136	Scalpay	110	Scalpay	Scalpa	Scalpay	
137	Crowling	111	Crowling	Crulinga	Crowlin Islands	
138	Raarsay	112	Raarsay	Raorsa	Raasay	
139	Ronay	113	Ronay	Rona	South Rona	
140	Ellan Gerloch	114	Ellan Gearlochie	Gerloch	Longa Island	
141	Fladay	115	Fladday	Flada	Staffin Island	Also known as Fladdaidh.
142	Ellan Tuylmen	116	Tuilin	Euilmena	Tulm Island	
143	Orandsay	118	Cransay	Oronsa	Oronsay, Loch Bracadale	
144	Bwya moir	119	Buyamoire	Great Bina	Wiay	
145-52	Unnamed islands	120-26	–	Unnamed islands		Evidence from Buchanan and Pont's maps suggest that nos 145–9 were in Loch Bracadale and 150–2 in Loch Dunvegan.
153	Ellan Isa	127	Isay	Isa	Isay	Monipennie adds "beside it is Ouia".
154	Ellan Askerin	128	Askerin	Askerma	Ascrib Islands	
155	Ellan Lindill	129	Lindill	Lindella	Eilean Mor, Lyndale Point	In Loch Snizort at NG362573.

No 117 is an additional but unnamed island in Auld. "Four myle of sea fra this ile Tuilin, northwart, lyes an ile callit -----."

=== Barra and the Uists ===
John Lorne Campbell (1936) states that Monro "apparently had visited Barra, but it is clear that he writes of the smaller islands from hearsay alone". Nos 156–64 are also known as the Bishop's Isles. Monro does not treat Benbecula, South Uist and North Uist as separate islands. Under Ywst he states: "and in the north syde of this there is ane parochin callit Buchagla, [Benbecula] perteining to the said Clandonald. At the north end thereof the sea cuts the countrey againe, and that cutting of the sea is called Careynesse, and benorth this countrey is called Kenehnache of Ywst, that is in Englishe, the north head of Ywst."

No. (Munro)	Name (Sibbald MS)	No. (Auld)	Name (Auld)	Name (Monipennie)	Modern name	Comments
156	Lingay	130	Lingay	Linga	Lingeigh	
157	Gigarmen	131	Gigarun	Gigarmena	Greanamul	According to Campbell (1936) Hume Brown made this identification in his 1893 publication Scotland before 1700.
158	Berneray	132	Berneray	Benera	Barra Head	
159	Megalay	133	Megaly	Megela	Mingulay	
160	Pabay	134	Pabay	Paua	Pabbay, Barra	
161	Fladay	135	Fladay	Flada	Flodday near Vatersay	
162	Scarpay na mult	136	Scarpnamutt	Scarpa	Muldoanich	Monipennie adds "Vernecum" here. Edward MacQueen suggested Lianamul in 1794.
163	Sanderay	137	Sanderay	Sandera	Sandray	
164	Vatersay	138	Wattersay	Vatersa	Vatersay	
165	Barray	139	Barray	Barra	Barra	
166	Orbandsay	140	Orvansay	Oronsa	Orosay	
167	Ellan nahaonchaorach	141	Nahacharrach	Onia	Unidentified (Note: Not identified in R. W. Munro's index, but not listed by him as unidentified either.)	"In Englishe the Sheipes ile, ane little ile full of gerssing and store, perteining to M'Neill of Barray." "Not known" according to Campbell, but conceivably Fiaraidh, which means "grass" or "pasture" island and which Campbell assigns to 177.
168	Ellan nahakersait	142	Nahakersait	Hakerseta	Heilen	"Not known" by Campbell. The names looks like a corruption of na h-acarsaid, "of the anchorage", and Munro probably refers to Sheileam/Healam in the bay of "An Acarsaid" at the end of the Bruairnis peninsula on Barra.
169	Garvlanga	143	Garnlanga	Garnlanga	Garbh Lingeigh	Also identified by Campbell.
170	Fladay	144	Flada	Flada	Flodday, Sound of Barra	
171	Buyabeg	145	Bwyabeg	Little Buya	Eilean Sheumais	"Not known" according to Campbell, but R. W. Munro states that an earlier name for Eilean Sheumais (James's Island) was Fuidheidh Beag and that it was renamed "after a fugitive from the mainland".
172	Buya moir	146	Bywa-moir	Great Buya	Fuiay	"Not known" according to Campbell.
173	Hay	147	Hay	Haya	Unidentified	Fuiay (No 172 above) according to Campbell.
174	Hellisay	148	Hettesay	Hell sea	Hellisay	
175	Gigay	149	Gigay	Gigaia	Gighay	
176	Lingay	150	Lingay	Lingaia	Lingay	There are other contenders: Lingeigh and Garbh Lingeigh off Fuiay.
177	Feray	151	Feray	Foraia	Fiaraidh	
178	Fuday	152	Fuday	Fudaia	Fuday	
179	Eriskay	153	Eriskeray	Eriscaia	Eriskay	
180	Vyist	154	Ywst	Vistus	Uist	
181	Blank	155				
182	Helsker na caillach	156	Helsker Nagaillon	Helsther Wetularum	Monach Isles	In the 18th century Lady Grange was kidnapped and conveyed to the Monach Isles. She wrote that "I was in great miserie in the Husker".
183	Haifsker	157	Haysker	Haneskera	Haskeir	"Northwast fra this Kentnache of Ywst, be twalve myle of sea".
184	Hirta	158	Hirta	Hirta	Hirta	
185	Valay	159	Valay	Velaia	Vallay	

Numerous islands are missing from the lists including Ronay, Stuley, Baleshare, Kirkibost and Calvay.

=== Lewis and Harris and the north west ===
Lewis and Harris is the largest of Scotland's islands and the third largest in the British Isles, after Great Britain and Ireland. It incorporates Lewis in the north and Harris in the south, both of which are frequently referred to as individual islands, although they are joined by a land border. The island does not have a common name in either English or Gaelic and is referred to as "Lewis and Harris", "Lewis with Harris", "Harris with Lewis" etc. The first sub-section contains another group not listed by the 1774 Auld version. The ordering of the Sibbald MS is in places slightly different from Moniepennie's and the correspondence is not always obvious. The former's numbers 197 and 201 appear to have been omitted completely in the latter.

==== Harris ====
No. (Munro)	Name (Sibbald MS)	No. (Auld)	Name (Auld)	Name (Monipennie)	Modern name	Comments
186	Soa	160	Soa	Soa	Shillay	Identified by Hume Brown although R. W. Munro lists it as "doubtful". Matheson suggests Boreray.
187	Stroma			Stroma	Stromay	In the Sound of Harris but closer to North Uist.
188	Pabay			Pabaia	Pabbay, Harris	
189	Berneray			Barneraia	Berneray, North Uist	
190	Enisay			Emsaia	Ensay, Outer Hebrides	
191	Keligir			Kelligira	Killegray	
192	Sagha beg			Little Saga	Saghaigh Beag	
193	Sagha moir			Great Saga	Saghaigh Mòr	
194	Hermodray			Harmodra	Hermetray	
195	Scarvay			Scaria	Sgarabhaigh	
196	Grya			Grialinga	Groaigh	
197	Linga			Missing	"Linga"	Lingay lies near Killegray in the Sound of Harris but there is an islet just to the north called Langay or Langaigh.
198	Gillinsay			Cillinsa	Gilsay	
199	Heyia			Hea	Tahay?	
200	Hoya			Hoia	Unidentified	R. W. Munro notes the peninsula of Hoe Beg.
201	Ferelay			Missing	Spuir?	This little skerry is at NF853843between Pabbay and Boreray. Heather's chart of 1804 shows "Fure Isle" here although Monro seemed to believe the isle was inhabited.
202	Soya Beg			Little Soa	Soay Beag	
203	Soya moir	185	Soya-Moir	Great Soa	Soay Mòr	
204	Ellan Isay	186	Ellan IIsa	Isa	Ìosaigh	"Isay" located off Harris, according to R. W. Munro.
205	Seuna beg	187	Senna-Beg	Little Seuna	Unidentified	
206	Seuna moir	188	Senna-Moir	Great Seuna	Unidentified	
207	Tarandsay	189	Tarandsay	Taransa	Taransay	
208	Slegain	190	Sleyein	Slegana	Sleicham?	Not identified by R. W. Munro who notes that Blaeu puts the island between Taransay and Scarpa. Sleicham lies off Ensay.
209	Tuemen	191	Tivein	Tuemon	Unidentified	Blaeu places the island near Slegain above.
210	Scarpe	192	Scarpe	Scarpa	Scarp	
211	Flavain	193	Seven Haley Iles	Flannæ	Flannan Isles	

==== Loch Ròg ====
No. (Munro)	Name (Sibbald MS)	No. (Auld)	Name (Auld)	Name (Monipennie)	Modern name	Comments
212	Garvellan	194	Garvellan	Garn-Ellan	Seanna Chnoc	Named Garvilan I. in a coastal chart of 1804.
213	Lambay	195	Lambay	Lamba	Unidentified	Possibly Campaigh
214	Fladay	196	Fladay	Flada	Flodaigh, Outer Loch Ròg	There is also Flodaigh, Lewis and a Fladaigh at NA993152 near Scarp.
215	Keallasay	197	Kealnsay	Kellasa	Cealasaigh	
216	Berneray beg	198	Berneray-Beg	Little Bernera	Little Bernera	
217	Berneray moir	199	Berneray-Moir	Great Bernera	Great Bernera	
218	Kirtay	200	Kertay	Kirta	Eilean Chearstaidh	
219	Bwya beg	201	Buya-beg	Little Bina	Fuaigh Beag	
220	Buya moir	202	Buya-Moir	Great Bina	Fuaigh Mòr	
221	Vexay	203	Vaxay	Vexaia	Vacsay	
222	Pabay	204	Pabay	Pabaia	Pabaigh Mòr	
223	Sigrame moir na goneyne	205	Sigrain-moir-Nagoinein	Great Sigrama	Siaram Mòr	Siaram Mòr is south of Pabaigh Mòr. Monipennie adds "Cunicularia" here – the ungarbled Gaelic would be Siaram Mòr na(n) Coinean.
224	Sigram beg	206	Sigrain-Beg	Little Sigrama	Siaram Beag	

Some small outer islands are missing including Bearasaigh and Cealasaigh.

==== Lewis ====
No. (Munro)	Name (Sibbald MS)	No. (Auld)	Name (Auld)	Name (Monipennie)	Modern name	Comments
225	Pigmeis Ile	161	The Pigmies Ile	island of the Pigmeis	The "dry island" of Luchraban	This story about an island inhabited by diminutive people that has "ane little kirk in it of ther awn handey wark" was not unravelled until the early 20th century by William Cook and tales of the "little men of Luchruban" remained current in the 1960s.
226	Ellan Fabill	162	Fabill	Fabilla	Eilean Mòr Phabail	At NB524302.
227	Ellan Adam	163	Adain	Adams island	Eilean a' Chrotaich?	Located off Point, the Gaelic name means the "humpacked (person's) island" but the relationship between the two names is not clear.
228	Ellan na Nuan	164	Na-naun	Lambe island	Eilean nan Uan	At NB459307.
229	Ellan Huilmen	165	Huiture	Hulmetia	Eilean Thuilm	"Betwixt this ile and Stornaway ther lyes Ellan Huiture". Eilean Thuilm appears as "Holm Island" on old maps and tulm/tuilm is the Gaelic form of the Norse holm.
230	Ellan Viccowill	166	Vic-couill	Viccoilla	Eilean na Gobhail	Not identified by R. W. Munro (Note: Not identified in R. W. Munro's index, but not listed by him as unidentified either.) but by Matheson, who lists various Gaelic names for this islet in Stornoway harbour.
231	Havreray	167	Haleuray	Hana	Tannaraidh	Monipennie adds "Rera" here, possibly intending "Hana Rera" as one island.
232	Laxay	168	Laxay	Laxa	Eilean Mòr Lacasaidh, Loch Erisort	
233	Ere	169	Err	Era	Eire?	"Which is in English Irland". Not identified by R. W. Munro, but this islet is at NF996798 just north of Grodhaigh in the Sound of Harris.
234	Ellan Cholmkle	170	St. Colmes Ile	Dove island	Eilean Chaluim Chille	
235	Torray	171	Tooray	Tora	Eilean Thoraidh	At NB419204 near Eilean Chaluim Chille.
236	Ellan Iffurt	172	Ellan Hurte	Affurta	Eilean Liubhaird	
237	Scalpay of Harray	173	Scalpay of Harray	Scalpa	Scalpay, Outer Hebrides	
238	Fladay	174	Fladay	Flada	Fladda-chuain	"Towards the northeist frae [Scalpay] ... be 20 myle of sea".
239	Senta	175	Senta	Senta	Garbh Eilean	In Gaelic the Shiant Isles are Na h-Eileanan Seunta. The description of the strong currents through the Toll a' Roimh natural arch is vivid.
240	Senchastle	176	Senchastle	Old Castle	Eilean Mhuire	Seann Chaisteal (old castle) is the name of the southwestern promontory on Eilean Mhuire.

Various islands are apparently missing including Seaforth Island, Eilean Mhealasta and Boreray.

==== North Highland coast ====
No. (Munro)	Name (Sibbald MS)	No. (Auld)	Name (Auld)	Name (Monipennie)	Modern name	Comments
241	Ellan Ew	177	Ellan Ew	Ew	Isle of Ewe	
242	Ellan Gruinord	178	Gruynorde	Grumorta	Gruinard	
243	Ellan na clerache	179	Na-clerache	Priests island	Priest Island	
244	Ellan af vill	180	Afuil	Afulla	Unidentified	Bottle Island (Eilean a' Bhotail in Gaelic) is a possibility as is nearby Eilean Dubh.
245	Havreray moir	181	Hawrarymoir	Great Habrera	Tanera Mòr	
246	Havreray beg	182	Hawrarybeg	Little Habrera	Tanera Beag	
247	Ellan na neach	183	Naneache	Horse isle	Horse Island	
248	Ellan Mertark	184	Mertarye	Marta Ika	Isle Martin	

Missing are Isle Ristol, Handa and Oldany Island.

==== Lewis and Harris ====
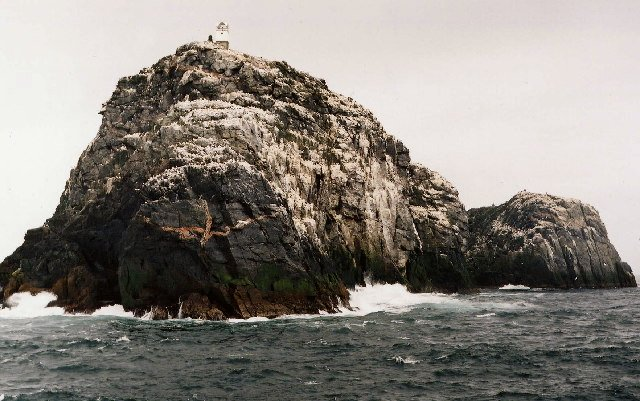
Sula Sgeir from the south west. Donald Monro wrote that the men of Ness sailed there in their small craft to "fetche hame thair boatful of dry wild fowls", a tradition that continues to this day.

No. (Munro)	Name (Sibbald MS)	No. (Auld)	Name (Auld)	Name (Monipennie)	Modern name	Comments
249	Haray and Leozus	207	Harrey	Hary and Lewis	Lewis and Harris	
250	Ronay	208	Ronay	Rona	North Rona	
251	Swilskeray	209	Suilskeray	Suilkeraia	Sula Sgeir	

== Genealogies ==
Monro provides a brief description of the five main branches of Clan Donald that existed in his day under the title "Heir Followis The Genealogies Of The Chief Clans Of The Iles".

The arms of Macdonald of Macdonald

- Clan Macdonald of Sleat whose chief in Monro's day was Donald Gormeson, a descendant of Hugh of Sleat.
- Clan Eanmore of Dunnyveg.
- Clan Ragnald led by John Moidartach.
- Clan-Ean of Ardnamorachin
- The House of Alexander Carrath, described by Monro as "the fairest hared man (as they say) of aney that ever was".

Clan Donald are descendants of Somerled and Monro claims that in earlier days the House was known as "Clan Gothofred".

This Somerle wes the sone of Gillebryde M'Gilleadam, name Vic Sella, Vic Mearshaighe, Vic Swyffine, Vic Malgheussa, Vic Eacime, Vic Gothefred, fra quhome they were called at that time Clan Gothofred, that is, Clan Gotheray in Hybers Leid, and they were very grate men in that tymes zeire. (Translation from Scots: This Somerled was the son of Gillebryde M'Gilleadam, son of Sella, son of Mearshaighe, son of Swyffine, son of Malgheussa, son of Eacime, son of Gothefred, from whom they were called at that time Clan Gothofred, that is, Clan Gotheray in the Gaelic language, and they were very great men in those times.)

The name "Gofraid" also appears in numerous other versions of Somerled's ancestry.

== Council of the Isles ==
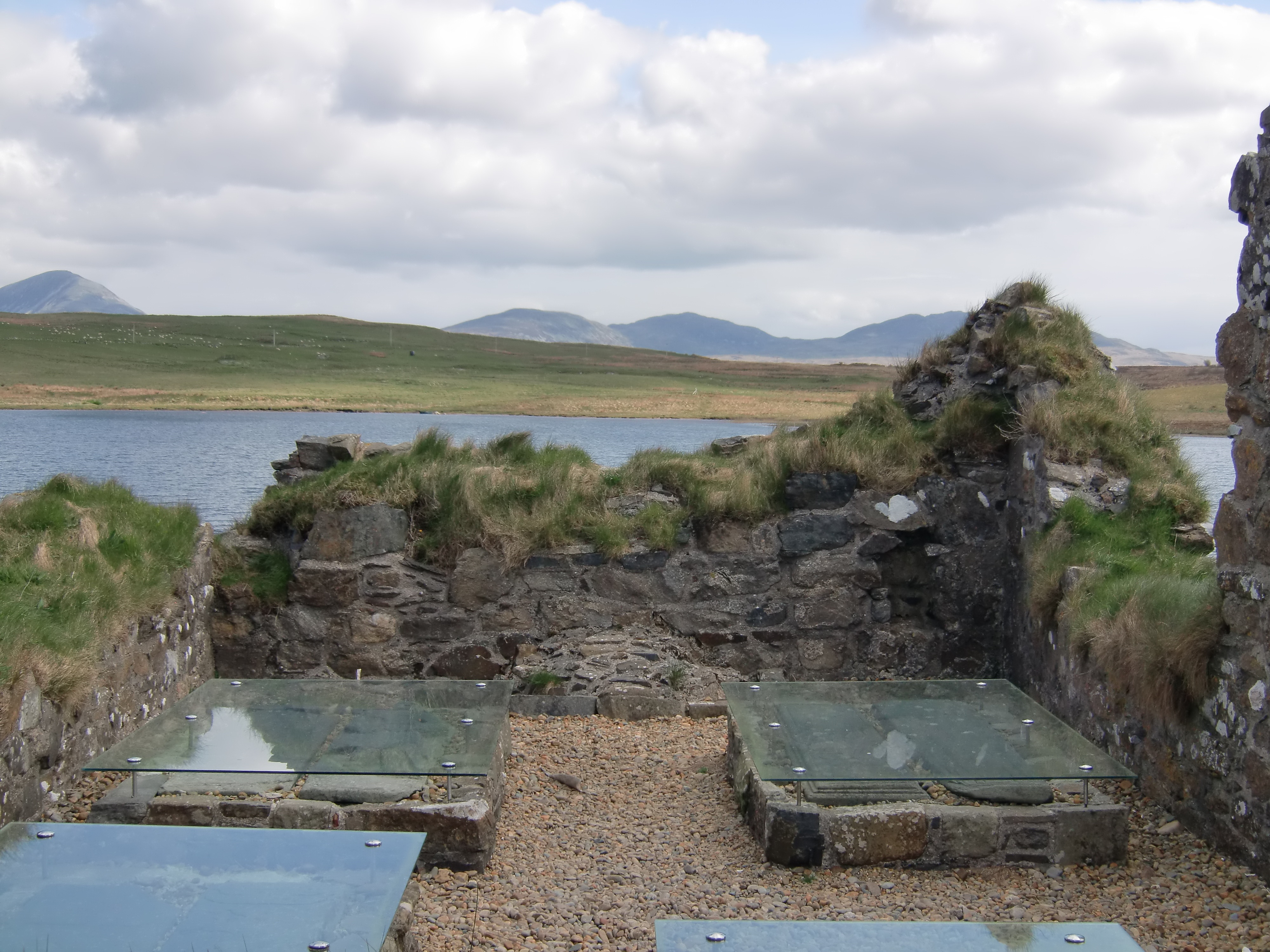
Ruins on Eilean Mòr in Loch Finlaggan, looking toward the Paps of Jura and the hills of Islay

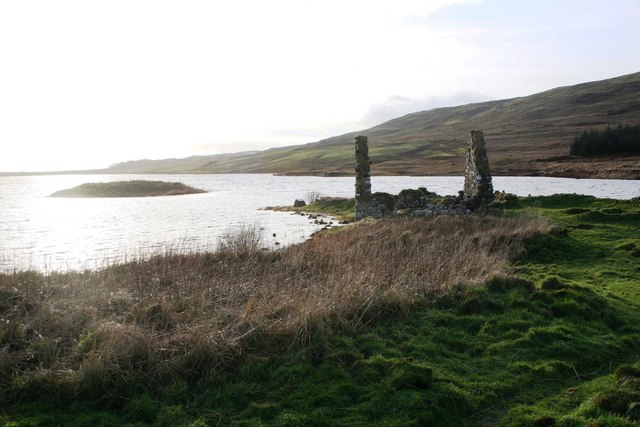
Eilean na Comhairle - "Council Island" – lies just offshore from the ruins on Eilean Mòr Finlaggan, Islay

Finlaggan was the site of the court of the Buachaille nan Eileanan, the chief of Clan Donald. Eilean na Comhairle (council island) was originally a timber framed crannog constructed in the 1st century BC, just offshore from Eilean Mòr (large island), which was known as the Island of St Findlugán during the Medieval period.

The Auld version of Monro's text has under No 55 "Ila" only "Ellan Forlagan, in the middle of Ila, ane faire iyle in fresche water" as the concluding sentence and there is no specific reference to the Council. Monipennie provides a slightly longer text as a translation from Buchanan about the government of the Isles that operated from Eilean na Comhairle at Finlaggan. However the Sibbald MS has a much longer description, the earliest and most detailed of the three main texts that have persisted into the modern era. (Note: The other two extant descriptions of the Council can be found in Macdonald, Hugh (c. 1628) History of the Macdonalds and in Martin, Martin (c. 1695) A Description of The Western Islands Of Scotland.) Monro describes the membership of the Council, comprising "14 of the Iles best Barons" and its role as the supreme court of justice.

After the forfeiture of the Lordship of the Isles by James IV in 1493 Finlaggan's buildings were razed and its coronation stone destroyed to discourage any attempts at restoration of the Lordship. The Council was briefly revived during Domhnall Dubh's 1545 rebellion, just four years before Monro's text was written. The barons listed by Monro are:

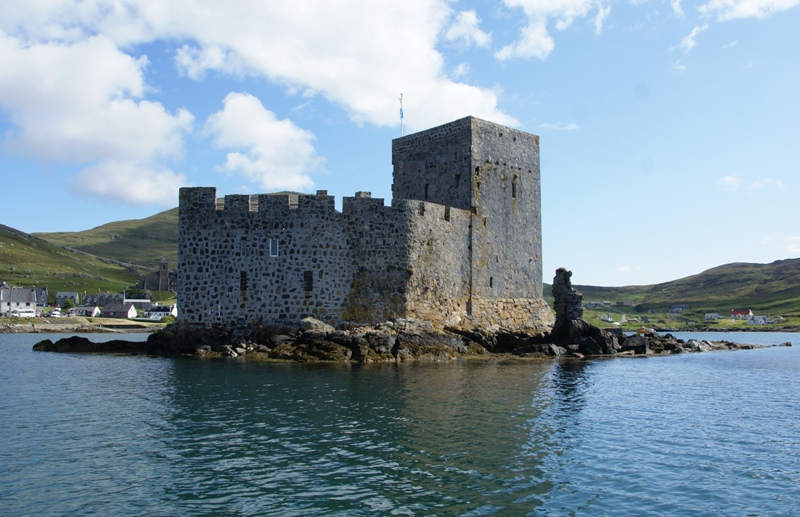
Kisimul Castle, the seat of MacNeil of Barra

- Maclean of Duart
- Maclean of Lochbuie
- MacLeod of Harris
- MacLeod of Lewis
- Mackinnon
- McNaie
- MacNeill of Gigha
- MacNeil of Barra
- MacDonald of Dunnyveg
- MacDonald of Ardnamurchan
- Clanranald
- MacDonald of Lochaber
- Bishop of the Isles
- Abbot of Iona

The identity of Clan McNaie is unknown.

== See also ==
- Kingdom of the Isles
