= Flodday =

There are many small islands in Scotland called Flodday (Scots Gaelic: Flodaigh) or similar and this list provides a guide to their location. The derivation of the name is from the Old Norse floti meaning "raft" or "float". The similar island names Fladda and Flotta have Norse flatr as their first element and mean "flat island". Usage is not always consistent in external sources.

== Outer Hebrides ==
=== Lewis near Great Bernera/Beàrnaraigh ===
- Flodaigh, Lewis (NB105335), in inner Loch Roag, Lewis, opposite the hamlet of Cairisiadar.
- Flodaigh, Outer Loch Ròg (NB120415), in outer Loch Roag, west of the islet of Hairsgeir and south of Bearasaigh.

=== Harris ===
- Fladday (NA993152), between Scarp and Harris.

=== North Uist ===
- Flodday, Loch Maddy (NF940695), in Loch Maddy
- Flodaigh Beag (Floddaybeg) (NF917580) (the Gaelic meaning is "small raft island") south east of North Uist.
- Flodaigh Mòr (Floddaymore) (NF913570) (the Gaelic meaning is "big raft island"), south east of North Uist.

=== Benbecula ===
- Flodaigh (also referred to as "Flodda") (NF845555), a tidal island to the north of Benbecula.

=== Barra ===
- Flodday, Sound of Barra (NF750020), which lies east of Fuiay/Fuidheigh to the north east of Barra.
- Flodday near Vatersay (NL610925), one mile west of Sandray in the Bishop's Isles south of Barra.

== Inner Hebrides ==
- Eilean Fladday (NG585505), on the north west coast of Raasay, just north of Arnish.
- Fladda, Slate Islands (NM720123), an islet with a lighthouse south east of Belnahua in the Slate Islands.
- Fladda, Treshnish Isles (NM295435) in the Treshnish Isles.
- Staffin Island off the east coast of the Trotternish peninsula of Skye may have been known as Fladdaidh.
- Fladda-chùain ('flat island of The Minch') (NG365815), an island north of the Trotternish peninsula, Skye.

== Orkney ==
- Flotta (ND355945), an island in Scapa Flow, Orkney.
- Calf of Flotta (ND380966), an island also in Scapa Flow, near Flotta.

== Shetland ==
- Flotta (HU375462), an island in Weisdale Voe.
- Fladda (HU215845), an island north of the entrance to Hamna Voe, near the island of Muckle Ossa.
- Fladda (HU375975), an island north of the Mainland in the Ramna Stacks near the island of Gruney.

== Main references ==
- Haswell-Smith, Hamish (2004). The Scottish Islands. Edinburgh: Canongate. ISBN 978-1-84195-454-7.
- 1:50,000 (Map). Ordnance Survey.
