= Boreray =

Boreray may refer to:

An island in the Outer Hebrides of Scotland:

- Boreray, North Uist
- Boreray, St Kilda

A domesticated animal:

- Boreray sheep
