= Flodaigh, Lewis =

Island in the Outer Hebrides of Scotland

Flodaigh
Flodaigh (Gaelic)

Location
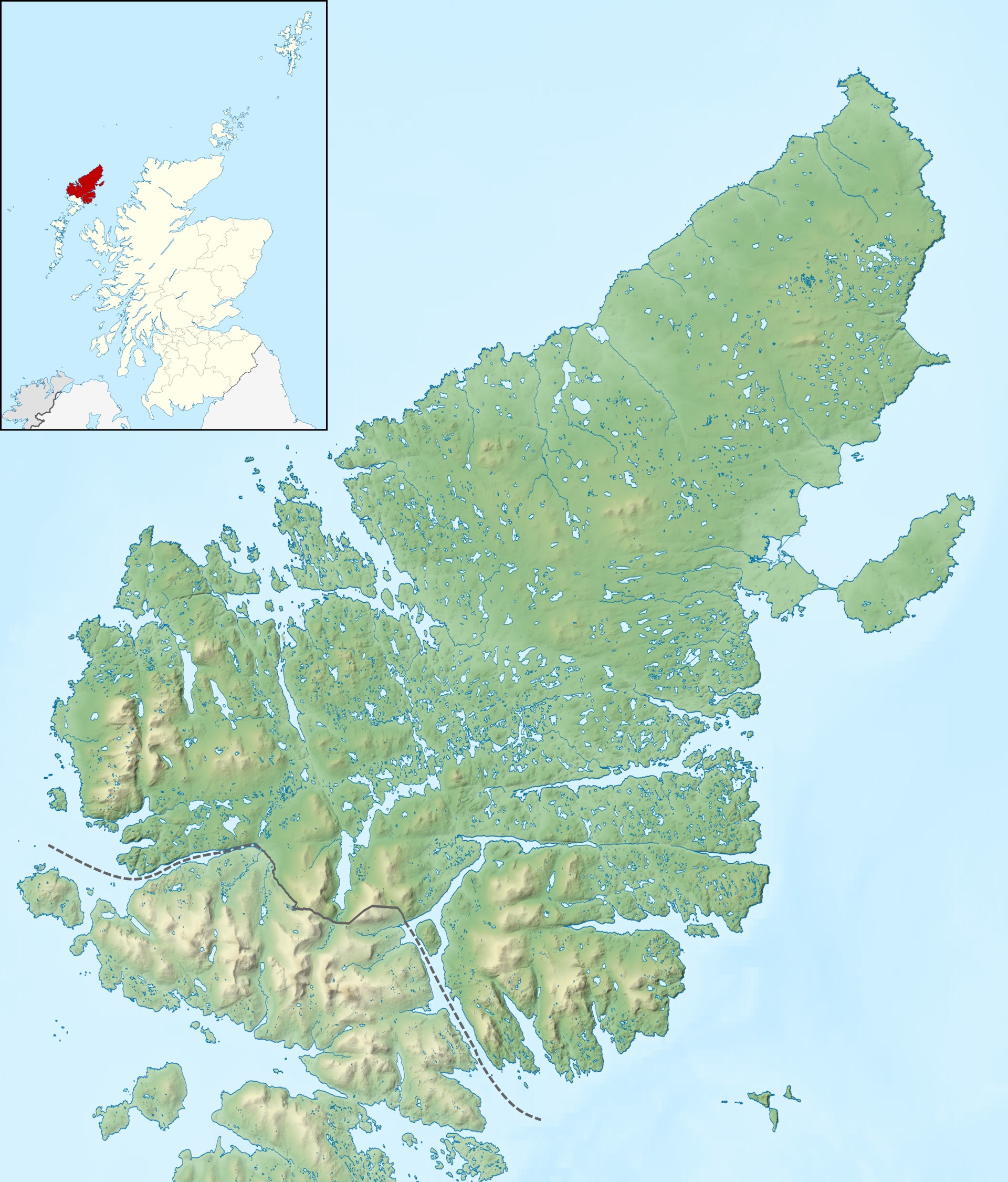
- Flodaigh shown next to Lewis Flodaigh shown within the Outer Hebrides
- OS grid reference: NB104333
- Coordinates: 58.18°N 6.91°W

Name
- Name meaning: "flat island"

Physical geography
- Island group: Lewis
- Area: 39 ha
- Highest elevation: 48 metres (157 ft)

Administration
- Council area: Western Isles
- Country: Scotland
- Sovereign state: United Kingdom

Demographics
- Population: Uninhabited

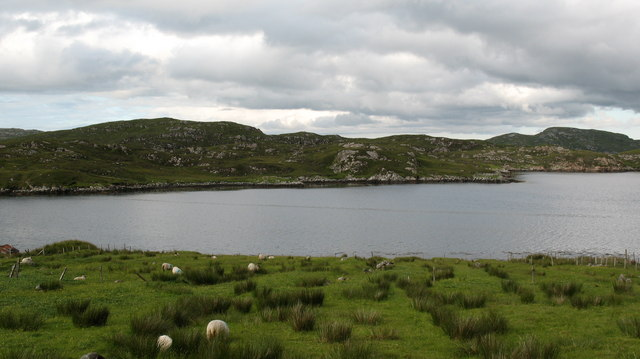
Picture of the river

Flodaigh is a small island in Loch Roag on the west coast of Lewis in the Outer Hebrides of Scotland. It is about 33 hectares (82 acres) in extent and the highest point is 48 metres (157 ft). Its name derives from the Old Norse for "flat island".

Inland, the nearest settlement is opposite the hamlet of Cairisiadar. The island was last inhabited in 1827 when it was cleared to make way for a sheep farm.

The small islet of Gousam lies to the north east and the larger islands of Fuaigh Beag and Fuaigh Mòr further east.
