= Eilean Trodday =

Island in the Scottish Highlands

Eilean Trodday (Gaelic)

Location
- Eilean Trodday shown within Highland Scotland
- OS grid reference: NG440789
- Coordinates: 57.727°N 6.300°W

Name
- Name meaning: island of the trolls

Physical geography
- Island group: Skye
- Area: 38 ha
- Highest elevation: 45 m

Administration
- Council area: Highland
- Country: Scotland
- Sovereign state: United Kingdom

Demographics
- Population: 0

Eilean Trodday is an island in The Minch just off the north coast of the Trotternish peninsula of Skye in Scotland.

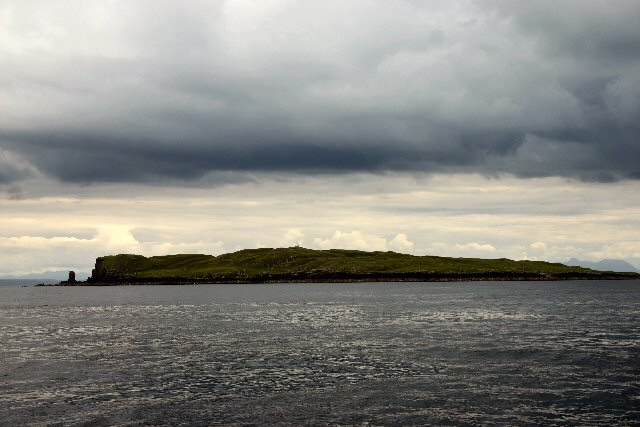
Eilean Trodday

Eilean Trodday is about 38 hectares (94 acres) in extent and the coastline has various caves and stacks. The island was inhabited in the past and there are the ruins of a small chapel, which may have been dedicated to St. Columba.

== Lighthouse ==
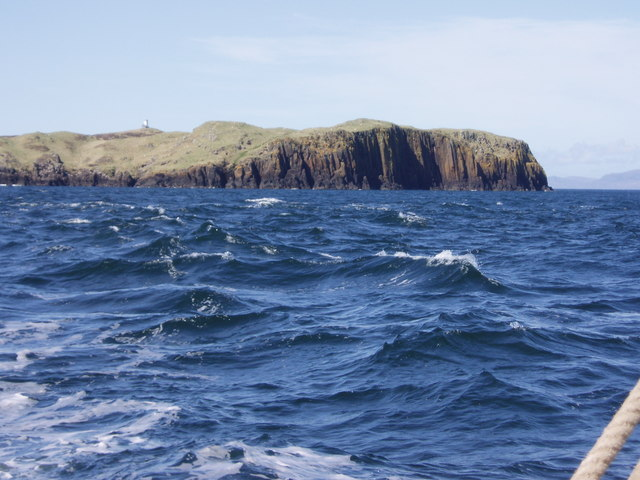
Eilean Trodday, lighthouse just visible.

On the summit, at 45 metres (148 ft) above sea level, is a lighthouse built by David and Charles Alexander Stevenson in 1908. Now a minor sector light, it marks The Minch's northbound route.

== Shipwrecks ==
The Dutch trawler Alexanders ran aground and sank on the south side of Eilean Trodday on 29 January 1974. On 2 May 1976 the German Coaster Nordhuk was carrying a cargo of grain from Gothenburg to Liverpool. Running on automatic pilot she hit the north east coast of the island near the lighthouse and sank in 28 metres (92 ft) of water. The stern section of the vessel remains intact about 100 metres (330 ft) offshore.

In 2002 the nuclear submarine HMS Trafalgar grounded on nearby Fladda-chuain whilst travelling at 14.7 knots (27.2 km/h) during a traverse of the Fladda-chuain-Eilean Trodday trough, resulting in some damage to the submarine and three minor injuries to the crew. After the grounding the submarine re-surfaced and proceeded to the Faslane base by surface transit. The Banff registered trawler, Brothers BF138 was wrecked on Eilean Trodday on the morning of 1 June 2006 with the loss of two lives.

The island is an excellent dive site with items of interest being the wreck of the Nordhuk and the sheets of multi-coloured jewel anemones, although the tidal currents are strong outside of slack water.

== See also ==
- List of islands in Scotland
- List of lighthouses in Scotland
- List of Northern Lighthouse Board lighthouses
