= Stuley =

Island in Scotland

Stulaigh (Gaelic)

Location
- Stuley shown within the Outer Hebrides
- OS grid reference: NF830234
- Coordinates: 57.19°N 7.247°W

Name
- Name meaning: Stula's Island from Norse

Physical geography
- Island group: Uists & Barra
- Area: 45 hectares (0.17 sq mi)
- Area rank: 210=
- Highest elevation: 40 metres (131 ft)

Administration
- Council area: Na h-Eileanan Siar
- Country: Scotland
- Sovereign state: United Kingdom

Demographics
- Population: 0

Stuley is an island lying to the east of South Uist in the Outer Hebrides, Scotland. It lies off the section of coastline between Loch Eynort and Loch Boisdale. It is 45 hectares (0.17 sq mi) and 40 metres (131 ft) at its highest point.

== Geography and geology ==
The rock is "intermediate and basic Lewisian rock with a distinctly greenish colour".

It is separated from South Uist by Stuley Sound. Off the east coast are three islets/skerries - Dubh-Sgeir Mhòr & Dubh-Sgeir Bheag, and Glas-Eilean Mòr. Glas-Eilean Beag is to the west.

== History ==
From local placenames such as Creag na h-Oraide (on Stuley), and Creag an t-Sagairt (on nearby Uist), meaning the rocks of the speech/sermon and priest respectively, there is some evidence of ecclesiastical connections, possibly culdee.

The island's name is Norse in origin, meaning "Stula's Island". Stula's name can also be found in the name of a mountain on the nearby Uist "mainland", Stulaval.

There are no written records of habitation, and it is currently used for sheep grazing. Haswell-Smith however notes the remains of lazybeds, and ruins of shielings (habitations for summer grazing), and suggests that the island was yet another victim of the Highland Clearances.
