= Flodaigh (Outer Loch Ròg) =

Flodaigh (Gaelic)

Location
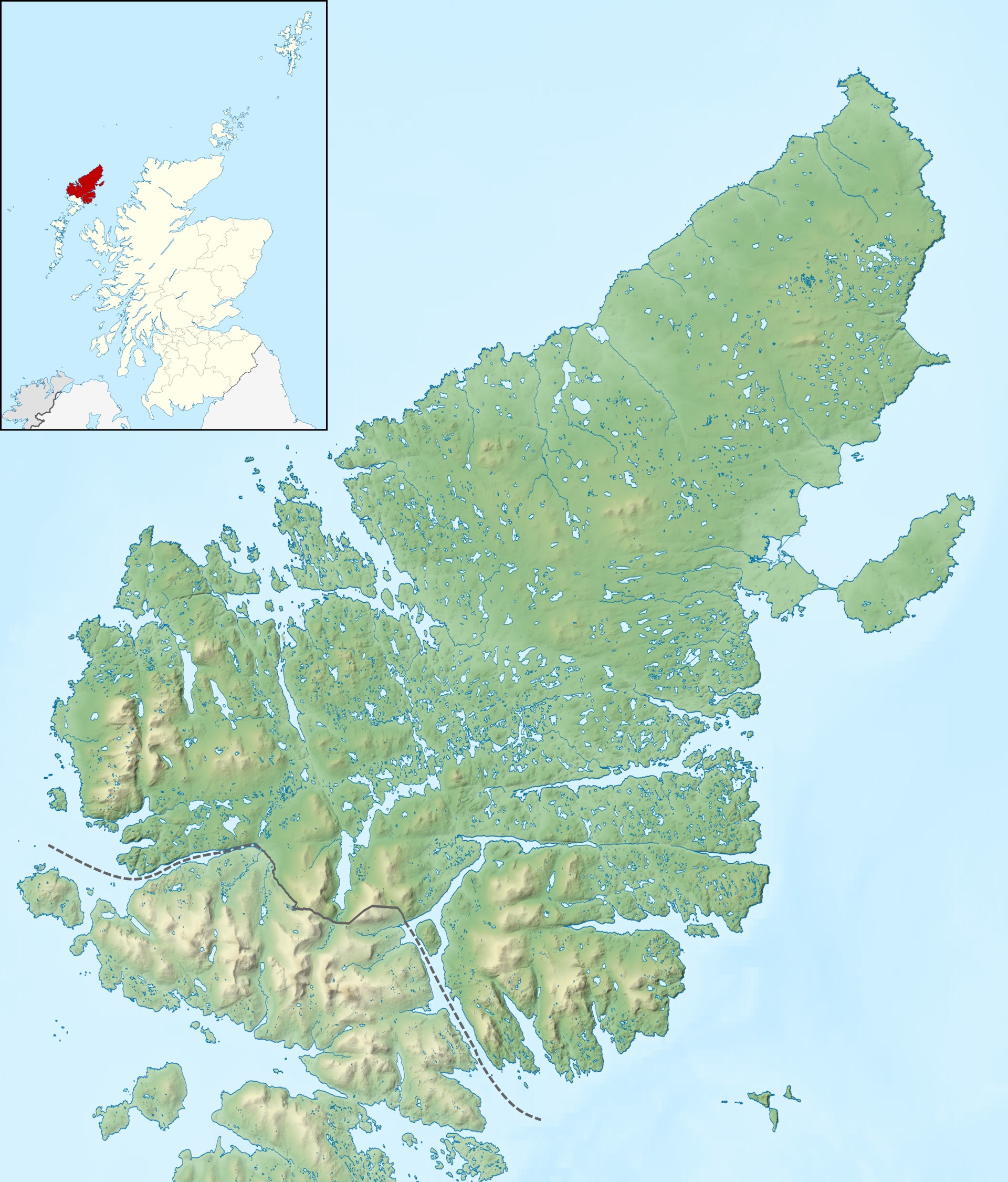
- Flodaigh shown next to Lewis Flodaigh shown within the Outer Hebrides
- OS grid reference: NB123413
- Coordinates: 58.27°N 6.91°W

Name
- Name meaning: raft island
- Old Norse name: Flot-ay

Physical geography
- Island group: Outer Hebrides
- Area: <10 ha
- Highest elevation: 22 metres (72 ft)

Administration
- Council area: Comhairle nan Eilean Siar
- Country: Scotland
- Sovereign state: United Kingdom

Flodaigh is an islet in outer Loch Ròg, Lewis, Scotland. It lies north west of Great Bernera and Little Bernera, south of Bearasaigh and Seanna Chnoc and west of Campaigh.

There are various islets and skerries surrounding the island including Fleisgeir, Sgeir an Saoidhean and the tidal Tamna.

There is no regular access to the island although boat excursions are available locally.
