= Finlaggan =

Archaeological site in Argyll and Bute, Scotland

Coordinates: 55.83431°N 6.17304°W

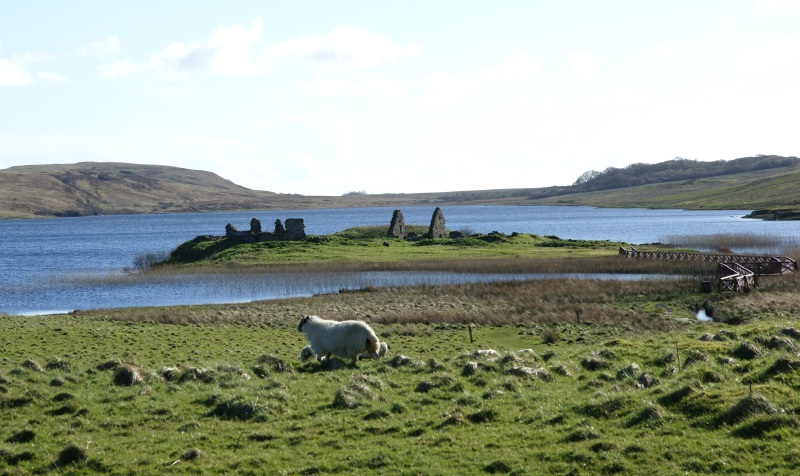
Looking southwest down Loch Finlaggan with the ruins of buildings around the site of Finlaggan Castle on the island of Eilean Mòr in Loch Finlaggan, a loch in the island of Islay

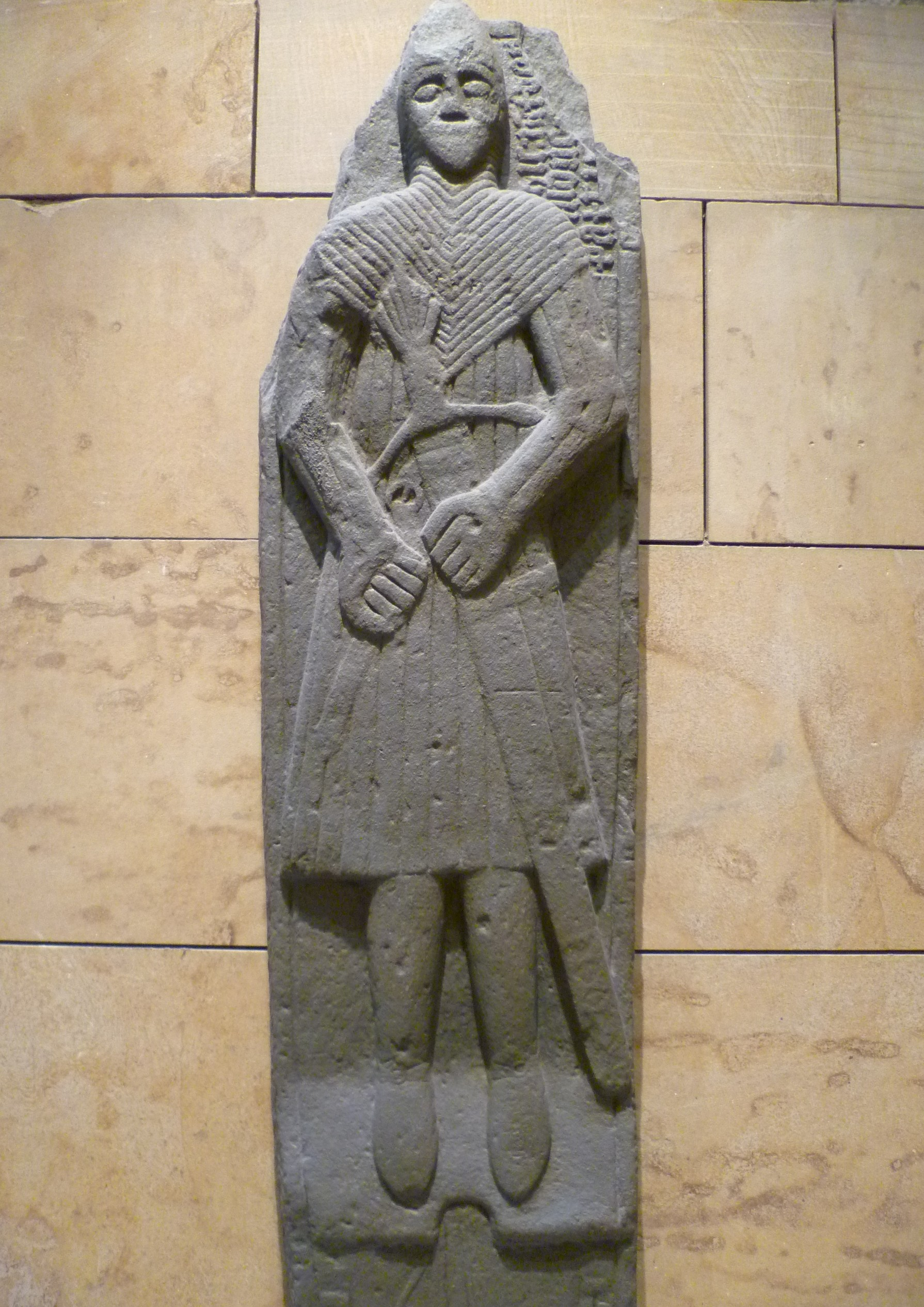
The tomb effigy of Domhnall Mac Gilleasbuig, crown tenant of Finlaggan during the 1540s

Finlaggan (NR 388 680, Scottish Gaelic: Port an Eilein) is a historic site on Eilean Mòr (Note: Because of varying spelling conventions, this name may appear with either an acute ("Mór") or grave ("Mòr") accent; the latter is the modern convention.) in Loch Finlaggan, on the island of Islay, around 4 km west of the ferry terminal at Port Askaig.

== History ==
Finlaggan was the seat of the Lords of the Isles and of Clan Donald. Two of the three islands in Loch Finlaggan, Eilean Mòr ("Great Isle") and Eilean na Comhairle ("Isle of the Council"), were the administrative centre of the Lordship of the Isles during the 13th to 15th centuries, until 1493 when the lordship of the Isles fell to James IV of Scotland, who administered the territory via a tenant-in-chief.

== Archaeology ==
The Finlaggan Trust maintains the site and also refurbished a derelict cottage that has been converted into a comprehensive museum. The centre contains numerous artefacts discovered during archaeological excavations: from a sheep wool quilted aketon, worn under armour, to an ancient cross related to the lords.

The site has been the subject of recent archaeological investigations and hosted an episode of Channel 4's archaeological television programme Time Team in 1995. During summer 2008 the centre was extensively refurbished and extended. The stone walls of a medieval chapel dedicated to St Findlugan on Eilean Mòr have been stabilised and several 16th century graves put on display and covered by large glass panels. In May 2019, researchers at the University of St Andrews, working with the Finlaggan Trust and the National Museum of Scotland, announced the creation of a virtual-reality reconstruction of the settlement in the early 15th century, based on archaeological data. The reconstruction will be on show at the visitor centre.

== Finlaggan Castle ==
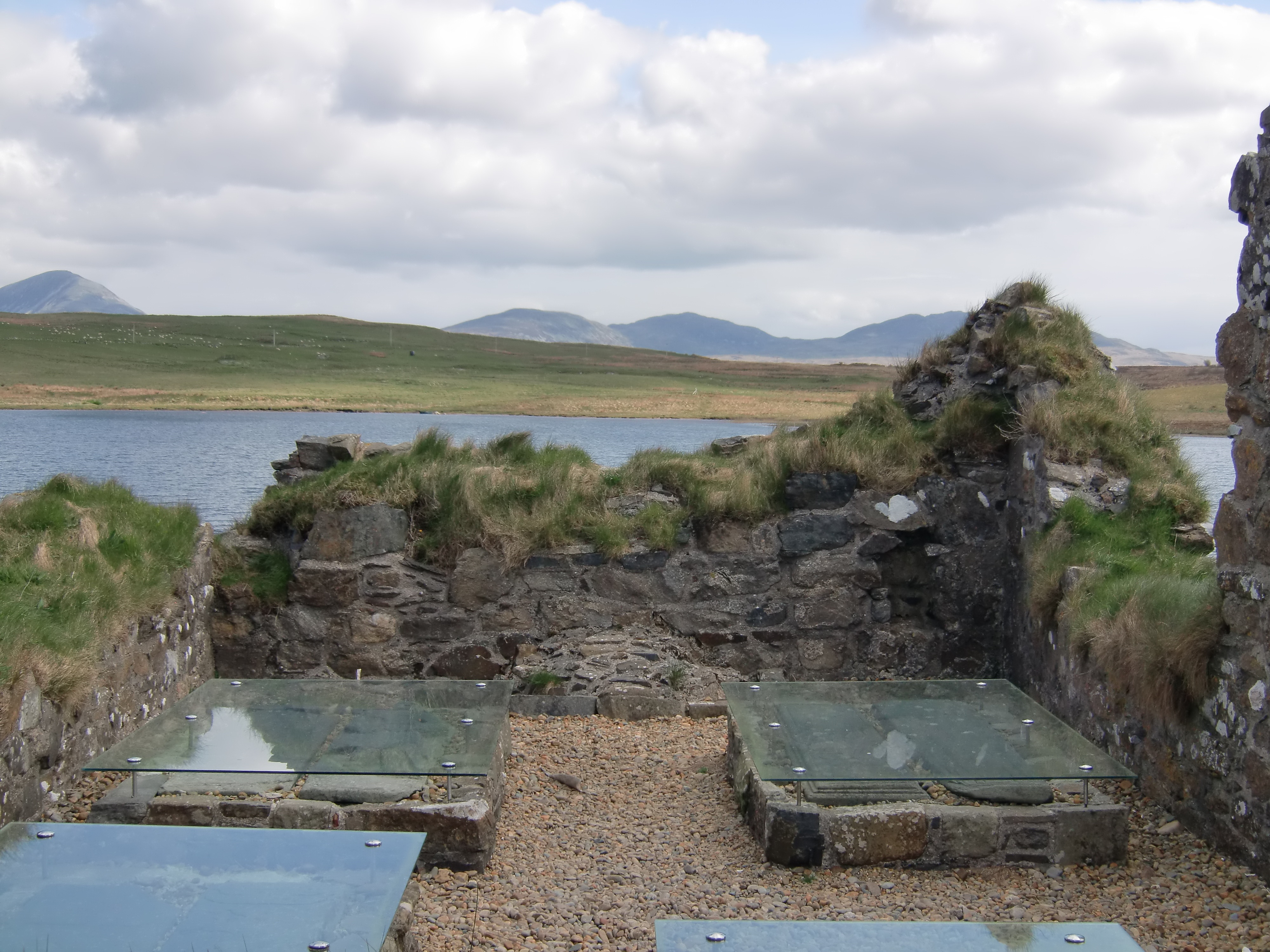
Ancient graves in the ruins of Kilfinlaggan Chapel next to the site of Finlaggan Castle

Finlaggan Castle (Scottish Gaelic: Port an Eilein, English: Port of the Island), also known as Eilean Mòr Castle, is a ruined fortified house located on the isle of Eilean Mòr on Loch Finlaggan. It was once a residence and stronghold of Lord of the Isles and Clan Donald.

In the first half of the 7th century, a monastic community was established on Eilean Mòr, the largest of the three islands in the loch. This was either dedicated to or possibly founded by St Findlugan, an Irish monk and a contemporary of St Columba. St Findlugan is officially venerated as a saint in the Catholic Church and Eastern Orthodox Church.

The ruins we see today are from a castle built in the 13th century, with masonry walls. An earlier construction, likely timber, was erected in 1138 by Somerled, Lord of Argyll, Kintyre, and Lorne, the first "Lord of the Isles". The 12th century building might have been constructed on the remains of an earlier Iron Age fort. The Lords of the Isles used the fortress as a principal court and meeting place of their clan chiefs. Iain Mòr MacDonald, 3rd of Dunnyveg, and his son Iain Cathanach MacDonald were taken prisoner at Finlaggan Castle, through the deception of MacIain of Ardnamurchan, for the hanging and execution of the governor of Dunaverty Castle and were later tried and hanged on the Burgh Muir, Edinburgh. In 1541 Finlaggan was held from the Crown by Donald MacGilleasbuig. The castle appears to have been demolished in the 15th–16th centuries.
