= Staffin Island =

Island in Highland, Scotland

Eilean Stafainn (Gaelic)
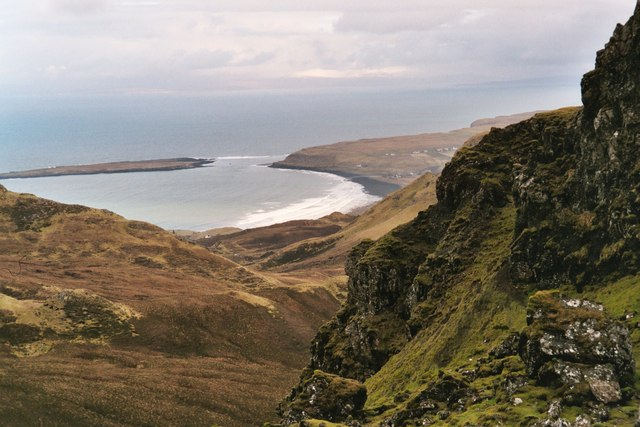
- Staffin Island from The Quirang

Location
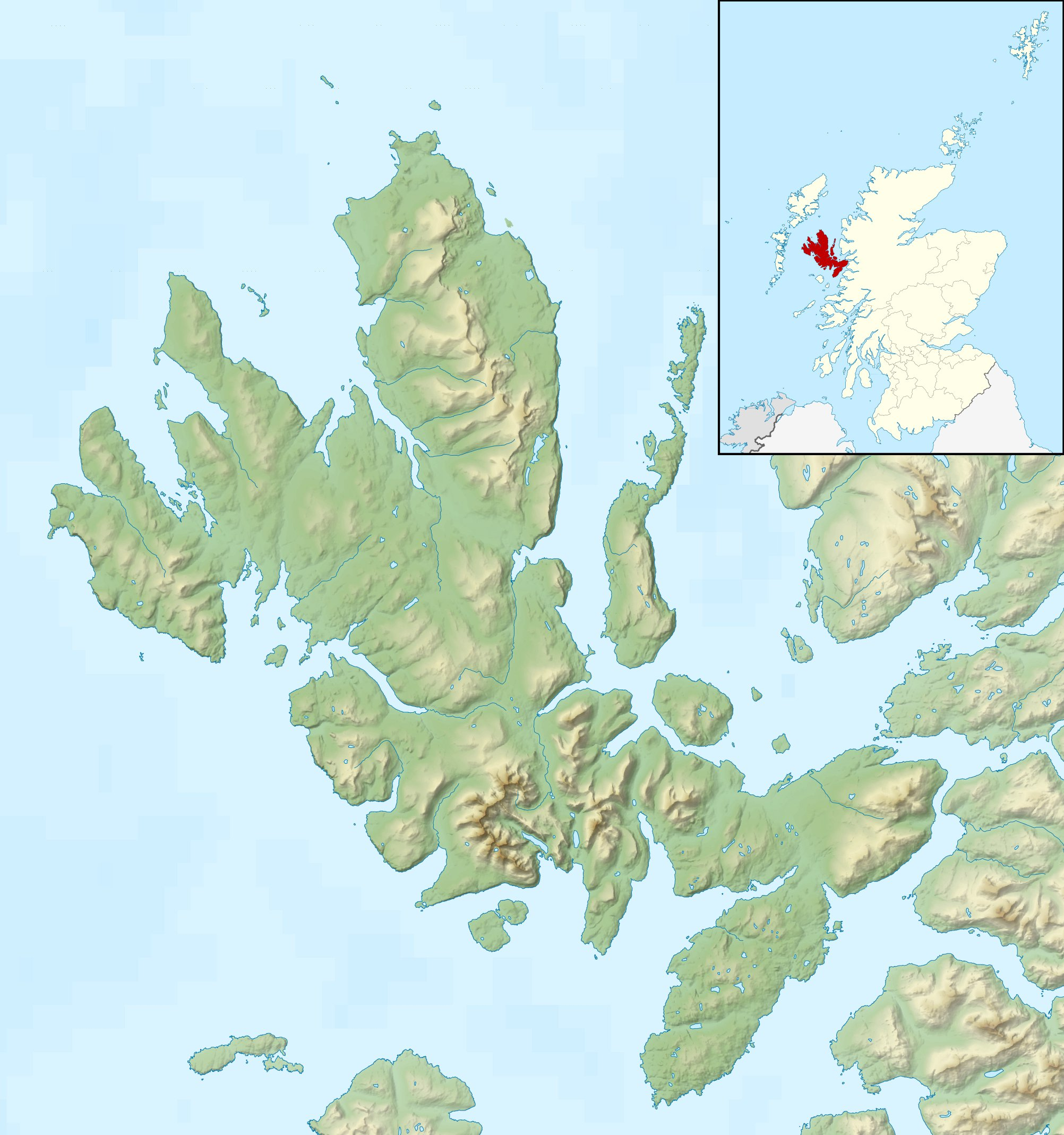
- Staffin Island shown relative to Skye
- OS grid reference: NG491693
- Coordinates: 57.64°N 6.205°W

Name
- Name meaning: Norse for "flat island"
- Old Norse name: Flat-ey

Physical geography
- Island group: Skye
- Area: 22 ha
- Highest elevation: c. 10 metres (33 ft)

Administration
- Council area: Highland
- Country: Scotland
- Sovereign state: United Kingdom

Demographics
- Population: 0

Staffin Island, also known as Stenscholl Island or Fladdaidh, is an uninhabited islet in Staffin Bay, off the east coast of the Trotternish peninsula of Skye in Scotland.

In 2011 it was reported that the island may be the last in Scotland where the old tradition of having cattle swim between grazings is still carried out. Crofter Iain MacDonald, who used to swim with the animals, now uses a boat to encourage them to swim from Staffin Island to Skye in early spring and back again in October.

"The Hut on Staffin Island" is a tune composed by Phil Cunningham.
