= Fuaigh Mòr =

Island in Outer Hebrides, Scotland

Fuaigh Mòr (Gaelic)

Location
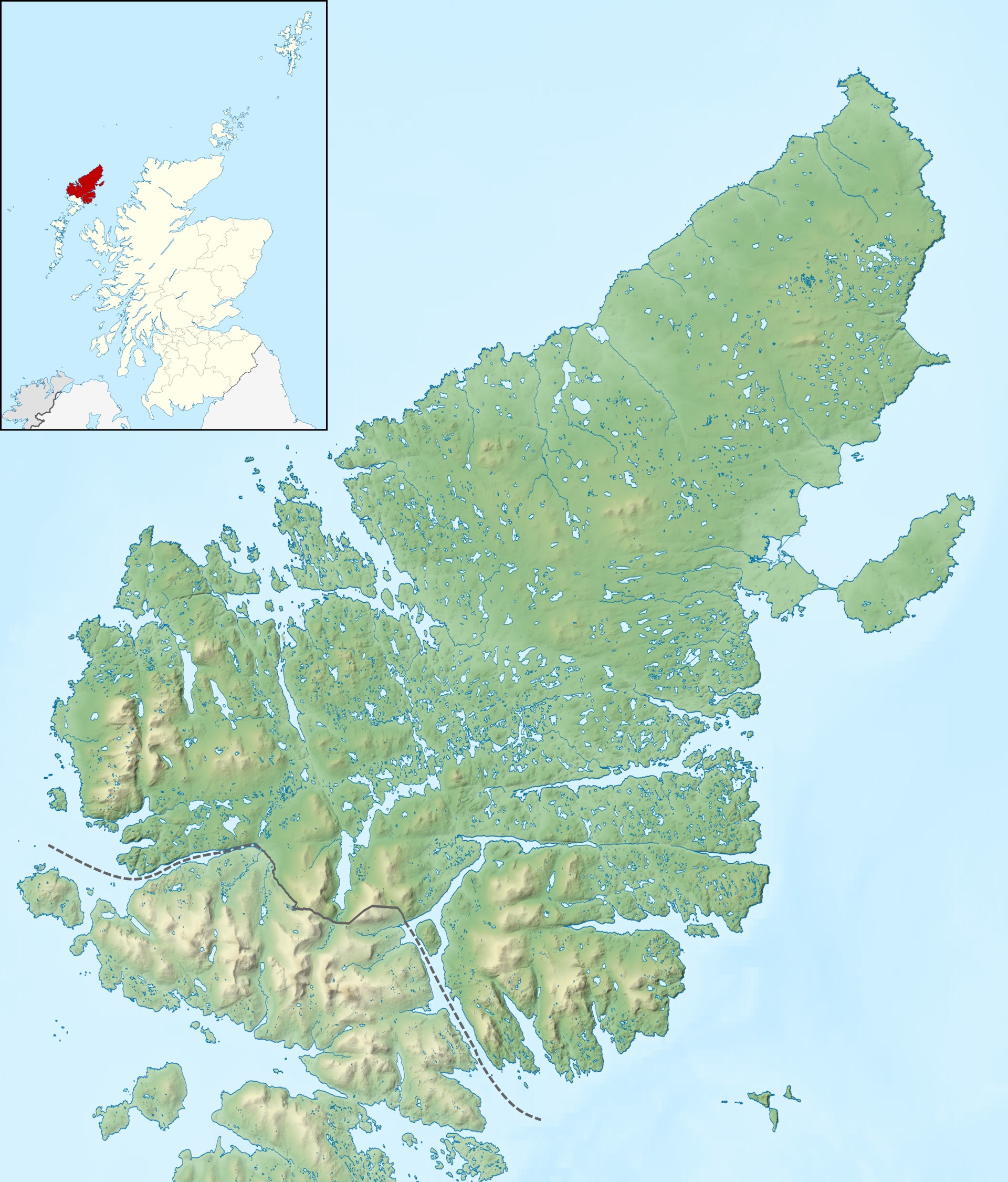
- Fuaigh Mòr shown next to Lewis Fuaigh Mòr shown within the Outer Hebrides
- OS grid reference: NB129349
- Coordinates: 58.21°N 6.89°W

Name
- Name meaning: "Large Vuia", or "house island", from Norse

Physical geography
- Island group: Outer Hebrides
- Area: 84 ha (5/16 sq mi)
- Area rank: 159=
- Highest elevation: Mullach na Beinne 67 m (220 ft)

Administration
- Council area: Comhairle nan Eilean Siar
- Country: Scotland
- Sovereign state: United Kingdom

Demographics
- Population: 0

Fuaigh Mòr (sometimes anglicised as Vuia Mor) is an island in the Outer Hebrides of Scotland. It is off the west coast of Lewis near Great Bernera in Loch Ròg. It is 84 hectares (208 acres) and 67 metres (220 feet) at its highest point.

== History ==
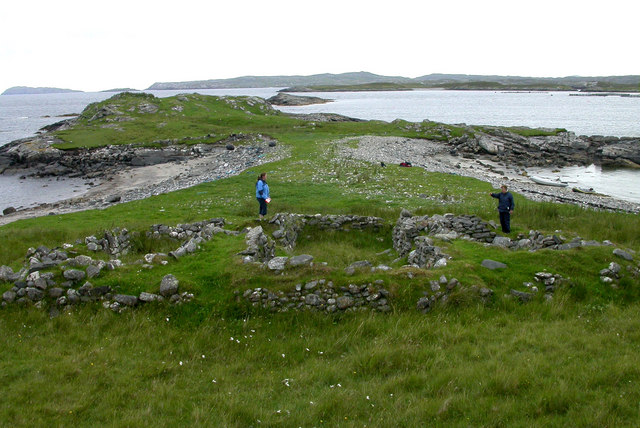
Ruins of homes and a grain kiln, on the east side of the island

In 1841, Fuaigh Mòr was the scene of an incident in the Highland Clearances, a subject that still evokes much bitterness in the surrounding area.

A local Lewis story goes that the Bernera Ground Officer, who was responsible for the evictions, was later dismissed from his post and ended up as a tramp in Ontario, Canada. While he was begging for food in Ontario, he came to the door of someone he had evicted from Fuaigh Mòr, but did not recognise them at first. The evictee is said to have given him food, and then reminded him of who she was.

The island is currently uninhabited, and now used only for grazing sheep.

== Geography and geology ==
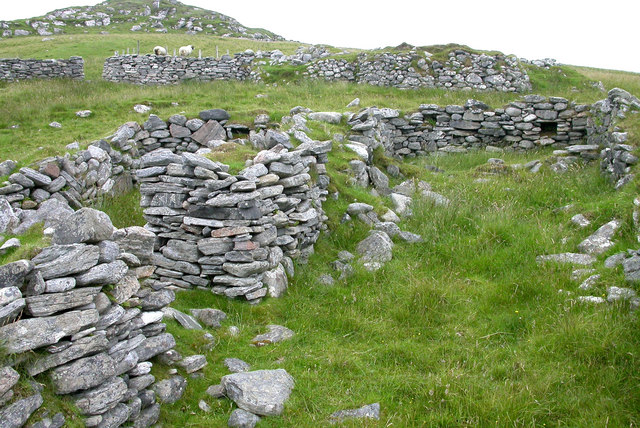
The remains of houses and sheep fanks

The rock is Lewisian gneiss.

The island itself is L-shaped, tapering towards the north. The south east has a small headland extended northwards, called Rubha na h-Athadh, which has a cairn on it. There are a couple of caves in the north as well. There are cliffs on the west coast such as Creag na h-Iolaire (eagle crag).

There are many skerries and small islands near it such as Geile Sgeir, Garbh Eilean, Eilean nam Feannag, Linngeam, Cliatasay, Grousam and yet another Floday, as well as Fuaigh Beag. Eunay Mòr is between the island and Great Bernera.
