= Seanna Chnoc =

Seana Bheinn (Gaelic)
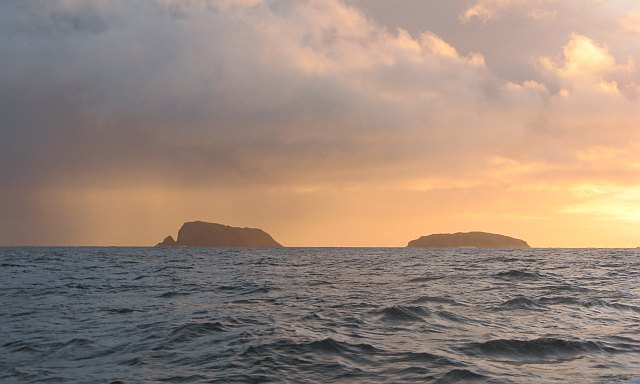
- Seana Chnoc (at left) and Bearasaigh from the south west. Stac nam Balg is just visible to the left of Seanna Chnoc

Location
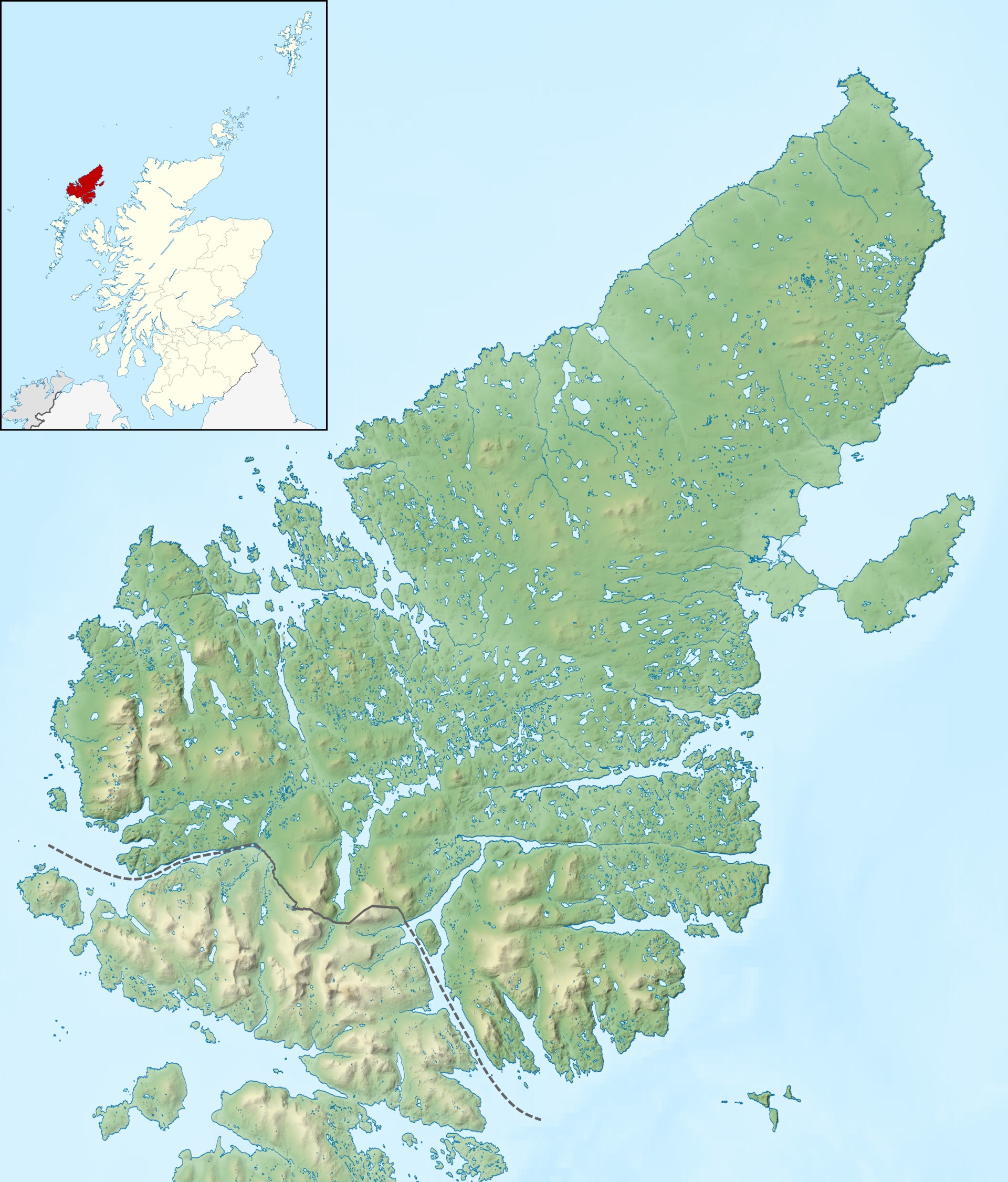
- Seanna Chnoc shown next to Lewis Seanna Chnoc shown within the Outer Hebrides
- OS grid reference: NB116413
- Coordinates: 58.27°N 6.91°W

Name
- Name meaning: Old Hill

Physical geography
- Island group: Outer Hebrides
- Area: <10 ha
- Highest elevation: 91 metres (299 ft)

Administration
- Council area: Comhairle nan Eilean Siar
- Country: Scotland
- Sovereign state: United Kingdom

Seanna Chnoc (English: "old hill"), correctly known as Seana Bheinn is an islet in outer Loch Ròg, Lewis, Scotland. It lies north west of Great Bernera and Bearasaigh.

Stac nam Balg lies offshore to the north and there is a cave in the north west of the island.

There is no regular access to the island although boat excursions are available locally.

The correct name for the island is Seanna Bheinn and this is the name that has always been in local use by the local population although it is highly likely an earlier Norse name was used. The name Seanna Chnoc was introduced by the Ordnance Survey through the advice of linguistic academics but is unfortunately incorrect. The island appears to have been called Garvilan in the early 19th century which is an English corruption of Garbh Eilean meaning an inhospitable island and in 1549, Dean Monro wrote: "Besides the coist of Leozus towards the said north-west lyis ane Ile callit Garvellan, gude for store and fishing, perteining to Mccloyd of Leozus".
