= Fladda-chùain =

Island of the Inner Hebrides

Fladda-chùain (Gaelic)

Location
- Fladda-chùain shown within Highland Scotland
- OS grid reference: NG365815
- Coordinates: 57.746°N 6.429°W

Physical geography
- Island group: Skye
- Area: 19 ha (1/16 sq mi)
- Highest elevation: 29 m (95 ft)

Administration
- Council area: Highland
- Country: Scotland
- Sovereign state: United Kingdom

Demographics
- Population: 0

Fladda-chùain, or Fladaigh Chùain, is an island of the Inner Hebrides north of the Trotternish peninsula of Skye. It is the major island of the Fladda-chùain group between Skye and the Outer Hebrides.

== Name ==
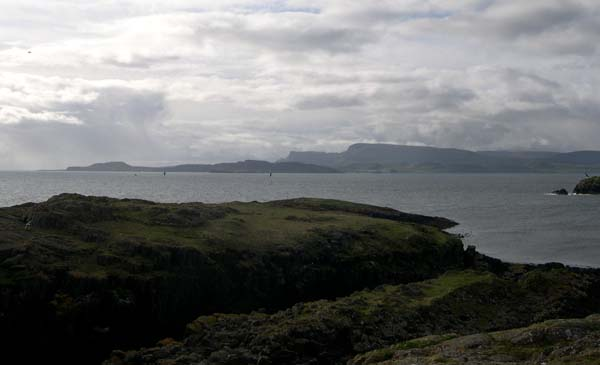
View from Fladda-chùain across the sea to Skye

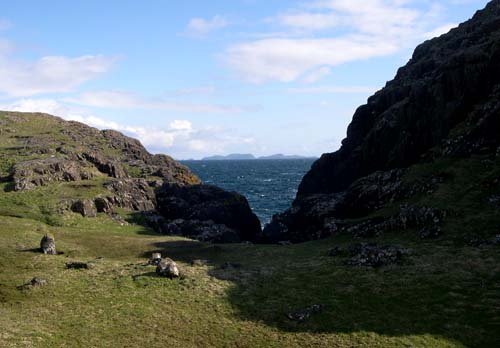
View from Fladda-chùain north toward the Shiant Islands

The name of the island derives from Old Norse Flatey, meaning a "flat island", and Cuan, a Scottish Gaelic word meaning "ocean" (or bay in Irish and Old Gaelic). The latter probably refers to the Minch, which is known as An Cuan Sgìth ("Ocean of Skye") or Cuan na Hearadh ("Ocean of Harris"). The suffix is also added to distinguish this island from the many others with similar names.

== History ==
Fladda-chùain is the subject of some legends.

There are the ruins of a chapel here, said to have been founded by one "O' Gorgon" in the days of St. Columba, and/or dedicated to him. It is said also that MacDonald of the Isles hid his deeds here prior to the Jacobite rising of 1715.

The last known inhabitant was known as "Am Muileach Mòr", which means either "the Big Mullman", or the "man of the headland".

In 2002 the nuclear submarine HMS Trafalgar grounded on Fladda-chùain whilst travelling at 14.7 knots (27.2 km/h) during a traverse of the Fladda-chùain-Eilean Trodday trough, resulting in some damage to the submarine and three minor injuries to the crew. After the grounding the submarine re-surfaced and proceeded to the Faslane base by surface transit. The main cause of the accident was reported as being the use of tracing paper to cover the navigational chart to protect it from being written on, so obscuring vital information. Damage to the hull cost an estimated £5 million to repair.

A few hundred metres to the south lie the islets of Gaeilavore, Gearran and Am Bord (Lord Macdonald's Table).
