= Fuaigh Beag =

Island in Scotland

Coordinates: 58°11′46″N 6°53′55″W

Fuaigh Beag or Vuia Be(a)g is an island in the Outer Hebrides. It is off the west coast of Lewis near Great Bernera in Loch Roag. Its name means "little Fuaigh", and is named in contrast to Fuaigh Mòr nearby.

== History ==
The element "Fuaigh", derives from an Old Norse name.

Fuaigh Beag was cleared in 1827, and it has been uninhabited ever since.

== Geography and geology ==
The island is 35 hectares (86 acres) in extent and the rock is Lewisian gneiss.

There are many skerries and small islands near it such as Geile Sgeir, Garbh Eilean, Eilean nam Feannag, Linngeam, Cliatasay, Gousam and yet another Floday.

== See also ==
- List of islands of Scotland
