= Boreray, North Uist =

Island with a single croft in the Outer Hebrides of Scotland

Boreray
Boraraigh (Gaelic)
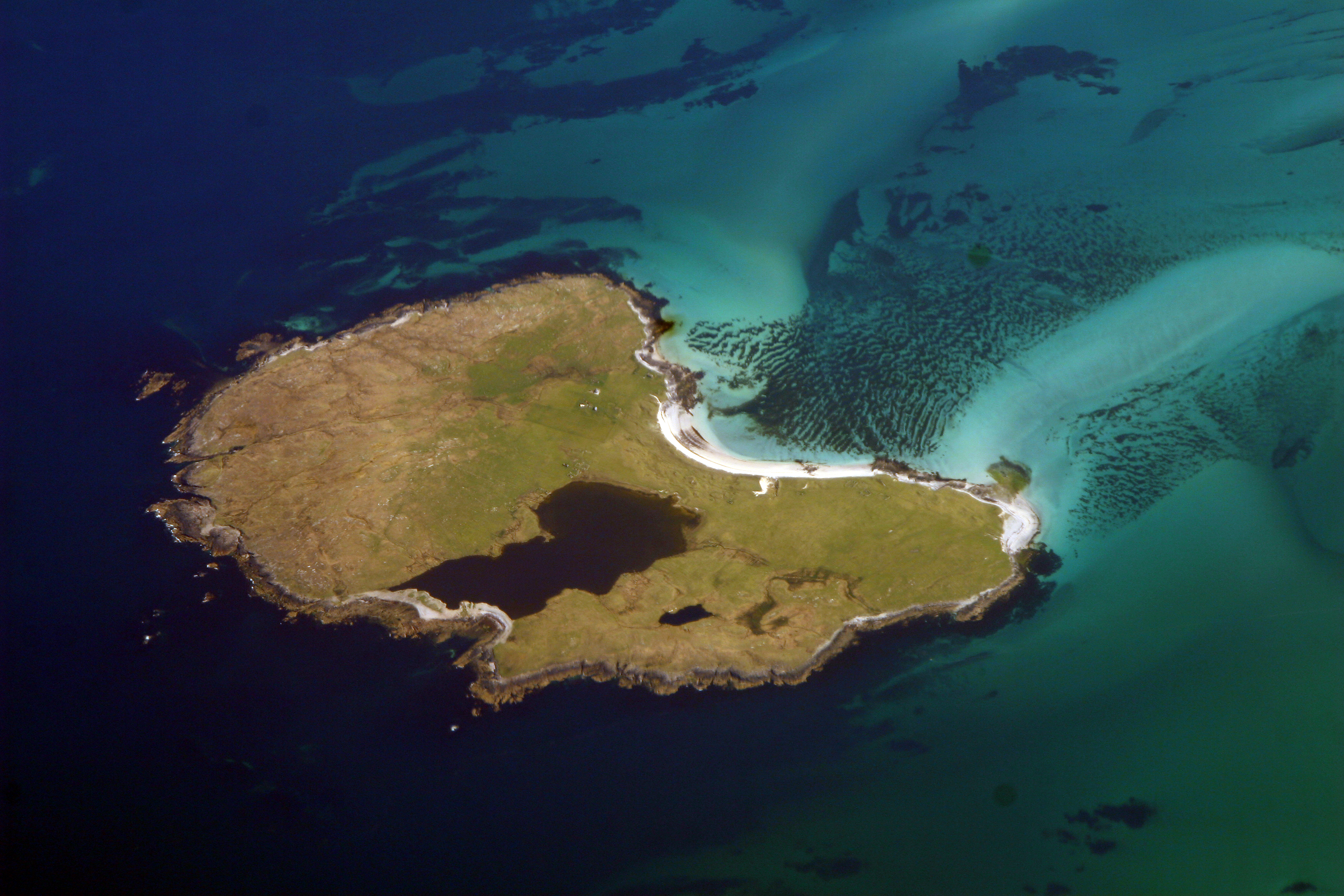

Location
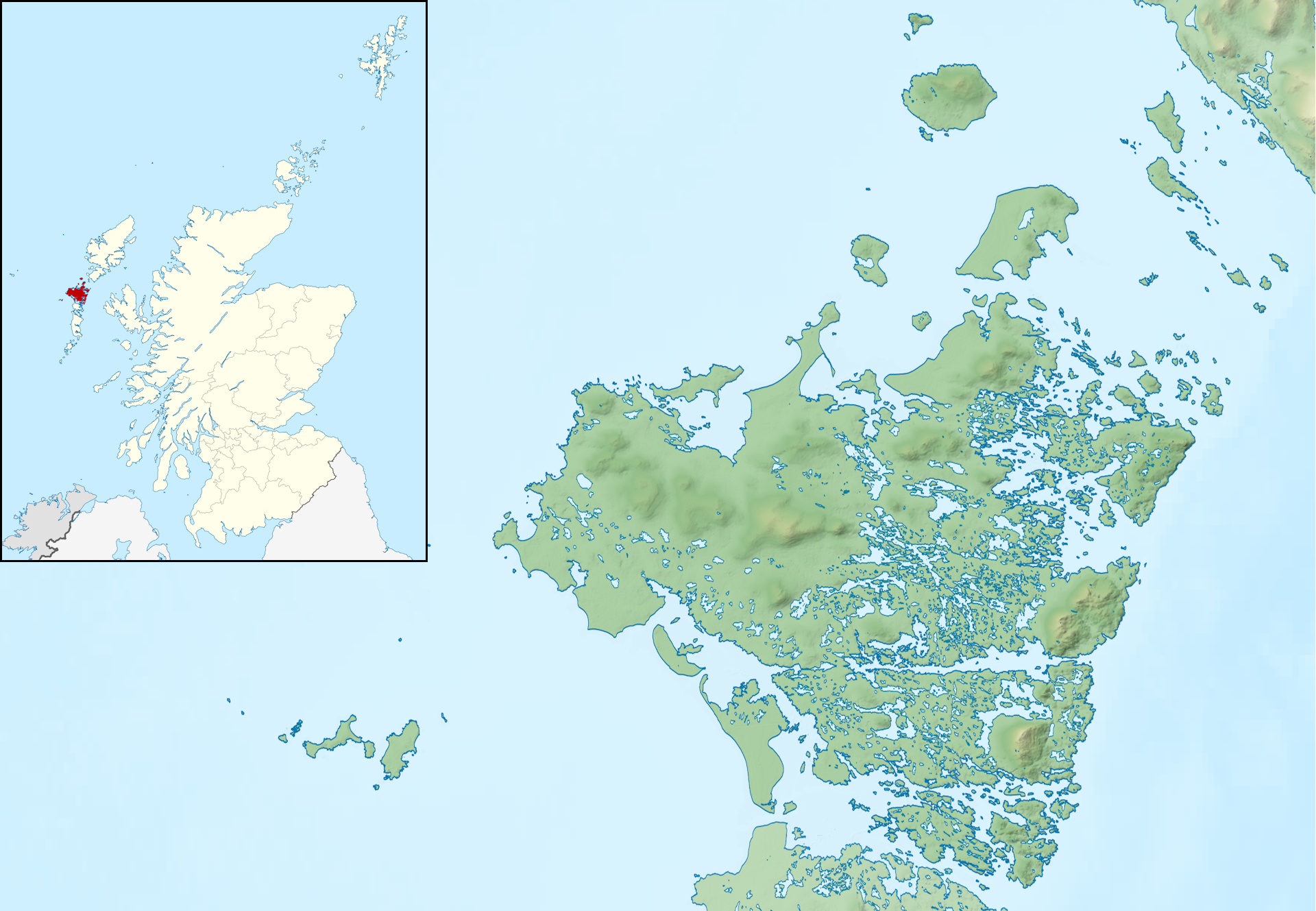
- Boreray shown next to North Uist Boreray shown within the Outer Hebrides
- OS grid reference: NF855815
- Coordinates: 57.7128°N 7.283°W

Name
- Gaelic pronunciation: [ˈpɔɾəɾaj]
- Name meaning: fort island
- Old Norse name: Boreray

Physical geography
- Island group: Uist and Barra
- Area: 198 ha (489 acres)
- Area rank: 110
- Highest elevation: Mullach Mòr 56 m (184 ft)

Administration
- Council area: Outer Hebrides
- Country: Scotland
- Sovereign state: United Kingdom

Demographics
- Population: 1
- Population rank: 95=

Boreray (Scottish Gaelic: Boraraigh) is an island with a single croft, lying 2 kilometres (1.2 mi) north of North Uist in the Outer Hebrides of Scotland.

== Geography ==
The north of the island is hilly and dominated by Mullach Mòr. The single croft and buildings are situated in the north-east of the island. The north is largely separated from the flatter southern half by Loch Mòr (big loch) and a strip of sand dunes.

== History ==
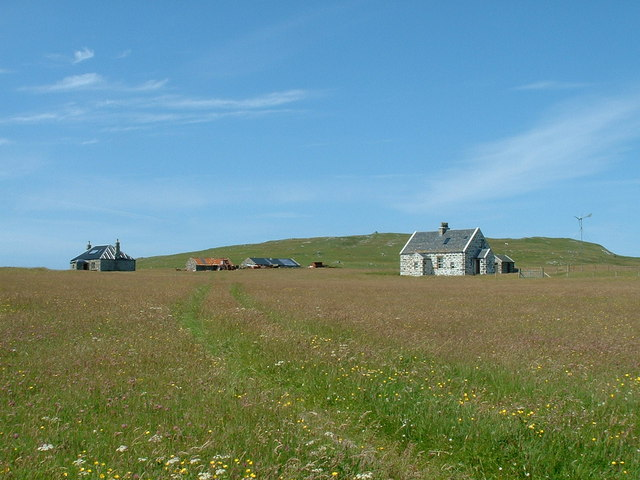
Boreray's croft buildings

The island was occupied from prehistoric times. From the fifteenth century, it was owned by the MacLeans. The thirteenth MacLean of Boreray left the island in around 1810, and the island was divided into twenty crofts. The population grew quickly, and 181 inhabitants were recorded in the 1841 census. Through the 19th century there were over 100 people living there.

Over-cultivation and the collapse of the kelp trade brought a gradual decline in the population. In 1923, the island was evacuated at the request of the islanders. One family stayed on until the 1960s, when the island was abandoned. In 1999, the present crofter started rebuilding work and remains the island's sole regular inhabitant.

== Present day ==
The single croft forms the north-east part of the island. The grazing rights for the remainder are leased to the crofters of the nearby island of Berneray.
