= Eileach an Naoimh =

Uninhabited island in Scotland

Eileach an Naoimh (Gaelic)
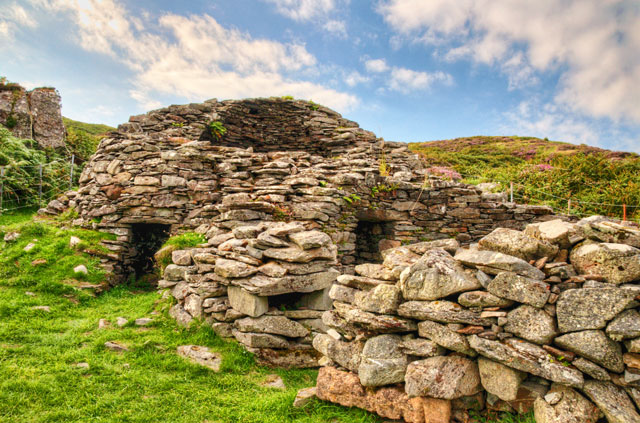
- Beehive hut

Location
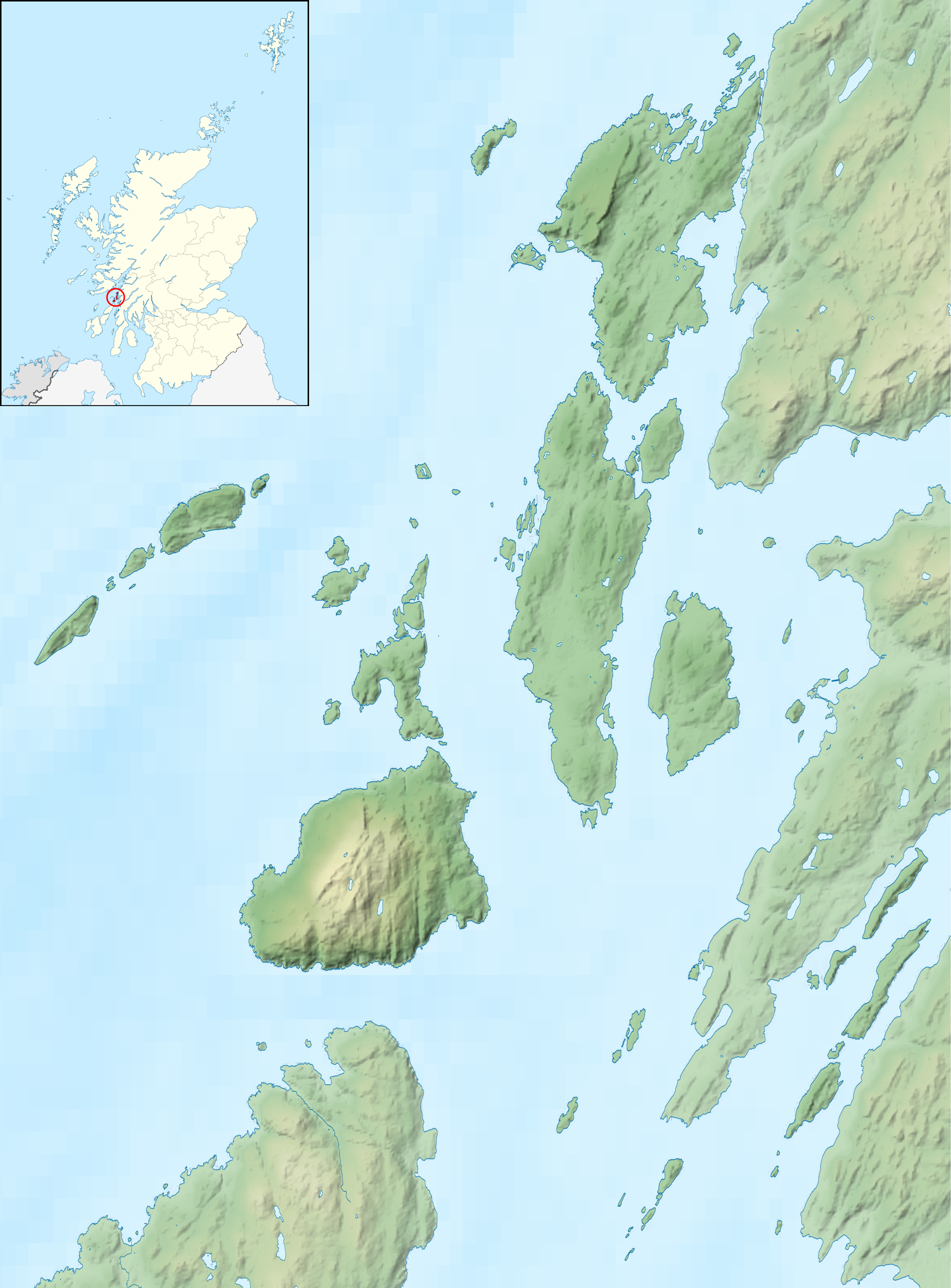
- Eileach an Naoimh shown within the Garvellachs, and next to the Slate Islands, Scarba, and the isles of Loch Craignish Eileach an Naoimh shown within Argyll and Bute
- OS grid reference: NM641098
- Coordinates: 56.2225°N 5.8060°W

Name
- Name meaning: rocky place of the saint

Physical geography
- Island group: Garvellachs
- Area: 56 ha (138 acres)
- Area rank: 188
- Highest elevation: 80 m (262 ft)

Administration
- Council area: Argyll and Bute
- Country: Scotland
- Sovereign state: United Kingdom

Demographics
- Population: 0

Eileach an Naoimh is an uninhabited island in the Inner Hebrides of the west coast of Scotland. It is the second largest and southernmost of the Garvellachs archipelago and lies in the Firth of Lorn between Mull and Argyll. The name of the island is Gaelic for "rocky place of the saint" or from na-h-Eileacha Naomha meaning "the holy rocks".

The island is known for its early Christian connections to Brendan the Navigator and Columba and for bedrock containing rare formations in relation to the global Sturtian glaciation. There is no ferry service, and transport to the island and its neighbours must be arranged privately.

== Geography and Geology ==
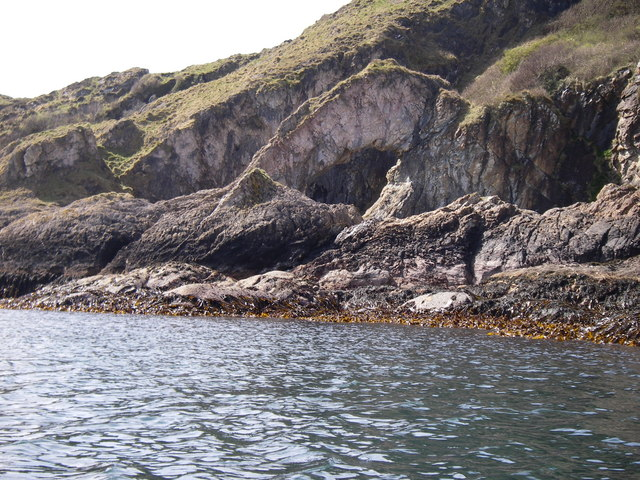
The natural arch of An Clàrsach

Eileach an Naoimh has an area of 56 ha (138 acres) and its highest point is 80 m (262 ft). The eastern side is relatively low-lying but in the west the land rises and then drops "sheer into the Atlantic" in cliffs of metamorphosed limestone up to 60 m (200 ft) high. There is an anchorage on the south-eastern shore between the island and two offshore islets, although this is not recommended except in settled weather. At the northern tip of the island is a natural arch called An Clàrsach (The Harp) and there is also a natural rock pillar some 4 m (13 ft) high called Columba's Pulpit or The Crannogg just north of the anchorage. The whole archipelago is part of the Scarba, Lunga and the Garvellachs National Scenic Area, one of 40 such areas in Scotland. The other members of the archipelago include Garbh Eileach, Dùn Chonnuill and A' Chùli.

Eileach an Naoimh has been uninhabited "for many centuries".

A 2024 study by researchers at University College London, regarding the relationship of some of its bedrock to the Sturtian glaciation, suggests the archipelago "may be the only place on Earth to have a detailed record of how the Earth entered one of the most catastrophic periods in its history."

== History ==
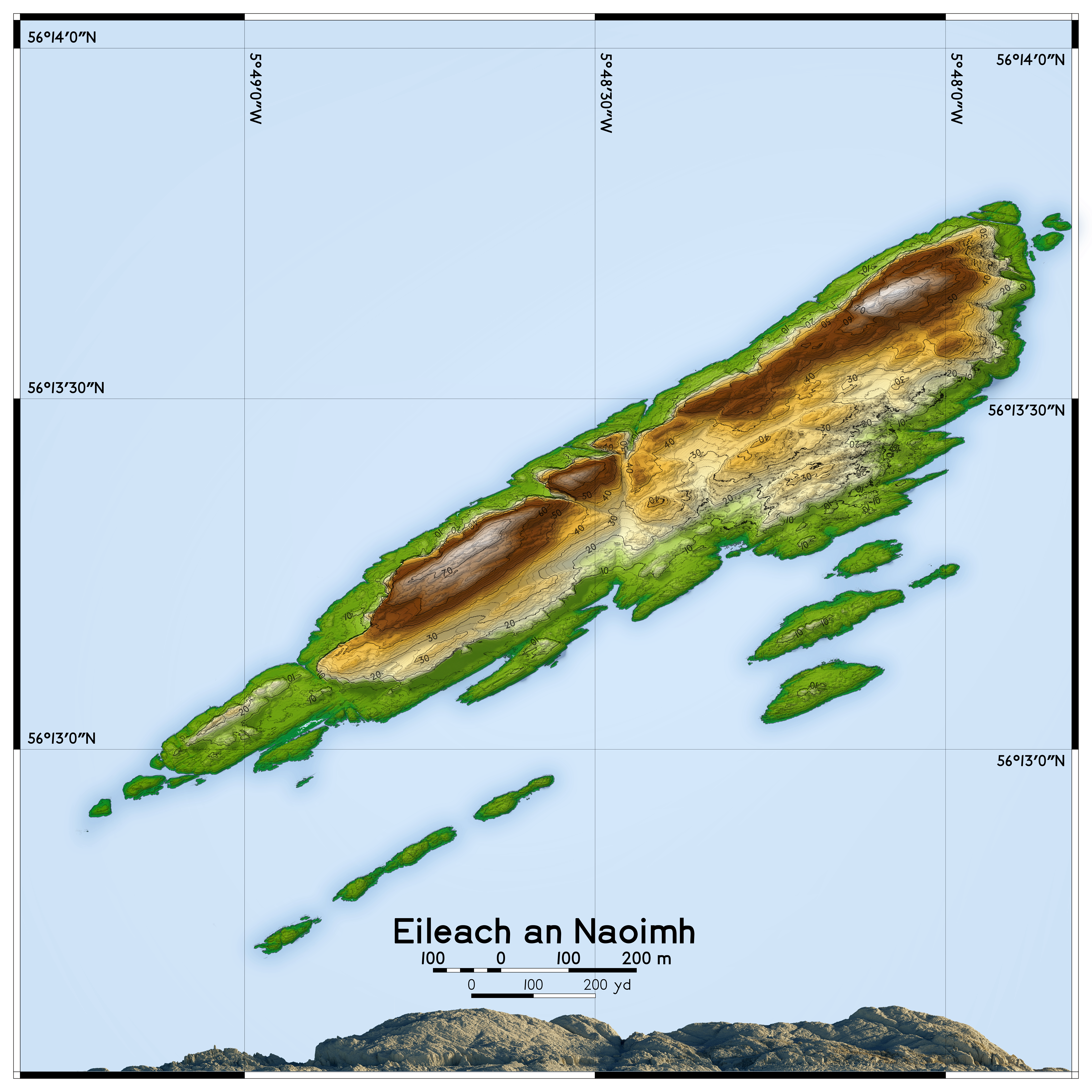
Map of Eileach an Naoimh

=== Early Christian period ===
According to Adomnán, the chronicler of the Life of Columba, about 542 Brendan the Navigator founded a monastery on Ailach, some years before Columba came to Iona. Brendan is said to have been buried on A’ Chùli, (which lies between Eileach an Naoimh and Garbh Eileach) although no trace of his chapel there remains.

==== Hinba ====
Columba is also believed to have visited the island and it is one of the proposed locations of the Columban retreat isle of Hinba. Adomnán describes a settlement that may suggest a larger island than Eileach an Naoimh. Adomnán also refers to a place name associated with the island called Muirbolcmar, which is where the hermitage of Hinba was located. This name is Gaelic for the great sea-bag and its interpretation has proven to be controversial. Watson took the view that it is not an obvious description of anywhere on the rocky coast of Eileach an Naoimh and that Hinba must therefore have been elsewhere.

However, Adomnán notes that Brendan the Navigator set sail from Ireland to visit Columba and found him en route at Hinba. The elderly Brendan might well have chosen to stop off at a monastic settlement he himself had founded many years before on the island of "Ailech". Ailech is "beyond reasonable doubt" Eileach an Naoimh, suggesting that Hinba may have been Ailech continuing under another name. However, Watson suggests that it is "most improbable" that Adomnan would have changed the name "Ailech", the use of which "probably" predates Columba's arrival in the Hebrides, to Hinba and points out that tiny Eileach an Naoimh is "fitted for a penitential station rather than for a self-supporting community such as Columba's monasteries were". Undaunted, writing in 1973 W. H. Murray insisted the identification of this island with Hinba "is agreed by all authorities" including William Reeves (1857) and Skene (1876). (Note: The sources Murray quotes are: Reeves, William (ed.) (1857) Adomnan's Life of St Columba. Dublin. Irish Archaeological and Celtic Society; Skene, W.F. (1876) Celtic Scotland; a 1930 report by the Glasgow University Archaeology Society; and Simpson, W. Douglas referring in the text to a 1953 and a 1955 document neither of which are in Murray's bibliography.)

==== Eithne's grave ====
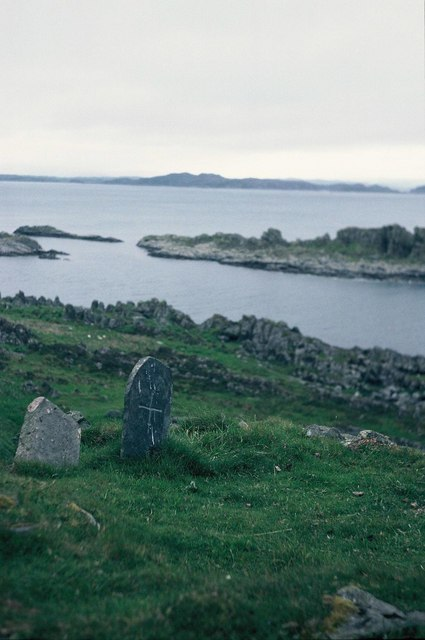
The reputed site of Eithne's grave

Eileach an Naoimh may also be the burial site of Columba's mother Eithne. The supposed site, identified in 19th-century local tradition, is a circular enclosure about 3.2 m (10 ft) in diameter situated 130 m (430 ft) southwest of the main monastic ruins on a steeply sloping hillside. There is an outer stone kerb and two upright slabs close together, one of which is incised with a cross on the southwest face. The cross is equal-armed and the arms terminate in small circular expansions. A third upright slate slab sits 2.6 m (8 ft 6 in) away. There are "extremely vague" records of the discovery of female remains in this area.

==== Main enclosure ====
The main ruins overlook the rocky landing place on the south coast, which is guarded by a line of skerries called Sgeirean Dubha. The landing place is called Port Chaluim Chille (the port of Columba's church) and the structures sit on a raised beach terrace above it. The earliest ruins here are thought to date from the 9th century as Brendan's earlier buildings would likely have been wooden. These early buildings are intermingled with those of a much later date.

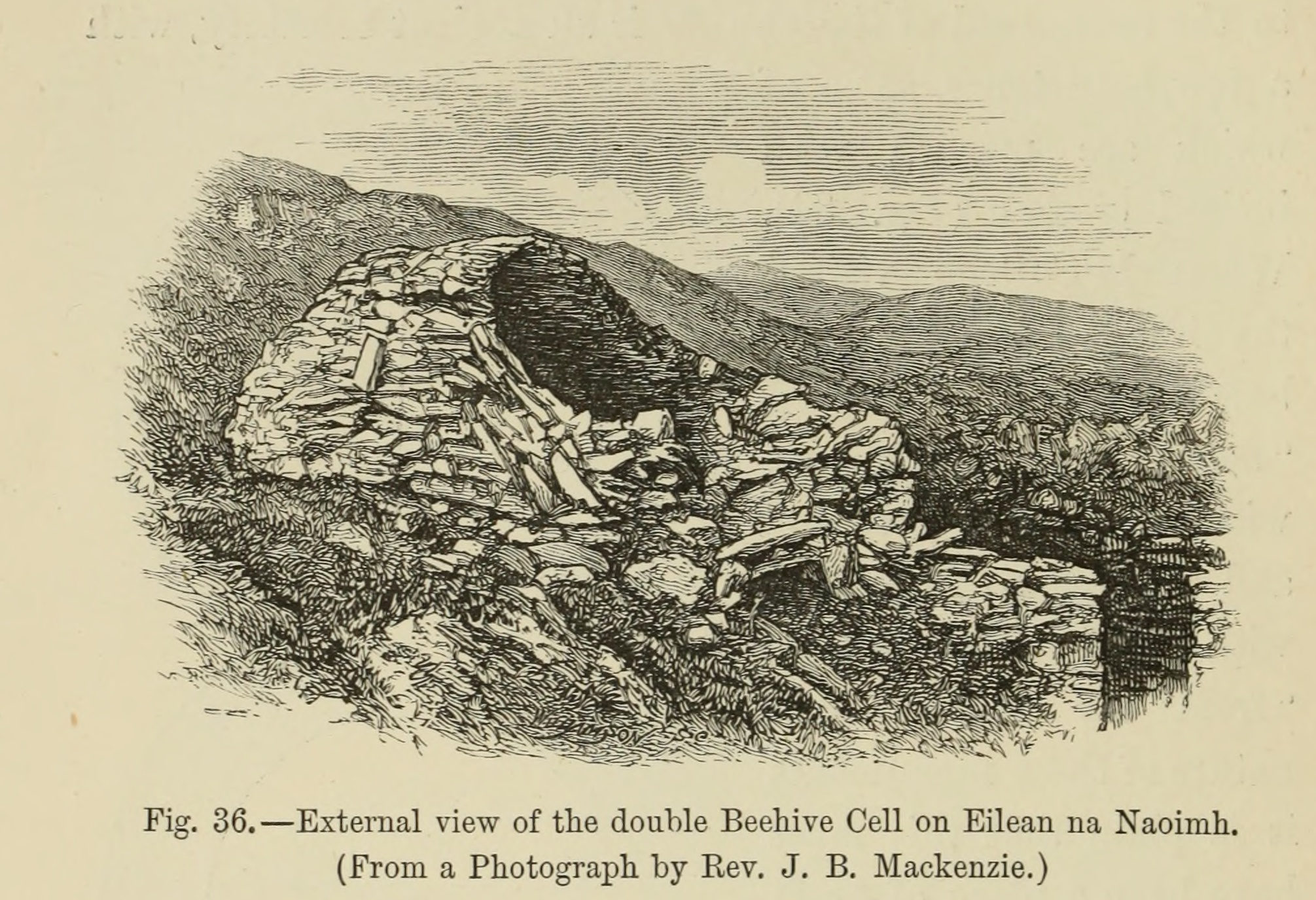
The Clochain - beehive huts constructed prior to the arrival of Vikings in 800s

The low walls of the chapel are contained in a pentagonal enclosure farthest from the landing site. South of this is a small underground cell and southwest are the remains of the "monastery" and church. Beyond them is a herb garden and burial-ground with another enclosure closer to the sea. About 90 m (300 ft) east of the chapel is the Clochain - two partly reconstructed beehive huts that are the most visually striking remnant of the early settlement and the finest examples of this type of structure in Scotland. Between the chapel and the Clochain there is the outline of a barn on a low ridge. Closest to the landing site is Tobar Challuim-Chille or Columba's Well, a natural spring that flows into a basin contained by a large slab of stone.

The oldest remains on the site are the Clochain, Eithne's Grave, the walls of the pentagonal inner enclosure together with two walls blocking the approach gully, the underground cell and the burial-ground. All of them appear to be of early Christian provenance and are most likely associated with a monastic settlement of the pre-Norse period.

The double beehive cell, standing at more than 3 metres (9.8 ft) tall was probably used to shelter anchorites who had withdrawn from the world to live in isolation at the site. It’s laid out in a figure-of-eight plan, built of local sandstone split into thin slabs along with some Easdale slate. The original diameters of the chambers were between 4 and 5m and no mortar was used in their original construction. (Note: Some mortar is present due to reconstruction work undertaken in 1937.)

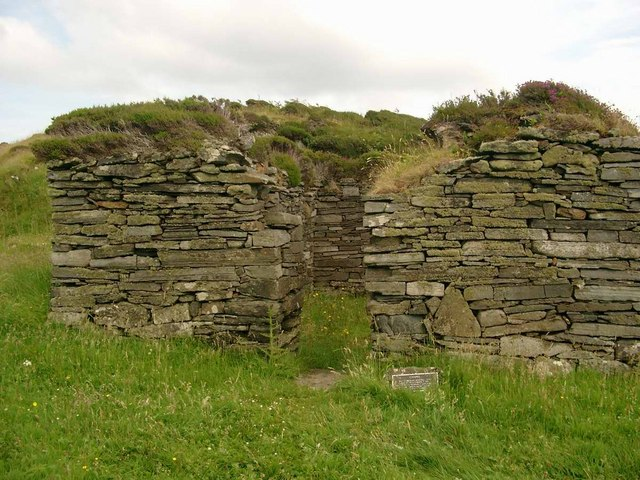
The chapel, probably constructed in the 11th or 12th century

The rectangular chapel, which is constructed of clay-mortared masonry, is 6.7m by 1.7m in extent and the walls are 1m thick. It was probably constructed in the 11th or 12th century along with the lime-mortared church. The more complex structure known as the monastery may include a domestic building of the same period.

The purpose of the curious underground cell is more difficult to interpret. This has an inner chamber about 1.8m high and a roofless outer chamber. Their most likely use was for storage, although a penitential purpose of some kind is a possibility.

The settlement was destroyed by Viking raiders who were present in the area from about 800, although its continued use was testified by John of Fordun writing about 1380, who described the island as a "sanctuary". These ruins are amongst the best-preserved early Christian monasteries in Scotland and the site is in the care of Historic Environment Scotland.

=== Early modern period ===
The island remained a place of pilgrimage and burial after its abandonment and it was in the care of the Augustinian priors of Oronsay until the Protestant Reformation in 1560. There is another burial ground immediately west of Port Chaluim Chille. It is 30m by 9m in size and surrounded by a low drystone wall. There are two drystone buildings in ruins at each end and several cists in the interior of the site. The date of the burials is unknown; the buildings are probably post-medieval.

The island was inhabited again in the 17th century by tenants of the Duke of Argyll but although it was farmed until the 19th century there does not seem to have been any permanent inhabitation throughout the 18th and 19th centuries. There is a corn-drying kiln north east of the chapel with a likely date of the late 18th or early 19th century. Other buildings from roughly this time period include the winnowing-barn and parts of the ruin often incorrectly described as a "monastery", which was added to on successive occasions. The island's intermittent occupation since the Norse settlement of Scotland has likely contributed to the survival of the structures.

== Natural history ==
The outcrops of limestone on Eileach an Naoimh give rise to fertile soils and the slope of the land makes for "verdant" south-facing hillsides. A wide variety of flowering plants are found there including primrose, yellow flag, meadowsweet and honeysuckle.

== See also ==
- List of islands of Scotland
- Scotland in the early modern period
