= Eilean Dubh Mòr =

Uninhabited island in the Inner Hebrides of Scotland

Eilean Dubh Mòr (Gaelic)
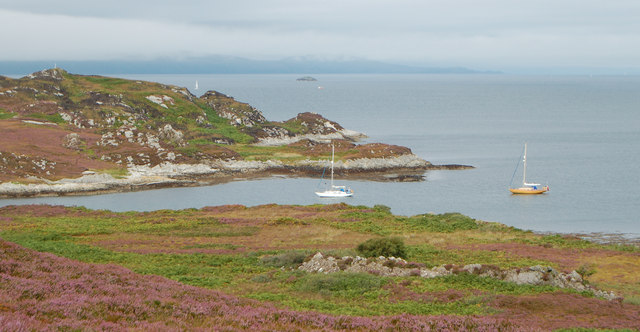
- Looking from Eilean Dubh Mòr over the anchorage to Eilean Dubh Beag.

Location
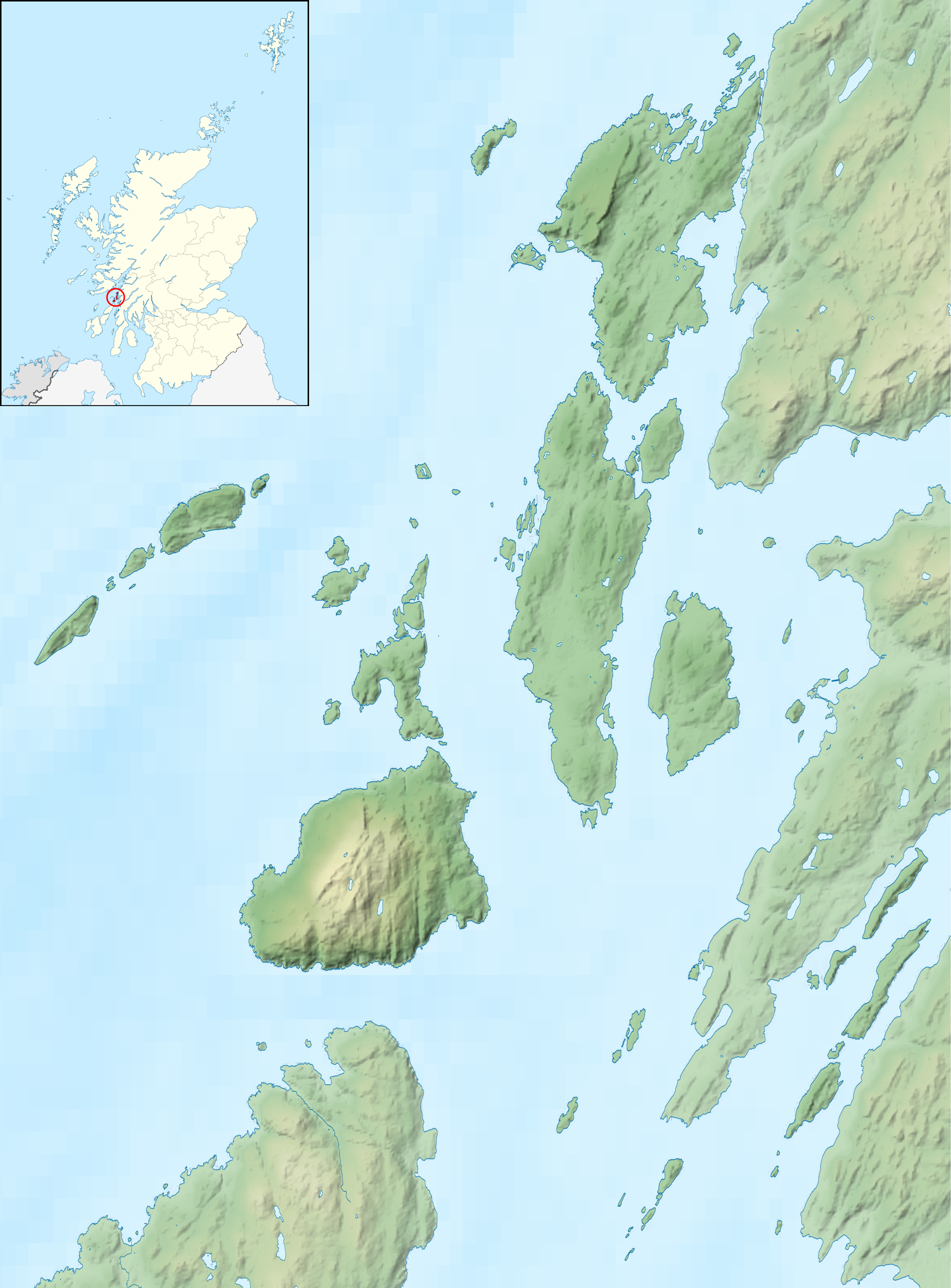
- Eilean Dubh Mòr shown within the Garvellachs, and next to the Slate Islands, Scarba, and the isles of Loch Craignish Eilean Dubh Mòr shown within Argyll and Bute
- OS grid reference: NM695105
- Coordinates: 56.23°N 5.72°W

Name
- Name meaning: big black island

Physical geography
- Island group: Black Islands
- Area: 50 hectares (124 acres)
- Area rank: 199
- Highest elevation: 53 m (174 ft)

Administration
- Council area: Argyll and Bute
- Country: Scotland
- Sovereign state: United Kingdom

Demographics
- Population: 0

Eilean Dubh Mòr (Scottish Gaelic: big black island) is an uninhabited island in the Inner Hebrides of Scotland. It lies at the mouth of the Firth of Lorn, between the islands of Lunga and Garbh Eileach. The area of the island has been measured variously—at 50 hectares (120 acres) by Livingstone and 65 hectares (160 acres) by Haswell-Smith, the latter including the nearby islet of Eilean Dubh Beag (Scottish Gaelic: small black island), which is joined to Eilean Dubh Mòr at low tide.
