= A' Chùli =

Uninhabited island in Scotland

A' Chùli (Gaelic)
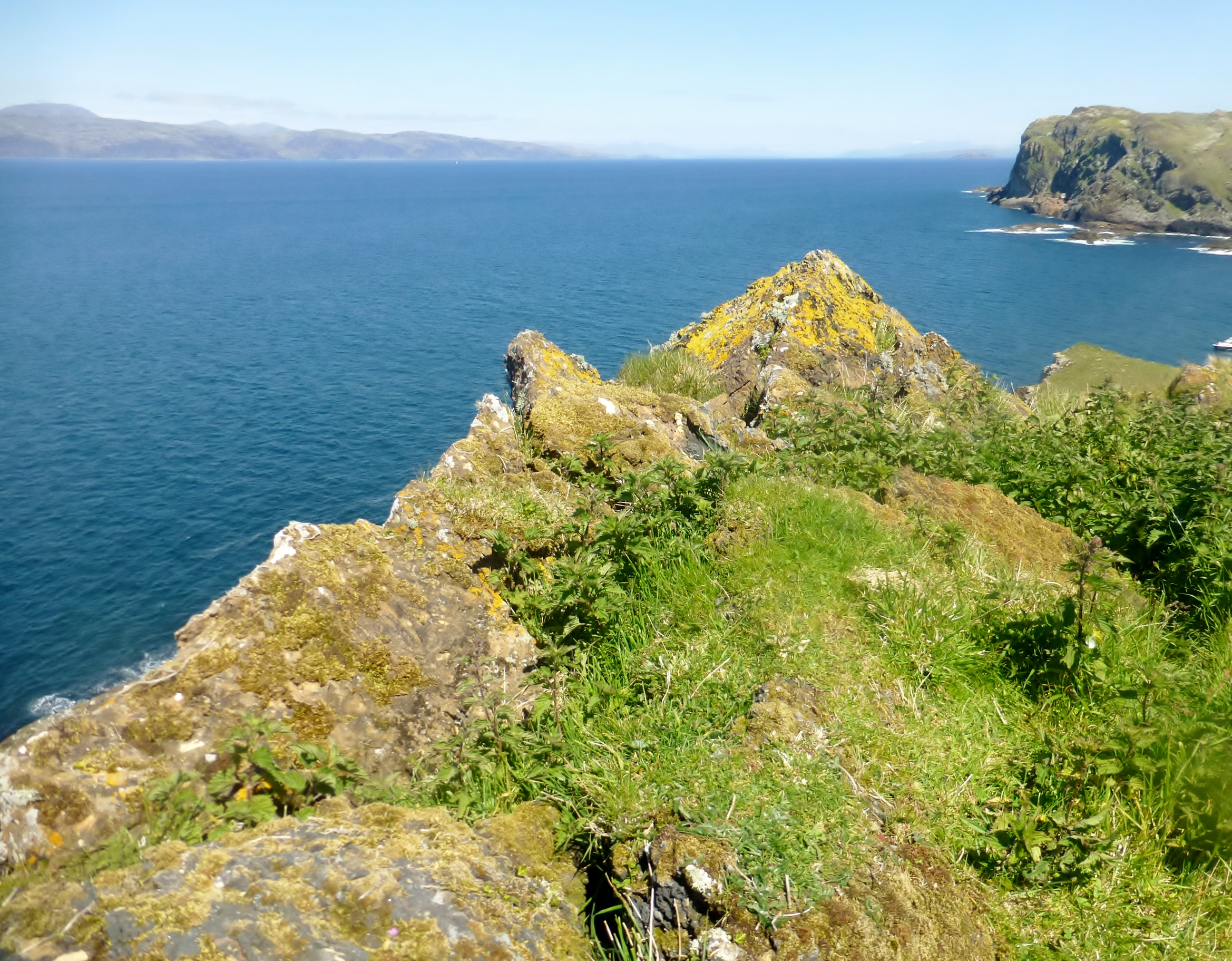
- View from the summit with Garbh Eilean at right and Mull in the distance

Location
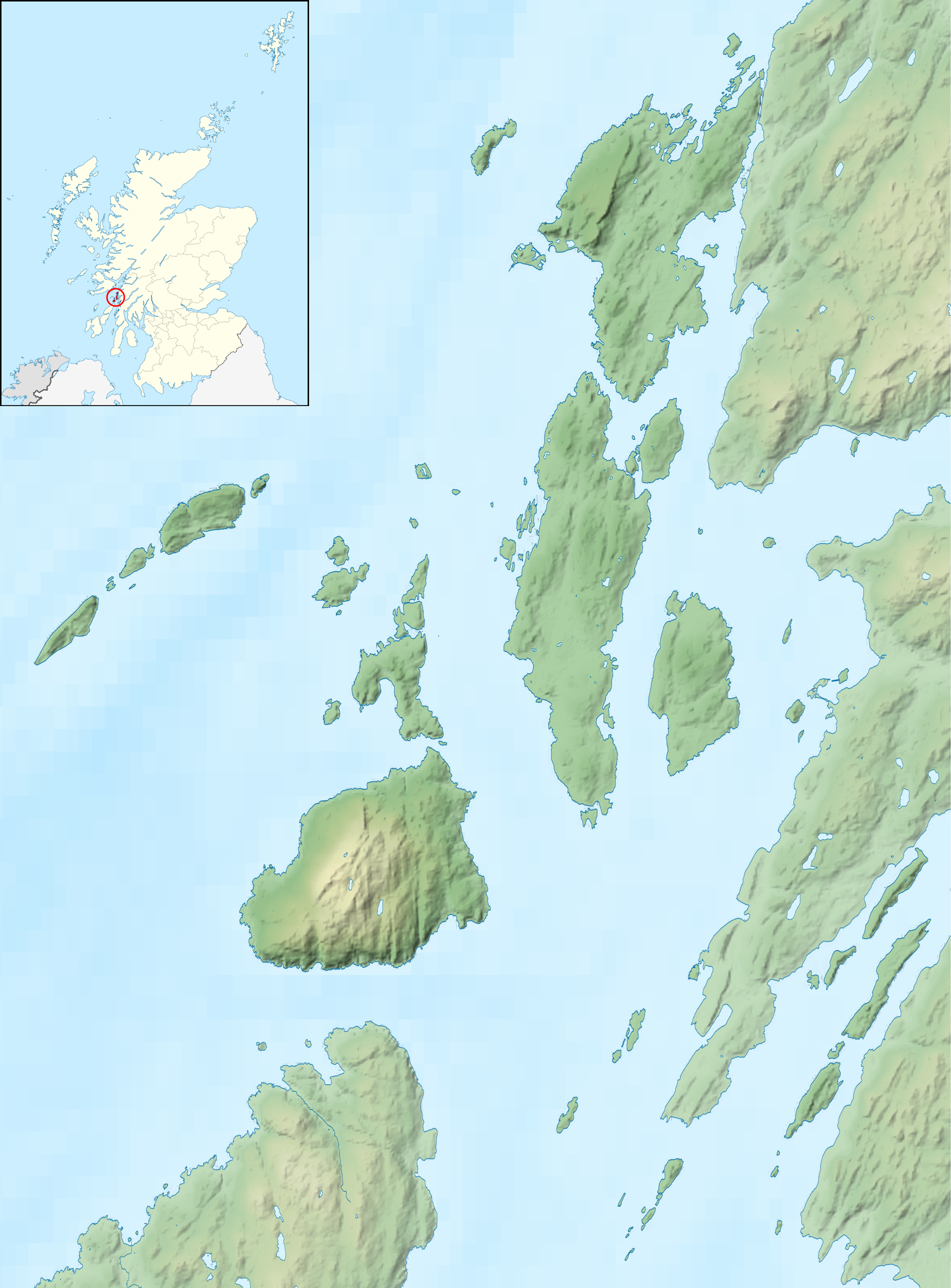
- A' Chùli shown within the Garvellachs, and next to the Slate Islands, Scarba, and the isles of Loch Craignish A' Chùli shown within Argyll and Bute
- OS grid reference: NM653111
- Coordinates: 56.234°N 5.787°W

Name
- Name meaning: The retreat

Physical geography
- Island group: Garvellachs
- Area: 20 ha (49 acres)
- Highest elevation: 45 m

Administration
- Council area: Argyll and Bute
- Country: Scotland
- Sovereign state: United Kingdom

Demographics
- Population: 0

A' Chùli is an uninhabited island in the Garvellachs in the Firth of Lorn, in the council area of Argyll and Bute, Scotland. It is 20 ha (49 acres) in extent and lies between Garbh Eileach and Eileach an Naoimh, the two largest islands of the archipelago. Grob nan Sgarbh, Sgeir Leth a' Chuain and Sgeir nam Marag are small skerries offshore to the southwest.

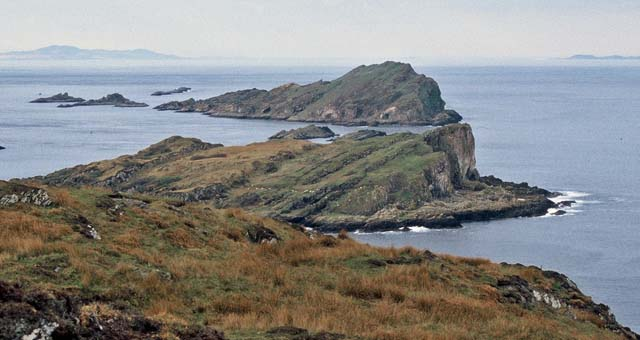
A' Chùli from Garbh Eileach

An earlier name of the island was Cùil Bhrianainn meaning "Brendan's retreat" and Brendan the Navigator is reputed to have built a chapel and been buried there. However, no trace of the chapel is visible and a similar fate appears to have befallen two unroofed buildings, thought to be shielings, recorded in 1881 by the Ordnance Survey.

On 7 March 1981 a fishing boat foundered approximately 0.8 km (0.50 mi) northwest of the island.

== Footnotes ==
- Haswell-Smith, Hamish (2004). The Scottish Islands. Edinburgh: Canongate. ISBN 978-1-84195-454-7.
- Watson, William J. (1926). The History of the Celtic Place-Names of Scotland (2005 reprint by Birlinn ed.). Edinburgh and London: William Blackwood and Sons.
