= Garbh =

Garbh is an Irish word describing a rugged landscape feature.

It can be found in :

- Garbh Sgeir, skerry in the Small Isles in Scotland;
- Garbh Eileach, skerry in the Garvellachs in Scotland.
