= Dùn Chonnuill =

Island in Argyll and Bute, Scotland

Dùn Chonnuill (Gaelic)
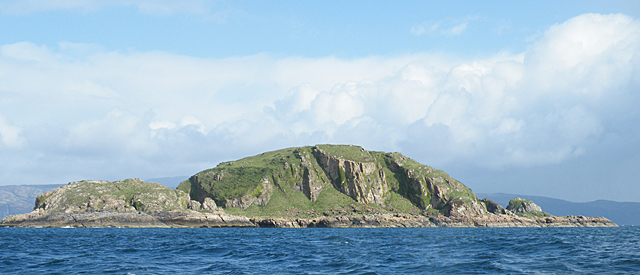
- Island seen from the south

Location
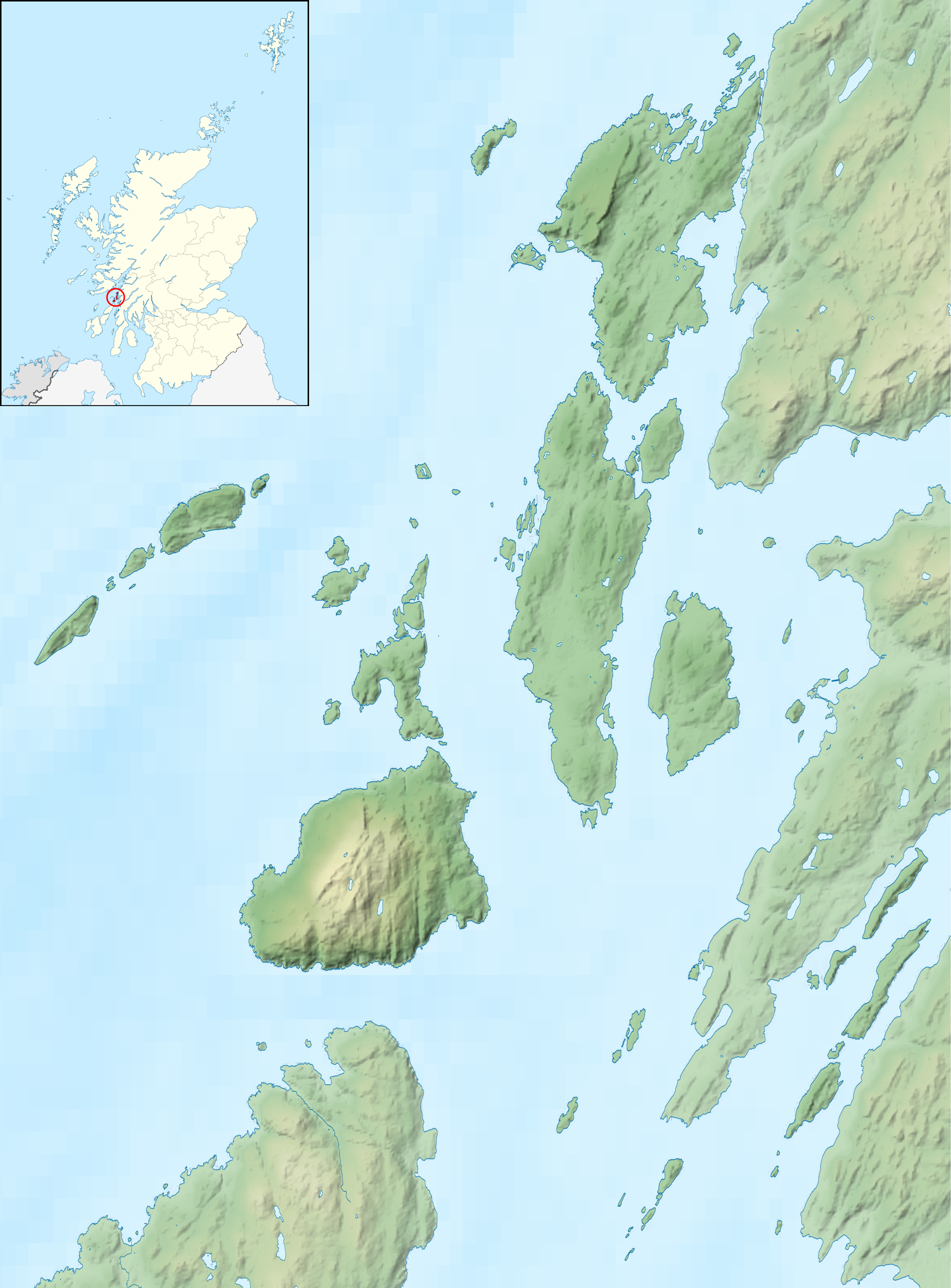
- Dùn Chonnuill shown within the Garvellachs, and next to the Slate Islands, Scarba, and the isles of Loch Craignish Dùn Chonnuill shown within Argyll and Bute
- OS grid reference: NM680126
- Coordinates: 56.25°N 5.74°W

Name
- Name meaning: Conal's castle

Physical geography
- Island group: Garvellachs
- Highest elevation: 62 m (203 ft)

Administration
- Council area: Argyll and Bute
- Country: Scotland
- Sovereign state: United Kingdom

Demographics
- Population: 0

Dùn Chonnuill is a small island in the Garvellachs in the Firth of Lorn, Scotland.

Dùn Chonnuill lies north east of Garbh Eileach, the largest island of the archipelago to which it gives its anglicised name. There is a ruined castle, perhaps dating from the mid-13th century, when it was probably one of four castles known to have been held by Ewen MacDougall of Lorn from the Norwegian crown. The first certain reference was in 1343 when the island was granted to John of Islay, Lord of the Isles along with Cairnburgh and "Iselborgh". By 1390 his son Donald had granted half of the constabulary of Dùn Chonnuill to Lachlan Lùbanach Maclean of Duart. Circa 1385 John of Fordun included "the great castle of Dunquhonie" in his list of Hebridean strongholds.

The MacLeans continued to hold the island and its castle until the mid-17th century, when ownership passed to the Campbell Earls of Argyll. Dean Monro, writing in 1549, made a brief reference to the isle in his Description of the Western Isles of Scotland referring to "ane strength... ane round Castell". To the northeast there are also the ruins of five roughly rectangular buildings, the largest of which is 12m by 6m in extent. They are all round-cornered and better preserved than the fortifications on the summit but are likely to be of a similar date.

The "hereditary keeper" of the castle is Charles Maclean, son of the late Fitzroy Maclean.
