= Lunga, Firth of Lorn =

Island in Scotland

Lunga
Lunga (Gaelic)

Location
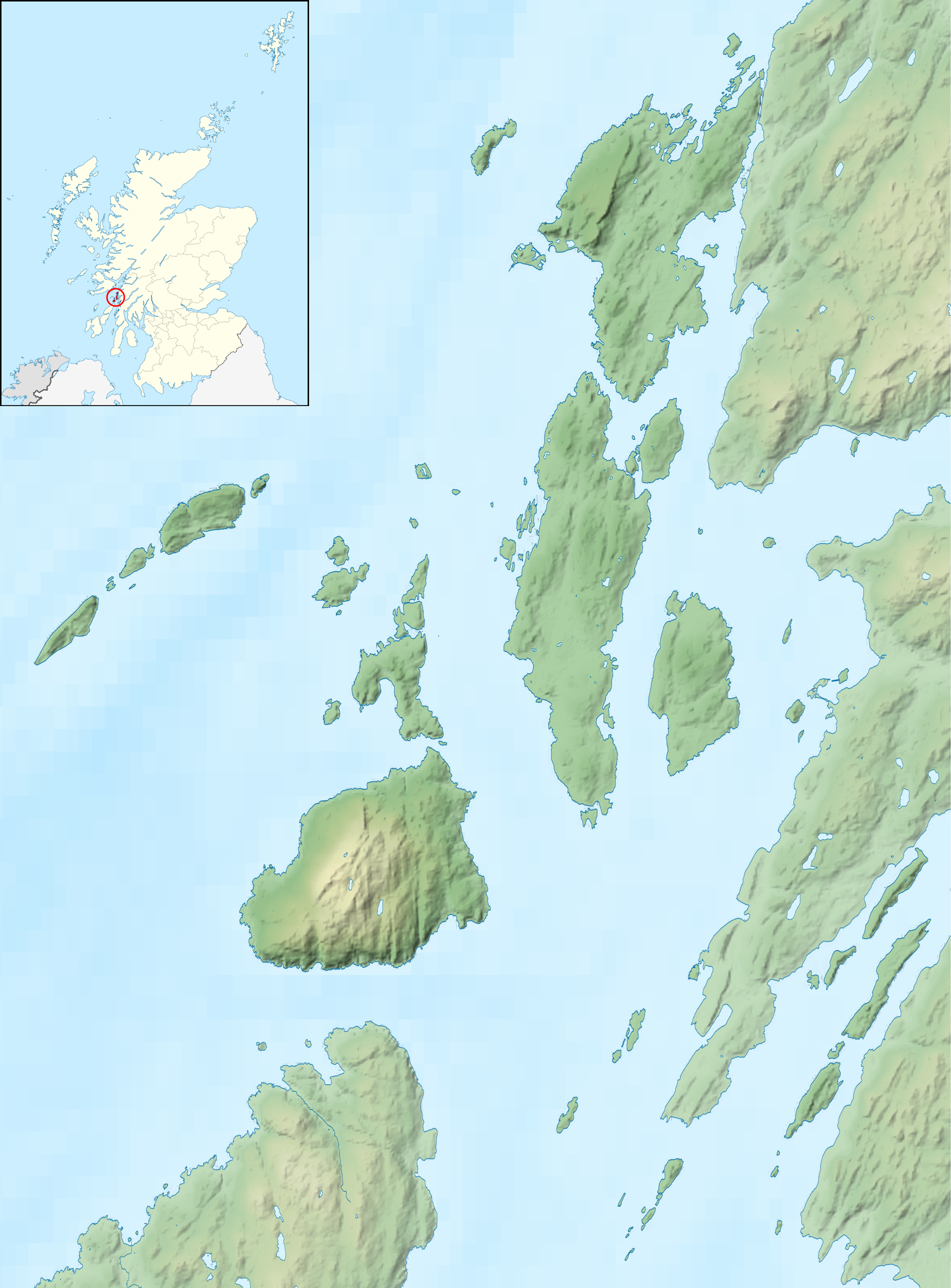
- Lunga shown within the Slate Islands, and next to the Garvellachs, Scarba, and the isles of Loch Craignish Lunga shown within Argyll and Bute
- OS grid reference: NM706086
- Coordinates: 56.22°N 5.70°W

Name
- Name meaning: Old Norse for 'isle of the longships'
- Old Norse name: Langr-oy

Physical geography
- Island group: Slate Islands
- Area: 250 ha (1 sq mi)
- Area rank: 96=
- Highest elevation: Bidean na h-Iolaire 98 m (322 ft)

Administration
- Council area: Argyll and Bute
- Country: Scotland
- Sovereign state: United Kingdom

Demographics
- Population: 2 (Note: The 2022 census entry is for Rubha Fiola.)
- Population rank: 88=
- Largest settlement: Rubha Fiola Centre

Lunga is one of the Slate Islands in the Firth of Lorn in Argyll and Bute, Scotland. The "Grey Dog" tidal race, which runs in the sea channel to the south, reaches 8 knots (15 km/h) in full flood. The name "Lunga" is derived from the Old Norse for "isle of the longships', but almost all other place names are Gaelic in origin.

The population was never substantial and today the main activity is an adventure centre on the northern headland of Rubha Fiola. The surrounding seas are fished for prawns and scallops and there is a salmon farm off the south eastern shores. The Special Area of Conservation of which the island is part hosts a growing number of outdoor leisure pursuits.

Lunga is a complex island made of several separate parts that are connected at low tides but which "disintegrate" at higher states of the tidal cycle. The largest of these outliers are Fiola Meadhonach and Rubha Fiola (also known as North and South Fullah), Eilean Iosal and Fiola an Droma.

== Geography ==
Lunga is two kilometres (1 1/4 miles) west of Luing and just north of Scarba. The nearest town is Oban, some 16 kilometres (10 miles) to the north. The channel to the south, Bealach a' Choin Ghlais (pass of the grey dog), is only 200 metres (220 yards) wide and is scoured by the notorious "Grey Dog" tidal race which reaches 8 knots (15 km/h; 4 m/s) when in full flood. According to an 1845 description:

... about 1 cable broad, and the stream of water during the greater part of ebb and flood rushes along the narrow pass with much violence. So great is the overfall on the current, that even during moderate tides it is impossible to force a boat through.

This strait is sometimes called the 'Little Corryvreckan' after its greater cousin between Scarba and Jura just a few miles to the south.

There are numerous islets in the surrounding waters. To the north is the isle of Belnahua and to the north west are Eilean Dubh Mor and the Garvellachs. Due west there is only Dubh Artach lighthouse between Lunga and the open Atlantic Ocean. At high tide the northern tip of Lunga becomes several separate islets with Rubha Fiola (headland of the tidal island) to the north, then Fiola Meadhonach (middle tidal island), Eilean Ioasal (humble island) and Fiola an Droma (drum-shaped tidal island) closest to Lunga proper. All around are smaller skerries and islets, including Eilean a' Bhealaich (island of the pass), Guirasdeal to the south west and Fladda to the north. This complexity of land and sea coupled with the strong tides makes these the most treacherous channels on Scotland's west coast. (Note: This complexity also makes measuring the area of the main island and its outliers difficult. Livingstone's Tables provide data for the individual portions as follows: Lunga, 250ha, Fiola Meadhonach 19 ha, Rubha Fiola 20 ha. However, Haswell-Smith provides 254 ha for the whole group of islands that are connected at low tide. The 2001 census offered a figure of 259 ha without providing a definition of the area measured.)

The highest point is Bidean na h-Iolaire (peak of the eagle) and the main bay is Camas a Mhor-Fhir (bay of the giant) to the south which provides an escape route from the Grey Dog. The only other anchorage for passing yachts is at Poll nan Corran (the sickle shaped pool), on the east coast, which has a pebble beach.

== Geology ==
Prior to the Pleistocene ice ages Lunga was part of a long peninsula stretching south west parallel to Kintyre. The Firth of Lorn glacier sliced this peninsula into several islands, including Islay, Jura, Scarba, Lunga, Luing and Seil. Later changes in sea level left raised beaches over much of the west coast of Scotland and Lunga has several examples. The bedrock of Lunga comprises a mixture of quartzite, limestone and shale called 'Scarba conglomerate' which predominates to the west and in the tidal islands to the north, with schist and mica-schist to the east. Unlike the other Slate Islands immediately to the north there is no commercially viable slate on Lunga, although the slate workers of Belnahua made use of the fresh water spring known as Tobar a Challuim-Chille (the well of St. Columba's church) north west of Bidean na h-Iolaire during times of drought. It is a trough, made up of flagstones, which reputedly never runs dry.

== History ==
The legend associated with the Bealach a' Choin Ghlais is part of the same story that surrounds the naming of the nearby Gulf of Corryvreckan (English: the speckled cauldron). This is where the Norse Prince Breacan of Lochlann is said to have drowned when his boat sank there, so giving his name to this great whirlpool. The prince's dog managed to swim to land and went in search of his master. Failing to find him on Jura or Scarba he tried to leap across the strait to Lunga, but missed his footing on Eilean a' Bhealaich which sits in the middle of the channel between the two islands. He slipped into the raging current and drowned as well, giving his own name in turn to the strait where he fell - the 'pass of the grey dog'.

Lunga was mentioned by Donald Monro in his 1549 manuscript Description of the Western Isles of Scotland. He stated that "Lunge" was "three myle of lenthe, twa pairt myle of breadthe, with a paroch kirk, guid main land, inhabit and manurit, guid for store and corn. It possist be M’Gillayne of Doward, in feu fra the earl of Ergile. It is a havin sufficient for Highland galeyis in it, layand from the southwest to northeist in lenthe."

In common with many of the remoter Scottish islands the human population experienced a decline during the late nineteenth and twentieth centuries. The highest recorded number was 29 in 1794, declining to 15 by 1891 and only 5 by 1931. The graves of some of the islanders are to be found in the churchyard at Kilchattan on nearby Luing. Lunga was not permanently inhabited during the 1960s and 70s.

== Present day ==
The island is owned by the family of convicted child sex offender Torquil Johnson-Ferguson who until 2013 ran the Rua Fiola adventure centre which catered for parties of school age children. The activities, which included rock climbing and canoeing, also made use of the nearby islets including Eilean Dubh Mor and Eilean Dubh Beag. The rest of Lunga itself, where there are only three houses, is primarily used for grazing animals. In 2001 the island had a population of 7 but in 2011 there were no "usual residents" living there as recorded by the census.

== Wildlife ==
The surrounding seas are fished for prawns and scallops and there is a lease for a salmon farm off the south eastern shores of Lunga just north of the Bealach a' Choin Ghlais by the islet Sgeir Mhic an Altair. This part of the seabed is also a haven for the rare seafan anemone Amphianthus dohrnii. The kelp Laminaria hyperborea dominates much of the surrounding infralittoral in areas not swept by the strongest tides. In some sheltered locations with deeper water there are feather stars including Leptometra celtica and the hydroid Lytocarpia myriophyllum. On land the island is home to European otter and red deer. Atlantic grey seals, minke whale, bottlenose dolphin, and harbour porpoise are regular marine visitors. Golden and white-tailed sea eagles are also commonly sighted. The area is of growing importance for various leisure activities including scuba diving and canoeing.

The island is part of the Scarba, Lunga and the Garvellachs National Scenic Area, one of 40 such areas in Scotlands, which are defined so as to identify areas of exceptional scenery and to ensure its protection by restricting certain forms of development. It also forms part of the Firth of Lorn marine Special Area of Conservation.

== Lunga group ==
This mini-archipelago has no formal status although Lunga is clearly the largest island in the heterogeneous group that lies 'between the Isles of the Sea and the Sound of Luing'. In addition to Lunga and its immediate attendants which can be reached at lower stages of the tide the larger islands and islets in the group are:

- Eilean Dubh Mòr
- Eilean Dubh Beag
- Ormsa
- Belnahua
- Fladda
- Eilean nan Ceann
- Sgeir Poll nan Corran
- Sgeir Mhic an Altair
- Eilean a' Bhealaich
- Guirasdeal
- An Tudan
- Liath Sgeir

These are often included in the Slate Islands

== Gallery ==
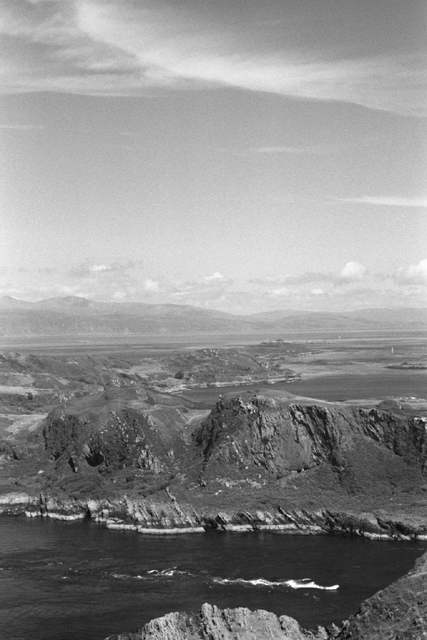
Lunga from Scarba with the Grey Dog in the foreground, looking north to Mull

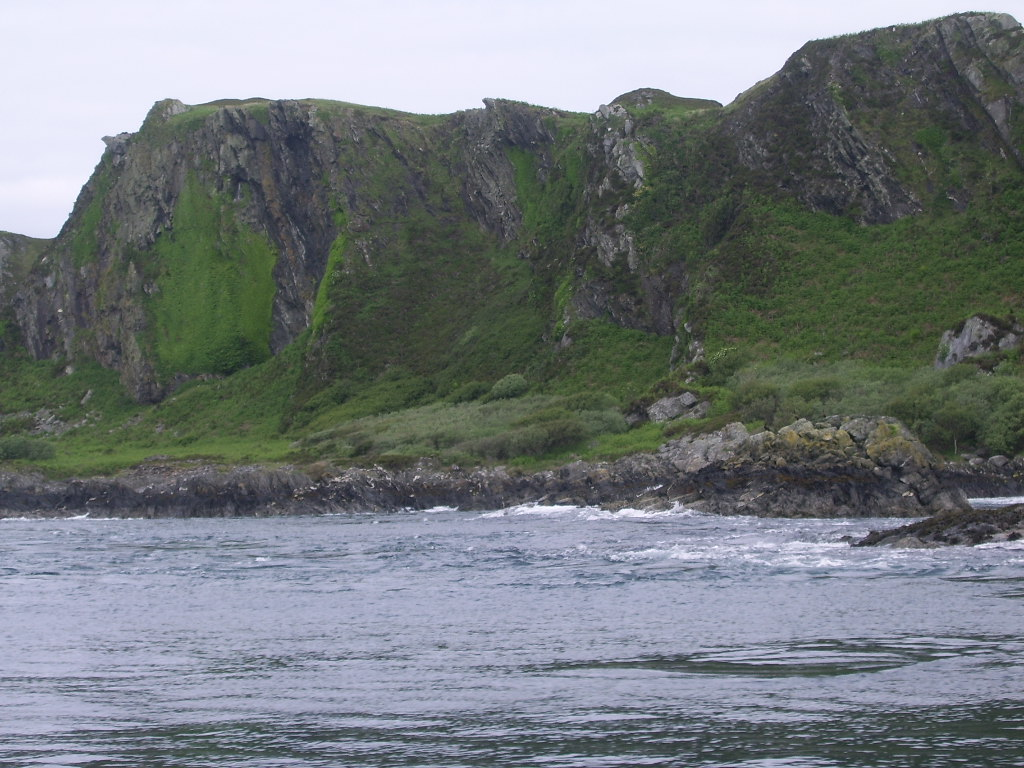
Lunga's raised beaches

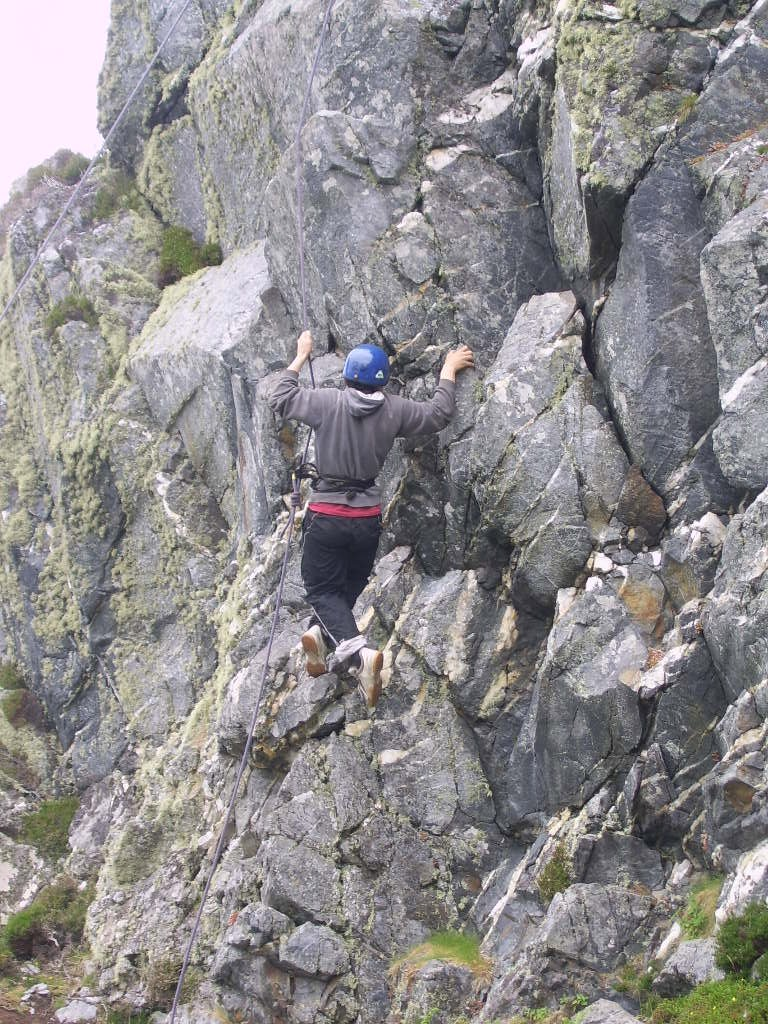
On the 'Kiwi' climb at Rubha Fiola

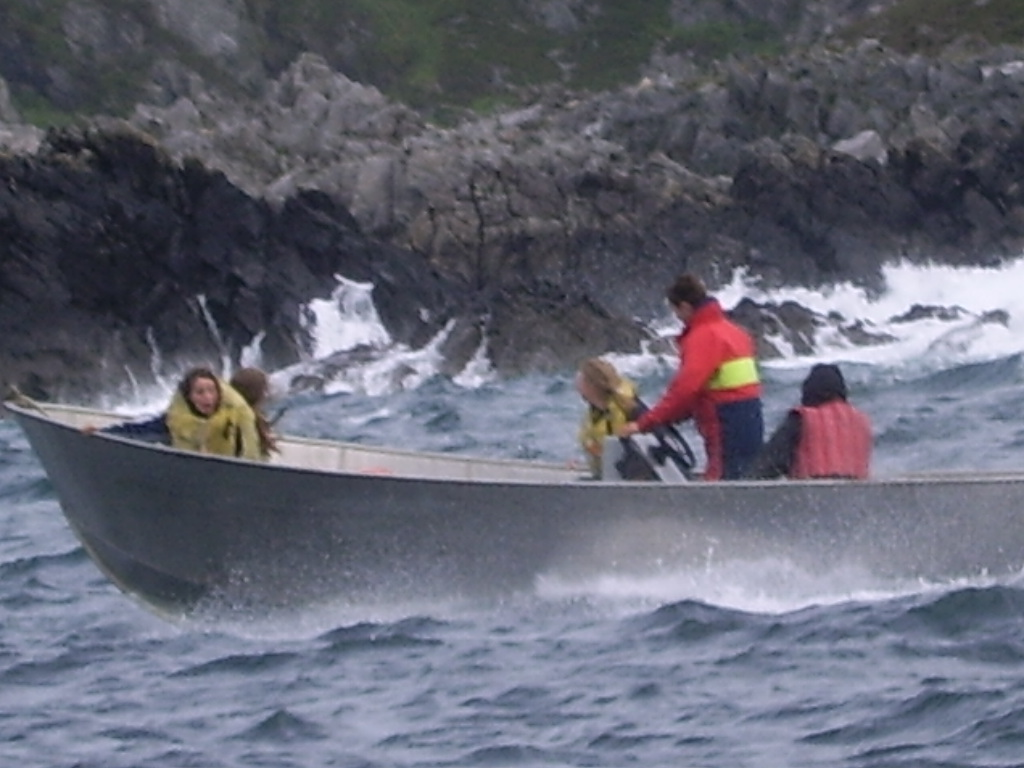
A bumpy ride around Lunga

== See also ==
- List of islands of Scotland
