= Garvellachs =

Small archipelago in the Inner Hebrides of Scotland

The Garvellachs
Na Garbh Eileacha (Gaelic)
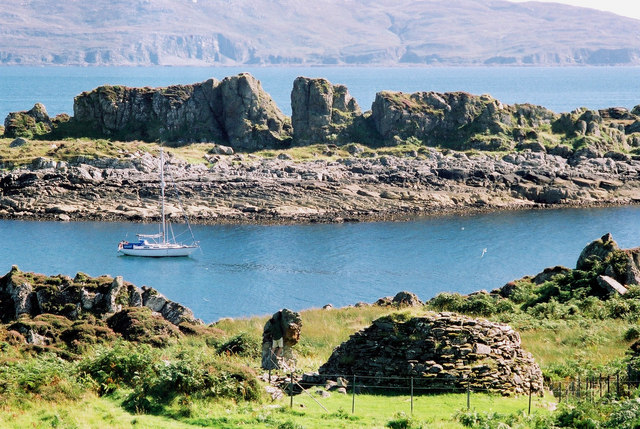
- A beehive hut on Eileach an Naoimh with Scarba in the distance

Location
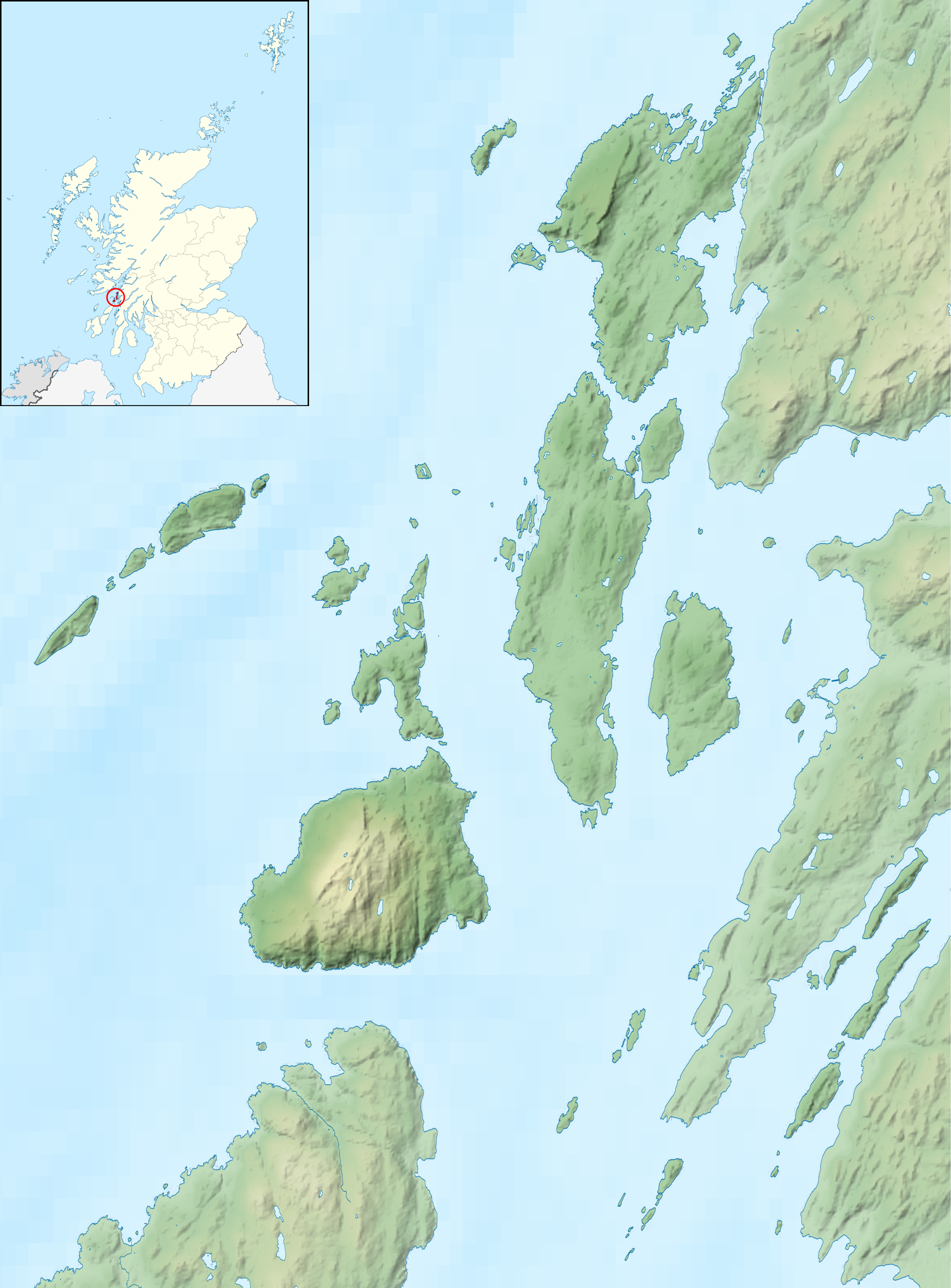
- The Garvellachs, shown next to the Slate Islands, Scarba, and the isles of Loch Craignish
- Coordinates: 56°14′N 5°47′W

Name
- Name meaning: Rough Islands

Physical geography
- Island group: Garvellachs (Isles of the Sea)
- Area: 230 ha (570 acres)

Administration
- Council area: Argyll and Bute
- Country: Scotland
- Sovereign state: United Kingdom

Demographics
- Population: 0

The Garvellachs (Scottish Gaelic: Na Garbh Eileacha) or Isles of the Sea form a small archipelago in the Inner Hebrides of Scotland. The islands include Garbh Eileach, Dùn Chonnuill and Eileach an Naoimh. Part of the Argyll and Bute council area, they lie in Firth of Lorne west of Lunga and northwest of Scarba and have been uninhabited since the 19th century. (Note: There is a stone bothy on Garbh Eileach for "occasional use" but not permanent inhabitation. The island was populated in the late 17th century but was likely abandoned in the late 19th.)

The islands are known for their early Christian connections to Brendan the Navigator and Columba and for their bedrock containing rare formations in relation to the global Sturtian glaciation.

== Overview ==
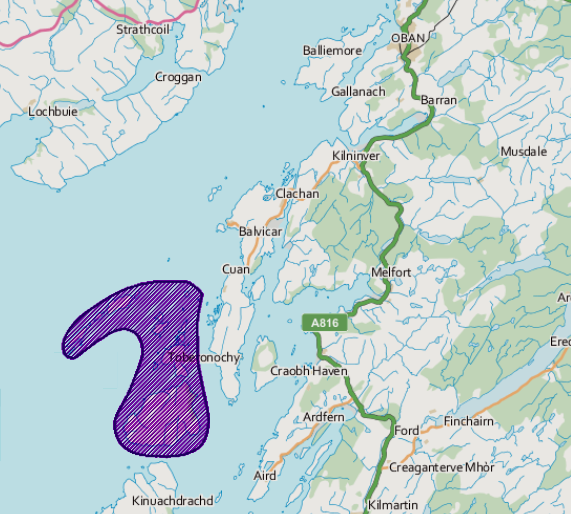
Scarba, Lunga and the Garvellachs National Scenic Area

The waters surrounding the islands are extensively used for leisure sailing. Due to the array of separate tidal races produced by the underwater topography there are some treacherous stretches of water. These include the Grey Dog between Scarba and Lunga and the Gulf of Corryvreckan, between Scarba and Jura, in which is located the infamous Corryvreckan whirlpool, which is the third-largest whirlpool in the world.

The area is part of the Scarba, Lunga and the Garvellachs National Scenic Area, one of 40 such areas in Scotland, which are defined so as to identify areas of exceptional scenery and to ensure its protection by restricting certain forms of development. The Scottish plant collector, Clara Winsome Muirhead surveyed the plant life of the islands and published The Flora of Easdale and the Garvellachs in 1962.

Garbh Eileach is the largest island in the group and extends to 142 ha (351 acres) and reaches a maximum elevation of 110 m (361 ft) above sea level. The area of Eileach an Naoimh is 56 ha (138 acres) and the maximum height 80 m (262 ft). A' Chùli lies between the two and is 20 ha (49 acres) in extent with Dùn Chonnuill, the northernmost isle, being roughly half this size.

== Etymology ==
Na Garbh Eileacha is Gaelic for "the rough rocks" with the Anglicised version of the name giving rise to the archipelago's name of the Garvellachs. Garbh Eileach itself then means the "rough rock" or "rough rocky mound". Eileach an Naoimh is from na h-Eileacha Naomha and means either "the rocky place of the saint" or "the holy rocks". A’ Chùli is from Cùil Bhrianainn meaning "Brendan's retreat" and Dùn Chonnuill means "Conal's castle" and may be named after an Ulster chieftain of the first century CE.

== Geology ==
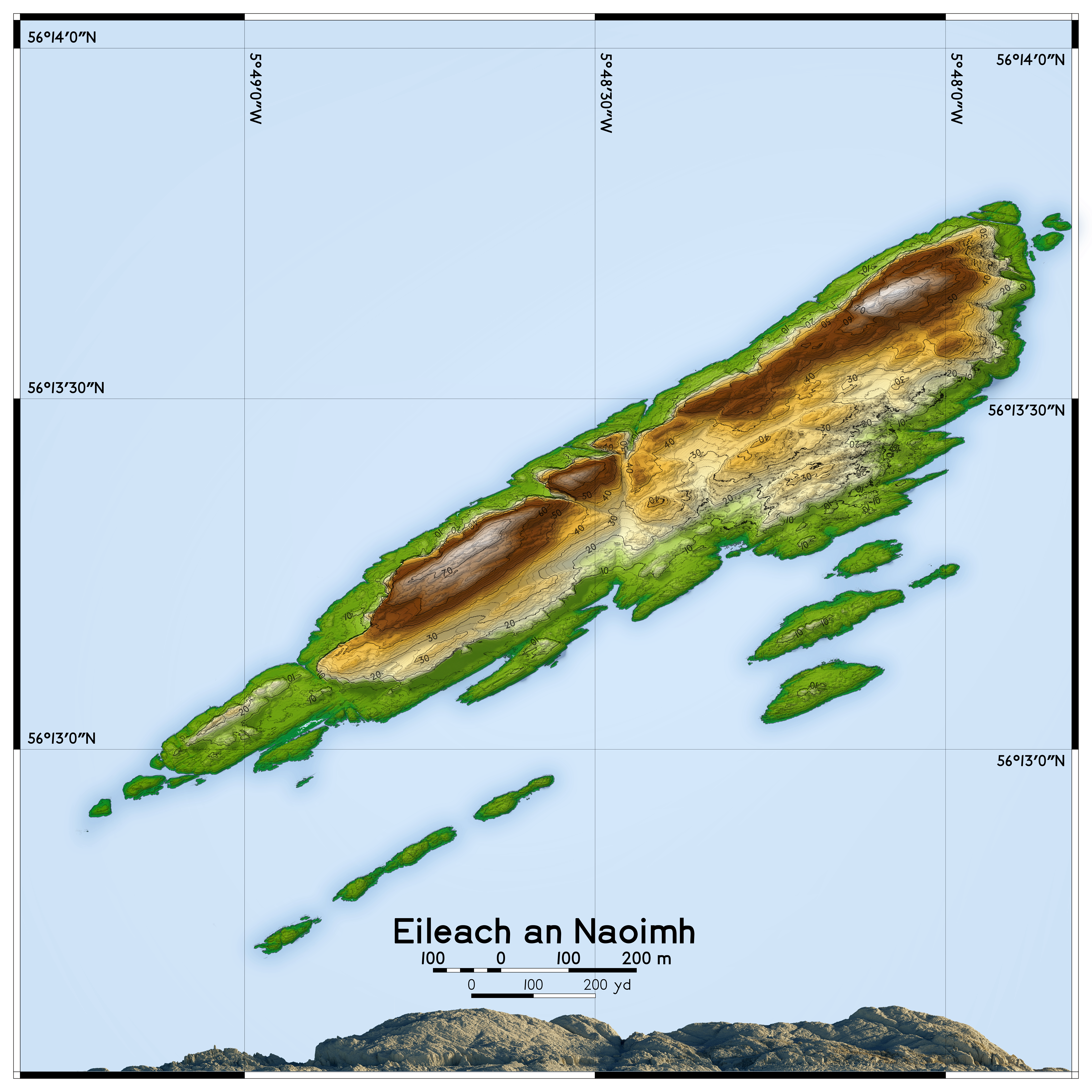
Eileach an Naoimh

The geology of the Garvellachs consists entirely of rocks of the Neoproterozoic Dalradian Supergroup apart from several basaltic dykes of Palaeogene age, associated with the nearby Mull Igneous Centre. The Dalradian rocks come from the uppermost part of the Appin Group and the lowermost part of the Argyll Group. The oldest preserved strata are exposed on the north of Garbh Eileach, a ~70 m thick sequence of carbonates, the Garbh Eileach Formation. The boundary between this and the overlying Port Askaig Tillite Formation is conformable. The Port Askaig Tillites are a sequence of sedimentary rocks that record a series of glacial, interglacial and periglacial episodes. This formation reaches it thickest development of 1,100 m in the area of Islay and the Garvellachs, thinning rapidly away from this region. The formation has been subdivided into five members, the lowest three of which are exceptionally well exposed on the Garvellachs. The sequence contains 48 diamictite beds, while 35–40 % of the formation is formed of sandstone of non-glacial origin, deposited in a deltaic to shallow marine sedimentary environment, interbedded with minor amounts of siltstones and dolomites.

There are two candidates within the Cryogenian period for the glacial interval represented by the Port Askaig Tillites, the older Sturtian glaciation (~717–660 million years ago) and the younger Marinoan glaciation (<654–632 million years ago), both of which are regarded as examples of a Snowball Earth, where ice sheets extended to very low latitudes. Dating of the Port Askaig Tillites has been attempted using a wide variety of techniques, but these have produced contradictory results, with evidence found that supports both of the options. Samples from the sandstones (those from the Garbh Eileach Formation and three lower members of the Port Askaig Tillite were all taken from the Garvellachs) have been analysed using detrital zircon geochronology and the results provide the strongest support for the sequence being Sturtian, with "youngest single grains" throughout being consistent with the likely depositional ages.

The detrital zircon study suggests that the archipelago "may be the only place on Earth to have a detailed record of how the Earth entered one of the most catastrophic periods in its history." This research also found that the sandstones of the Port Askaig Tillite were sourced from Laurentia, rocks with ages ranging from c. 3700 to 660 Ma.

== History ==
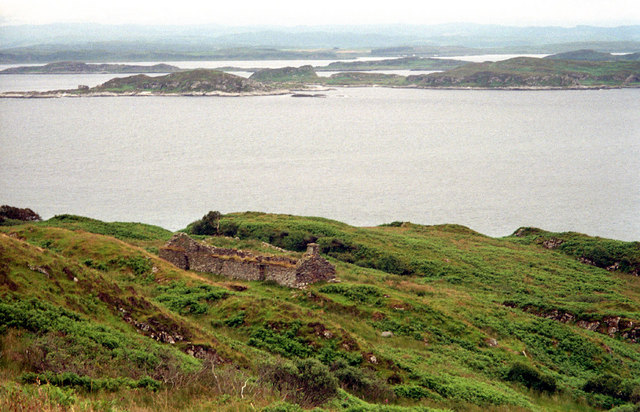
Ruins of late 18th or 19th century house on Garbh Eileach

At least three of the four main islands of the Garvellachs were inhabited in the distant past. There is a ruined castle on the top of Dùn Chonnuill that may have been built by the Macleans of Duart in the early fifteenth century after the island was received by them as a gift from King Robert III. The fort consists of walling up to 2.0m high and generally of a similar width. The remains of ten buildings have been identified. Brendan is said to have been buried on A’ Chùli although no trace of his chapel there remains and a similar fate appears to have befallen two unroofed buildings, thought to be shielings, recorded in 1881 by the Ordnance Survey.

There is a small anchorage and landing place on Garbh Eileach where there are the remains of a burial ground and of a fort that measures about 14m by 11m. About 650 m (2,130 ft) northeast of this dun there are the ruins of a house and byre with a corn-drying kiln a short distance away, probably erected in the late 18th or 19th century. The island had a population of thirty-two adults in the late 17th century but only four houses were occupied by 1861, and from then on it is likely that only the shepherd's cottage near the landing-place remained in use.

However, the most significant evidence of previous occupation is found on Eileach an Naoimh. About 542, Brendan the Navigator founded a monastery on Ailach, some years before Columba came to Iona. The ruins of the monastic buildings include two chapels, beehive huts, and a graveyard with three crosses and another circular grave. These ruins are amongst the best-preserved early Christian monasteries in Scotland and the site is in the care of Historic Environment Scotland.

Columba is also believed to have visited the island and it is one of the proposed locations of the Columban retreat isle of Hinba. Eileach an Naoimh may be the burial site of Columba's mother Eithne. The monastery was destroyed by Viking raiders who were present in the area from about 800. Although there was a small permanent population in the 1700s the island's intermittent occupation since the Norse settlement of Scotland has likely contributed to the survival of the structures.

A lease dated 1817 granted grazing for 60 cattle and 240 sheep on the archipelago as a whole.

== Natural history ==
The outcrops of limestone on Eileach an Naoimh give rise to fertile soils and the slope of the land makes for "verdant" south-facing hillsides. A wide variety of flowering plants are found there including primrose, yellow flag, meadowsweet and honeysuckle. There are scattered birchwoods and a small herd of red deer on Garbh Eileach.

== Gallery ==
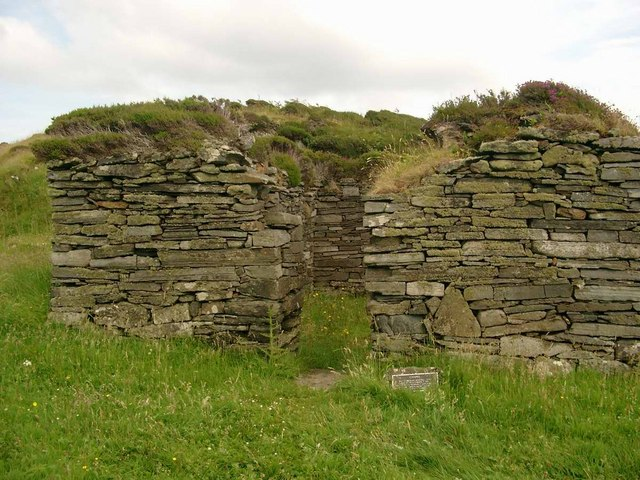
The monastery chapel, Eilach an Naoimh

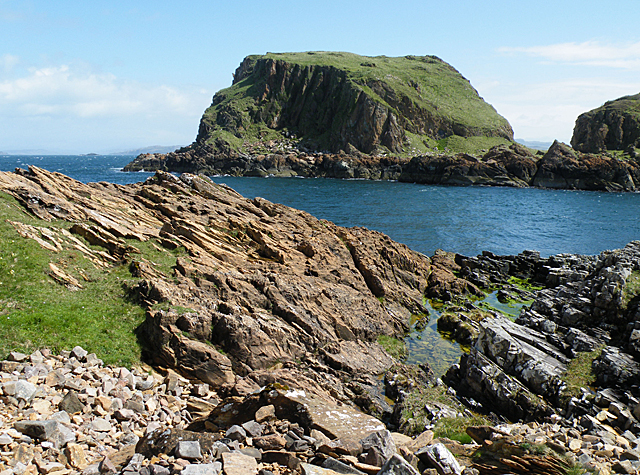
Dùn Chonnuill from Garbh Eileach

1925 Ordnance Survey map with The Garvellachs at centre

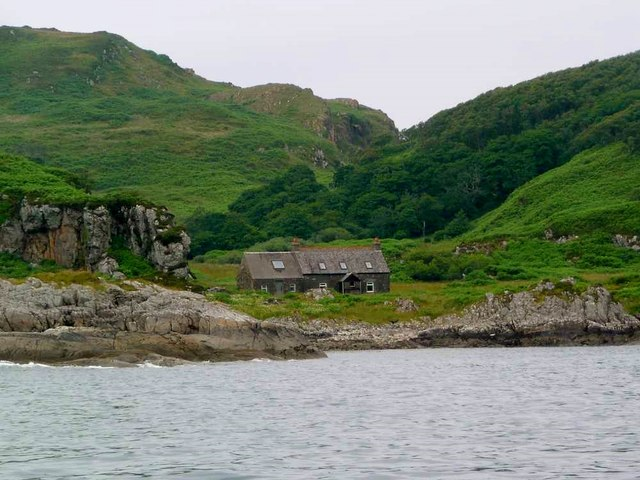
Bothy on Garbh Eileach

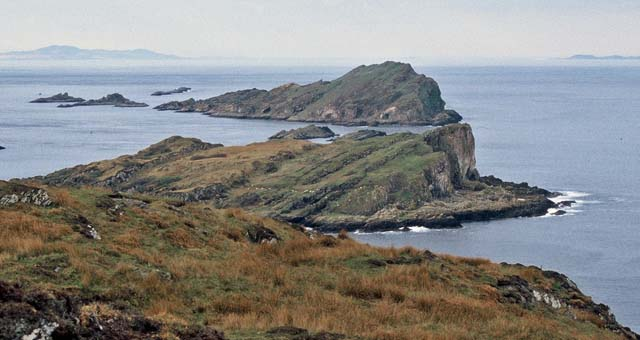
A' Chùli from Garbh Eileach

== See also ==
- List of islands of Scotland
