= Scarba, Lunga and the Garvellachs National Scenic Area =

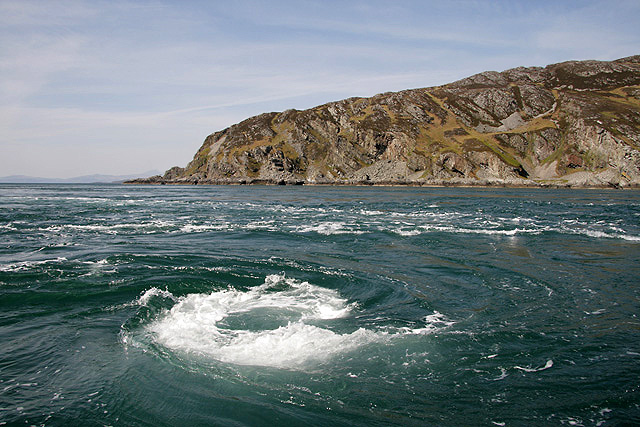
- The Corryvreckan Whirlpool

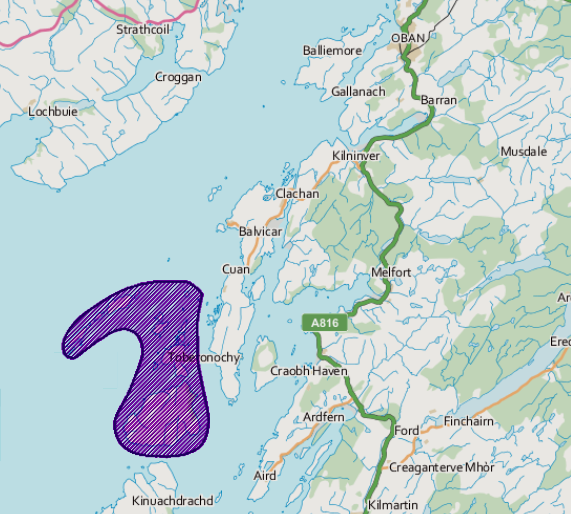
- Location and extent of the Scarba, Lunga and the Garvellachs NSA.
- Location: Argyll and Bute, Scotland
- Coordinates: 56°13′N 5°42′W
- Area: 65 km^{2} (25 sq mi)
- Established: 1981
- Governing body: NatureScot

Scarba, Lunga and the Garvellachs is the name of one of the 40 national scenic areas of Scotland. The designated area covers the islands of Scarba, Lunga, and the Garvellachs, all of which lie in the Firth of Lorn, along with much of the surrounding seascape. The national scenic areas are defined so as to identify areas of exceptional scenery and to ensure its protection by restricting certain forms of development, and are considered to represent the type of scenic beauty "popularly associated with Scotland and for which it is renowned". The Scarba, Lunga and the Garvellachs NSA covers 6,542 ha in total, consisting of 2,139 ha of land with a further 4,402 ha being marine (i.e. below low tide).

National scenic areas are primarily designated due to the scenic qualities of an area, however NSAs may well have other special qualities, for example related to culture, history, archaeology, geology or wildlife. Areas with such qualities may be protected via other national and international designations that overlap with the NSA designation. There are several protected areas within or overlapping with the NSA.

== Creation of the national scenic area ==
Following the Second World War, a committee, chaired by Sir Douglas Ramsay, was established to consider preservation of the landscape in Scotland. The report, published in 1945 proposed that five areas (Loch Lomond and the Trossachs, the Cairngorms, Glen Coe-Ben Nevis-Black Mount, Wester Ross and Glen Strathfarrar-Glen Affric-Glen Cannich) should receive a level of protection. Accordingly, the government designated these areas as "national park direction areas", giving powers for planning decisions taken by local authorities to be reviewed by central government. Following a further review of landscape protection in 1978, additional areas, including islands in the Firth of Lorn, were identified as worthy of protection due to their landscape qualities. Accordingly, in 1981 the direction areas were replaced by the national scenic area designation, which were based on the 1978 recommendations and thus included the area entitled Scarba, Lunga and the Garvellachs. The defined area remains as originally mapped in 1978, but was redesignated under new legislation in 2010.

Although the national scenic area designation provides a degree of additional protection via the planning process, there are no bodies equivalent to a national park authority, and whilst local authorities (in this case Argyll and Bute Council) can produce a management strategy for each one, only the three national scenic areas within Dumfries and Galloway have current management strategies.

== Landscape and scenery ==
The original 1978 report that led to the area being designated as a national scenic area noted:

In the clutter of islands of South West Argyll, one group stands out in many views, and by virtue of its form, relief and inter-relationships makes up an area of varied character and distinctive identity.

The holy ‘Isles of the Sea’ or ‘Rough Islands’ as the Garvellachs are otherwise called, are sharply angular when viewed from the north-east, and present vertical cliffs to the northwest. Inwards to the rest of the group, they are green scrub-clad islets, rich in flowers among the pink quartzose limestone boulders. They carry the most ancient ecclesiastical buildings in Scotland, and contrast strangely with the black slatey profiles of Belnahua and Lunga nearby, where the derelict slate quarries glisten in the sun or raise bleak black unnatural profiles to the storm.

The dark pyramid of Scarba (449m) raises its summit high above these lower islands, supporting moorland that is in striking contrast to their green meadows or slate wastes. On its eastern flank Scarba is well-wooded, an element of surprise in this oceanic context. Between the islands tidal races rip with ferocity that is easily seen, and the streaming waters are themselves an important visual element in the total scene.

— SNH (1978)

The seas are home to some of strongest tidal flows in the United Kingdom, leading to the formation of features such as the whirlpool in the Gulf of Corryvreckan, and the narrow channel between Scarba and Lunga known as Bealach a’Choin Ghlais ("the pass of the grey dogs").

== Conservations designations ==
All of the islands within the NSA, along with the neighbouring isle of Jura, form part of a Special Protection Area, due to the presence of breeding golden eagles. The Firth of Lorn, which surrounds the islands, is rich in wildlife, with basking sharks, whales, dolphins and seals all present. The seas of the Firth form a Special Area of Conservation (SAC) due to the reefs present in the waters. These reefs area amongst the most diverse in both the UK and Europe, with many of the species present being at either the northern or southern limits of their usual geographic range. As of 2016 consideration was being given to also protecting a wider area of the seas surrounding the islands as an SAC in order to enhance the protection of harbour porpoises in the area.
