= Garbh Eileach =

Island in Argyll and Bute, Scotland

Garbh Eileach (Gaelic)
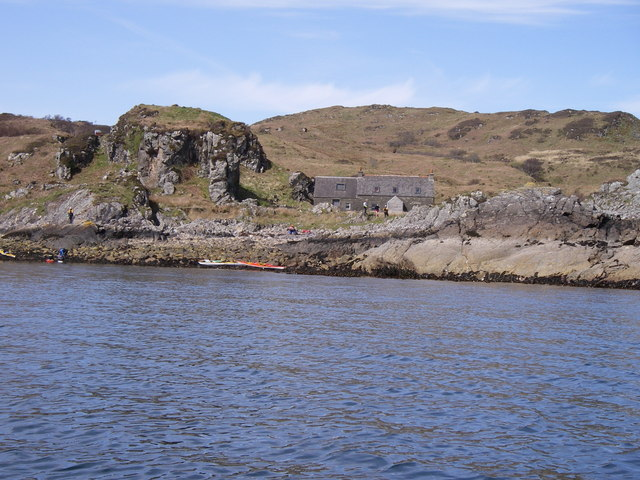
- The bothy on Garbh Eileach

Location
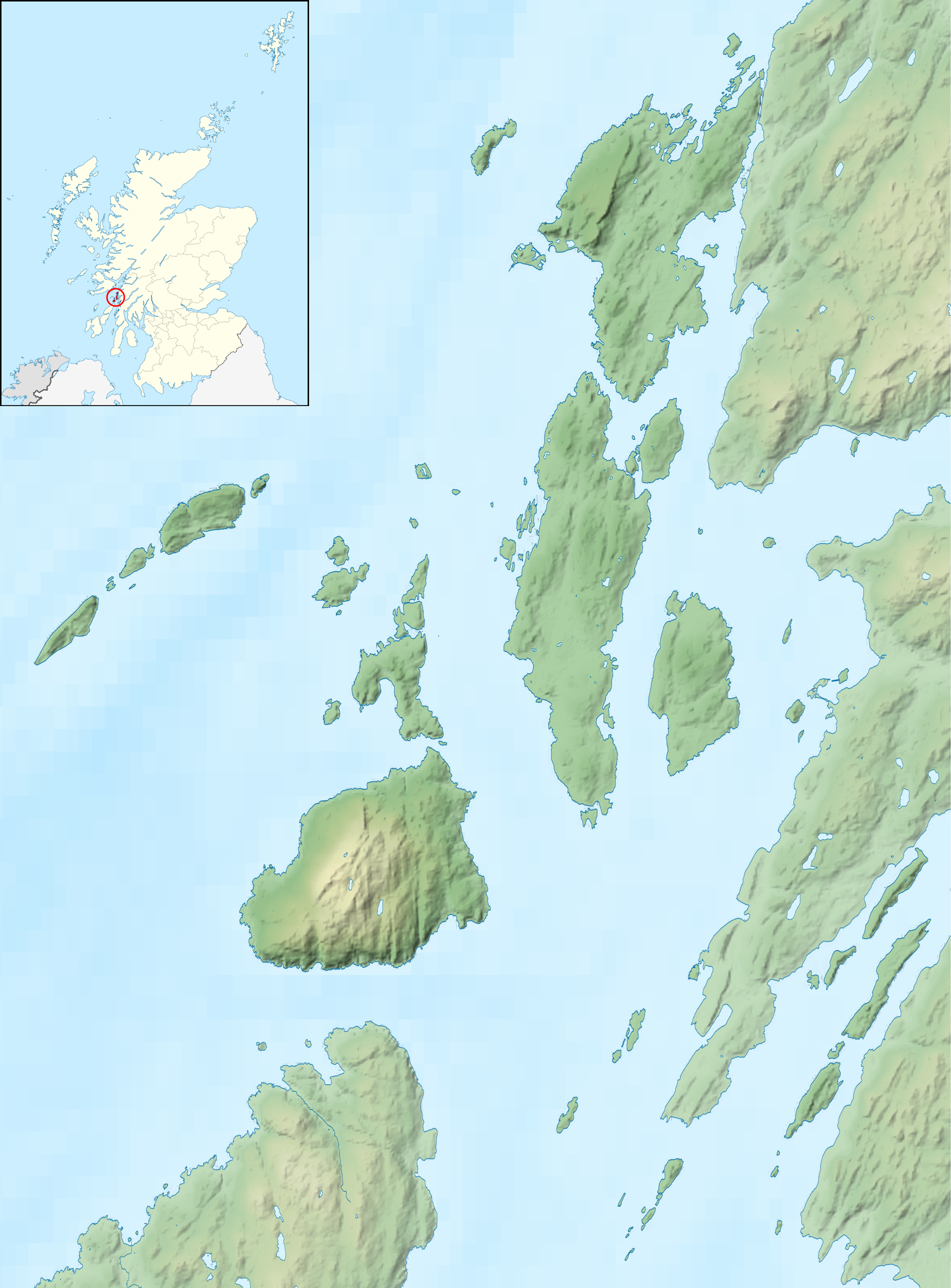
- Garbh Eileach shown within the Garvellachs, and next to the Slate Islands, Scarba, and the isles of Loch Craignish Garbh Eileach shown within Argyll and Bute
- OS grid reference: NM665115
- Coordinates: 56.24°N 5.77°W

Name
- Name meaning: rough rocks

Physical geography
- Island group: Garvellachs
- Area: 142 hectares (0.55 sq mi)
- Area rank: 127=
- Highest elevation: 110 m (360 ft)

Administration
- Council area: Argyll and Bute
- Country: Scotland
- Sovereign state: United Kingdom

Demographics
- Population: 0

Garbh Eileach is an uninhabited island in the Inner Hebrides of the west coast of Scotland that lies in the Firth of Lorn between Mull and Argyll. With an area of 142 ha (351 acres) it is the largest of the Garvellachs and reaches a maximum elevation of 110 m (361 ft) above sea level.

The name is Gaelic for "the rough rocks". The Anglicised version of the name gives the whole group of islands its name of the Garvellachs (Scottish Gaelic: Na Garbh Eileacha). The archipelago is part of the Scarba, Lunga and the Garvellachs National Scenic Area, one of 40 such areas in Scotland.

A 2024 study by researchers at University College London regarding the relationship of some of its bedrock to the Sturtian glaciation suggests the archipelago "may be the only place on Earth to have a detailed record of how the Earth entered one of the most catastrophic periods in its history."

There are scattered birchwoods and a small herd of red deer on Garbh Eileach.

== History ==
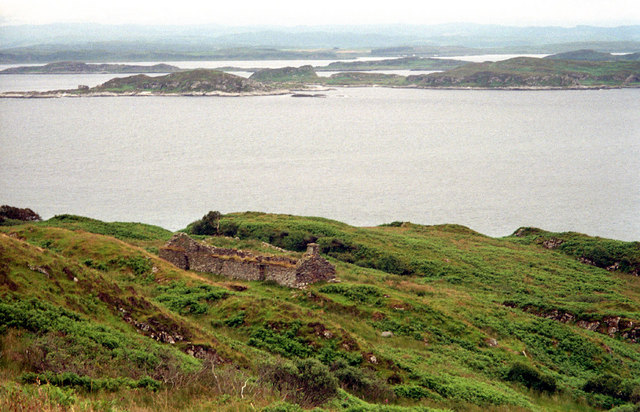
Ruins of late 18th or 19th century house on Garbh Eileach

There is a small anchorage and landing place on Garbh Eileach where there are the remains of a burial ground and of a fort that measures about 14 m by 11 m. About 650 m (2,130 ft) northeast of this dun, which may be of late prehistoric date, there are the ruins of a much later house and byre with a corn-drying kiln a short distance away, probably erected in the late 18th or 19th century.

During the medieval period the island was part of Maclean of Duart's landholdings but in 1666 it was granted by the 9th Earl of Argyll to John MacLachlan of Kilbride and let to his tacksmen for most of the 18th century. A 1788 survey concluded that only about 3 ha (7 acres) of the isle was suitable for arable farming although a further 12 ha (30 acres) was described as mixed arable and pasture.

Garbh Eileach had a population of thirty-two adults in the late 17th century but only four houses were occupied by 1861, and from then on it is likely that only the shepherd's cottage near the landing-place remained habitable. This stone bothy is available for "occasional use" but not permanent occupation.
