= Gulf of Corryvreckan =

Narrow strait off the coast of Scotland

- Coire Bhreacain (Scottish Gaelic)
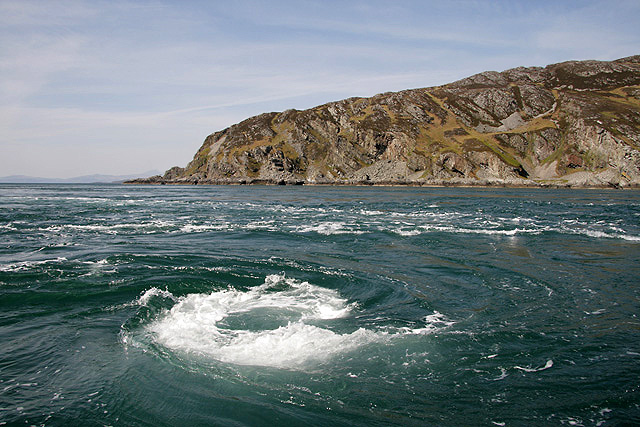
- Corryvreckan
- Interactive map of Gulf of Corryvreckan
- Location: Strait of Corryvreckan, between Jura and Scarba
- Coordinates: 56°09′18″N 05°43′40″W
- Type: Whirlpool

The Gulf of Corryvreckan, also called the Strait of Corryvreckan, is a narrow strait off the west coast of mainland Scotland. It is located between the islands of Jura and Scarba, in the council area of Argyll and Bute. Its name derives from the Gaelic Coire Bhreacain, meaning 'cauldron of the speckled seas' or 'cauldron of the plaid'.

The strait is known for its unusually intense tidal currents, which include the third largest whirlpool in the world. Tourists can visit the site by way of boat trips from local harbours or sightseeing flights from Oban Airport.

== Topography ==
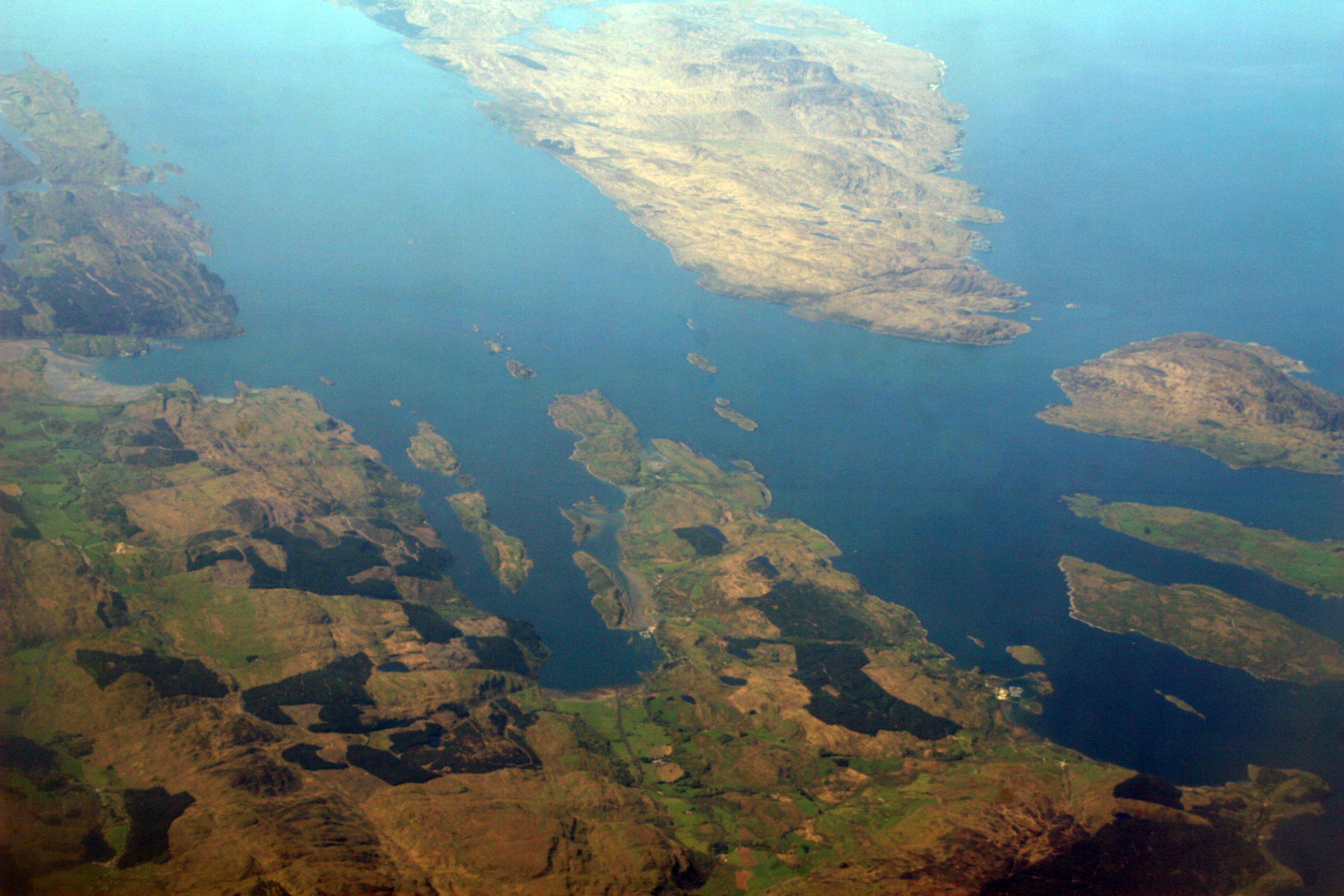
An aerial photograph, facing southwest, of the Gulf of Corryvreckan and its surroundings. The two islands to the top right are Jura (the larger one) and Scarba; the Gulf of Corryvreckan lies between them. Stretching off to the top left is the Sound of Jura.

Strong Atlantic currents and unusual underwater topography together produce a particularly intense tidal race in the Corryvreckan channel. As the flood tide enters the narrow area between the two islands it speeds up to 8.5 knots (16 km/h) and meets a variety of seabed features, including a deep hole and a rising pinnacle. These features combine to create whirlpools, standing waves and a variety of other surface effects.

The Corryvreckan is the third largest whirlpool in the world, and is on the northern side of the gulf, surrounding a pyramid-shaped basalt pinnacle that rises from depths of 70 to 29 m (230 to 95 ft) at its rounded top. Flood tides and outflow to the Firth of Lorne in the west can drive the waters of Corryvreckan to waves of more than 30 ft (9 m), and the roar of the resulting maelstrom can be heard 10 mi (16 km) away.

Although not, as is sometimes believed, formally classified by the Royal Navy as unnavigable, the nearby Grey Dogs, or Little Corryvreckan, are classified as such. The Admiralty's West Coast of Scotland Pilot guide to inshore waters calls it "very violent and dangerous" and says "no vessel should then attempt this passage without local knowledge". Experienced scuba divers who have explored the waters have described it as "potentially the most dangerous dive in Britain".

== Mythology ==
In Scottish mythology the hag goddess of winter, Cailleach Bheur, uses the gulf to wash her great plaid, and this ushers in the turn of the seasons from autumn to winter. As winter approaches, she uses the gulf as her washtub, and it is said the roar of the coming tempest can be heard from as far away as twenty miles (thirty kilometres), lasting for a period of three days. When she is finished with the washing, the cloth is pure white, and becomes the blanket of snow that covers the land. The Cailleach occupying the whirlpool was described as "the fiercest of the Highland storm kelpies" by Alasdair Alpin MacGregor.

Another legend surrounds Norse king Breacan. In various stories, Breacan moored his boat near the whirlpool to impress a local princess, or alternatively to flee from his father across the gulf. In both stories Breacan was swept into the whirlpool, and his body dragged ashore later by his dog. Breacan may be named after the whirlpool, or its current name may be a Gaelic pun on his name.

Charles Mackay's poem "The Kelpie of Corrievreckan" tells the story of a young woman who leaves her lover for a sea kelpie. She discovers too late that the kelpie lives at the bottom of the sea and she is drowned, "an awful warning to all fickle maidens". The words were adapted and set to music for piano and orchestra by Learmont Drysdale in the 1890s, and in 1939 Ruth Gipps set the poem to music for clarinet and piano.

The poet John Leyden, was an enthusiastic collector of old folklore. He compiled a poem, "The mermaid", based on a gaelic traditional ballad called Macphail of Colonsay and the Mermaid of Corrivrekin. The story states that this MacPhail was carried off by a mermaid and they lived together in a grotto beneath the sea where they had five children, but eventually he tired of her and escaped to land.

== History ==
Writing in the 7th century Adamnan called Corryvreckan "Charybdis Brecani". In Adomnan of Iona's Life of St Columba, the saint supposedly has miraculous knowledge of a particular bishop who ran into the "whirlpool of Corryvreckan". However, Adomnan says that this whirlpool was near Rathlin Island, suggesting perhaps either his geography was mistaken (although several other Irish sources of that time period agreed with Adomnan) or alternatively that originally a different place was known as the whirlpool of Corryvreckan and later ages gave this name to the current Corryvreckan, perhaps believing it was the one that Adomnan and others had written about in the 8th century.

Adomnan wrote:

[15] Of the peril of the holy bishop Cólman moccu Sailni in the sea near Rathlin island: Likewise, another day, while St Columba was in his mother church, he suddenly smiled and called out: "Cólman mac Beognai has set sail to come here, and is now in great danger in the surging tides of the whirlpool of Corryvreckan. Sitting in the prow, he lifts up his hands to heaven and blesses the turbulent, terrible seas. Yet the Lord terrifies him in this way, not so that the ship in which he sits should be overwhelmed and wrecked by the waves, but rather to rouse him to pray more fervently that he may sail through the peril and reach us here."

In 1549, Dean Monro wrote of "Skarbay" that between it and "Duray": "ther runnes ane streame, above the power of all sailing and rowing, with infinit dangers, callit Corybrekan. This stream is aught myle lang, quhilk may not be hantit bot be certain tyds."

In 1820, the world's first passenger paddleship, the PS Comet, was wrecked at nearby Craignish Point due to the strong currents in the area.

In the late 1940s, writer George Orwell and his three-year-old son (who lived at Barnhill in northern Jura) were briefly shipwrecked on the skerry of Eilean Mòr (south of the whirlpool) when boating in the gulf. Orwell's one-legged brother-in-law, Bill Dunn, was the first person to swim the gulf.

== Natural history ==
Minke whales and porpoises swim in the fast-moving waters and only the most resilient plants and corals thrive on the seabed. Soft corals such as Alcyonium digitatum can be found in hollows and other sheltered locations. The central pinnacle supports dense mats of the hydroids Tubularia indivisa and Sertularia cupressina and the bryozoan Securiflustra securifrons. The most exposed areas are covered by the barnacles Balanus crenatus and B. hameri.

The area is currently being considered for Special Area of Conservation status.

== Modern cultural references ==
Part of Powell's and Pressburger's 1945 film I Know Where I'm Going! was set at Corryvreckan. They filmed in Corryvreckan and the nearby (but less fierce) waters at Bealach a' Choin Ghlais ('the pass of the grey dog'). The footage obtained there was then used in back projections with the actors in a replica boat rocked on gimbals while buckets of water were thrown at them. Model shots of the whirlpool were made to give a medium view of the boat being drawn into Corryvreckan.

In mid-August 1947, the author George Orwell nearly drowned in the Corryvreckan whirlpool. Seeking to focus his main energies on completing a novel destined to become the dystopian classic Nineteen Eighty-Four, Orwell had fled the distractions of London in April 1947 and taken up temporary residence on the island of Jura in the Inner Hebrides. On the return leg of an August boating day trip to nearby Glengarrisdale, Orwell seems to have misread the local tide tables and steered into rough seas that drove his boat near to the whirlpool.

When the boat's small engine suddenly sheared off from its mounts and dropped into the sea, Orwell's party resorted to oars and was saved from drowning only when the whirlpool began to recede, and the group managed to paddle the distressed craft to a rocky outcrop about a mile (2 km) distant from the Jura coastline. The boat capsized as the group tried to disembark, leaving Orwell, his two companions, and his three-year-old son stranded on the uninhabited outcrop with no supplies or means of escape. They were rescued only when passing lobstermen noticed a fire the party had lit in an effort to keep warm. Orwell completed a first draft of Nineteen Eighty-Four about three months after the Corryvreckan incident, with the final manuscript not finished until late 1948.

The McCalmans have recorded a song called "Corryvreckan Calling".

The Ardbeg distillery on the island of Islay produces a cask-strength whisky named Corryvreckan. There is also a pub named after the gulf, located near to the harbour in Oban.

Waterlog, a book by Roger Deakin, prominently features the Corryvreckan whirlpool as a driving force behind the book's premise—a wild swimming and bathing journey through Britain.

The Scottish death metal band Hand of Kalliach produced an album Corryvreckan in 2024.

The Kaleidoscope Chamber Collective featured the piece The Corryvreckan Whirlpool on their 2023 album, Many Voices: Ensemble, composed by Aileen Sweeney. Anne Templer called it "a delightful folk tune".

== See also ==
- Saltstraumen – Norwegian sea strait with one of the strongest tidal currents in the world
- Moskstraumen – Tidal whirlpool system at the Lofoten archipelago in Norway
