= Scarba =

Island in Argyll and Bute, Scotland

Sgarba (Gaelic)
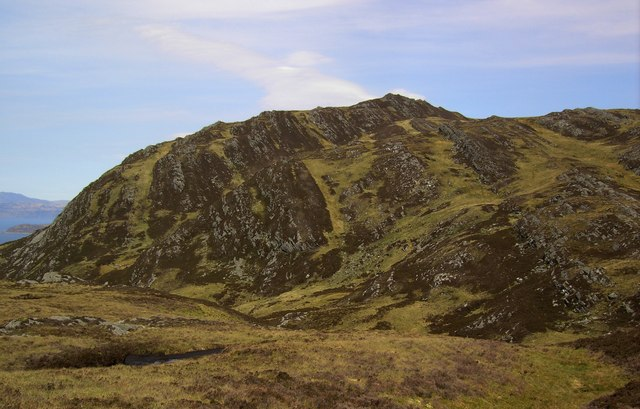
- Cruach Scarba

Location
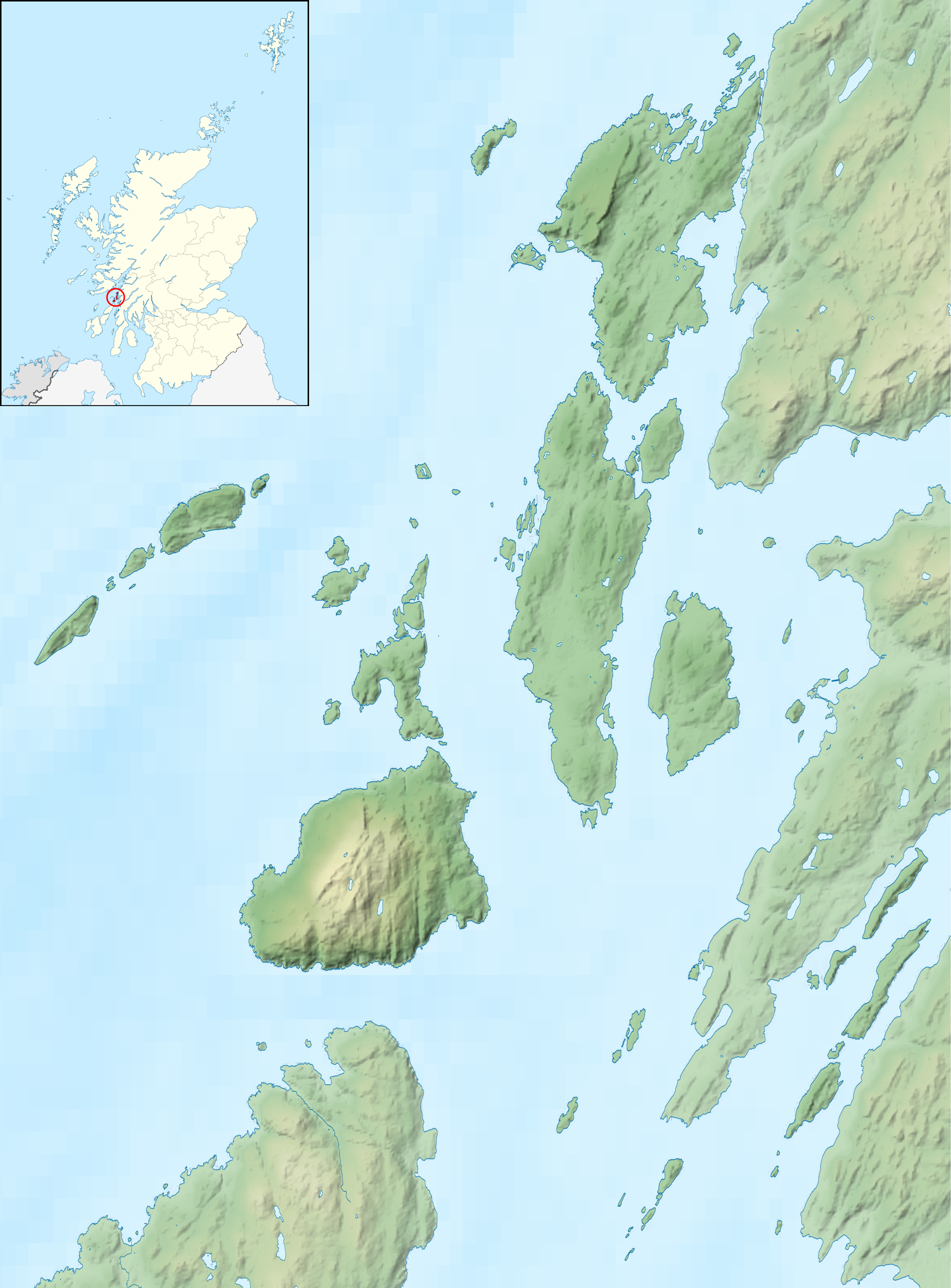
- Scarba shown next to the Slate Islands, Garvellachs, and the isles of Loch Craignish Scarba shown within Argyll and Bute
- OS grid reference: NM690044
- Coordinates: 56.177°N 5.72°W

Name
- Gaelic pronunciation: [ˈs̪kaɾapə]
- Name meaning: Old Norse for "sharp, stony, hilly terrain"
- Old Norse name: Skarpoe

Physical geography
- Island group: Islay
- Area: 1,474 ha (5 3/4 sq mi)
- Area rank: 39
- Highest elevation: Cruach Scarba 449 m (1,473 ft)

Administration
- Council area: Argyll and Bute
- Country: Scotland
- Sovereign state: United Kingdom

Demographics
- Population: Not permanently inhabited since the 1960s
- Largest settlement: Kilmory Lodge

Scarba (Scottish Gaelic: Sgarba) is an island, in Argyll and Bute, Scotland, just north of the much larger island of Jura. The island has not been permanently inhabited since the 1960s.

Until his death in 2013 it was owned by Richard Hill, 7th Baron Sandys; its owner now is Shane Cadzow who farms Luing cattle on the nearby island of Luing and grazes some of the cattle on Scarba. Kilmory Lodge is available for rental as holiday accommodation, and is used seasonally as a shooting lodge, the island having a flourishing herd of red deer.

The island's name is from the Norse and may mean "sharp, stony, hilly terrain" or "cormorant island".

== Description ==
Cruach Scarba
- (Scottish Gaelic: 'Cruach Sgarba')

Highest point
- Elevation: 449 m (1,473 ft)
- Prominence: 449 m (1,473 ft)
- Listing: Marilyn

Naming
- English translation: Hill of Scarba
- Language of name: Gaelic
- Pronunciation: ˈkʰɾuəx ˈs̪kaɾapə

Geography
- Location: Inner Hebrides, Scotland
- OS grid: NM690044
- Topo map: OS Landranger 55

Scarba is not served by any public ferries, but access from Craobh Haven or Crinan Harbour is possible by arrangement with local boatmen. The rough summit ridge can be accessed from the harbour at the north end, from where a vehicle track leads up past Kilmory Lodge to a height of about 200 metres. After that, there are no paths or well defined routes, and the terrain becomes rough and boggy. The island rises steeply to a peak (Cruach Scarba) of 449 metres (1,473 ft). A cylindrical triangulation point marks the highest of several summits, which are surrounded by several small lochs.

== Geology ==
The western two-thirds of Scarba is formed from the Neoproterozoic aged coarse-grained quartzites of the Jura Quartzite Formation ascribed to the Islay Subgroup of the Dalradian Argyll Group. Separated from these rocks by a north–south aligned geological fault, the bedrock of the eastern third is the Neoproterozoic Scarba Conglomerate Formation, and the subordinate Jura Slate Member belonging to the Easdale Subgroup of the Argyll Group. North-south aligned dykes of amphibolite are found throughout the Jura Quartzite whilst lamprophyre dykes of Siluro-Devonian age and basalt and micro-gabbro dykes forming part of the Palaeogene age ‘Mull Dyke Swarm’ cut through both the Quartzite in the west and the Conglomerate in the east.

Raised marine deposits of sand and gravel occur on the northeast coast, a legacy of late Quaternary changes in relative sea-level. Peat deposits are common within the island's interior.

== Corryvreckan ==
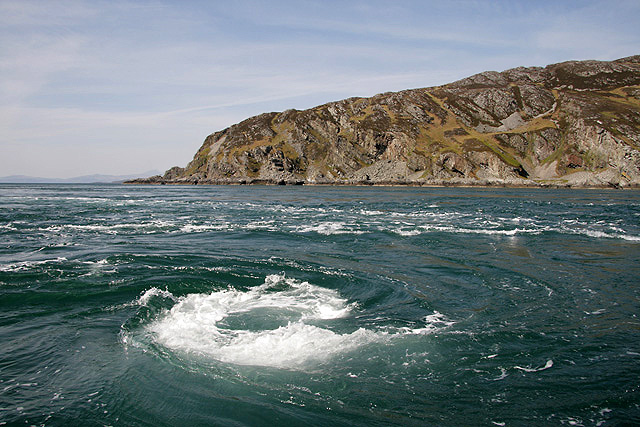
The whirlpool, with Scarba in the background

Between Scarba and Jura lies the Gulf of Corryvreckan, known for its whirlpool. Writing in 1549, Dean Monro wrote of "Skarbay" that between it and "Duray":

Ther runnes ane streame, above the power of all sailing and rowing, with infinite dangers, callit Corybrekan. This stream is aught myle lang, quhilk may not be hantit bot be certain tyds. This Skarbay is four myles lange from the west to the eist, and an myle breadth, ane high rough yle, inhabit and manurit, with some woods in it.

Scarba and a few nearby islets (Lunga and the Garvellachs) are collectively the Scarba, Lunga and the Garvellachs National Scenic Area, one of 40 such areas in Scotland, which are defined so as to identify areas of exceptional scenery and to ensure its protection by restricting certain forms of development.

== Gallery ==
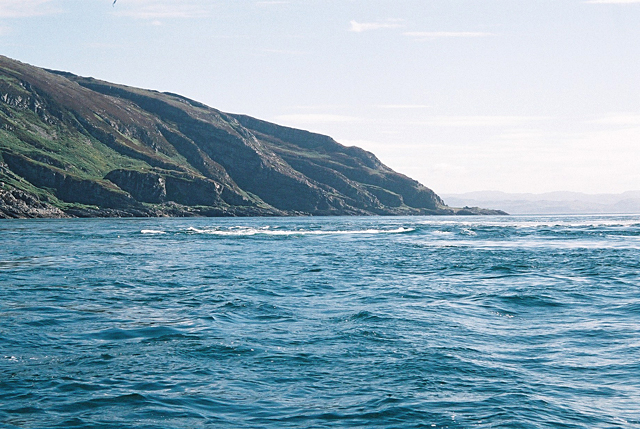
The Corryvreckan whirlpool

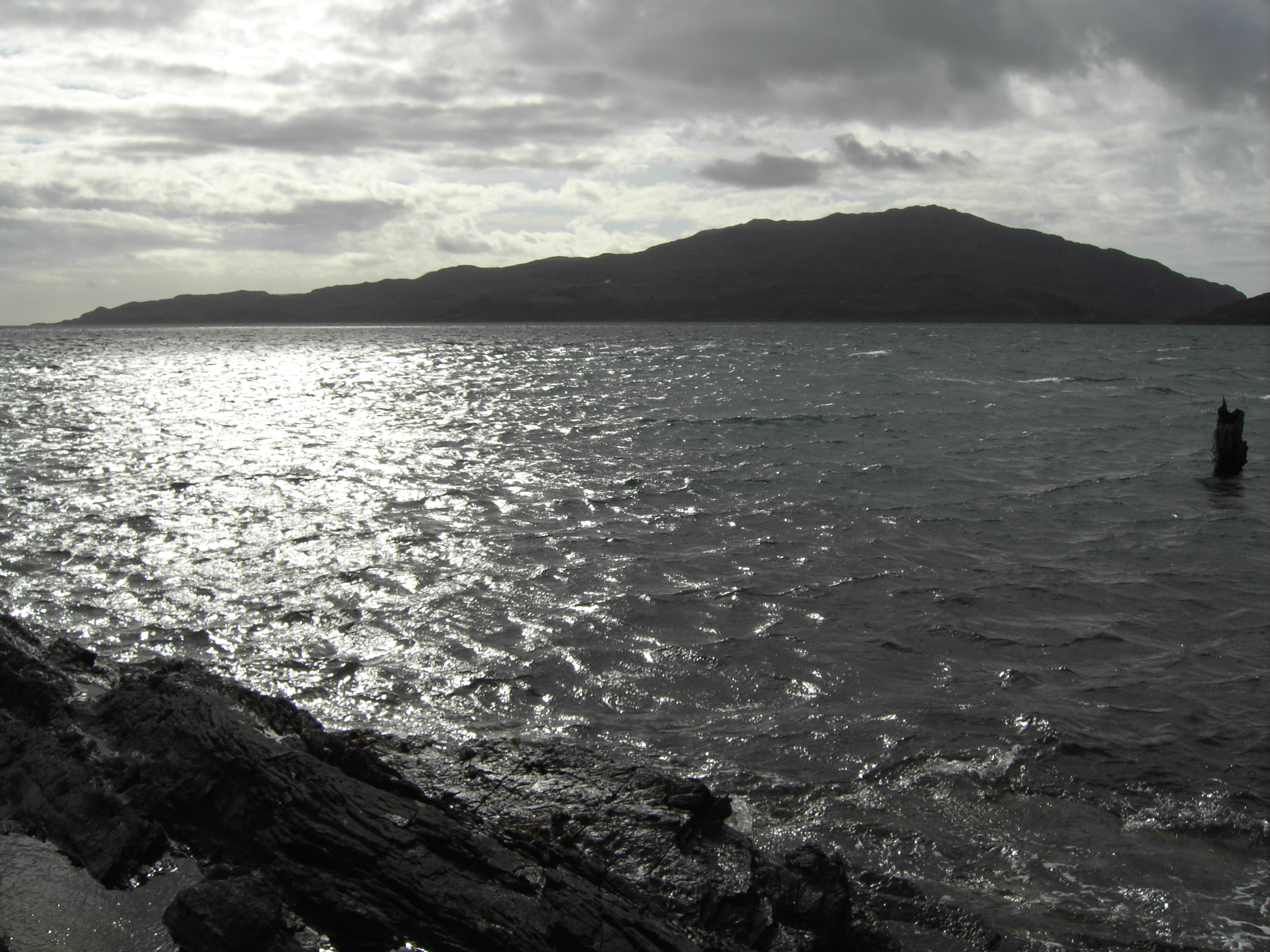
The view from Luing looking towards Scarba

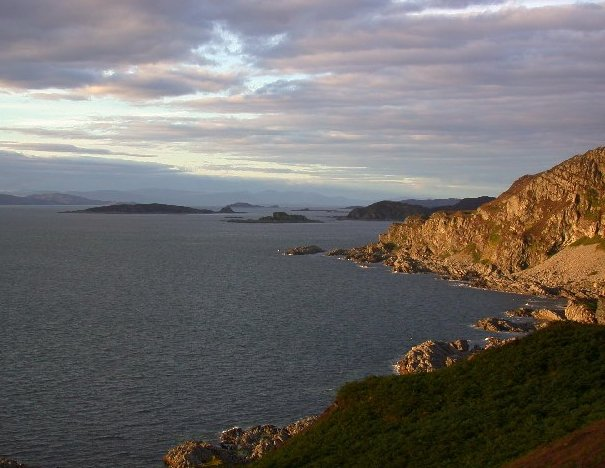
Na h-Urrachann, Isle of Scarba, looking north towards the Slate Islands

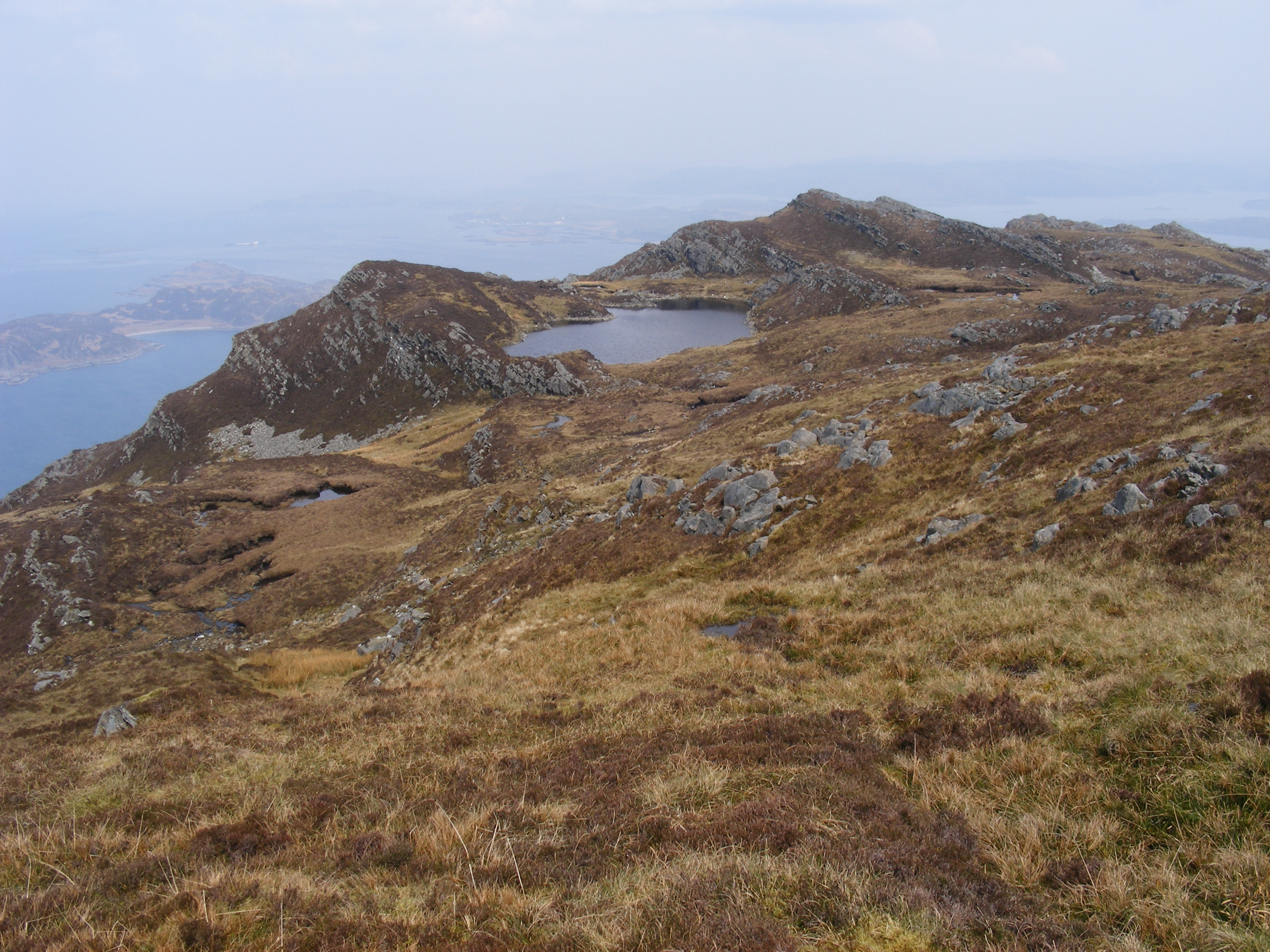
A view northwards along the summit ridge from a short distance north of the highest point
