= Firth of Lorn =

Inlet in Western Scotland

Firth of Lorne
- Location in Scotland
- Location: Scotland, United Kingdom
- Coordinates: 56°20′N 5°45′W

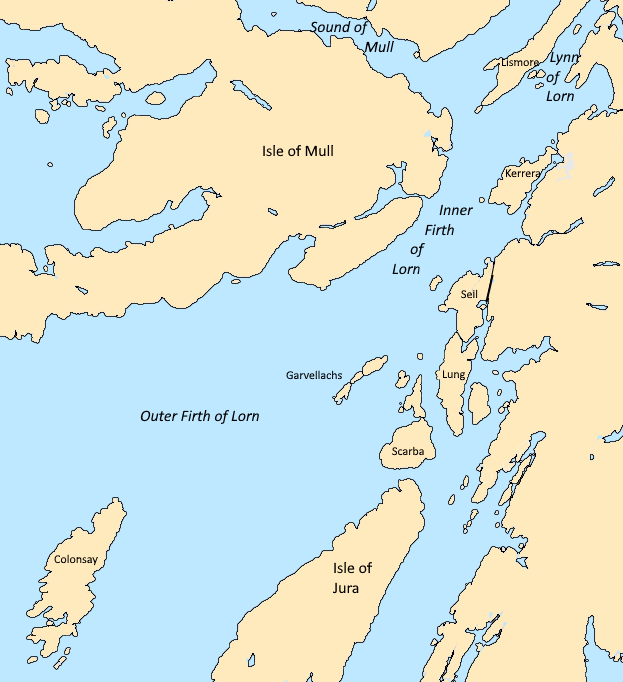
Firth of Lorn

The Firth of Lorn or Lorne (Scottish Gaelic: An Linne Latharnach) is the inlet of the sea between the south-east coast of the Isle of Mull and the mainland of Scotland. It includes a number of islands, and is noted for the variety of wildlife habitats that are found. In 2005, a large part of the Firth became a Special Area of Conservation.

== Geography and geology ==
The firth extends from the junction of the Sound of Mull and the Lynn of Lorn in the north-east, in a south-westerly direction towards Colonsay. The narrower north-eastern part is the Inner Firth, and the wider south-western part is the Outer Firth. The firth takes its name from the historic province of Lorne on the adjacent mainland.

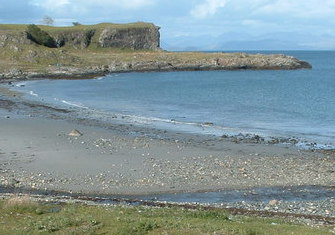
Rock platform and raised cliff at Port Donain, Isle of Mull

The Firth of Lorn is a continuation of the Great Glen - the Great Glen Fault runs along the north-western side of the firth. A conspicuous feature of the coasts of the firth is the presence of rock platforms and raised cliffs. These can be seen on the coast of Mull, on the Island of Kerrera and on the mainland. They are believed to be the result of marine erosion at a time when sea levels were higher than at present, probably during a late interglacial period. The nature of the seabed in the firth has been studied by several methods, including echo-sounding, sampling with grabs, and surveys using submersible vessels. The bedrock is mainly precambrian of the Dalradian Supergroup overlain uncomformably by rocks of the Old Red Sandstone. A notable feature is the Insh fault which forms a submarine cliff up to 150m high, passing to the west of Insh Island.

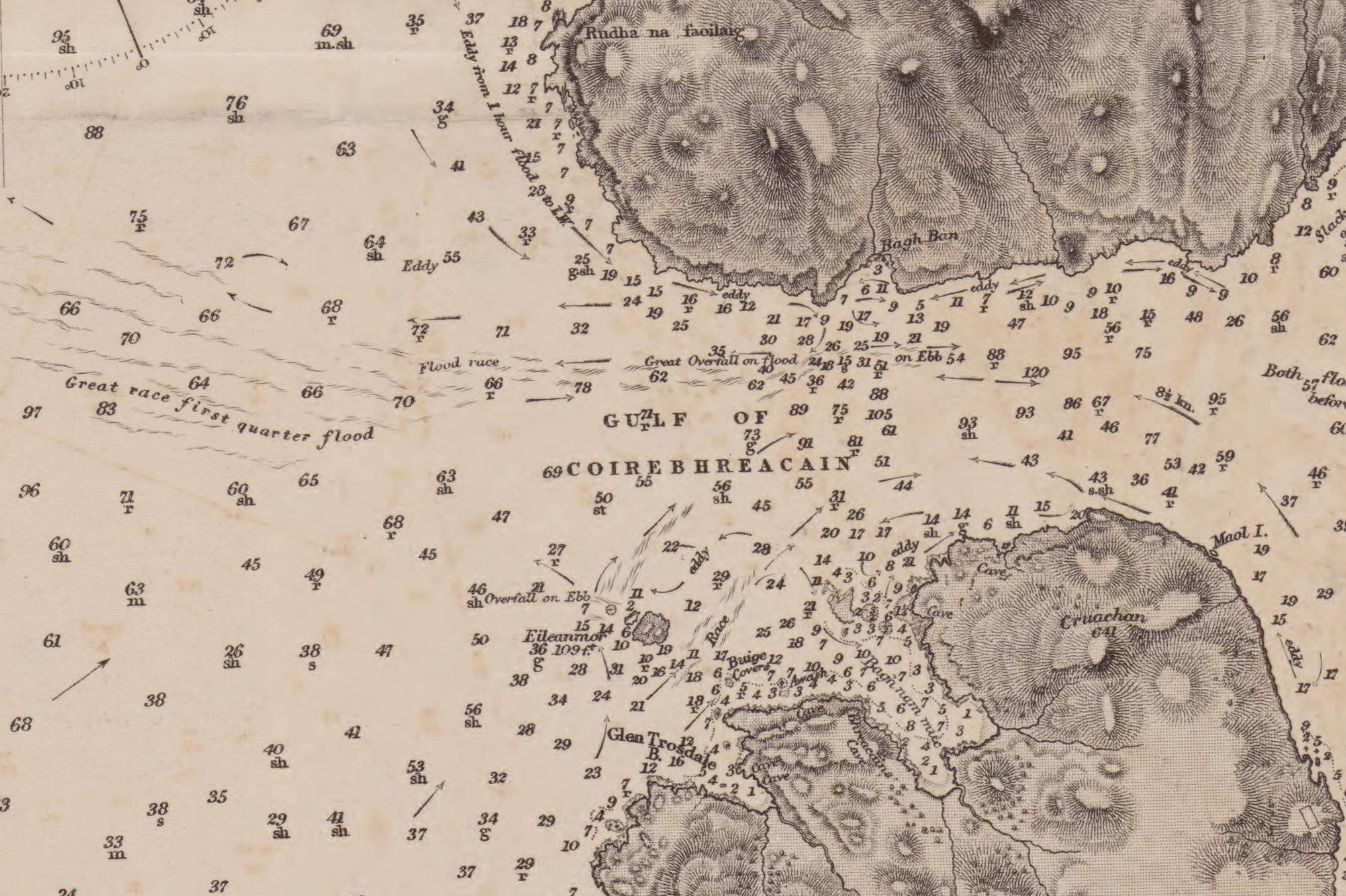
The Great Race, where the flood tide emerges from between Jura (S) and Scarba (N) into the main part of the Firth of Lorn

The Firth of Lorn is noted for its strong tidal currents, particularly in the channels between the islands. In the Gulf of Corryvreckan, between Jura and Scarba, tidal flows can reach 8.5 knots, and form a famous whirlpool. When the west-going flood tide emerges into the main part of the firth it can form overfalls, dangerous breaking steep seas, particularly if it meets a swell from the west or south-west. This is known as the "Great Race". Bealach a'Choin Ghlais (the channel of the "Grey Dogs"), between Scarba and Lunga being narrower, is if anything more hazardous.

== Habitats and conservation ==
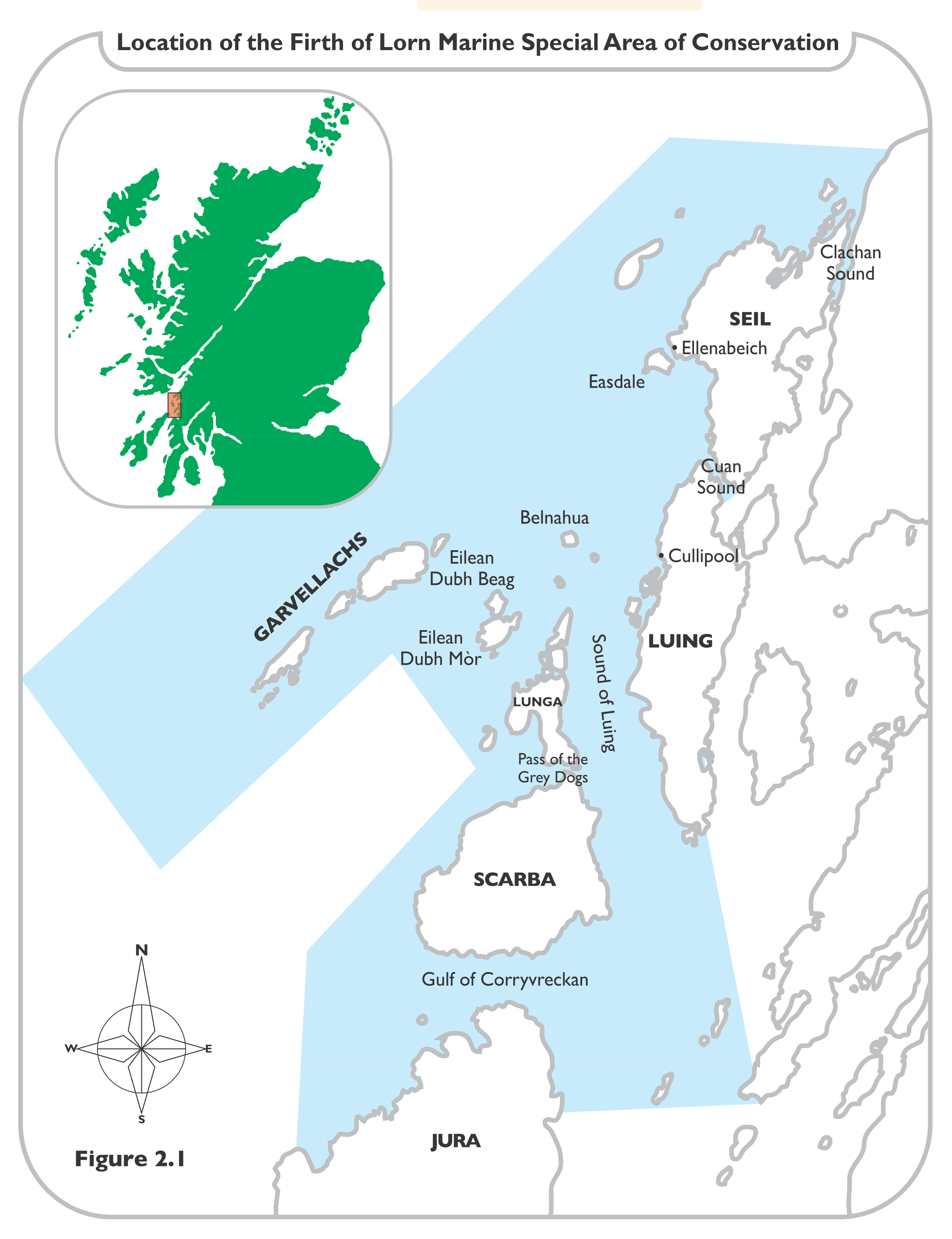
Firth of Lorn Special Area of Conservation Map

The tidal currents in the firth are not only of concern to navigators, but have a major effect on wildlife. The varied conditions, with some areas exposed to strong currents and others sheltered, and the range of depths found in the firth contributes to the great diversity of its habitats. Another contributor to diversity is that the firth is an area of overlap – some species are close to their northern limits, others are close to their southern limits. This has led to it being an area of great scientific interest, and to the establishment of the Special Area of Conservation (SAC) in 2005. The SAC is focussed on the rocky reef habitats. Species of particular interest are the sea fan Swiftia pallida and its associated anemone Amphianthus dohrnii The whole of the Firth of Lorn became a Marine Protected Area in 2014.

== Economic activities ==
Fishing in the Firth of Lorn is mainly inshore, harvesting shellfish and crustaceans. Mobile fishing includes trawling and dredging for prawns and scallops. Static fishing includes setting creels, pots or nets for prawns, lobsters, crawfish and crabs. There is also commercial diving for shellfish. There is one salmon farm within the SAC, on the east coast of Lunga. Dredging is of particular environmental concern on account of its potential to damage non-target species. One study carried out within the Firth of Lorn SAC has documented this impact.

Marine tourism is important to the area, and includes scuba diving, sea angling, wildlife watching, sailing, and commercial boat tours. Cruise ships are increasingly to be seen in the area. Large cargo ships and oil tankers use the route through the Sound of Mull and the Firth of Lorn. There are numerous ferry routes in the firth. The firth is the main south-western approach to the Caledonian Canal.

Historically, an important activity was slate quarrying on the islands on the south-east side of the firth. This led to the islands being known as the Slate Islands. At its peak in the 19th-century slate was exported all over the world. Most production ceased in 1914, and the last quarry closed in 1960.

== In popular culture ==
The Firth of Lorne featured as the location for the boat chase near the end of the second James Bond film From Russia with Love, released in 1963.

Cuan Sound and the islands of Easdale and Seil all feature in the Florence and the Machine video, Queen of Peace/Long and Lost.
