= List of Inner Hebrides =

Islands near Scotland

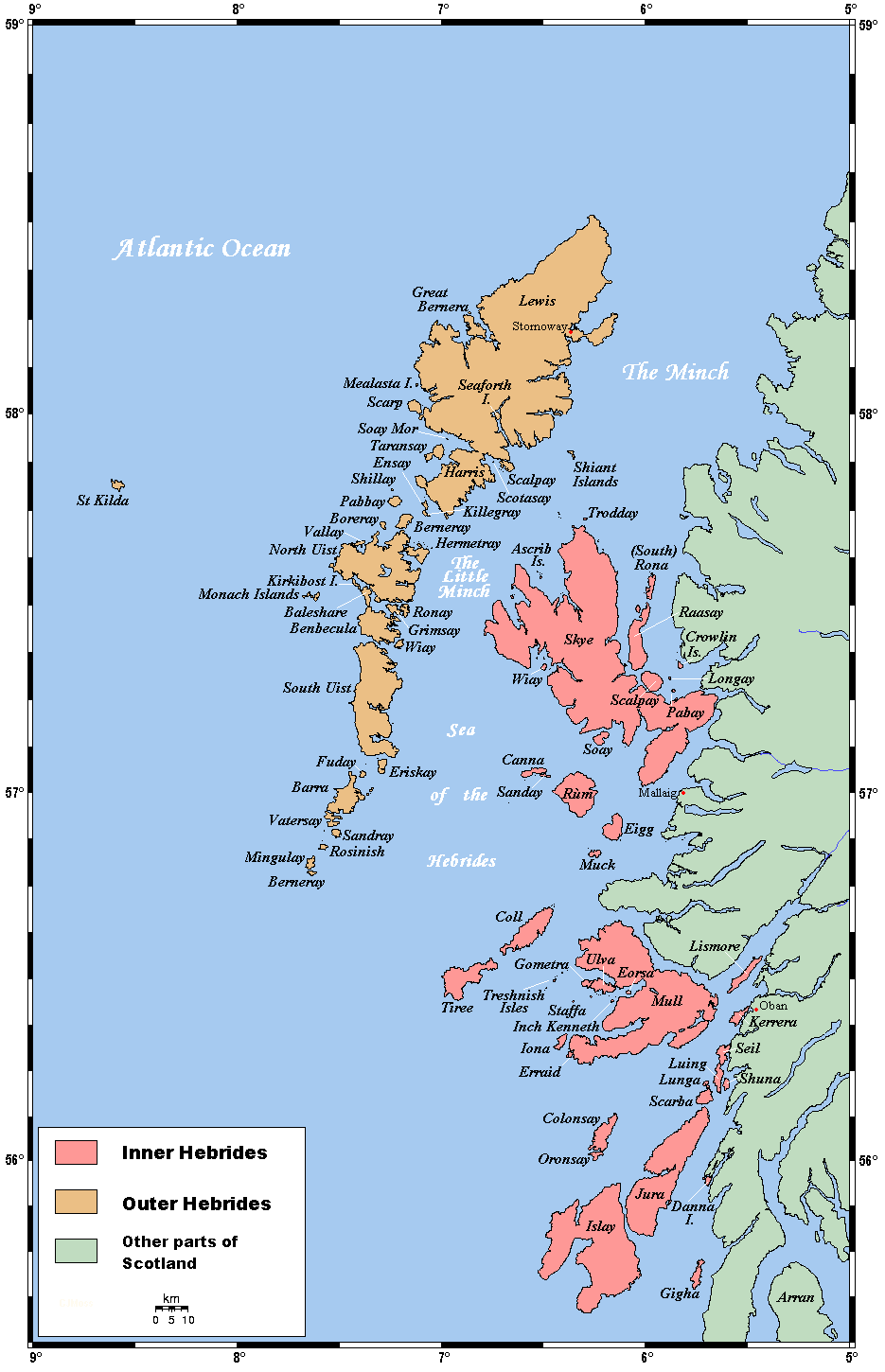
The Hebrides. The Outer Hebrides lie to the west, with the Inner Hebrides (in red) closer to the mainland of Scotland in the east.

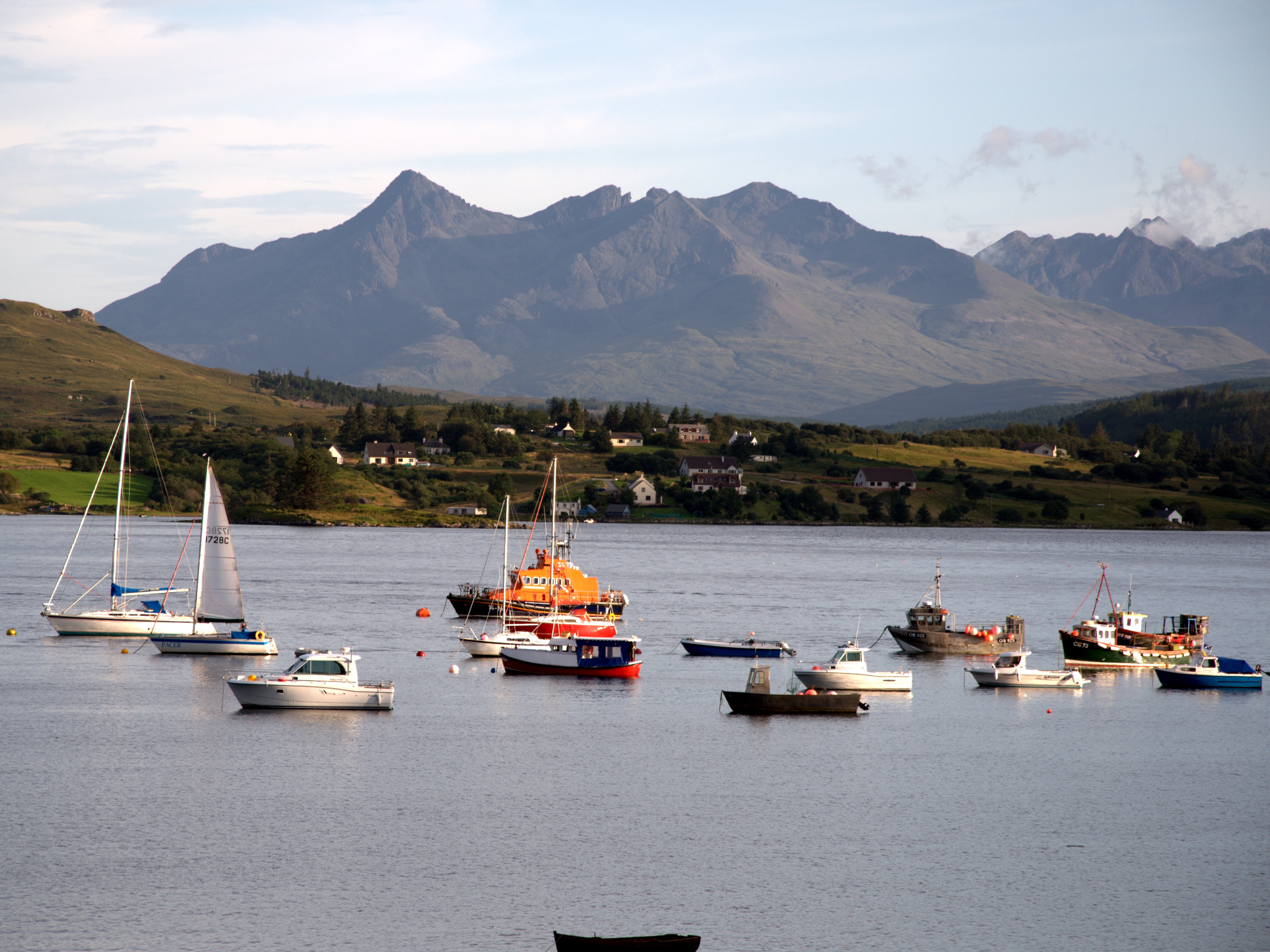
The Cuillin ridge from Portree harbour, Skye

The Inner Hebrides are a chain of islands and skerries located off the west coast of mainland Scotland. There are over 30 inhabited islands in this archipelago, of which Islay, Mull and Skye are the largest and most populous.

The islands of Scotland's west coast are known collectively as the Hebrides; the Inner Hebrides are separated from the Outer Hebrides by The Minch to the north and the Sea of the Hebrides to the south. The Inner Hebrides that lie respectively north and south of Ardnamurchan are administered by two separate local authorities as part of larger territories. The northern Inner Hebrides, including Skye, the Small Isles and the Summer Isles, are part of the Highland unitary council region. The southern group, including Islay, Jura, the Slate Islands and Gigha are part of the Argyll and Bute council region.

In the past, the Hebrides as a whole were a strong Scottish Gaelic-speaking area, and in 1921 more than 50% of the populations of most of these islands, including Skye, Mull and Islay, were proficient in the language. However, although the Outer Hebrides have retained many Gaelic speakers, in the 2001 census only Skye (31%) and Tiree (48%) had more than 25% of the resident population able to speak Gaelic; Mull, Jura, Gigha and Coll each recorded figures of less than 15%.

The modern economy centres on tourism, crofting, farming, fishing, and whisky distilling. The archipelago is exposed to wind and tide. There are numerous lighthouses as an aid to navigation.

There are various descriptions of the scope of the Hebrides. The Collins Encyclopedia of Scotland describes the Inner Hebrides as lying "east of The Minch", which would include any and all offshore islands. There are various islands that lie in the sea lochs, such as Eilean Bàn and Eilean Donan, that might not ordinarily be described as "Hebridean", but no formal definition exists and for simplicity they are included in this list rather than elsewhere. (Note: The definition of an island used in this list is that it is "land that is surrounded by seawater on a daily basis, but not necessarily at all stages of the tide, excluding human devices such as bridges and causeways". Other definitions are used in the Scottish context. For example, the General Register Office for Scotland define an island as "a mass of land surrounded by water, separate from the Scottish mainland" but although they include islands linked by bridges etc. this is not clear from this definition. Haswell-Smith (2004) uses "an Island is a piece of land or group of pieces of land which is entirely surrounded by water at Lowest Astronomical Tide and to which there is no permanent means of dry access". This is widely agreed to be unhelpful as it intentionally excludes bridged islands.)

== Etymology ==
Various Gaelic names are used repeatedly. The suffix ay or aigh or aidh is generally from the Norse øy meaning "island". Eilean (plural: eileanan) also means "island". Beag and mòr (also bheag and mhòr) mean "little" and "big" and are often found together. Sgeir is "skerry" and often refers to a rock or rocks that lie submerged at high tide. Dubh is "black", dearg is "red" and glas means "grey" or "green". Orasaigh is from the Norse Örfirirsey meaning "tidal" or "ebb island".

== Inhabited islands ==
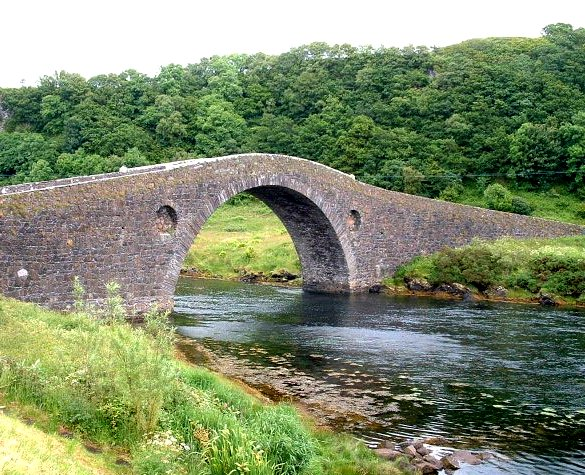
The Clachan Bridge, Seil, also known as the "Bridge Over the Atlantic"

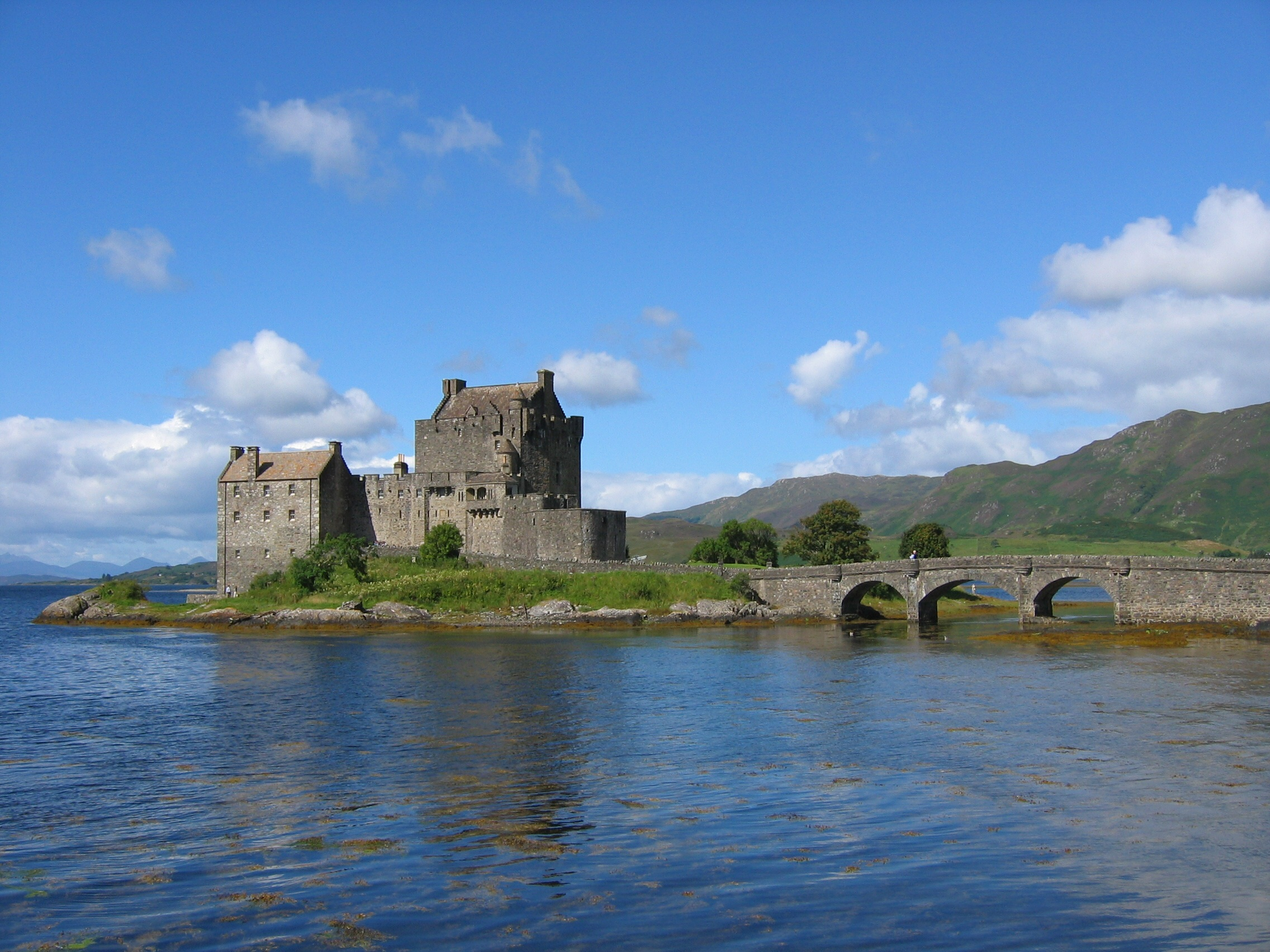
Eilean Donan castle

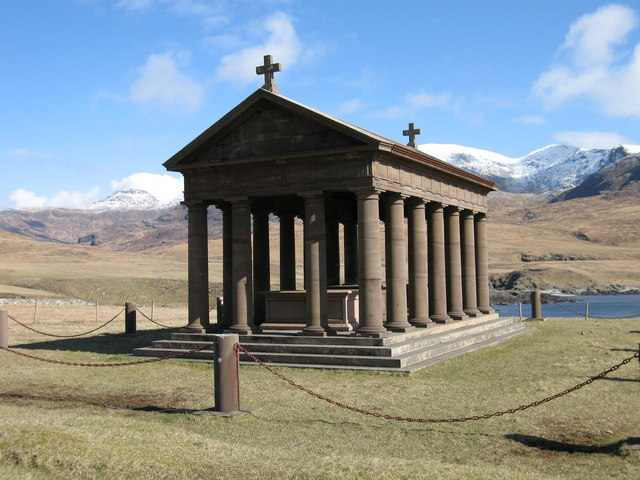
The Bullough mausoleum with the Rùm Cullin in the distance

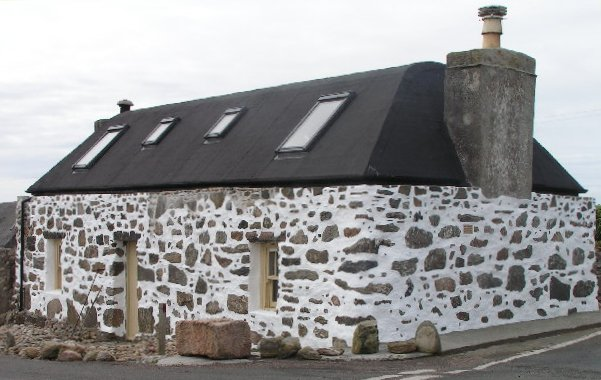
A restored traditional house on Tiree

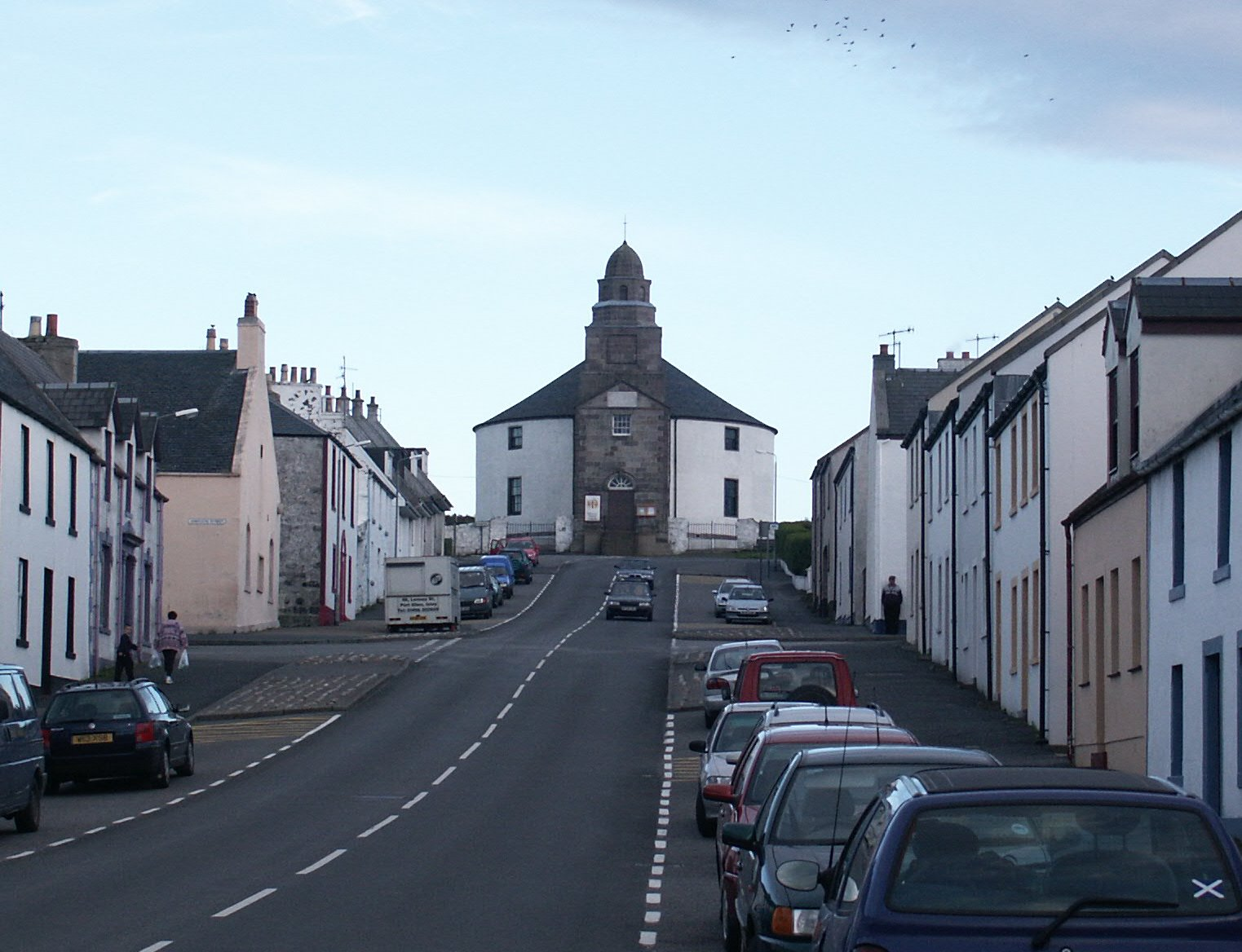
Bowmore, Islay with its distinctive round church

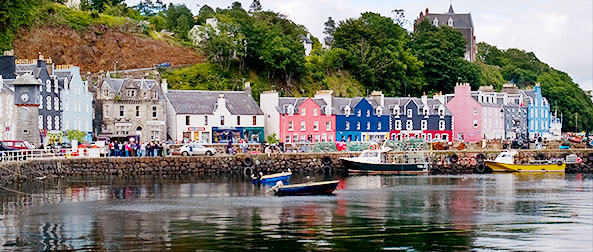
Tobermory harbour, Mull

The inhabited islands of the Inner Hebrides had a population of 18,257 in 2001, and 18,948 at the time of the 2011 census. By the time of the 2022 census the population had increased by 1.4% to 19,211. The highest peaks of the islands have names deriving from both Gaelic and Old Norse, indicating the historical importance of these two cultures.

In the Outer Hebrides all of the inhabited islands are now connected to at least one other island by a land transport route, but only four Inner Hebridean islands are connected by road, all to the mainland. The Clachan Bridge from Argyll to Seil was designed by Thomas Telford and dates from 1792. Skye has been connected to Kyle of Lochalsh by the Skye Bridge since 1995. Danna is also connected to the Tayvallich peninsula in Argyll by a stone causeway.

Inhabited islands
Island	Gaelic name	Group (Note: Geographically, the inhabited islands can easily be separated into those that are or surround Islay, Gigha, Mull, and Skye or are in the Small Isles, Slate Islands, Firth of Lorn, Crowlin Islands, Summer Isles, one of the major sea lochs or the North Highland group.)	Area (ha)	Population (Note: The RESAS 2022 data is provided for individual islands but not archipelagoes. The National Records of Scotland data for the same period is provided for 'Island Groups' but not individual islands. There are discrepancies between the two sets and in the case of the Inner Hebrides the aggregated island totals exceed that of the Island Group.)	Highest point	Height (m)
Canna	Canaigh	Small Isles	1,130	9	Càrn a' Ghaill	210
Coll	Cola	Mull	7,685	176	Ben Hogh	104
Colonsay	Colbhasa	Islay	4,074	117	Carnan Eoin	104
Danna	Danna	Islay	315	5	Cruiadh Bharr	54
Easdale	Eilean Èisdeal	Slate Islands	20	61	–	38
Eigg	Eige	Small Isles	3,049	95	An Sgurr	393
Eilean Buidhe	Eilean Buidhe	Craobh Haven	4	6		9
Eilean dà Mhèinn	Eilean dà Mhèinn	Knapdale	4	1	–	16
Eilean Loain	Eilean Loain	Loch Sween	15	2	–	28
Eilean Shona	Eilean Seona	Loch Moidart	525	9	Beinn a' Bhàillidh	265
Eilean Tioram	Eilean Tioram	North Highland	5	6	–	10
Eriska	Aoraisge	Loch Linnhe	310	21 (Note: Although obviously inhabited at the time (there is a hotel on the island) the General Registers Office did not provide a population total for this tidal island in either the 2001 or 2011 censuses.)	Ceann Garbh	47
Erraid	Eilean Earraid	Mull	187	6	Cnoc Mòr	75
Gigha	Giogha	Islay	1,395	187	Creag Bhàn	100
Gometra	Gòmastra	Mull	425	7	–	155
Isle of Ewe	Eilean Iùbh	North Highland	309	7	Creag Streap	72
Iona	Ì Chaluim Chille	Mull	877	178	Dùn Ì	101
Islay	Ìle	Islay	61,956	3,180	Beinn Bheigeir	491
Jura	Diùra	Islay	36,692	258	Beinn an Òir	785
Kerrera	Cearrara	Firth of Lorn	1,214	61	Carn Breugach	189
Lismore	Lios Mòr	Firth of Lorn	2,351	190	Barr Mòr	127
Luing	Luinn	Slate Islands	1,430	178	Binneinn Furachail	87
Lunga	Lunga	Slate Islands	254	2	Bidean na h-Iolaire	98
Muck	Eilean nam Muc	Small Isles	559	28	Beinn Airein	137
Mull	Muile	Mull	87,535	3,063	Ben More	966
Oronsay	Orasaigh	Islay	543	7	Beinn Orasaigh	93
Raasay	Ratharsair	Skye	6,231	187	Dùn Caan	444
Rona	Rònaigh	Skye	930	2	Meall Acairseidh	125
Rùm	Rùm	Small Isles	10,463	31	Askival	812
Sanday	Sandaigh	Small Isles	184	4	Tallabric	59
Seil	Saoil	Slate Islands	1,329	580	Meall Chaise	146
Shuna	Siuna	Slate Islands	451	2	Druim na Dubh Ghlaic	90
Skye	An t-Eilean Sgitheanach	Skye	165,625	10,496	Sgurr Alasdair	993
Soay	Sòdhaigh	Skye	1,036	3	Beinn Bhreac	141
Tiree	Tiriodh	Mull	7,834	700	Ben Hynish	141
Ulva	Ulbha	Mull	1,990	6	Beinn Chreagach	313

Eilean Bàn had a population of 2 and Eilean Donan a single resident in 2001 but none recorded a usually resident population in 2011 or 2022. Eilean Donan is dominated by its castle and has had a connection to the mainland perhaps from as early as the 13th century. The arched bridge in use today was constructed in the early 20th century. Scalpay and Tanera Mòr both had a population of 4 in 2011 but no permanent residents in 2022.

Castle Stalker, Eilean Horrisdale, Eilean Loain and Inch Kenneth were "included in the NRS statistical geography for inhabited islands but had no usual residents at the time of either the 2001 or 2011 censuses".

== Uninhabited islands ==
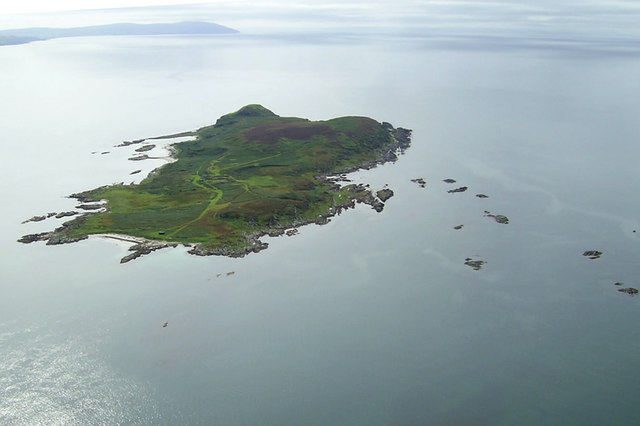
Cara from the air

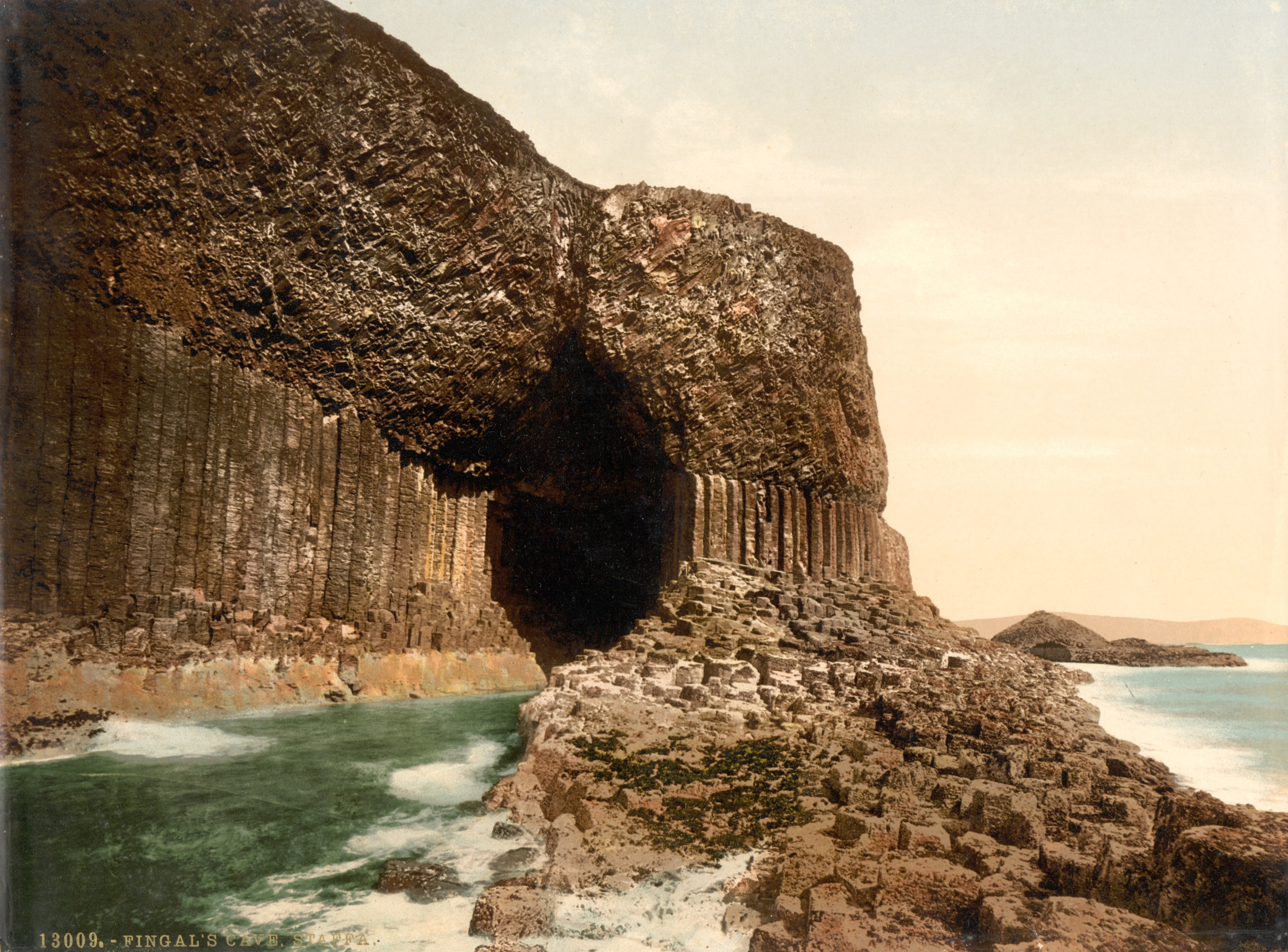
Fingal's Cave, Staffa

There are 43 uninhabited Inner Hebrides with an area greater than 30 hectares (approximately 74 acres). Records for the last date of settlement for the smaller uninhabited islands are incomplete, but most of the islands listed here would have been inhabited at some point during the Neolithic, Iron Age, Early Historic or Norse periods.

In common with the other main island chains of Scotland many of the more remote islands were abandoned during the 19th and 20th centuries, in some cases after continuous habitation since prehistoric times. These places had been perceived as relatively self-sufficient agricultural economies, but both island residents and outsiders later came to consider that the more remote islands lacked the essential services of a modern industrial economy.

Some of the islands continue to contribute to modern culture. Staffa came to prominence in the late 18th century after a visit by Sir Joseph Banks. He and his fellow travellers extolled the natural beauty of the basalt columns in general, and in particular of the island's main sea cavern, which Banks renamed "Fingal's Cave". Many other prominent personalities visited Staffa over the next two centuries, including Felix Mendelssohn, whose Hebrides Overture brought further fame to the island. During the Second World War, Gruinard was the site of a biological warfare test by British military scientists. At that time there was an investigation by the British government to test both the vulnerability of Britain to attack and the possibility of attacking Germany using anthrax.

The difficulties of definition are considerable in some cases. For example, Haswell-Smith (2004) treats Lunga (Note: Lunga is at grid reference NM707088.) as a single island, although during high tides it becomes one inhabited island and numerous uninhabited tidal islets. Another example is the smaller island of Eilean Mòr in Loch Dunvegan, which joins with nearby Eilean Dubh and Garay Island at low tides. (Note: Eilean Mòr is at grid reference NG224489.)

Uninhabited islands
Island	Gaelic name	Group	Area (ha)	Last inhabited (Note: Indicates the last known date of permanent, year round settlement)	Highest point	Height (m)
Calbha Beag	Calbha Beag	Eddrachillis Bay	31	Unknown	–	41
Calbha Mor	Calbha Mòr	Eddrachillis Bay	70	Unknown	–	67
Calve Island	Eilean Chailbhe	Mull	72	Unknown	–	20
Cara	Cara	Gigha	66	1940s	–	56
Càrna	Càrna	Loch Sunart	213	1980s	Cruachan Chàrna	169
Eileach an Naoimh	Eileach an Naoimh	Garvellachs	56	10th century	–	80
Eilean an Ròin Mòr	Eilean an Ròin Mòr	North Highland	33	Unknown	–	63
Eilean Bàn	An t-Eilean Bàn	Skye	2.4	2001	–	c. 6
Eilean Donan	Eilean Donnain	Loch Duich	1	2001	–	3
Eilean Dubh Mòr	An t-Eilean Dubh Mòr	Slate Islands	65	No census records	–	53
Eilean Fladday	Eilean Fhladaigh	Skye	137	1970s	–	39
Eilean Horrisdale	Eilean Thòireasdal	North Highland	32	20th century	Carn Garbh	38
Eilean Ighe	Eilean Ighe	Sound of Arisaig	35	Unknown	–	20
Eilean Macaskin	Eilean MhicAsgain	Loch Craignish	50	1880s	–	65
Eilean Meadhonach	An t-Eilean Meadhanach	Crowlin Islands	77	Unknown	–	54
Eilean Mhic Chrion	Eilean MhicChrìon	Loch Craignish	54	Unknown	–	63
Eilean Mòr	An t-Eilean Mòr	Crowlin Islands	170	circa 1920	Meall a' Chòis	114
Eilean Rìgh	Eilean Rìgh	Loch Craignish	86	1939	Dùn Righ	55
Eilean Tigh	Eilean an Taighe	Skye	58	Unknown	Meall Mòr	111
Eilean Trodday	Eilean Throdaigh	Skye	42	Unknown	–	45
Eorsa	Eòrsa	Mull	122	No census records	–	98
Garbh Eileach	Garbh Eileach	Garvellachs	142	Pre-modern (Note: There are no historical records of inhabitation although there are the ruins of an "ancient fort".)	–	110
Gruinard	Eilean Ghruinneart	North Highland	196	1920s	An Eilid	106
Gunna	Gunnaigh	Mull	69	Pre-modern (Note: There are the ruins of a "small cell", perhaps once used by an anchorite.)	–	35
Handa	Eilean Shannda	North Highland	309	1848	Sithean Mòr	123
Harlosh Island	Eilean Heàrrlois	Skye	34	Unknown	–	51
Horse Island	Eilean nan Each	Summer Isles	53	19th century	Sgurr nan Uan	60
Inch Kenneth	Innis Choinnich	Mull	55	1970s	–	49
Insh	An Innis	Slate Islands	36	Unknown	–	69
Isay	Ìosaigh	Skye	60	1860	–	28
Isle Martin	Eilean Mhàrtainn	Summer Isles	157	1948 (Note: The Census indicates a population of 3 in 1931 and nil in 1961. A mill was operated on the island until 1948 and abandonment is assumed when it closed and the associated buildings and wharves were dismantled.)	–	120
Isle Ristol	Eilean Ruisteil	Summer Isles	225	18th century?	–	71
Little Colonsay	Colbhasa Beag	Mull	88	1940s	–	61
Longa Island	Longa	North Highland	126	late 19th century	Druim am Eilean	70
Longay	Longaigh	Skye	50	16th century	–	67
Lunga	Lungaigh	Mull	81	1857	Cruachan	103
Oldany Island	Eilean Alltanaidh	Eddrachillis Bay	200	Unknown	Sidhean nan Ealachan	104
Ornsay	Eilean Iarmain	Skye	c. 35	Unknown	–	46
Oronsay	Orasaigh	Loch Sunart	230	Unknown	Druim Mòr	58
Pabay	Pabaigh	Skye	122	1980s	–	28
Priest Island	Eilean a' Chlèirich	Summer Isles	122	No census records	–	78
Scalpay	Sgalpaigh	Skye	2,483	2011	Mullach na Càrn	396
Scarba	Sgarba	Islay	1,474	1960s	Cruach Scarba	449
Shuna	Siuna	Mull	155	1960s	Tom an t-Seallaidh	71
Staffa	Stafa	Mull	33	18th century	–	42
Tanera Beag	Tannara Beag	Summer Isles	66	No census records	–	83
Tanera Mòr	Tannara Mòr	Summer Isles	310	2011	Meall Mòr	124
Texa	Teacsa (Note: The Gaelic etymology is disputed. It may have been called Oideach by Adomnan and was referred to as "Ilantasson" (i.e. "island Tasson") in 1624.)	Islay	48	Early 19th century	Ceann Garbh	48
Torsa	Torsa	Slate Islands	113	1960s	–	62
Wiay	Fuidheigh	Skye	148	19th century	–	60

== Smaller islets and skerries ==
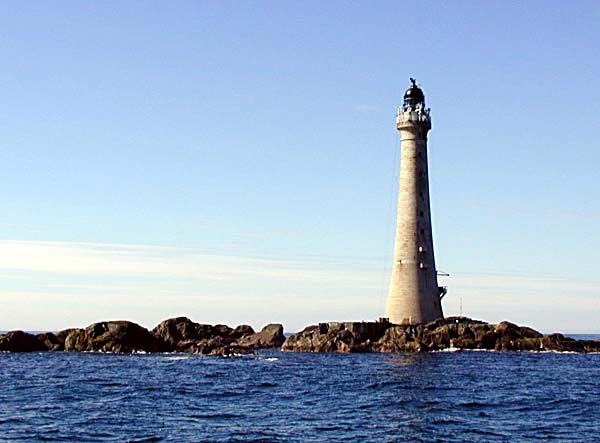
Skerryvore lighthouse

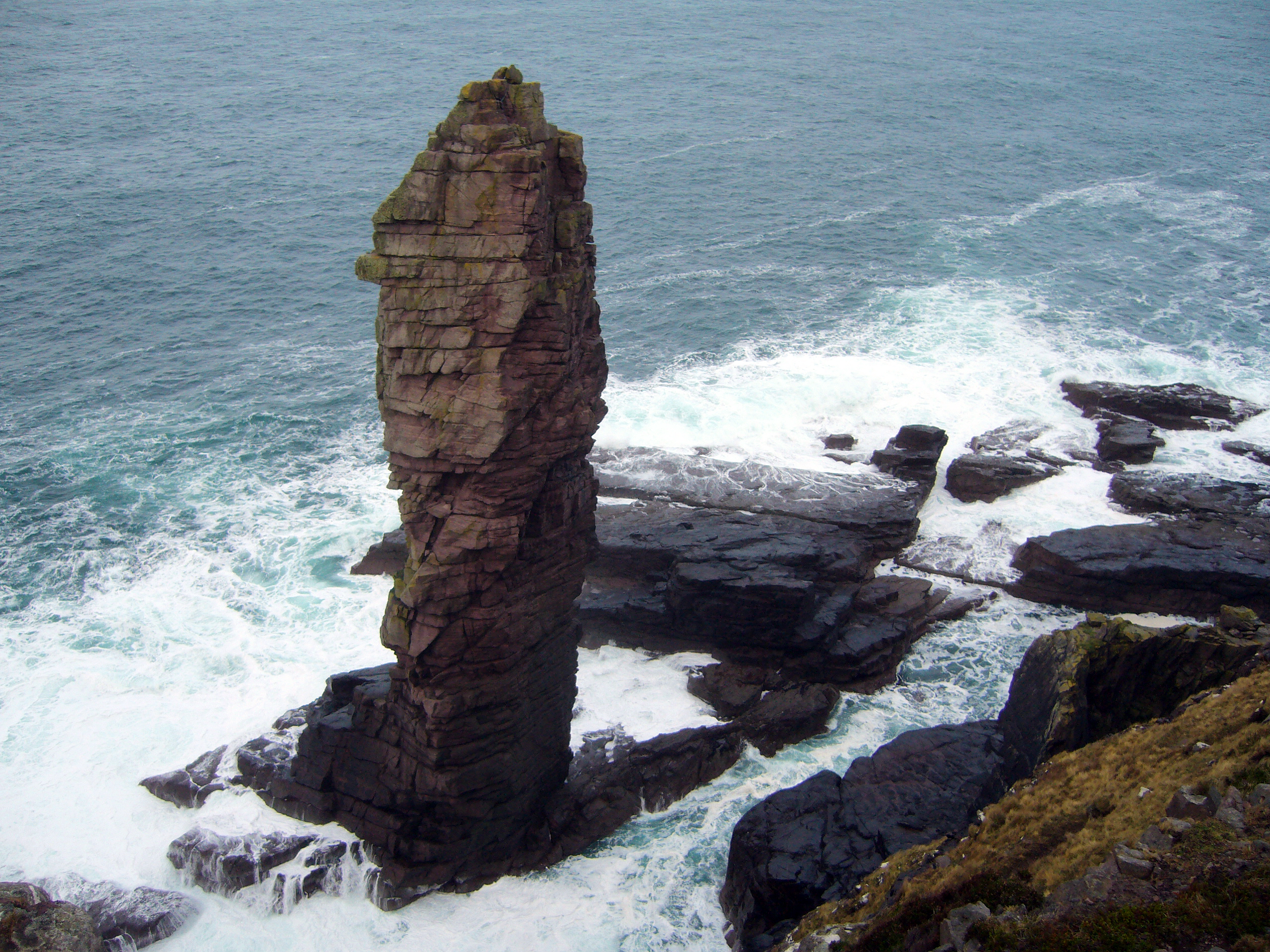
The Old Man of Stoer, a 60 metres (200 ft) high stack of Torridonian sandstone

Smaller islands, tidal islets only separated at higher stages of the tide, and skerries which are only exposed at lower stages of the tide pepper the seas surrounding the main islands. Many of them are obscure and only a few have ever been inhabited. Nonetheless, some have a significant degree of notability. Lady's Rock, a skerry in Loch Linnhe, was the site of the attempted murder of Lady Catherine Campbell by her husband Lachlan Maclean of Duart in 1527. He rowed out to the rock one night at low tide and left his wife stranded on the rock to die. Nearby Castle Stalker was in the possession of Clan Stewart of Appin at this time, but its more recent claim to fame is as a location in the film Monty Python and the Holy Grail.

Remote Dubh Artach and Skerryvore are the sites of two unmanned lighthouses; the latter reaches 48 metres (157 ft) in height and is the tallest in the United Kingdom. Belnahua supported a population of slate workers in its substantial and now flooded central quarry during the 19th century. Nearby Eilean-a-beithich once stood in the Easdale Sound between Easdale and Seil. However, it was quarried to a depth of 76 metres (249 ft) below sea level leaving only the outer rim of the island. This was eventually swept away by the sea and little visible sign of the island now remains.

In addition to being a hazard to navigation, the Torran Rocks south of Erraid are one of the locations featured in the novel Kidnapped by Robert Louis Stevenson. It was here that Alan Breck Stewart and David Balfour were ship-wrecked.

The smaller Inner Hebridean islands, grouped by location (from south to north), in the vicinity of:

=== South Argyll Coast ===
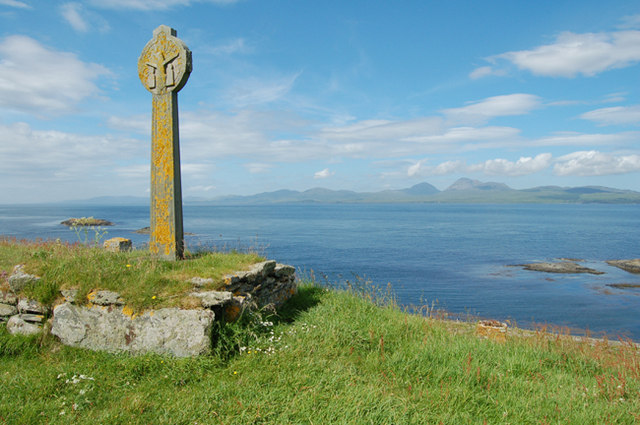
Eilean Mor in the MacCormaig Isles, looking towards Jura

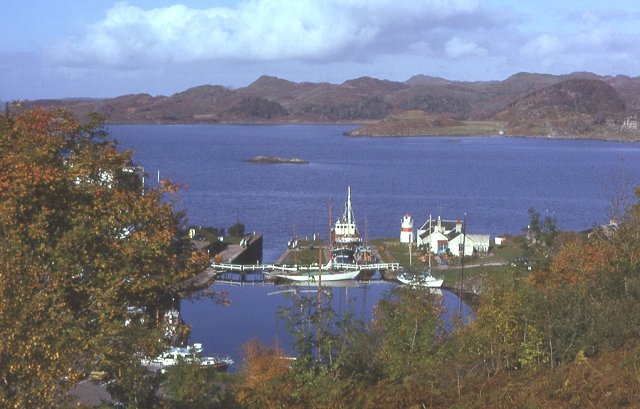
Crinan locks with tiny Black Rock beyond

- Kintyre: Mull, Scart Isle, The Merchants
- Gigha: Còrr Eilean, Craro, Eilean á Chuill, Eilean Leim, Eilean Liath, Eilean na h-Aird, Eilean na h-Uilinn, Gamhna Giogha, Gigalum
  - Cara: Coire Cara, Sgeir à Bhuntata, Sgeir Buideil
- West Loch Tarbert: Eilean Ceann na Creige, Eilean da Ghallagain, Eilean Eòghainn, Eilean nan Craobh, Eilean Traighe
- Loch Stornoway: Carriag Mhaidean, Eilean Clach nan Uamhannan, Sgeir Choigreach
- Loch Caolisport: Eilean Fada, Eilean na h-Uamhaidh, Eilean nam Muc, Eilean Naomhachd, Glas Eilean, Liath Eilein
- MacCormaig Isles: Corr Eilean, Eilean Ghamna, Eilean Mòr, Eilean nan Leac, Eilean Puirt Leithe
- Loch Sween: Cala, Eilean Mhartan, Eilean na Circe, Taynish Island, Ulva Islands
  - Danna: Eilean à Chapuill, Eilean nan Uan, Liath Eilean
  - Fairy Islands: Eilean a' Bhrein
- West Taynish: Carsaig Island, Eilean Dubh, Eilean Fraoich, Eilean nan Coinean, Eilean Traighe, Leth Sgeir, Ruadh Sgeir
- Loch Crinan: An-unalin, Black Rock, Eilean Glas, Eilean nan Coinean
- Loch Craignish: Eilean na Cille, Eilean na-h Eairne, Garbh Rèisa, Sgeir na Maoile
  - Eilean Macaskin: Liath-sgeir Bheag, Liath-sgeir Mhòr
  - Eilean Mhic Chrion: Eilean Buidhe, Eilean Dubh, Eilean Inshaig, Eilean na Nighinn, Eilean Traighte
  - Eilean Rìgh: Eilean nan Gabhar,
- West Craignish: Coiresa, Creagach Chrosgach, Culbhaic, Eilean Ona, Reisa an t-Sruith, Reisa Mhic Phaidean
- Craobh Haven: Eich Donna, Eilean an Duin, Eilean Arsa, Eilean Buidhe, Eilean Creagach, Fraoch Eilean, Liath Sgeir
- Loch Melfort: Eilean Coltair, Eilean Gamhna, Scoul Eilean

=== Islay group ===
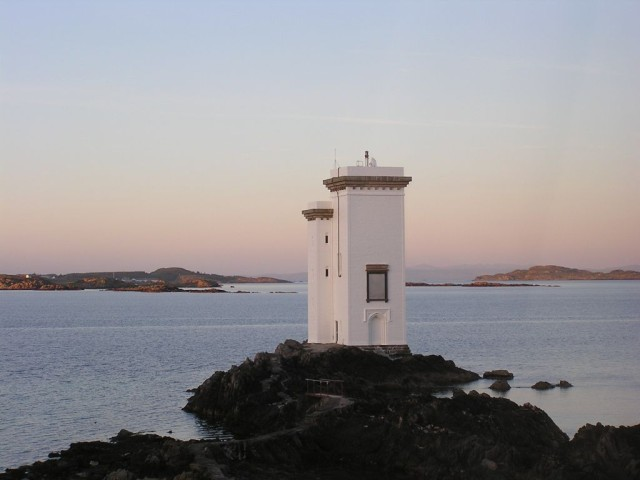
The lighthouse at Carraig Fhada, Islay, looking towards Caolas Eilean nan Caorach, Sgeir Fhada and Sgeir Phlocach with Port Ellen at left

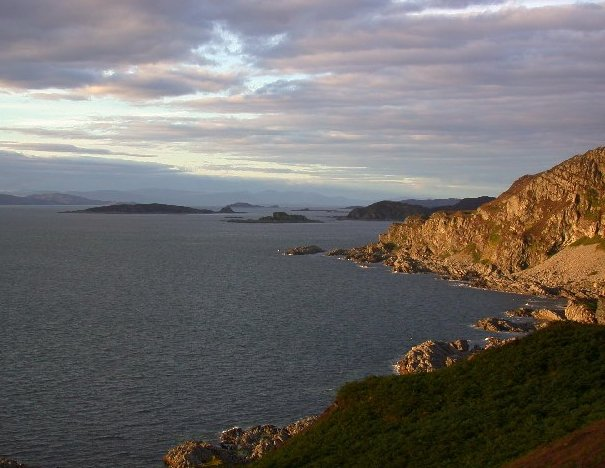
Looking north from Na h-Urrachann towards Rubha nam Faoilean, Scarba, with Guirasdeal, Lunga and Eilean Dubh Mòr in the Slate Islands beyond

- Islay:
  - Mull of Oa and Laggan Bay: Eileanan Mòra, Sgeirean Buidhe Ghil
  - Loch Indaal: Carraig Dhubh
  - Rinns of Islay: Am Ballan, Eilean Liath, Eilean Mhic Coinnich, Frenchman's Rocks, Orsay, Sgeiran Dubha
  - North west coast: Boghachan Mòra, Eilean an Tannais-sgeir, Eilean Beag, Eilean Mòr, Nave Island, Post Rocks
  - East coast: Eilean Liath
  - Kildalton: Ceann nan Sgieran, Eilean á Chùirn, Eilean an Droighinn, Eilean Bhride, Eilean Craobhach, Eilean Mhic Mhaolmhoire, Outram, Sgeir nam Ban
  - Ardbeg: Carmichael's Rocks, Cleit Buidhe, Corr Sgeir, Eilean an t-Sluic, Eilean Imersay, Iseanach Beag, Iseanach Mòr
  - Carraig Fhada: Am Plodan, An Gànradh, Eilean nan Caorach, Sgeir Fhada, Sgeir Phlocach
- Colonsay: Dubh Eilean, Eilean à Chladaich, Eilean na Brathan, Eilean Leathann, Eilean Mhártain, Eilean na Bilearach, Eilean nam Ban, Eilean nam Feannaig, Eilean Olmsa, Glas Eilean
- Jura:
  - East coast: Eilean à Bhorra, Eilean an Rubha, Eilean Buidhe Mòr, Eilean na h-Aorinn, Eilean Traigh an Airgid, Liath Eilean, Na Cuiltean
  - Small Isles: Eilean Bhride, Eilean Diomhain, Eilean nan Coinnean, Eilean nan Gabhar, Pladda
  - Sound of Islay: Am Fraoch Eilean, Brosdale Island, Glas Eilean
  - Loch Tarbert: Eilean an Easbuig, Eilean Ard, Eilean Dubh à Cumhainn Bhig, Eilean Dubh à Cumhainn Mhoir, Eileanan Gleann Righ, Eilean Iosal
  - West coast: Eilean Beag, Eilean Mòr, Shian Island
- Oronsay: Dubh Eilean, Eileanan à Chuir, Eilean Ghaoideamal, Eilean Mhic Iain Ruaidh, Eilean Mhugaig, Eilean nam Uan, Eilean nan Ron
- Scarba: Eilean à Bhealach, Eilean Ard, Sgeiran à Mhaoil, Sgeir nan Gobhar
- Texa: Sgeiran an Lòin, Tarr Sgeir

=== Firth of Lorn ===
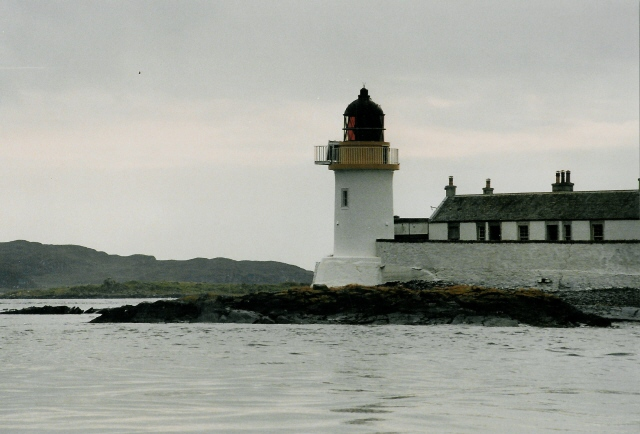
Fladda lighthouse

- Slate Islands:
  - Easdale: None
  - Eilean Dubh Mòr: Eilean Dubh Beag, Liath Sgeir, Sgeir à Gheòidh, Sgeir nan Taod
  - Insh: Dubh-sgeir, Eilean Bàn-leac
  - Luing: Diar Sgeir, Dubh-fheith, Dubh Sgeir, Eilean Loisgte, Fraoch Eilean (2), Funaich Mhòr, Glas Eilean, Rubh Aird Luing, Sgeir Bhuidhe
  - Lunga: An Tudan, Belnahua, Eilean Ioasal, Eilean nan Ceann, Fiola an Droma, Fiola Meadhonach, Fladda, Guirasdeal, Liath Sgeir, Ormsa, Rubha Fiola, Sgeir Mhic an Altair, Sgeir Poll nan Corran
  - Torsa: Eilean Fraoch, Glas Eilean
  - Seil: Eilean à Chomraidh, Eilean Buidhe, Eilean Dùin, Eilean nam Beathach, Eilean nam Freumha, Eilean Tornal, Henderson's Rock,
  - Shuna: None
- Garvellachs:
  - Eileach an Naoimh: Sgeiran Dubha, Sgeir Leth à Chuain
  - Garbh Eileach: À Chùli, Dùn Chonnuill

=== Loch Linnhe ===
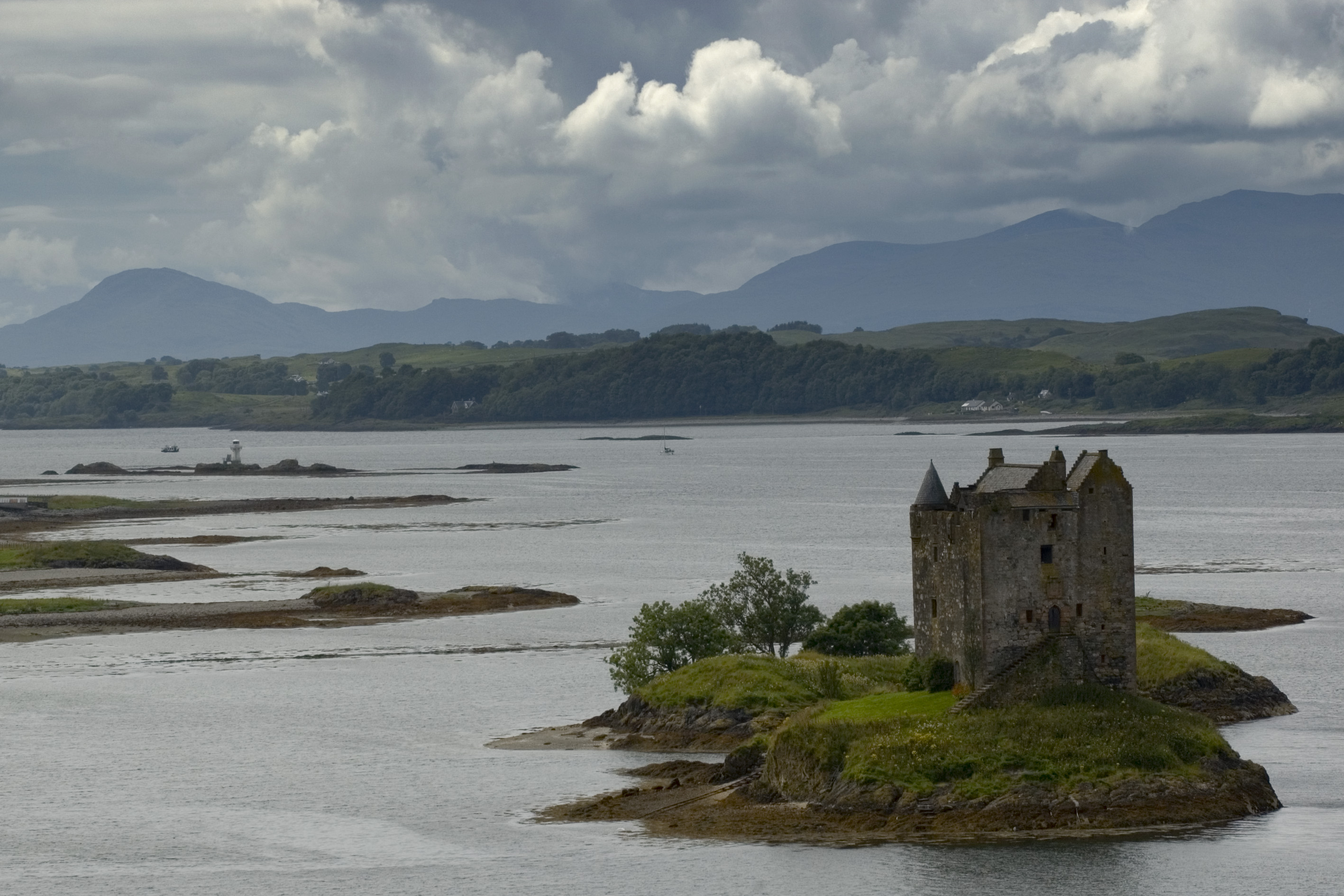
Castle Stalker

- Loch Feochan: Eilean an Ruisg
- Kerrera: Bach Island, Eilean nan Gamhna, Eilean nan Uan, Eilean Orasaig, Heather Island, (Note: This island is in the Sound of Kerrera at grid reference NM841293 but is not named by the Ordnance Survey. The name is confirmed by Oban Sailing Club.) Maiden Island, Rubh'a Cruidh, Sgeir à Gheòidh
- Loch Etive: Abbot's Isle, Eilean Beag, Eilean Mòr, Eilean nam Meann, Eilean Traighe, Kilmaronag Islands
- Eriska: Glas Eilean, Sgeir Caillich,
- Lismore: Bernera Island, Branra, Creag Island, Eilean Dubh (2), Eilean Loch Oscair, Eilean Musdile, Eilean na Cloich, Eilean nam Bàn, Eilean nam Meann, Eilean nan Caorach, Eilean nan Chaorainn, Eilean nan Gamhna, Eilean Ramsay, Inn Island, Lady's Rock, Pladda Island,
- Shuna: Eilean Balnagowan, Castle Stalker
- Loch Leven: Eilean à Chòmraidh, Eilean Coinneach, Eilean Munde, Eilean nam Ban
- Loch Eil: Eilean à Bhealaidh, Eilean na Creich, Eilean nan Craobh, Rubha Dearg

=== Mull group ===
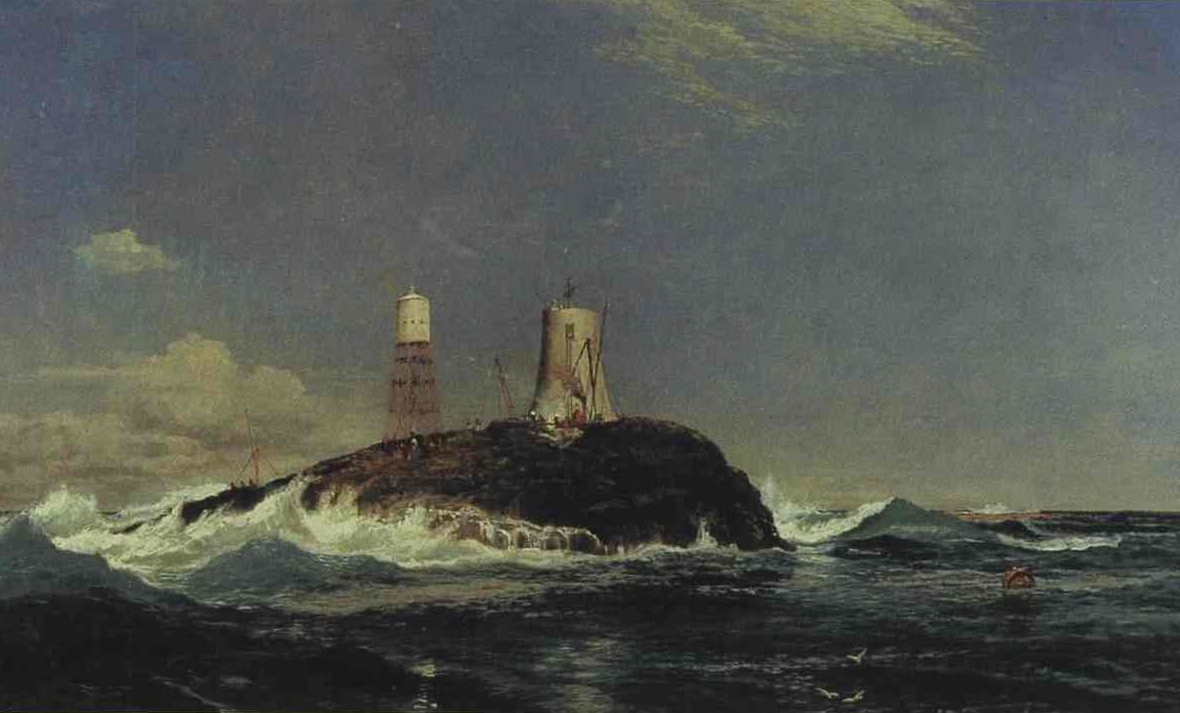
Dhu Heartach Lighthouse, During Construction by Sam Bough (1822–1878)

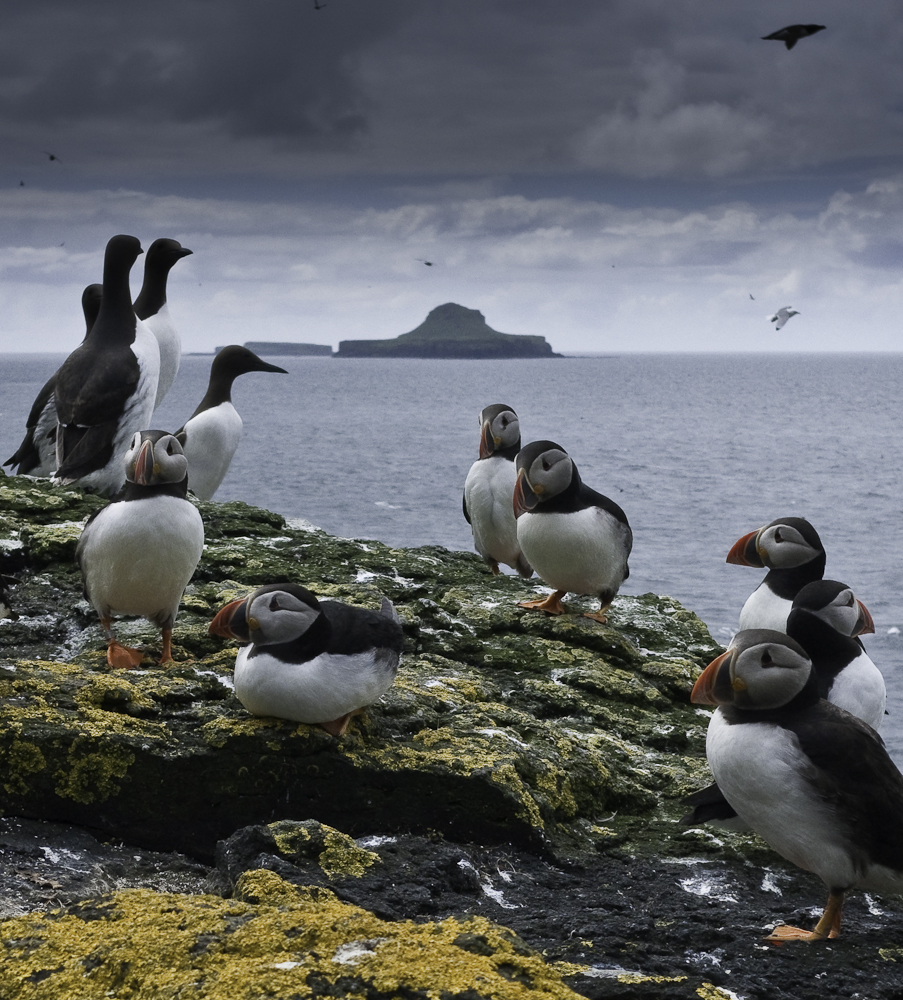
Bac Mòr, also known as "The Dutchman's Cap", as seen from Lunga

- Coll: A' Chairidhe, Airne na Sgeire, An Glas-eilean, Eag na Maoile, Eilean an Eith, Eilean an t-Sean Chaisteil, Eilean Ascaoineach, Eilean Bhoramuil, Eilean Bhuigistile, Eilean Dubh, Eilean Eatharna, Eilean Halum, Eilean Iomallach, Eilean Mòr, Eilean na Bà, Eilean nam Muc, Eilean Odhar, Eilean Ornsay, Eilean Tomaluam, Soa, Sùil Ghorm
- Eorsa: None
- Gometra: Eilean Dioghlum, Màisgier
- Gunna: Eilean nam Maidean, Eilean nan Gamhna
- Iona: Corr Eilean, Eilean Annraidh, Eilean Chalbha Eilean Didil, Eilean Musimul, Eilean na h-Aon Chaorach, Reidh Eilean, Soa Island, Stac an Aoineidh, Stac Mhic Muhurchaidh
- Inch Kenneth: Samalan Island
- Little Colonsay: None
- Mull:
  - Calve Island: Cnap à Chailbe, Eilean na Beithe
  - Sound of Mull: Am Brican, Dearg Sgeir, Eileanan Bàna, Eileanan Glasa, Eilean Bàn
  - Loch Don: Eilean Bàn, Eilean a' Mhadaidh, Eileanan nan Caorach
  - Loch Spelve: Eilean Amalaig
  - Loch Buie: Eilean Mòr, Eilean Uamh Ghuaidhre, Frank Lockwood's Island (Note: This island is named after Frank Lockwood, the brother-in-law of the 21st MacLean of Lochbuie, who was Solicitor General from 1894 to 1895.)
  - Ross of Mull south: Eilean à Chròtha, Eilean Imheir, Eilean Liath, Eilean Mòr, Eilean Nam Boc, Eilean nan Caorann, Gamhnach Mhòr, Garbh Eilean, Na Minn, Na Maoil Mhòra
  - Erraid: Am Baister, Eilean a' Chalmain, Eilean Dubh (2), Eilean Ghomain, Eilean nam Muc, Eilean na Seamair, Livingston's Rocks, Rankin's Rocks, Sgeir à Chobhain, Sgeir na Caillich
    - Torran Rocks: Dearg Sgeir, MacPhail's Anvil, Na Torrain, Torran Sgoilte, Torr an t-Saothaid
  - Sound of Iona: Eilean à Ghearrain, Eilean Dubh, Eilean Dubh na Ciste, Eilean Gainmheinich, Eilean nam Ban, Liath Eilean
  - Loch na Làthaich: Eilean an Fheòir, Eilean Bàn, Na Liathanaich
  - Loch Scridain: Eilean nan Caorach, Sgeir Leathan
  - Ardmeanach: Eilean Dubh Cruinn, Erisgeir
  - Loch na Keal: Eilean Casach, Eilean Feòir,
  - Mishnish: Cuan Mòr, Eilean an Tairt, Eilean nan Gabhar
- Staffa: Am Buchaille
- Tiree: Ceann Mòr, Chreachasdal Mòr, Eilean Ghreasamuill (2), Eilean Ghreusgain, Eilean nan Siolag, Eilean Shomhairle, Fadamull, Rubha Liath, Sgeir Mhòr, Soa
- Lunga: Bac Beag, Bac Mòr, Cairn na Burgh Beag, Cairn na Burgh Mòr, Fladda, Sgeir an Eirionnaich, Sgeir a' Chaisteil
- Ulva: Eilean à Bhuic, Eilean à Chaolais, Eilean an Dusain, Eilean an Righ, Eilean na Creiche, Eilean na h-Uamha, Eilean Reilean, Garbh Eilean, Geasgill Beag, Geasgill Mòr, Sgeir Feòir, Trealbhan
- Outliers: Dubh Artach, Skerryvore

=== Small Isles ===
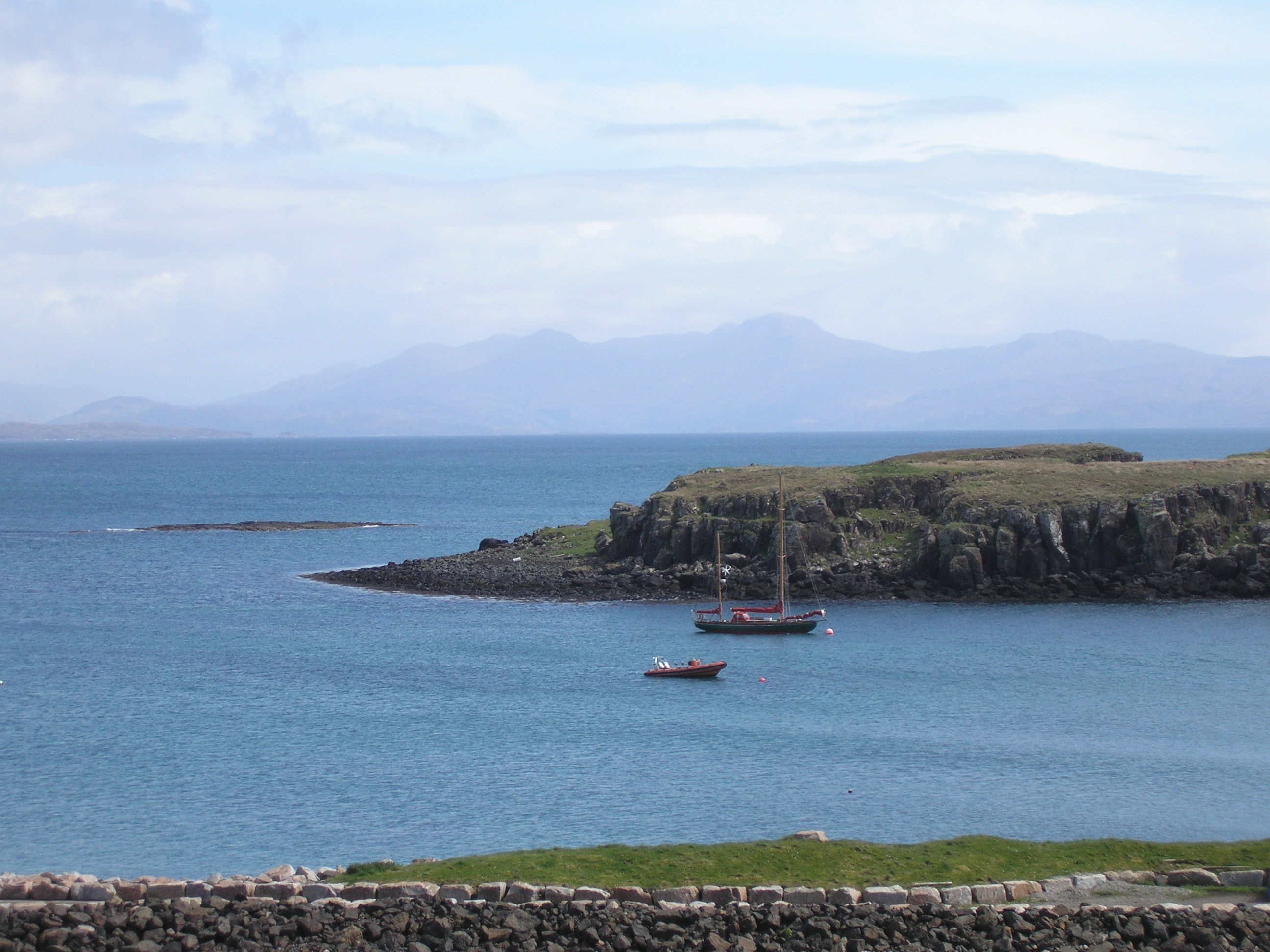
The north end of Eilean Chathastail from Eigg

- Canna: Alman, An Stéidh, Eilean à Bhaird, Haslam
- Eigg: Eilean Chathastail, Eilean Thuilm
- Muck: Eagamol, Eilean nan Each
- Rùm: None
- Sanday: Dùn Mòr
- Outliers: Garbh Sgeir, Humla, Hyskeir

=== North Argyll coast ===
From Ininmore Bay in Morvern to the River Sheil. (Note: This refers to the historic county of Argyll rather than the modern council area of Argyll and Bute. Since 1996 this section has been in the Highland council area.)

- Sound of Mull: Eilean na Beitheiche, Eilean Rubha an Ridire, Glas Eileanan, Sgeir Chorrach
- Loch Sunart: Dun Ghallain, Eilean an t-Sionnaich, Eilean à Chuilinn, Eilean à Mhuirich, Eilean Mòr, Eilean mo Shlinneag, Garbh Eilean, Glas Eilean
  - Càrna: Eilean an Fheidh, Eilean nan Eildean, Eilean nan Gabhar, Eilean nan Gad, Risga
  - Oronsay: Eilean Mòr, Sligneach Mòr
- Ardnamurchan:
  - South coast: Eilean nan Seachd Seisrichean, Glas Eilean
  - North coast: Eilean Carrach, Eilean Chaluim Cille, Eilean Dubh, Eilean na h-Acairseid, Sanna Island, Sgeir à Chàm Eilein, Sgeir an Eididh, Sgeir an Rathaid, Sgeir nam Meann
  - Kentra Bay: Eilean an Eididh Eilean Dhònuill, Eilean Dubh, Eilean Loisgte, Eilean nan Gad

=== South Highland coast ===
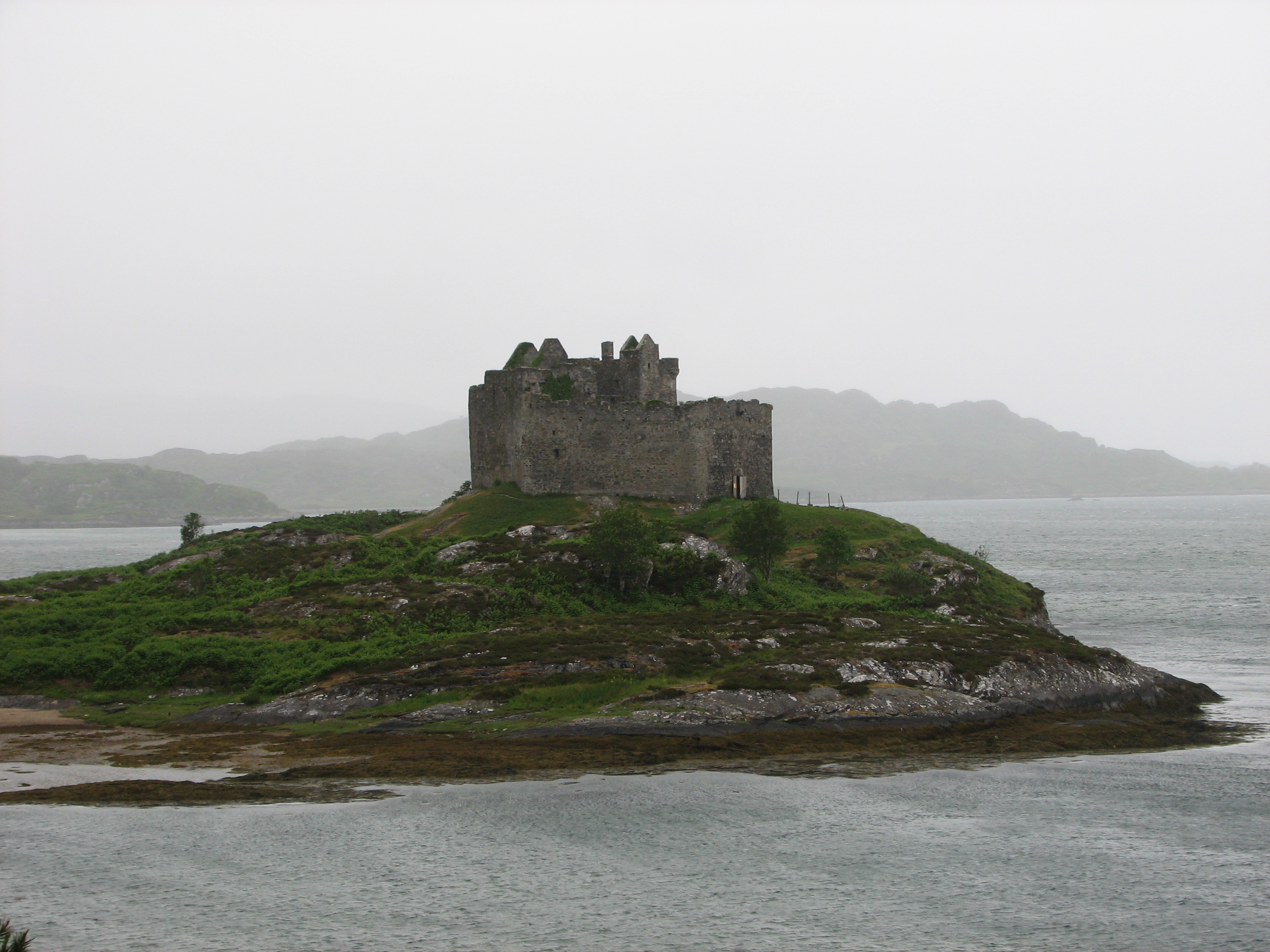
Eilean Tioram and its ruined castle

- Eilean Shona: An Glas-eilean, Eilean à Choire, Eilean an Feheidh, Eilean an t-Sabhail, Eilean Coille, Eilean Dubh, Eilean Mhic Neill, Eilean Raonuill, Eilean Tioram, Eilean Uaine, Riska
- Sound of Arisaig:
  - Loch Ailort: Eilean à Bhuic, Eilean à Chaolais, Eilean Buidhe, Eilean Dubh, Eilean Dubh an Aonaich, Eilean na Gualinn, Eilean nam Bairneach, Eilean nan Gabhar, Eilean nan Trom, Samalaman Island, Sgeir Glas
  - Loch nan Uamh: Am Fraoch-eilean, An Garbh-eilean, An Glas-eilean, Còrr Eilean, Eilean à Ghaill, Eilean Aird nam Bùth, Eilean an t-Snidhe, Eilean Ceann Fèidh, Eilean Gobhlach, Eilean nan Cabar, Eilean Port nam Murrach
- Eilean Ighe: Am Fraoch-eilean, Eilean Ban, Luinga Beag, Luinga Mhòr
- North Arisaig coast: An Glas-eilean, Bogh' Oitir, Rubha dà Chuain, Sgeirean na Corra-gribhich
- Morar Bay: Eilean Ruadh, Eilean Toigal
- Mallaig: Eilean na h-Acairseid
- Loch Nevis: An Corr-eilean, Eilean Giubhais, Eilean Maol, Eilean na Glaschoille,
- West Knoydart coast: Airor Island, Eilean an t-Sionnach, Eilean Dearg, Eilean na Gàmhna, Eilean Shamadalain, Glas Eilean, Sgeir Glas
- Loch Hourn: Corr Eileanan, Eilean à Chuilinn, Eilean à Gharb-Iain, Eilean à Mhuineil, Eilean à Phiobaire, Eilean Chamas nan Doth, Eilean Chlamial, Eilean Choinnich, Eilean Mhartain, Eilean Mhogh-sgeir, Eilean Ràrsaidh, Eilean Tioram, Fraoch Eilean, Glas Eilean
- Sandaig Islands: An Gurraban, Eilean Carach, Eilean Mòr Fraoich Eilean

=== Skye group ===
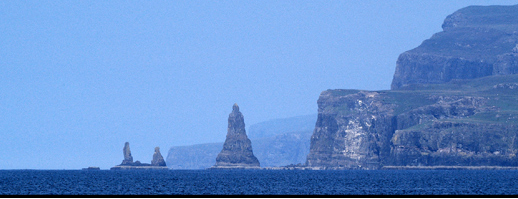
Macleod's Maidens off the coast of Duirinish

- Crowlin Islands:
  - Eilean Mòr: None
  - Eilean Meadhonach: Eilean Beag,
- Eilean Bàn: None
- Eilean Trodday: None
- Isay: Clett, Mingay
- Longay: None
- Pabay: None
- Raasay: Eilean Aird nan Gobhar, Eilean an Inbhire, Holoman Island, Manish Island
  - Eilean Fladday: Fraoch Eilean, Glas Eilean, Griana-sgeir
  - Eilean Tigh: Eilean an Fhraoich
- Rona: Cow Rock, Eilean Garbh, Eilean Seamraig, Garbh Eilean, Sgeirean Buidhe Borlum, Sgeir Shuas
- Scalpay: Eilean Leac na Gainimh, Guillamon Island, Sgeir Dhearg
- Skye:
  - Sleat: Eilean Dubh, Eilean Ruairidh, Eilean Sgorach
  - Ornsay: Eilean an Eòin, Eilean Sionnach
  - Loch Eishort north coast: Eilean Gaineamhach Boreraig, Eilean Heast
  - Strathaird: Eilean na h-Àirde
  - Minginish: An Dubh-sgeir, Eilean Glas, Eilean Reamhar, Stac à Mheadais
  - Loch Bracadale: Oronsay, Sula Skerry, Tarner Island
    - Harlosh Island: None
  - Duirinish: An Dubh Sgeir, An Stac, Macleod's Maidens
  - Loch Dunvegan: Carraig Shleamhuinn, Eilean Dubh, Eilean Dubh Beag, Eilean Glas, Eilean Grianal, Eilean Mòr, Eilean na h-Eigheach, Eilean Traigh, Garay Island, Garbh Eilean, Lampay
  - Waternish: Caisteal an Fhithich
  - Loch Snizort: Eilean Beag, Eilean Mòr
    - Ascrib Islands: Eilean Creagach, Eilean Garave, Eilean Iosal, Sgeir à Chapuill, Sgeir à Chuin, South Ascrib
  - Trotternish: An t-Iasgair, Eilean Chaluim-chille, Eilean Flodigarry, Holm Island, Sgeir na Eireann, Staffin Island, Tulm Island,
    - Fladda-chùain group: Fladaigh Chuain, Gaeilavore Island, Gearran, Lord MacDonald's Table (Am Bord), The Cleats, Thon Eilean
  - Broadford Bay: Eilean na Ruadhaich, Glas Eilean, Sgeir Dubh
  - Loch Alsh: Sgeir na Caillich
- Soay: Na Gamhnaichean
- Wiay: None

=== North Highland coast ===
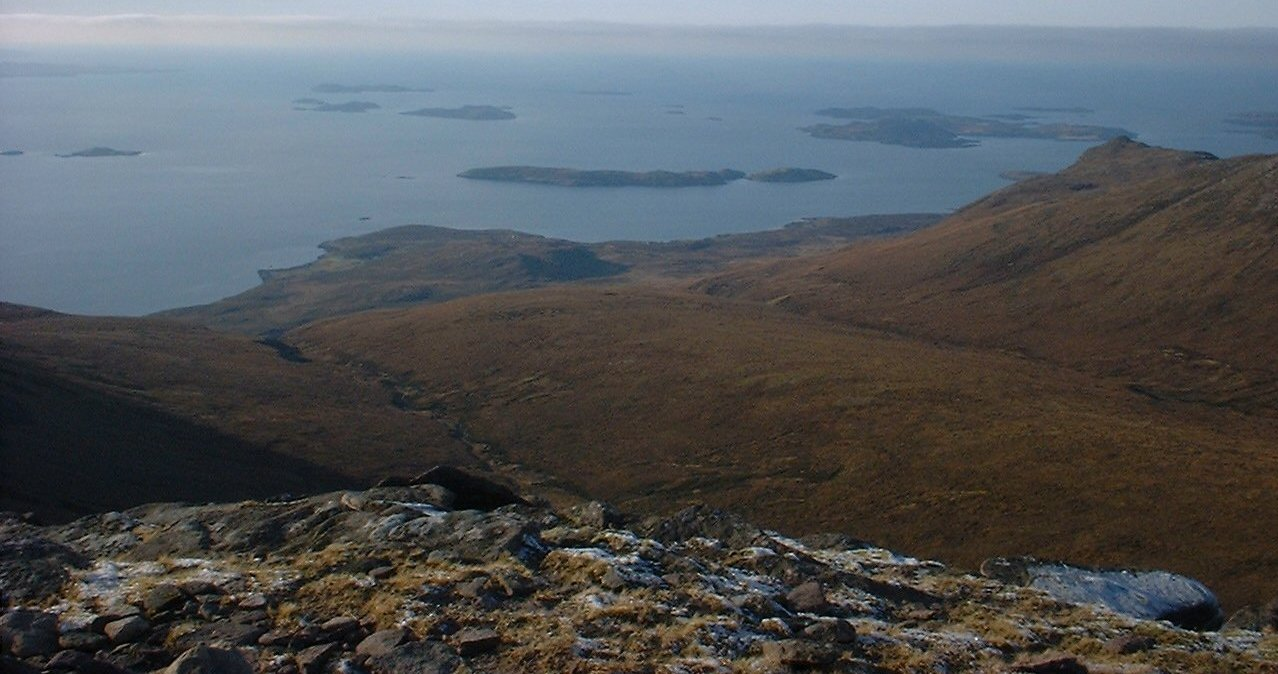
The Summer Isles from Ben Mòr Coigach

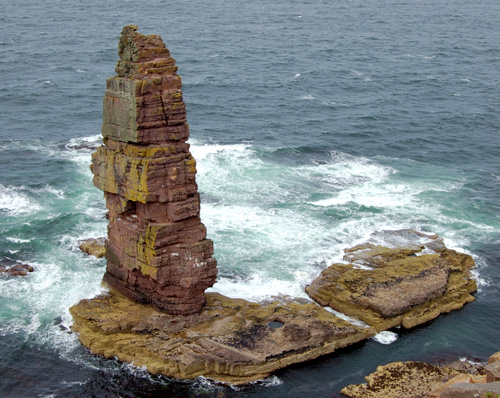
Am Buachaille – "the shepherd"

- Wester Ross:
  - Loch Alsh: Glas Eilean
    - Loch Long: À Ghlas-sgeir, Sheep Island
    - Eilean Donan: Eilean Tioram
    - Loch Duich: Am Fraoch-eilean
  - Kyle of Lochalsh: Black Islands, Eilean à Mhal, Eileanan Dubha, Eilean na Crèadha, Eilean nan Gobhar Beag, Eilean nan Gobhar Mòr
  - Loch Carron: An Garbh-Eilean, Eilean an-t-Sratha, Eilean Glasiach, Eilean na Beinne, Eilean na Creige Duibhe, Eilean nan Fraoich, Eilean nan Stac, Kishorn Island, Sgeir Bhuidhe, Sgeir Fhada, Strome Islands,
    - Plockton: À Ghlas-leac, An Garbh-Eilean, Eilean à Bhata, Eilean à Chait, Eilean an Duine, Eilean Dubh, Eilean Dubh Dhurinis, Eilean Lagach, Eilean na Bà Beag, Eilean na Bà Mòr, Eilean nam Fiadh, Eilean na Sgeir-Feor, Eilean nan Gamhainn, Eilean Stacan, Eilean Sgreabach, Sgeir Bhuidhe
  - Inner Sound: An Ruadh-Eilean, Eilean Chuaig, Eilean na Bà, Eilean nan Naomh,
  - Loch Torridon: Eilean à Chaoil, Eilean an Inbhire Bhàin, Eilean Dùghaill, Eilean Mòr, Eilean Tioram, Sgeir Ghlas, Sgeir na Trian, Shieldaig Island
  - Eilean Horrisdale: Eilean Tioram, Sgeir Glas
  - Gairloch: Eilean an t-Sabhail, Eilean Shieldaig, Fraoch-eilean, Glas Eilean, Na Dùnain
  - Longa Island: None
  - Rubha Rèidh: An Sean Sgeir, Stac Buidhe, Stac Dubh
  - Isle of Ewe: Boor Rocks, Eilean Furadh Beag, Eilean Furadh Mòr, Sgeir an Araig, Sgeir Maol Mhoraidh, Sgeir Maol Mhoraidh Shuas, Stac Ruadh
  - Gruinard: Fraoch, Eilean Beag, Fraoch Eilean Mòr
  - Summer Isles:
    - Horse Island: Càrn nan Sgeir, Meall nan Caorach, Meall nan Gabhar
    - Isle Martin: None
    - Isle Ristol: Bò Bhùiridh, Eilean Glas, Eilean Mullagrach
    - Priest Island: Bottle Island, Carn Deas, Carn Iar, Eilean Dubh, Glas-leac Beag, Sgeirean Glasa, Sgeir nam Mult
    - Tanera Beag: Eilean à Chàr, Eilean Choinaid, Eilean Fada Beag, Eilean Fada Mòr, Glas-leac Mòr, Sgeir an Aon Iomairt, Sgeir Loisgte, Sgeir nam Feusgan, Sgeir Ribhinn, Stac Mhic Aonghais
    - Tanera Mor: Eilean à Bhuic, Eilean Beag, Eilean Mòr, Eilean na Saille
  - Enard Bay: À Chleit, Eilean Mòineseach, Eilean Mòr, Fraochlan, Green Island, Rubha à Bhrocaire, Sgeir Bhuidhe, Sgeir Ghlas Bheag, Sgeir Ghlas Mhòr, Sgeir nam Boc
- Sutherland:

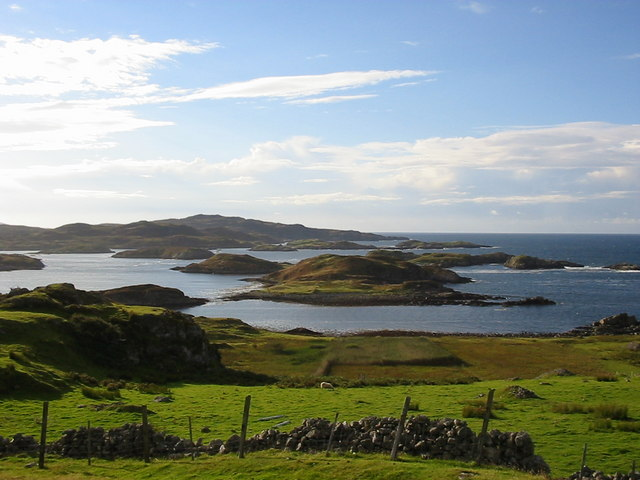
The islets east of Oldany with Mòr Eilean in the foreground

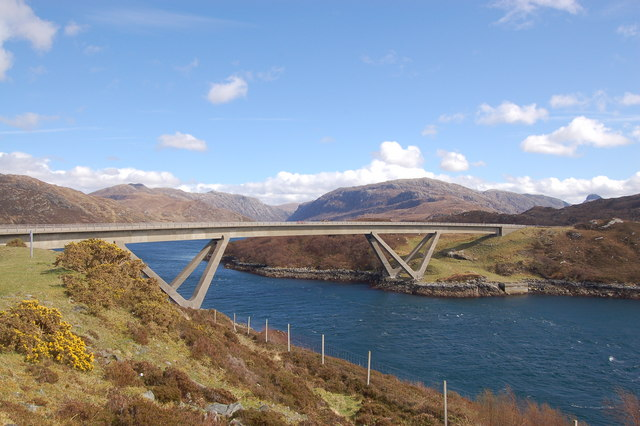
The Kylesku bridge crossing the Loch a' Chàirn Bhàin narrows with Garbh Eilean in the foreground.

  - Loch Inver: Glas Leac, Soyea Island
  - Stoer: Old Man of Stoer
  - Oldany: Bogh' an Tairbh, Eilean Chrona, Eilean na Ligheach, Eilean nam Boc, Eilean nan Gobhar, Eilean nan Uan, Mòr Eilean, Sgeir nan Gall
  - Eddrachillis Bay: An Calbh, Eilean à Bhuic, Eilean Rairidh, Meall Beag, Meall Mòr, Sgeir à Chlaidheimh
    - Badcall Bay: Dubh Sgeir, Eilean à Bhreitheimh, Eilean Garbh, Eilean na Bearachd, Eilean na Rainich, Eilean Riabhach, Glas Leac, Meall Earca, Ox Rock
    - Loch a' Chàirn Bhàin: Eilean à Ghamhna, Eilean na Furaradh, Eilean na Rainich, Garbh Eilean
    - Loch Glencoul: Creag Bàgh an Liath Bhaid, Eilean à Chon' à Chreige, Eilean à Chumhainn, Eilean an Tighe, Eilean an Tuim, Eilean Àrd, Eilean na Moine
  - Loch Dhrombaig: Cul Eilean, Eilean an Achaidh, Sgeir Liath,
  - Handa: Eilean an Aigeich, Glas Leac, Sgeirean Glasa
  - Loch Laxford: Dubh Sgeirean, Eilean à Chadh-fi, Eilean à Mhadaidh, Eileanan Dubha, Eilean an Eireannaich, Eilean an t-Sithein, Eilean Àrd, Eilean Dubh an Teoir, Eilean Dubh na Fionndalach Bige, Eilean Dubh nam Boc, Eilean Meall à Chaorainn, Eilean na Carraig, Eilean na Saille, Eilean Port à Choit, Glas Leac, Rubh' à Cheathraimh Ghairbh, Sgeirean Cruaidhe, Sgeir Eorna, Sgeir Fhanda, Sgeir Iosal, Sgeir Ruadh
  - Kinlochbervie: Eilean à Chonnaidh, Eilean Dubh, Glas Leac, Na Clusnadh
  - Eilean an Ròin Mòr: Dubh Sgeir, Eilean an Ròin Beag, Eilean na h-Aiteg, Na Stacan, Seana Sgeir
  - Sandwood Bay and Cape Wrath: Am Balg, Am Bodach, Am Buchaille, Goedha Ruadh na Fola

== Small archipelagos ==
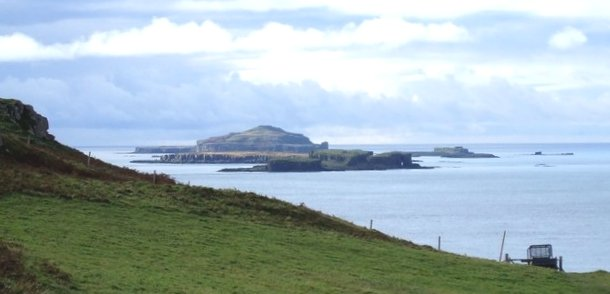
The Treshnish Isles as seen from Port Haunn on Mull. Nearest are Cairn na Burgh Beag and Cairn na Burgh Mòr. Behind are the low flat island of Fladda and the tallest island, Lunga, which obscures Bac Mòr and Bac Beag beyond.

There are various small island groups within the Inner Hebrides that are included above. The largest of these mini-archipelagos are:

- The Ascrib Islands in Loch Snizort off the northwest coast of Skye.
- The Crowlin Islands in the Inner Sound between Skye and Applecross.
- The Garvellachs north of Scarba in the Firth of Lorne.
- The MacCormaig Isles off Kintyre south of Danna.
- The Sandaig Islands south of Glenelg in the Sound of Sleat.
- The Slate Islands north of Jura and southwest of Oban.
- The Small Isles south of Skye and west of Mallaig.
- The Summer Isles in Loch Broom northwest of Ullapool.
- The Treshnish Isles west of Mull and north of Iona.

There is another group of islets off Craighouse on the east coast of Jura called the Small Isles.

== See also ==
- Rathlin Island
- List of Outer Hebrides
- List of islands of Scotland
- List of islands of the British Isles

== References and footnotes ==
General references

- Baird, Bob (1995) Shipwrecks of the West of Scotland. Glasgow. Nekton Books. ISBN 1-897995-02-4
- Haswell-Smith, Hamish (2004). The Scottish Islands. Edinburgh: Canongate. ISBN 978-1-84195-454-7.
- Hunter, James (2000) Last of the Free: A History of the Highlands and Islands of Scotland. Edinburgh. Mainstream. ISBN 1-84018-376-4
- Keay, J. & Keay, J. (1994) Collins Encyclopaedia of Scotland. London. HarperCollins.
- Mac an Tàilleir, Iain (2003) Goireasan Cànain / Language Resources - Tadhail is Ionnsaich : Pàrlamaid na h-Alba. (pdf) Pàrlamaid na h-Alba. Retrieved 26 October 2025.
- Maclean, Charles (1977) Island on the Edge of the World: the Story of St. Kilda. Edinburgh. Canongate. ISBN 0-903937-41-7
- Ordnance Survey. OS Maps Online (Map). 1:25,000. Leisure.
- Murray, W.H. (1973) The Islands of Western Scotland. London. Eyre Methuen. ISBN 0-413-30380-2

Notes

Citations
