= St Fionnlagh's Chapel =

Ruined chapel in Argyll and Bute, Scotland

Coordinates: 55.6352°N 5.7488°W

St Fionnlagh's Chapel (St Finla's Chapel) is a ruined medieval chapel on Cara Island, Argyll and Bute, Scotland. First recorded in the 15th century, the chapel was dedicated to St Fionnlagh. The remains are protected as a category B listed building.
