= Eilean Dearg =

Eilean Dearg may refer to:

- Eilean Dearg, Loch Ruel, Argyll, Scotland
- Eilean Dearg, Knoydart, an island in the Inner Hebrides
