= Dry Island =

Inhabited island of Scotland

Eilean Tioram (Gaelic)
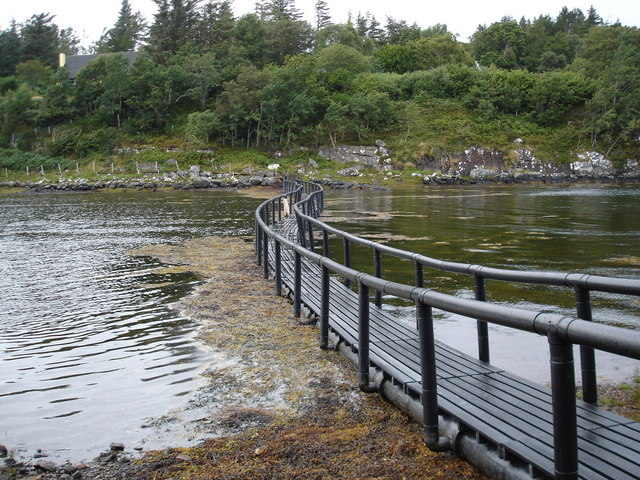
- The floating bridge to Dry Island

Location
- Dry Island shown within Highland Scotland
- OS grid reference: NG781740
- Coordinates: 57.701°N 5.725°W

Physical geography
- Island group: Wester Ross
- Area: 1.62 ha (4 acres)
- Highest elevation: 10 metres (33 ft)

Administration
- Council area: Highland
- Country: Scotland
- Sovereign state: United Kingdom

Demographics
- Population: 5
- Population rank: 80=

Dry Island is an inhabited island in Loch Gairloch in Wester Ross, Scotland, and part of the Inner Hebrides. Dry Island is translated from the Gaelic name for the Island "Eilean Tioram".

== Geography ==
Dry Island is located on the small harbour of Badachro and sheltered by Eilean Horrisdale, the largest island in Loch Gairloch. It is connected to the mainland by a floating footbridge built in the 1990s. Next to Dry Island is the smaller Island, Sgeir Ghlas, which can be reached by foot during low tide or by boat.

In 2011, the island was classified by the National Records of Scotland as one of 93 "inhabited islands in Scotland with usual residents, including those joined to the mainland or to other islands by a bridge, causeway or ford." The 2022 census recorded a population of five living there.

Dry Island is currently owned by Ian McWhinney, a descendant of the Mackenzies. Since the 15th century, his family have lived, fished and farmed in the area. Nowadays Dry Island is the home of the family as well as the base of the fishing business owned by the McWhinneys. Additionally Dry Island is used as a guest accommodation with three guest houses and the starting point of the shellfish safari on McWhinney's working creel boat.

== History ==
At the end of the nineteenth century, Dry Island was one of two curing stations at the busy fishing center of Badachro and the dried fish, herring and cod was "exported all over Europe and to the Caribbean." Nowadays, there are still few boats fishing for langoustines and crabs, which are exported to the south of Scotland, all over England and in Europe.

Built around 1840, the former fishing station including the family house and the jetty on Dry Island are listed buildings by the Historic Environment Scotland.

== Micronation ==
After being dissatisfied with the 'politics of distant shores' as well as supporting a more local government, the owner of Dry Island claimed independence before the 2010 election under the name of the micronation of Islonia.
