= Oldany Island =

Tidal island in Assynt, Sutherland, north-west Scotland

Location
- Location within Sutherland
- OS grid reference: NC088345
- Coordinates: 58.26°N 5.26°W

Name
- Name meaning: fruit

Physical geography
- Island group: Highland / Islands of Sutherland
- Area: 200 ha
- Area rank: 109
- Highest elevation: Sidhean nan Ealachan 104 m

Administration
- Council area: Highland Council
- Country: Scotland
- Sovereign state: United Kingdom

Demographics
- Population: 0

Oldany Island (formerly Oldney Island) is an uninhabited island in Assynt, Sutherland, north-west Scotland.

The name is Norse in origin and possibly means fruit.

== Geography ==
Oldany Island is a large tidal island at the southwestern entrance to Eddrachillis Bay/Kylesku. It has an area of 200 hectares (500 acres) and its highest point is Sìdhean nan Ealachan (The Swans' Fairy Mound) at 104 metres (341 ft). Handa Island is to the north, across Eddrachillis Bay; Eilean Chrona is to the south west and Sgeir nan Gall (Norsemen's Skerry) is to the north. The island is part of the Assynt-Coigach National Scenic Area, one of 40 in Scotland.

The settlement of Oldany is on the adjacent mainland. The island has long been used for grazing sheep. Oldany island is owned by the Turner family.

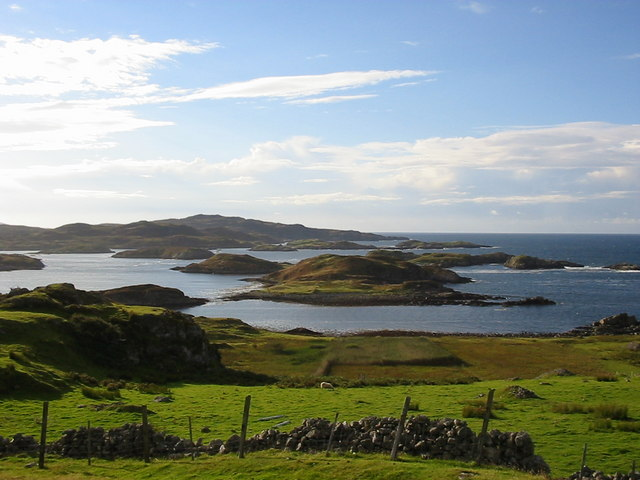
View of Oldany Island from Culkein Drumbeg (mainland), showing many of the islets to the island's east.

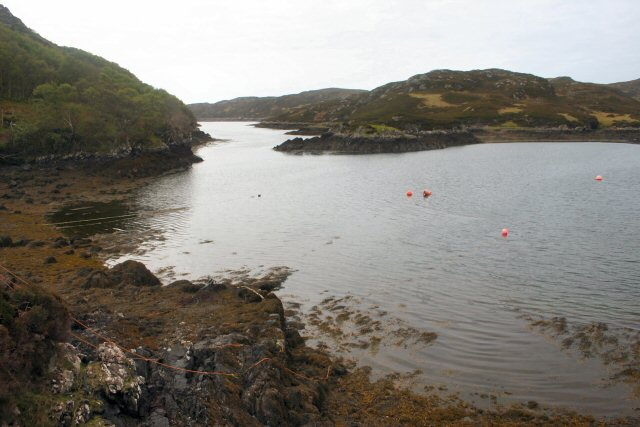
Oldany Island on the right, seen from the mainland (left)
