= Calbha Beag =

Uninhabited island in Scotland

Calbha Beag (Gaelic)

Location
- Location within Sutherland
- OS grid reference: NC156367
- Coordinates: 58.28°N 05.14°W

Name
- Name meaning: Little calf island

Physical geography
- Island group: Islands of Sutherland
- Area: 45 hectares (110 acres)
- Area rank: 210= (?)
- Highest elevation: 41 metres (135 ft)

Administration
- Council area: Highland
- Country: Scotland
- Sovereign state: United Kingdom

Demographics
- Population: Uninhabited

Calbha Beag is an uninhabited island in Eddrachillis Bay, off Sutherland, Highland, Scotland. It is immediately to the west of Calbha Mor.

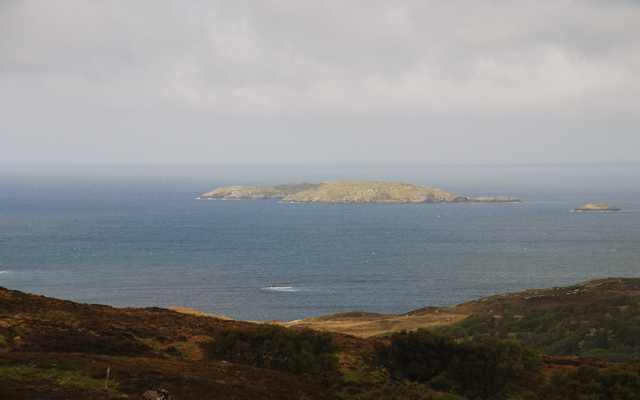

An estimate of the area from Ordnance Survey suggest a figure of about 31 hectares (77 acres), although it has been listed by Rick Livingstone as totalling 45 hectares (110 acres), possibly including areas exposed at low tide.
