= Calbha Mòr =

Tidal islet in Sutherland, Scotland

Calbha Mòr (Gaelic)
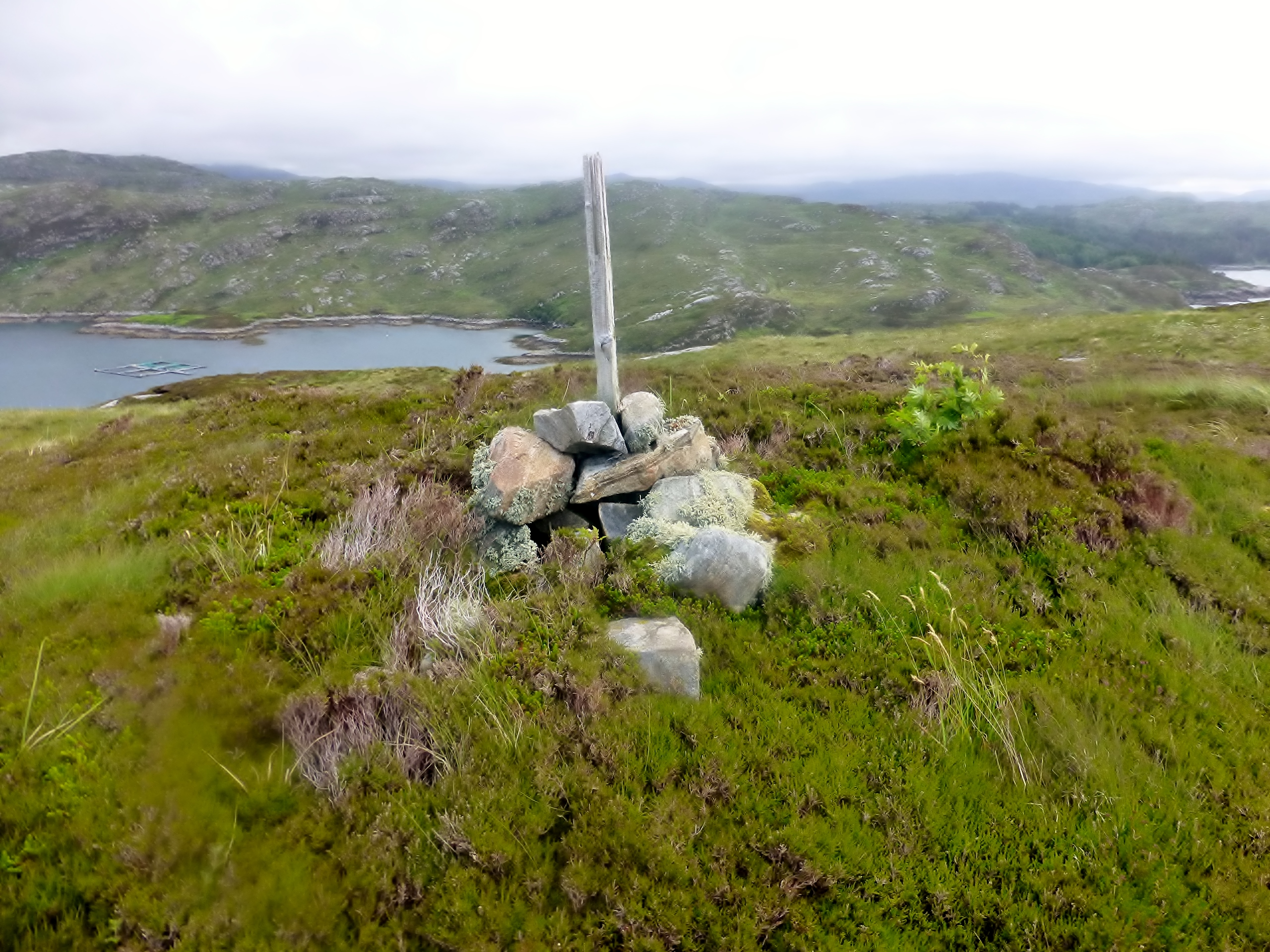

Location
- Location within Sutherland
- OS grid reference: NC167367
- Coordinates: 58.28°N 5.13°W

Name
- Name meaning: Large calf island

Physical geography
- Island group: Islands of Sutherland
- Area: 70 ha
- Area rank: 174=
- Highest elevation: 67 m (220 ft)

Administration
- Council area: Highland
- Country: Scotland
- Sovereign state: United Kingdom

Demographics
- Population: Uninhabited

Calbha Mòr is a tidal islet in Eddrachillis Bay, Sutherland, Scotland.

== Geography ==
Calbha Mòr lies north of the Kylesku Bridge and west of the Duartmore Forest, in a location that is relatively inaccessible from the A894 road. It covers 70 hectares (170 acres) and comprises two rounded hills, the higher of which reaches 67 metres (220 ft).

It is separated from its smaller neighbour, Calbha Beag, by a channel 11 metres (36 ft) deep. Calbha Beag is 45 hectares (110 acres) in area.

The sheltered Bàgh Chalbha lies to the east and a major fish escape from a fish farm took place here in 2003.
