= Gair Loch =

Sea loch on the North West coast of Highland, Scotland

Coordinates: 57.7179°N 5.7321°W

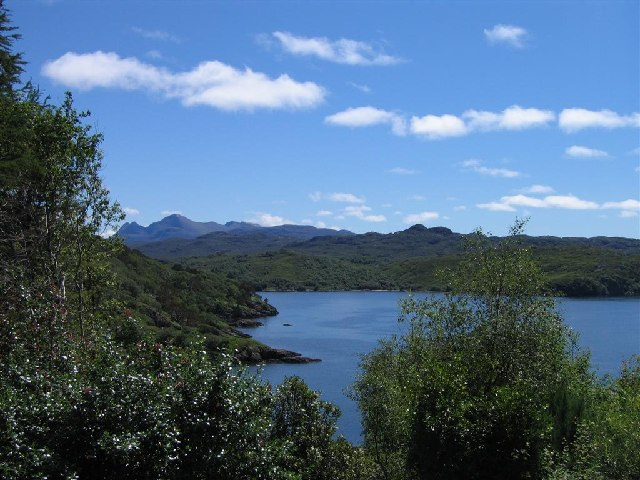
Loch Gairloch, from above Gairloch Harbour. The summits of Beinn Alligin in Torridon are in the distance.

The Gair Loch is a sea loch on the North West coast of Highland, Scotland. In Scottish Gaelic it is an Geàrr Loch meaning 'the short loch'. Around 6 miles (9.7 km) long by 1.5 miles (2.4 km) wide, it leads west to the Little Minch. The B8021 and B8056 run around its northern and southern shores respectively, connecting the villages of Gairloch, Charlestown, Kerrysdale, Shieldaig, Badachro, and Port Henderson. Longa Island lies at the loch's entrance.

The Loch has a number of small islands in it, Eilean Horrisdale supported a fishing community in the 19th century.
