= Eilean Mòr, Loch Dunvegan =

Island in Loch Dunvegan, Highland, Scotland

Eilean Mòr
Eilean Mòr (Gaelic)

Location
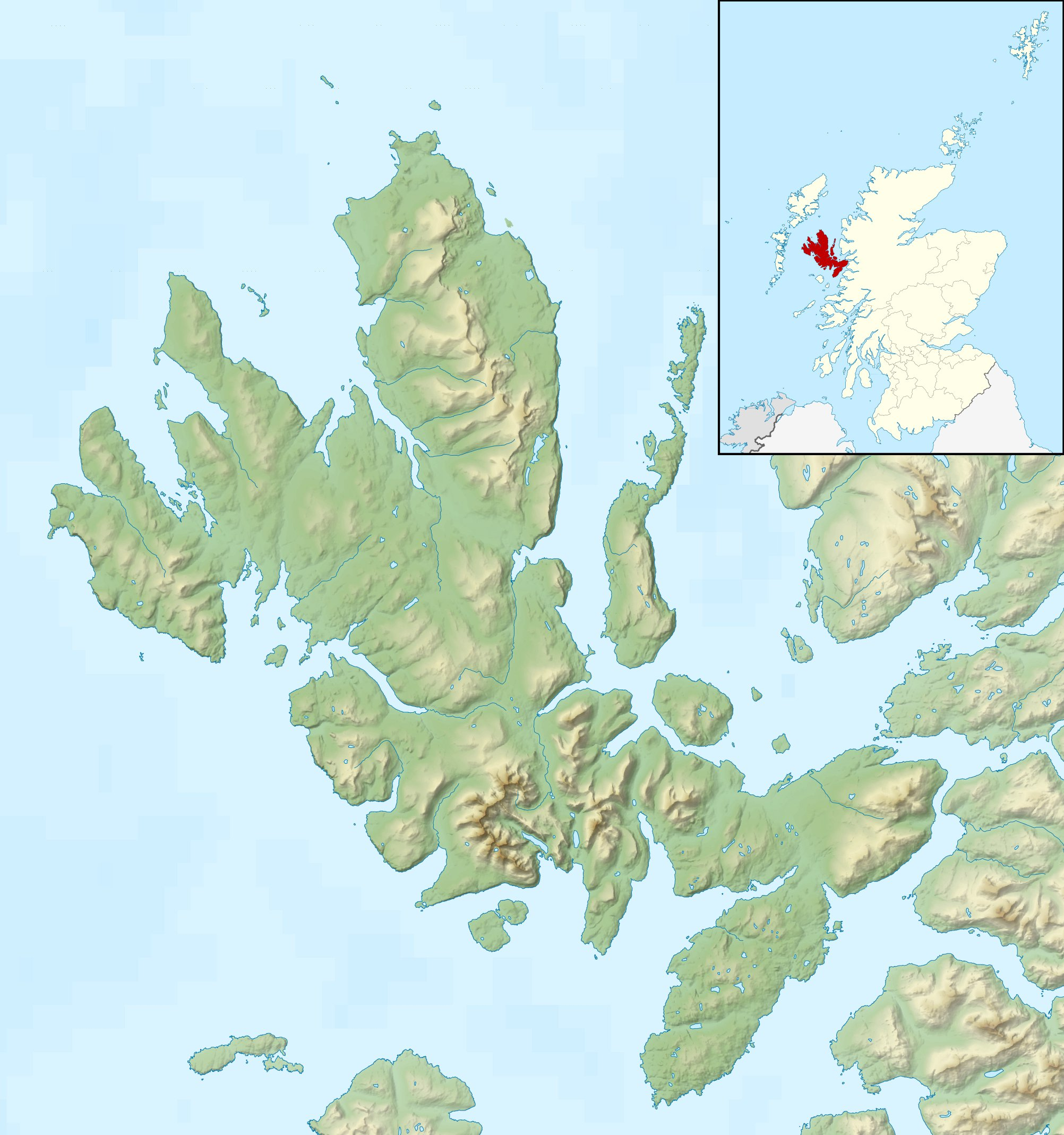
- Eilean Mòr shown relative to Skye
- OS grid reference: NG226487
- Coordinates: 57.444°N 6.624°W

Name
- Name meaning: big island

Physical geography
- Island group: Skye
- Area: 17 hectares (42 acres)
- Highest elevation: 23 metres (75 ft)

Administration
- Council area: Highland
- Country: Scotland
- Sovereign state: United Kingdom

Demographics
- Population: 0

Eilean Mòr is an uninhabited island in Loch Dunvegan in north west Skye, Scotland. At low water the island is connected to Eilean Dubh.

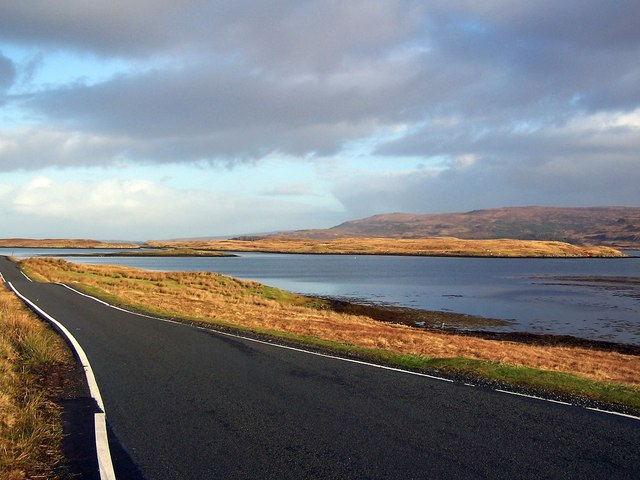
Eilean Mòr beyond Loch Erghallan
