= Longa Island =

Uninhabited island at the mouth of Loch Gairloch, Scotland

Longa (Gaelic)

Location
- Longa Island shown within Highland Scotland
- OS grid reference: NG736776
- Coordinates: 57.72°N 5.8°W

Name
- Name meaning: Gaelic, 'long' Old Norse 'ship Island'
- Old Norse name: Possibly Long-øy

Physical geography
- Island group: Highland
- Area: 126 ha (1/2 sq mi)
- Area rank: 132
- Highest elevation: Druim am Eilean 70 m (230 ft)

Administration
- Council area: Highland Council
- Country: Scotland
- Sovereign state: United Kingdom

Demographics
- Population: 0

Longa Island (Gaelic: Longa) is a small uninhabited island at the mouth of Loch Gairloch, on the west coast of Scotland. Longa is nearly one mile (1.5 kilometres) in length with an area of 126 hectares (310 acres) and a maximum elevation of 70 metres (230 ft) above sea level.

== Geology ==
The island is mainly sandstone covered with grass and heather.

== Economy ==
In the early nineteenth century, there was a small fishing community, but by the late nineteenth century, the island had become deserted. Today only sheep graze the island in the summer months.

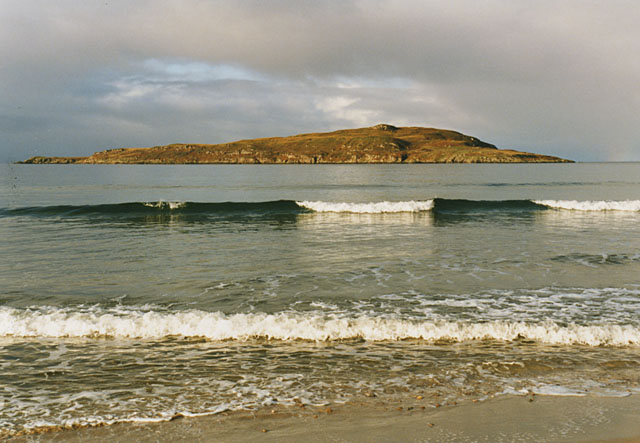
Longa Island, across the Caolas Beag

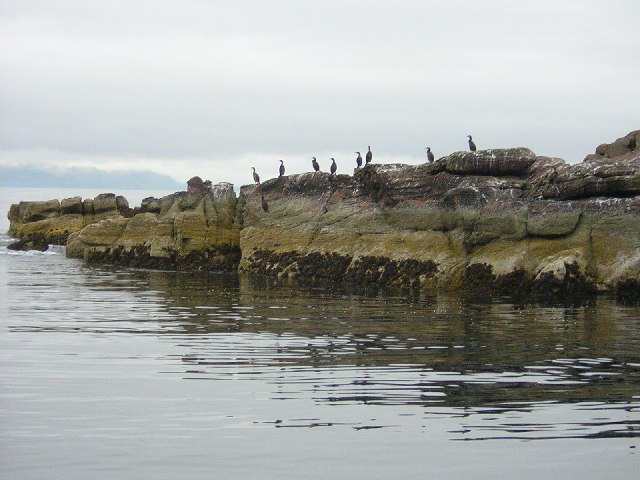
Shags on Sron na Caillich

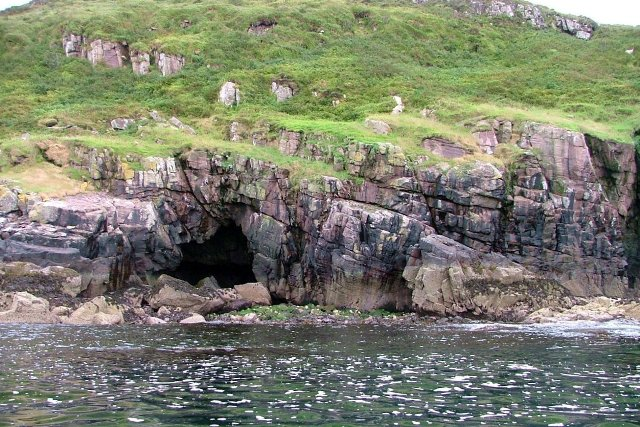
Unmapped Sea Cave Below An Raon

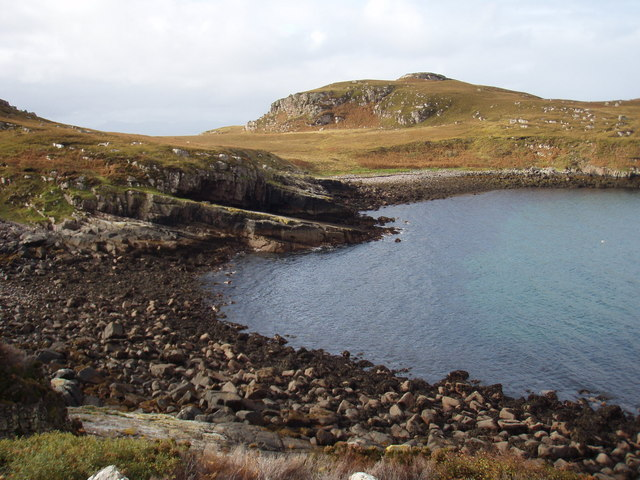
Camus na Rainich
