= Eilean Ighe =

Island in the Inner Hebrides, Scotland

Eilean Ighe (Gaelic)
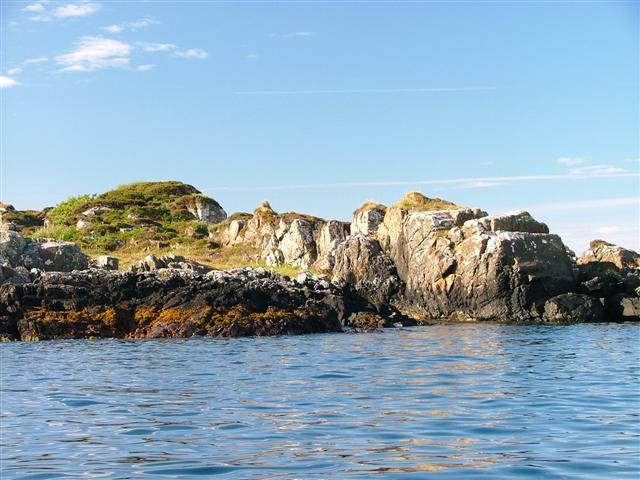

Location
- Eilean Ighe shown within Highland Scotland
- OS grid reference: NM633879
- Coordinates: 56.922°N 5.890°W

Physical geography
- Island group: Inner Hebrides
- Area: c. 35 ha
- Highest elevation: 20 metres (66 ft)

Administration
- Council area: Highland
- Country: Scotland
- Sovereign state: United Kingdom

Demographics
- Population: 0

Eilean Ighe is a small tidal island near Arisaig in the Inner Hebrides of Scotland.

The area is popular for sea kayaking and a challenge for larger boats.

Eilean Ighe is one of 43 tidal islands that can be walked to from the mainland of Great Britain and one of 17 that can be walked to from the Scottish mainland.
