= Eilean Ornsay =

Island in Argyll and Bute, Scotland

Eilean Ornsay (Gaelic)

Location
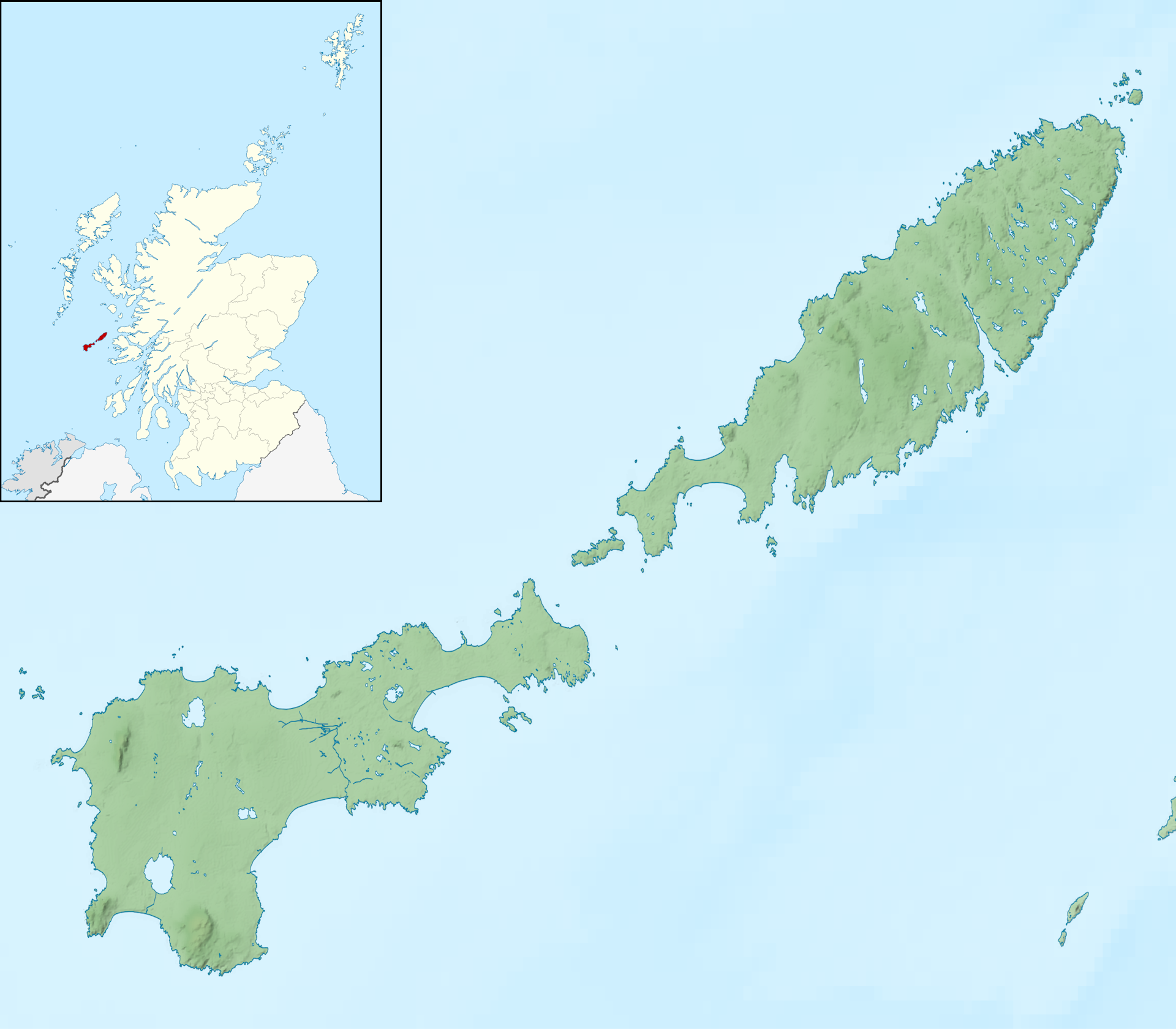
- Eilean Ornsay shown next to Coll and Tiree Eilean Ornsay shown within Argyll and Bute
- OS grid reference: NR161523
- Coordinates: 56.6°N 6.51°W

Name
- Name meaning: tidal island

Physical geography
- Island group: Mull
- Area: 14 ha (1/16 sq mi)
- Highest elevation: 10 m (33 ft)

Administration
- Council area: Argyll and Bute
- Country: Scotland
- Sovereign state: United Kingdom

Demographics
- Population: 0

Eilean Ornsay is a rocky and uninhabited island located off the south-western coast of the Inner Hebridean island of Coll. It is situated on the western side of Loch Eatharna and is joined to Coll at low tide. Evidence of the dun and other archaeological finds were recently discovered by a field walk on the east side of Coll.

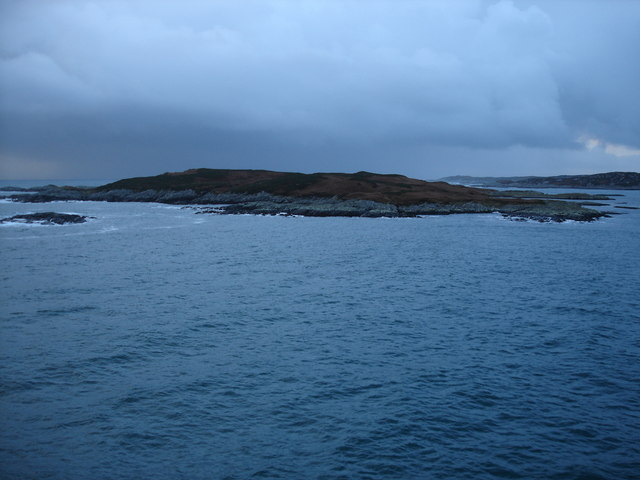
Eilean Ornsay, 2007

== Archaeology ==
Location of duns, hillforts, and crannogs, on Coll.

The island was recently visited by members of Coll Archaeology Association Shorewatch, resulting in the discovery of evidence of several archaeological sites which had previously been unrecorded. Evidence of a possible dun was found located at grid reference NM2260855491. Several examples of rock-cut basins were found: one located at grid reference NM2232951503; and three located at grid reference NM2238854899. A kelp kiln was found at grid reference NM2255855492; a shell mound was found at grid reference NM2234555423; a sheiling at grid reference NM2248353480; and an enclosure at grid reference NM2250353492.
