= Eilean Buidhe =

Bridged island in the Inner Hebrides of Scotland

Eilean Buidhe (Gaelic)
- The approach towards Craobh haven

Location
- Location within Argyll and Bute
- OS grid reference: NM796079
- Coordinates: 56.213°N 5.555°W

Name
- Name meaning: Yellow island

Physical geography
- Island group: Craobh Islands
- Area: 4 ha (0 sq mi)
- Highest elevation: 9 m (30 ft)

Administration
- Council area: Argyll and Bute
- Country: Scotland
- Sovereign state: United Kingdom

Demographics
- Population: 6
- Population rank: 76=
- Population density: 150/km^{2} (390/sq mi)

Eilean Buidhe is a bridged island that now forms part of the Craobh Haven marina in Argyll and Bute, Scotland. In 2022 the census recorded a permanent population on the island of six. It is the largest of the small islets than now form a breakwater which, along with Eilean Arsa to the southwest, are collectively known as the Craobh Islands.
