= Eilean Horrisdale =

Island in the Scottish Highlands

Eilean Thòiriosdal (Gaelic)

Location
- En Horrisdale shown within Highland Scotland
- OS grid reference: NG786744
- Coordinates: 57.705°N 5.717°W

Name
- Name meaning: Thor's Dale
- Old Norse name: Eilean Horrisdale

Physical geography
- Island group: Wester Ross
- Area: 32 ha (79 acres)
- Highest elevation: 38 m (125 ft)

Administration
- Council area: Highland
- Country: Scotland
- Sovereign state: United Kingdom

Demographics
- Population: 0

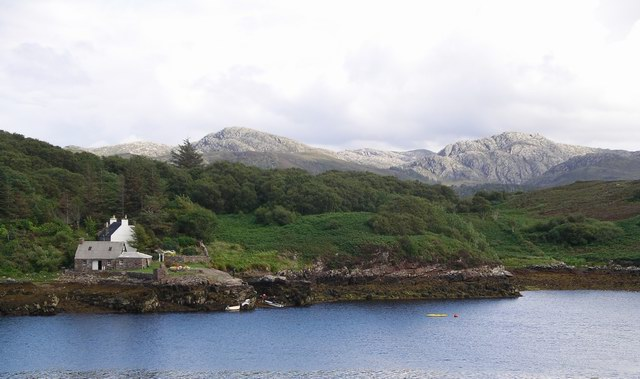

Eilean Horrisdale is an uninhabited island in Loch Gairloch in Wester Ross, Scotland.

== Geography ==
Eilean Horrisdale is the largest island in Loch Gairloch. In front is the smaller, Eilean Tioram (dry island), which is connected to the mainland by a causeway.

Eilean Horrisdale shelters the small harbour of Badachro. In 1841, it supported a fishing community of 27 people in four houses and 31 in five houses by the end of the 19th century. There were two curing stations – one on Eilean Horrisdale and one on Eilean Tioram. Today there are five houses on the island which are generally used as holiday homes. In 2011 the island was classified by the National Records of Scotland as an inhabited island that "had no usual residents at the time of either the 2001 or 2011 censuses."

A family by the name of BAIN lived here in the late 1800s. Kenneth Bain, master seaman, left Eilean Horrisdale and moved to Inverness about 1890 and then with a young family to South Australia about 1900. He then moved to Katanning WA Australia and named the homestead "Horrisdale". The street name of BAIN SQUARE in Forrestfield WA Australia is named after this Bain family. Enie Bain, son of Kenneth, authored the book "The Ways of Life". Duncan Bain, son of Kenneth, a 10th Lighthorseman, lost his life in WW1.

The name comes from Thor, the Norse god of thunder.
