= Cara Island =

Island located off the west coast of Kintyre in Scotland

Cara (Gaelic)

Location
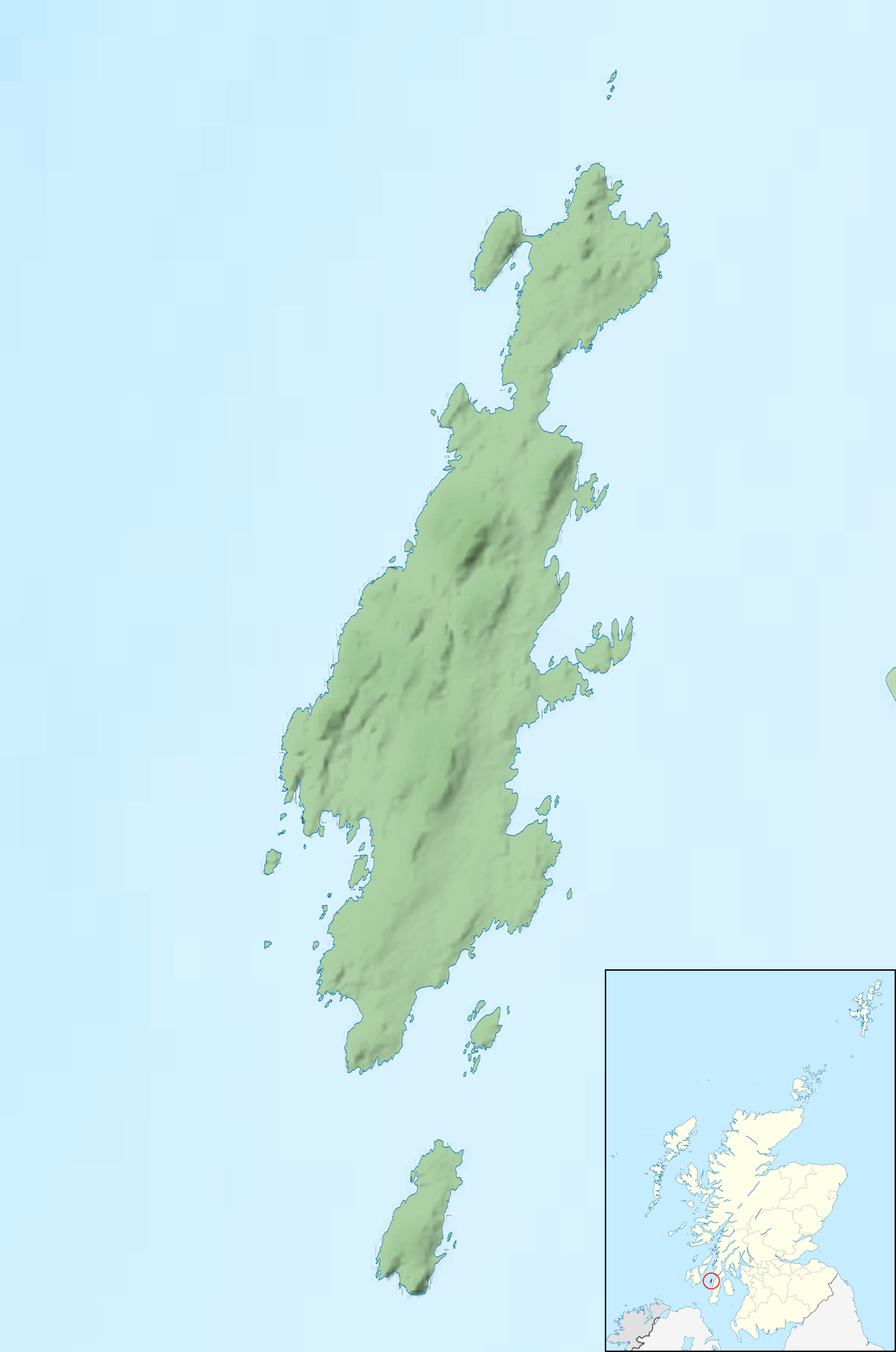
- Cara Island shown next to Gigha Cara Island within Argyll and Bute
- OS grid reference: NR639440
- Coordinates: 55.63°N 5.75°W

Name
- Gaelic pronunciation: [ˈkʰaɾə]
- Name meaning: may be "Kari's island" or "dearest"

Physical geography
- Island group: Islay
- Area: 66 ha (1/4 sq mi)
- Area rank: 178=
- Highest elevation: 56 m (184 ft)

Administration
- Council area: Argyll and Bute
- Country: Scotland
- Sovereign state: United Kingdom

Demographics
- Population: 0

Cara Island (Scottish Gaelic: Cara) is a small island which is located off the west coast of Kintyre in Scotland.

== Geography and etymology ==
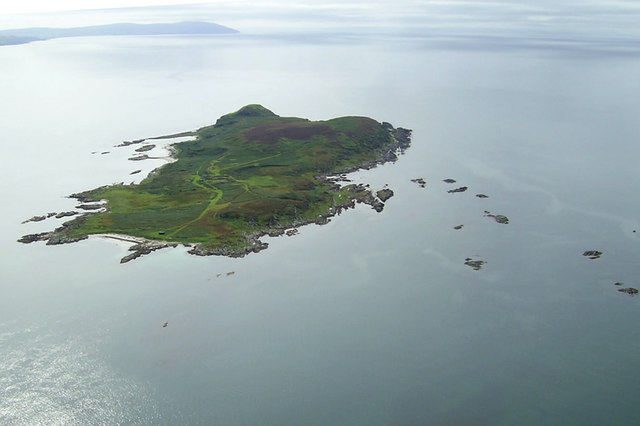
Cara from the air

Cara is one kilometre (one-half nautical mile) south of Gigha. It is accessible from Gigha.

Cara has a translation in Gaelic as "dearest" or "dear one". Cara is a popular girl's name in the local area and in Scotland in general.

== History ==
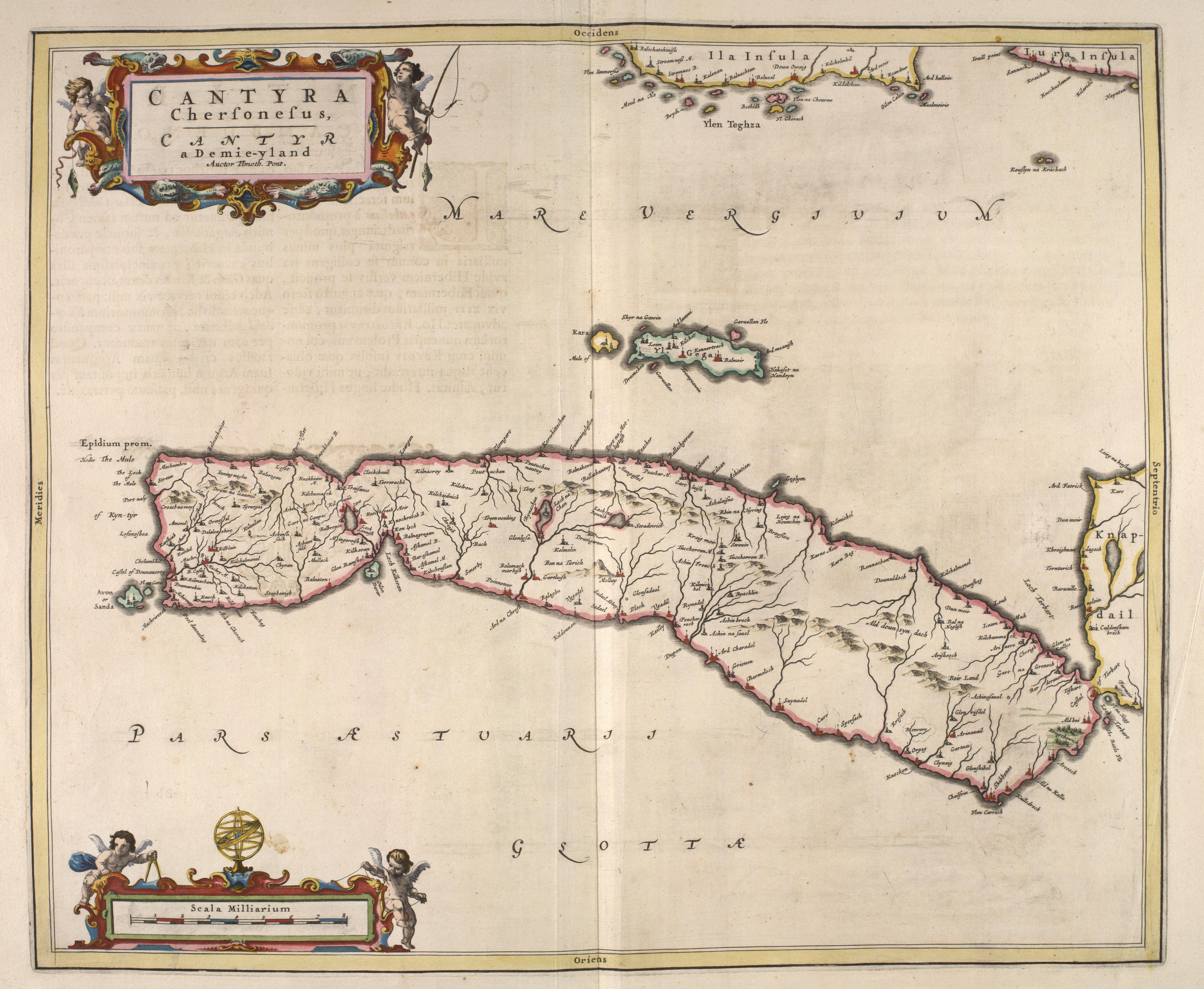
Joan Blaeu's 1654 Atlas of Scotland, with Gigha and Cara in the centre. The map is oriented with west at the top.

Cara Island is owned by the Macdonald family of Largie, Kintyre and is reputed to be the only island still in the possession of a direct descendant of the Lords of the Isles. The only habitable building on the island is Cara House.

The liner Aska was sunk on 22 September 1940 on rocks northwest of the island after being struck by German bombers.

== Wildlife ==
Cara is well known for a herd of feral goats, which still thrive on the wild landscape.

== Mythology ==
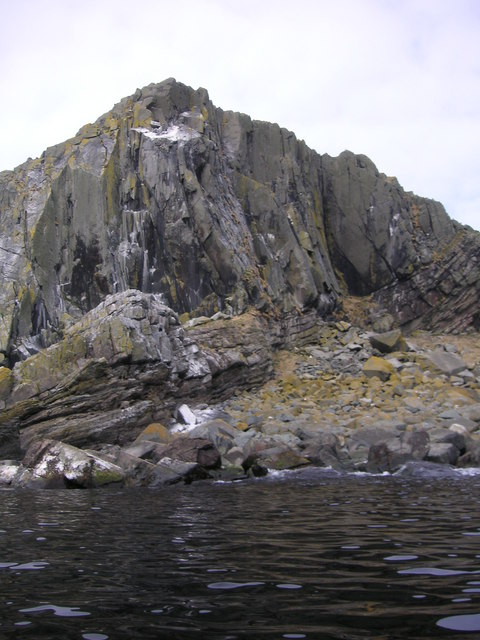
Mull of Cara, near Broonie's Chair

Cara is famous as the home of the Uruisg/broonie, the familiar spirit of the Macdonald of Largie family. A rock formation known as the Broonie's Chair is found at the extreme southern tip of the island. There is also a renowned cliff, Pilibín Mór, affectionately nicknamed by the locals as Hick's Lump.
