= Torsa =

One of the Slate Islands in Argyll and Bute, Scotland

Torsa (Gaelic)
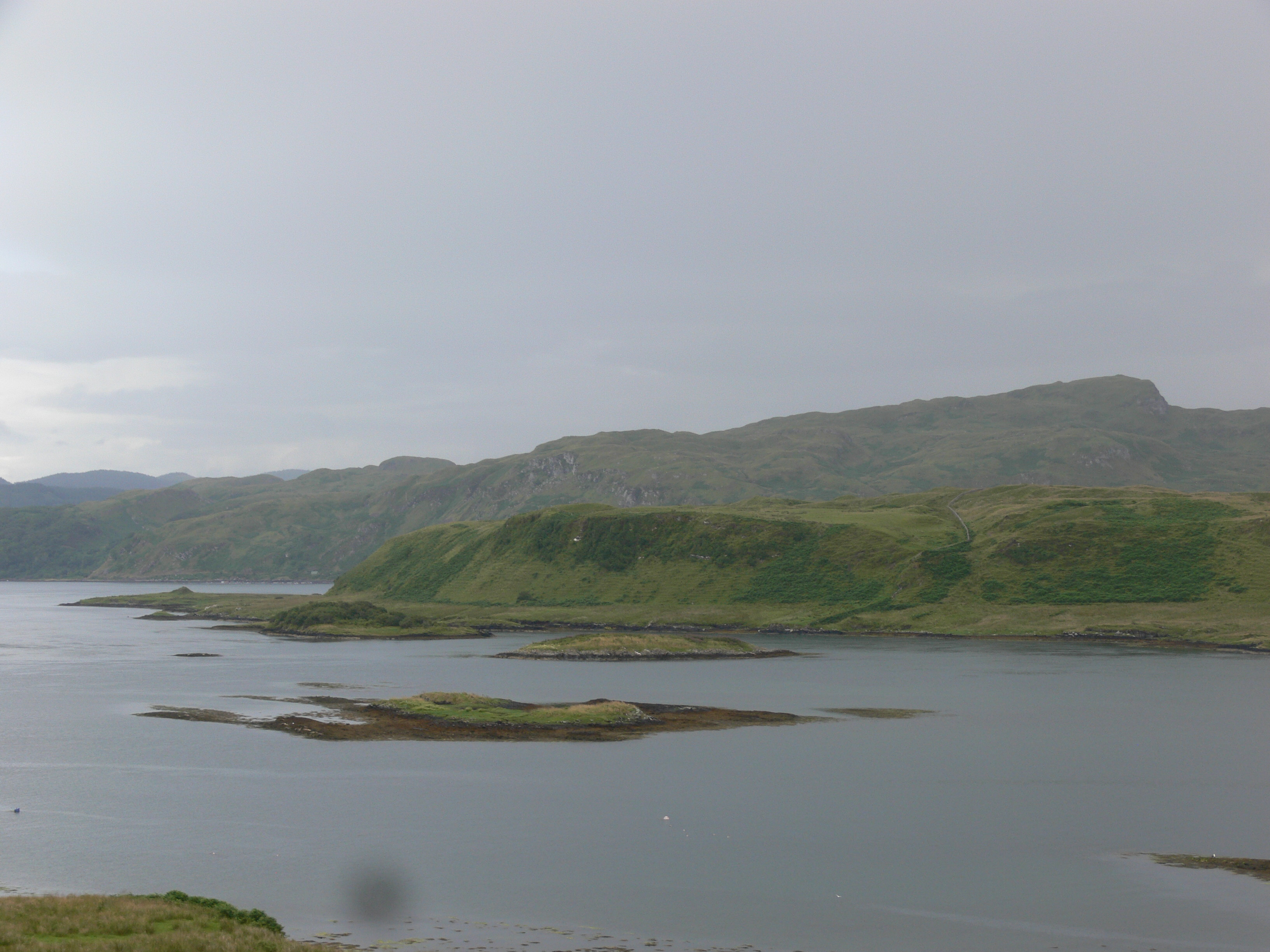
- The north of Torsa with visible raised beach line below the cliffs. Sgeir a' Bhodaich is at centre and Glas Eilean between there and Torsa. The heights of Dùn Crutagain on the mainland of Scotland are beyond.

Location
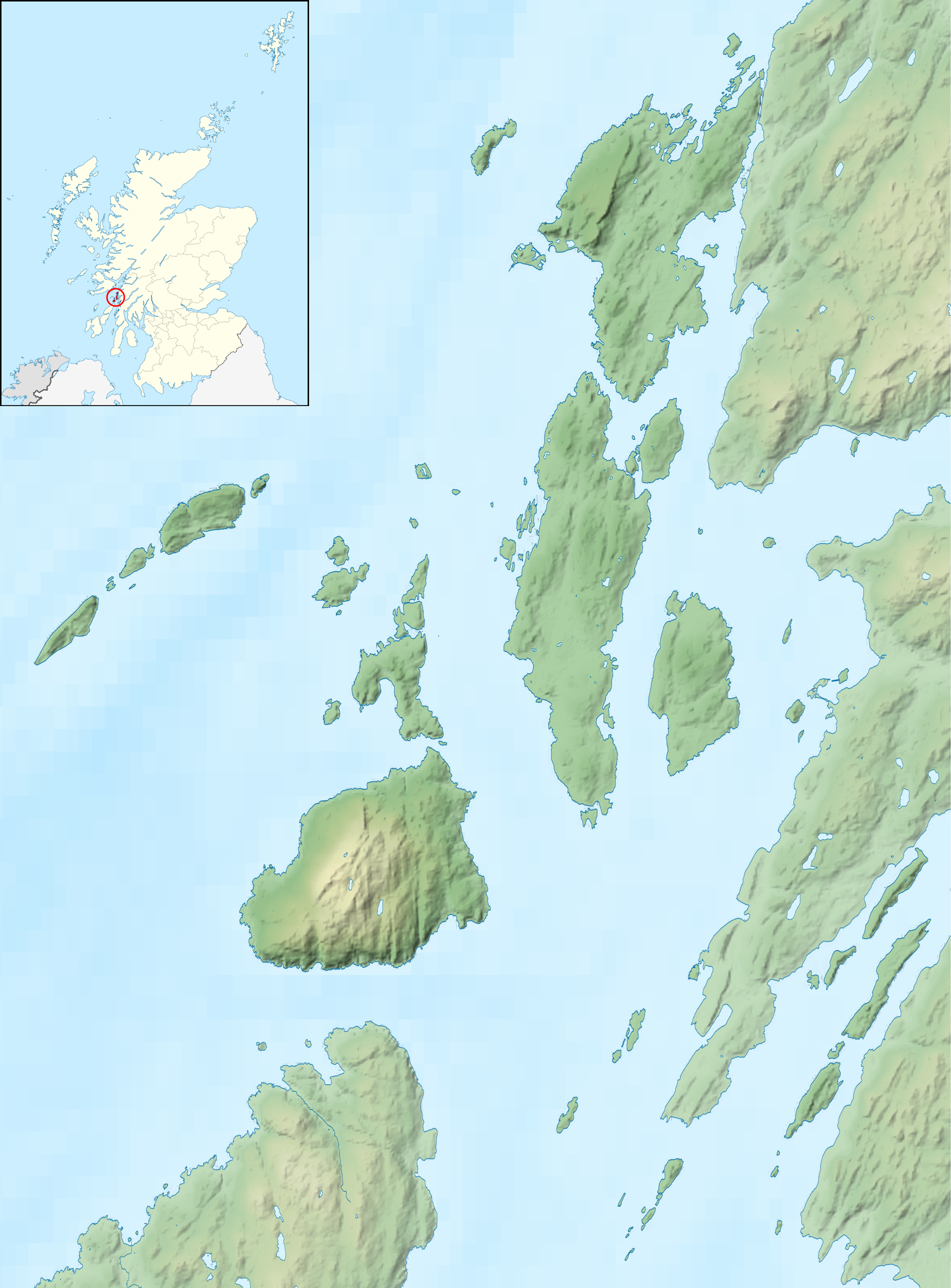
- Torsa shown within the Slate Islands, and next to the Garvellachs, Scarba, and the isles of Loch Craignish Torsa shown within Argyll and Bute
- OS grid reference: NM762130
- Coordinates: 56.26°N 5.62°W

Name
- Name meaning: Thorir's island
- Old Norse name: Possibly Þorirsey

Physical geography
- Island group: Slate Islands
- Area: 113 ha (280 acres)
- Area rank: 143
- Highest elevation: 62 m (203 ft)

Administration
- Council area: Argyll and Bute
- Country: Scotland
- Sovereign state: United Kingdom

Demographics
- Population: 0

Torsa (occasionally Torsay) is one of the Slate Islands in Argyll and Bute, Scotland. Lying east of Luing and south of Seil, this tidal island was inhabited until the 1960s. There is now only one house there, which is used for holiday lets. The underlying bedrock is slate but unlike Torsa's immediate island neighbours this has never been worked commercially. The island's name is of Norse origin but the most prominent historical structure on the island is the ruined Caisteal nan Con on the northeast shore, once held by Clan Campbell. The abundant sea life in the waters surrounding the island are protected by the Loch Sunart to the Sound of Jura Marine Protected Area.

== Geography ==
Torsa lies just offshore from the east coast of Luing. A rough track leads down from the road to Ardinamir farm on Luing to a narrow strait, fordable at low water, and onto the south west corner of the island. This area is known as Torsa Beag ("Little Torsa"), which name implies a small island in its own right but it is permanently attached to the main part of Torsa by a narrow strip of land.

Torsa farmhouse, which was inhabited until the 1960s and in 2007 was a holiday let, is nearby. The bulk of the island, the total area of which extends to 113 ha (280 acres), lies above a raised beach at between 10 and 60 metres above sea level. There is a shallow anchorage at Ardinamir reached via a narrow entrance with drying rocks. There is no jetty on the island and holidaymakers reach it using a small dinghy. The island is relatively fertile compared to its larger neighbours with good pasture for cattle and "almost its entire surface is capable of cultivation".

There are various small offshore islets on the west side of Torsa including Eilean Fraoch (heather island), Glas Eilean (grey-green island) and Sgeir a' Bhodaich (old man's skerry). The peninsula that forms the northern point of Torsa is called Eilean na h-Eaglaise – island of the church.

== Geology ==
Most of Torsa comprises the Easdale Slate formation, although it has never been extracted commercially. There are post-glacial marine deposits all around the raised beach that encircles the middle of the island. Torsa Beag has been formed from a Neoproterozoic metamorphic intrusion.

== Etymology ==
Torsa, archaically Torsay, is a Gaelic name derived from Old Norse. It means "Thorir's island" or possibly "Thor's Island". The names were common ones and there is an early reference to the Norse presence in the Irish records to a king of "Viking Scotland" whose heir Thórir brought an army to Ireland in 848. Just south of Ardinamir on Luing, overlooking Torsa, there is Bàgh Lachlainn – "Lachlan's Bay". The personal name Lachlan is derived from an 11th-century term Lochlann indicating a person of Norse origin. (Note: In the 9th century, the terms Laithlinn / Laithlind (etc.), appear in historical sources as terms denoting the origin of Vikings active in Ireland. The exact meaning behind these terms is uncertain. What is clear, however, is that the terms Lochlann / Lochlainn (etc.) came to replace these earlier terms; and that, by the 11th century, Lochlann / Lochlainn certainly referred to Norway in historical sources. Whether the terms Lochlann / Lochlainn were originally related to Laithlinn / Laithlind, or merely conflated with them, is unknown.)

== History ==
From about the 6th to the 8th century AD the Cenél Loairn kindred controlled what is today known as Lorn, which region includes the Slate Islands, in the then kingdom of Dalriada. By the late 8th century the area was a zone of conflict between the Celtic rulers of mainland Argyll and the newly arrived Norse settlers. Although there are few written references to the Slate Islands for this period the influence of the Norse language on placenames suggests that these islands then became part of the Kingdom of the Isles. Clan MacDougall were an important force in the area responsible for their mainland territories to the Scots crown, but to the Kings of Norway for their island territories until the 1266 Treaty of Perth when the Hebrides were yielded to the Kingdom of Scotland.

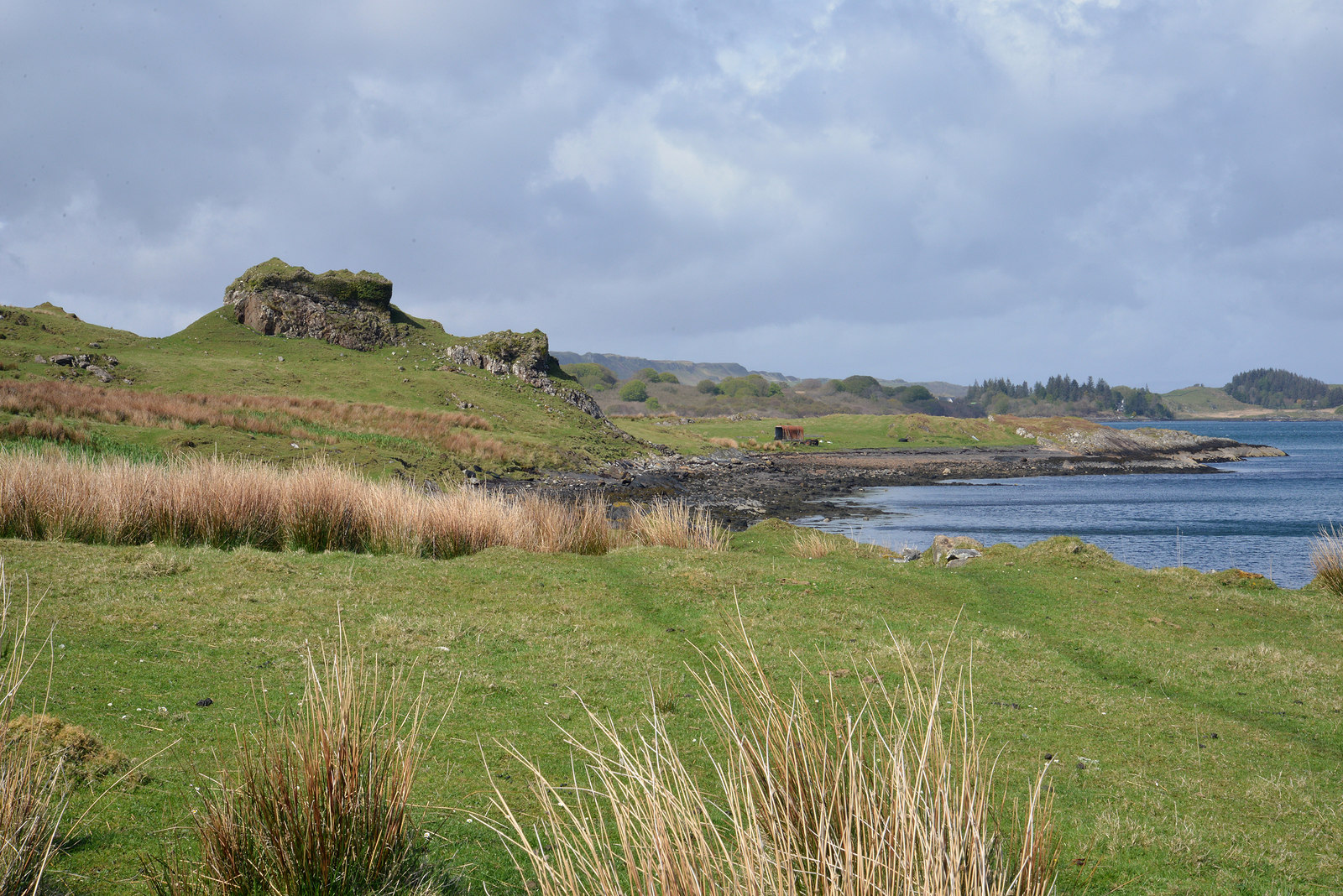
The ruins of Caisteal nan Con

Caisteal nan Con – the Dogs' Castle – is a ruined tower house that occupied a rocky eminence on the NE shore of the island. During the late Middle Ages it was held by Clan Campbell and then by the MacDougalls of Rarey at a later date, then finally Clan MacLean. It occupies a fine defensive position built on a sheer rocky outcrop overlooking the sea on three sides. The rock platform was enclosed by the oblong tower which measured about 13.7 metres by 8.8 metres and the lower, seaward portion by a bailey which included a small circular tower. In the 1970s RCAHMS reported that "all the buildings are very ruinous and much overgrown with turf, but considerable portions of the external wall faces of the tower-house and bailey survive." A small rocky inlet 75 metres north east of the ruins may have been used a boat landing. The name suggests it may have been used as a hunting lodge, although Torsa itself is too small to have provided much sport of this nature. It is more likely that this name is derived from a byname used of Clan MacLean by their enemies – Clann Illeathain nan Con, "Clan Lean of the Dogs".

By the late 17th century the Dukes of Argyll were the dominant landowners in the area and they began to lease land on a competitive basis rather than as the traditional means of strengthening the welfare of their senior clansmen. Neighbouring Seil, Luing and Shuna were subject to significant clearances of the indigenous population by Clan Campbell as early as 1699 and it is highly likely that Torsa suffered the same fate. (Note: According to Richards (2012) "there was an early mass eviction of tenants from the islands of Shuna, Luing, Torosay and Seil". A very similar statement is made in an earlier publication by Duncan. However, although there is a parish of Torosay on Mull this is MacLean territory and there is no Scottish island called "Torosay". It therefore seems likely that the statement should refer to Shuna, Luing, Torsa and Seil.) The Slate Islands then became part of the Netherlorn estates of the Breadalbane family, a branch of Clan Campbell, whose affairs were directed from Ardmaddy Castle on the mainland.

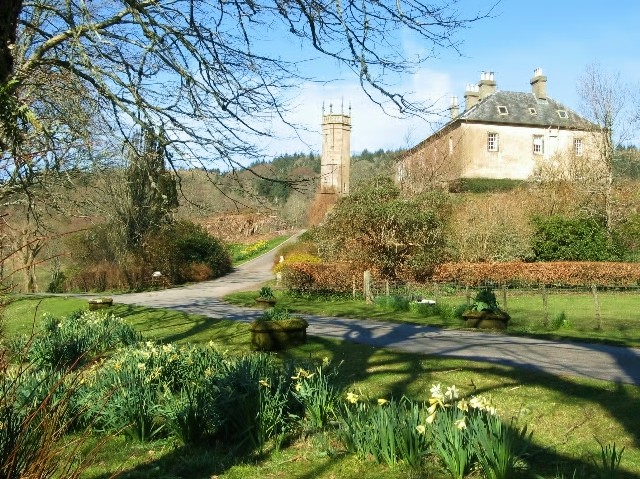
Ardmaddy Castle on mainland Scotland, seat of the government of Nether Lorn under the Breadalbane family

In 1928 a stone spindle whorl of unknown date was found on the central plateau of the island. At the beginning of the 19th century there were eleven families living on the island who made use of the traditional run rig system of cultivation. In the mid-19th century the population was recorded as 9, 5 females and 4 males and by 1909 the island had a single farm. The 1961 census was the last record of any permanent inhabitation with a single resident living there at that time.

During the 20th century most of the Breadalbane land on the Slate Islands was sold off as smaller farms and individual houses.

In 2024, a UK-based Muslim cleric, Yasser Al-Habib, attempted to buy the island to establish a Sharia-based state but was refused by the owner. Al-Habib had raised £3 million from followers for the purchase, intending to build a school, hospital, and mosque. In response, Calvin Robinson, a Christian political commentator and priest, launched a fundraising campaign to buy the island for a Christian monastery and retreat; he raised over £160,000 but did not purchase the island.

== Wildlife ==
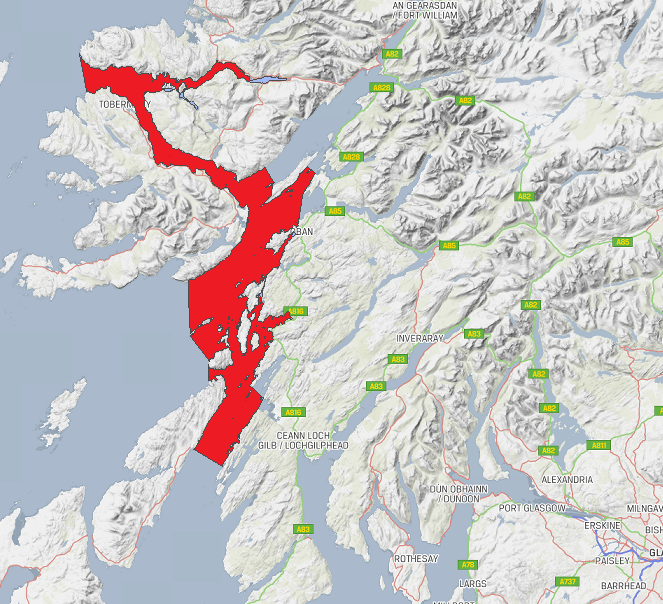
Map of Loch Sunart to the Sound of Jura Marine Protected Area

Red deer, roe deer and foxes can be found on the island and otters and seals can sometimes be seen along the shoreline. Various boat trips operate locally offering visitors the opportunity to see cetaceans and basking sharks. The island lies near the eastern edge of the Firth of Lorn Marine Special Area of Conservation and the waters surrounding all the Slate Islands are part of the Loch Sunart to the Sound of Jura Marine Protected Area.

== See also ==
- Luing cattle
- Scandinavian Scotland
