= Belnahua =

Beul na h-Uamha (Gaelic)
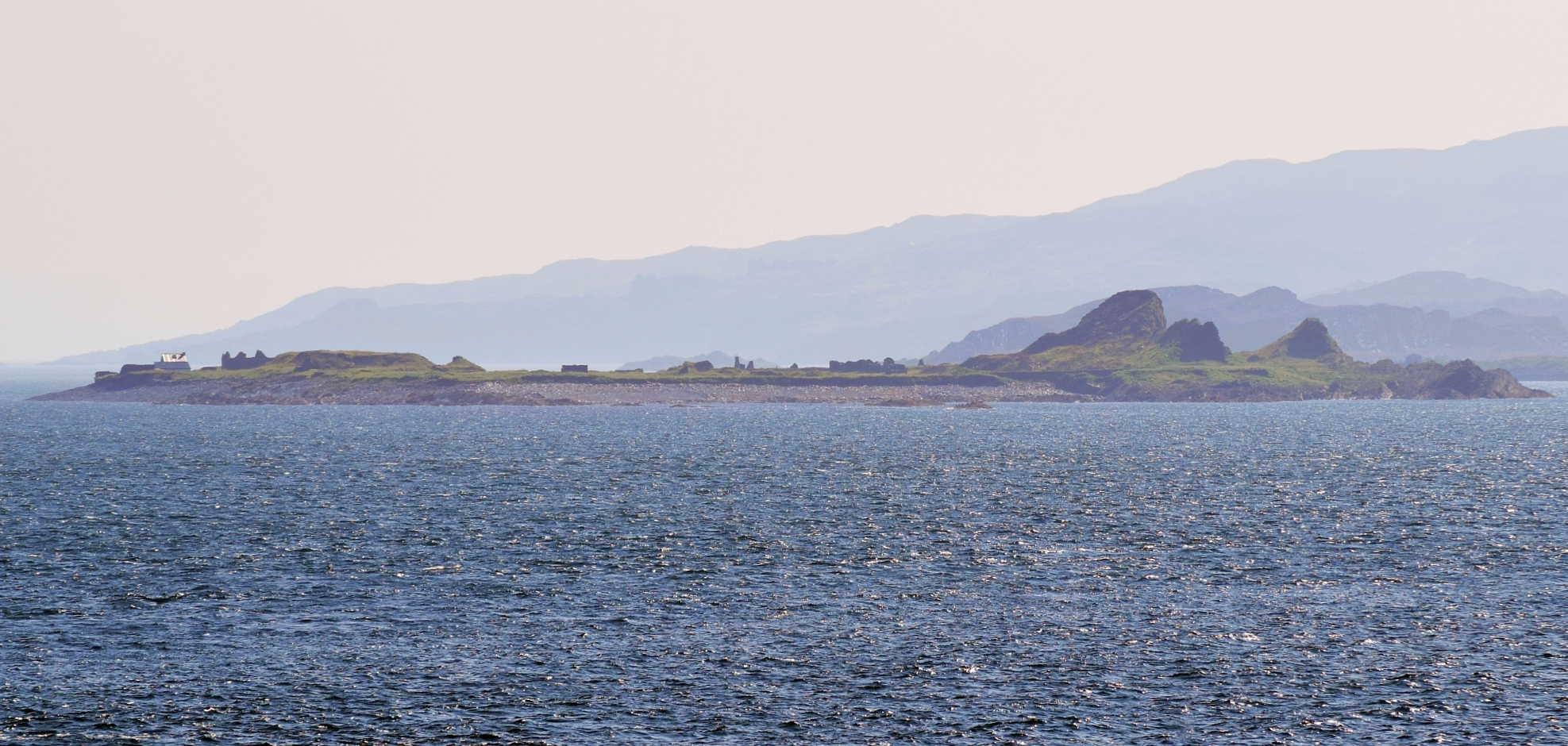
- Belnahua from the east

Location
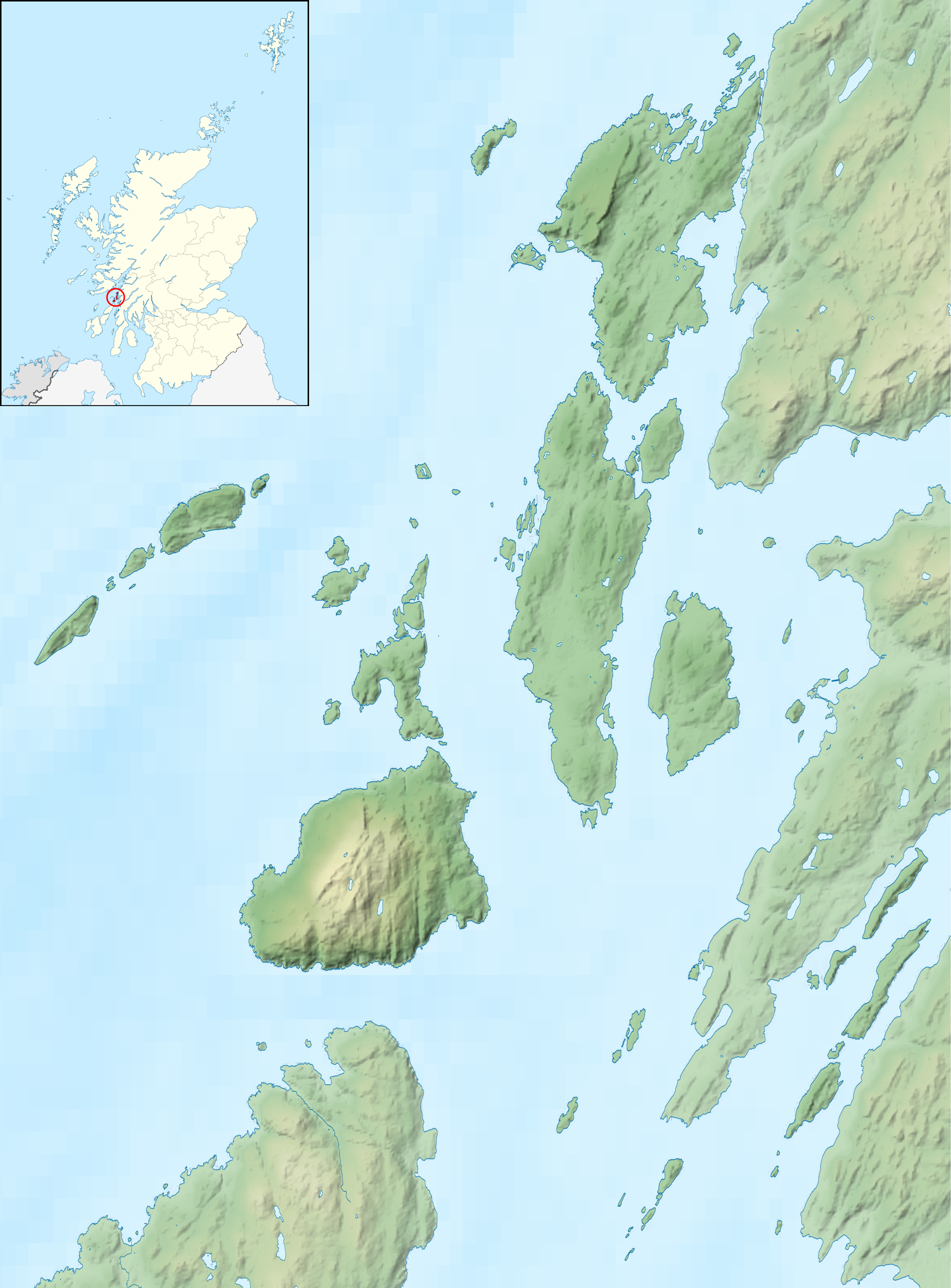
- Belnahua shown within the Slate Islands, and next to the Garvellachs, Scarba, and the isles of Loch Craignish Belnahua shown within Argyll and Bute
- OS grid reference: NM713127
- Coordinates: 56.25°N 5.69°W

Name
- Name meaning: The mouth of the cave

Physical geography
- Island group: Slate Islands
- Highest elevation: 22 m (72 ft)

Administration
- Council area: Argyll and Bute
- Country: Scotland
- Sovereign state: United Kingdom

Demographics
- Population: 0

Belnahua is one of the Slate Islands, in the Firth of Lorn in Scotland, known for its deserted slate quarries. The bedrock that underpins its human history is part of the Scarba Conglomerate Formation and its value has been on record since the 16th century. Likely uninhabited before commercial quarrying commenced, under the control of the Stevenson family during the 19th century the population expanded to over 150 before the island was abandoned again in 1914.

Living on a remote island in the 19th century came with significant hardships and the lives of the quarry workers have been described in unflattering terms by modern commentators, one describing them as in effect "slaves". Today, the ruined buildings and abandoned machinery lie amidst the water filled quarries and are home only to wildlife. There are very strong tidal streams in the area and this a potentially hazardous location for shipping. In 1936 the cargo vessel Helēna Faulbaums was wrecked on the island, with the loss of 15 lives.

== Geography ==
Belnahua is in the council area of Argyll and Bute and lies two kilometres (1 1/4 miles) west of Luing and three kilometres (two miles) east of Dùn Chonnuill in the Garvellachs. The island is roughly 6 hectares (15 acres) in extent. About 500 metres (550 yards) southeast is the islet of Fladda, the lighthouse on which is a "well-known sea-mark in the Sound of Luing".

The island has been considerably denuded by quarrying – a process sometimes described as having broken its back. Deep water-filled cuttings and the ruined slate workers cottages remain as a testament to this industry. There was a jetty to the east of the island, but it was worn away within the last quarter of the twentieth century.

Belnahua exists amongst sea lanes that have numerous islands and skerries that "swarm like bees on a branch" amongst the "most treacherous seas and complicated channels of the west coast" of Scotland, including the Gulf of Corryvreckan some ten kilometres (six miles) to the south. The island is part of the Scarba, Lunga and the Garvellachs National Scenic Area.

== Geology ==
The bedrock of Belnahua is in large part a Neoproterozoic age slate, graphitic pelite referred to the Jura Slate Member of the Scarba Conglomerate Formation. The Jura Slates are also found along the east coasts of Scarba and of Jura to the south. Like the Easdale Slates found across the Sound of Luing these slates belong to the Easdale Subgroup of the Dalradian Argyll Group. Three NNW-SSE aligned tracts of metalimestone, assigned to the Ardrishaig Phyllite Formation, are identified in the southern half of Belnahua. A doleritic igneous dyke cuts through the centre of the island and is identified as part of the Mull Dyke Swarm of early Palaeogene age, associated with the central volcanic complex which developed in Mull. In common with other shoreline zones in the region, the relatively flat surface of the island is as a result of marine planation when relative sea levels were higher, the steep sides of the knoll in the west having formed as sea cliffs.

== History ==
=== Early times ===
In the 7th century the Cenél Loairn kindred controlled what is today known as Lorn in the kingdom of Dalriada. From about the mid-9th century Belnahua would then have become part of the Norse Kingdom of the Isles. The first written reference to the island appears in the 1549 Description of the Western Isles of Scotland by Donald Monro. He wrote of "Belnachua" or "Belnachna"; "Narrest the Wolfiis iyle layes ane iyllane, callit in Erische Leid-Ellan-Belnachna, quharin ther is fair skailzie aneuche". In modern English this brief entry reads as "Nearest the Wolf's Iyle lies an island called in the Scottish Gaelic language "Ellan-Belnachna", where there is good sufficiency of slate". Not all of the islands that Monro mentions have been identified and the location of "Wolf's Iyle" or "Ellan Madie" is uncertain. (Note: R. W. Munro offers no suggestion for this island's identity. A derivation of Ulva is from the Old Norse ulvøy meaning "wolf island". The tidal Ulva Islands in Loch Sween at NR727824 are thus a possibility for "the Wolfiis iyle" although they are by no means "nearest" to Belnahua.)

=== Slate quarrying ===
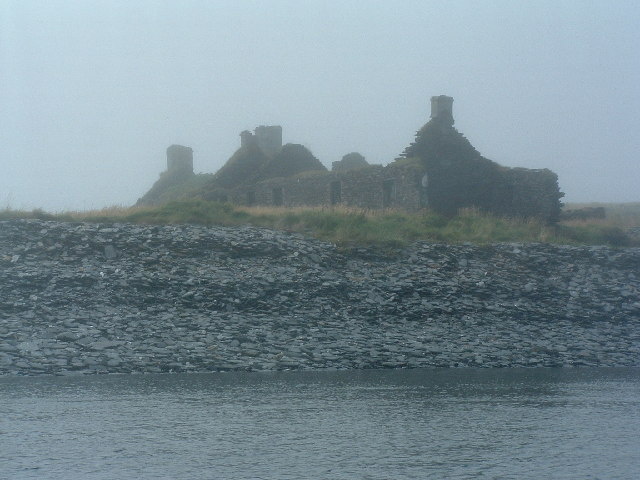
Ruined cottages on Belnahua

According to the Old Statistical Account, quarrying began on Belnahua in 1632. The island was probably uninhabited prior to that. (Note: Withall states that Belnahua was "probably uninhabited" prior to the formation of the Easdale Marble and Slate Company in 1730, but Pallister quotes the significantly earlier date of 1632.) By this time the island may have become part of the Netherlorn estates of the Breadalbane family (a branch of Clan Campbell). In 1730 Colin Campbell of Carwhin was appointed to oversee their estates in Netherlorn and was tasked with exploiting the area's natural resources. Easdale slate had been used from as early as the 12th century using seasonal labour from the Ardmaddy estate. In 1745 Campbell created the Easdale Marble and Slate Company (later shortened to Easdale Slate Company) in order to place extractions from the area on a more commercial basis. At that point Easdale was producing 1 million slates per annum and as further quarries were opened this further increased the company's production to 5 million per annum by 1800.

In the 1790s Belnahua was leased out by the landowners to the Stevenson brothers whose aim was to supply slate for the developing town of Oban. (Note: Pallister states that as Belnahua was part of the parish of Jura rather than Kilbrandon and Kilchattan that it never became part of the Breadalbane estates and implies that the Stevensons had set up an independent commercial "empire".) Cottages were constructed for the workers in the south east corner of the island and there was a school and company store. Virtually all the provisions had to be supplied from Luing, including drinking water. Rainwater was collected in reservoirs but it was used to power the steam engines that drove the quarries' pumps. By the early 19th century the Stevenson family were shipping slate from both Belnahua and Fladda to Campbeltown in Kintyre. Their lease was eventually passed on to the Shaw family of Luing who hired a quarry master that lived on a 2-storey house on the island. At the height of the activity there were 30 quarry workers and their families living there and a total population of over 150. With the commencement of World War I in 1914 quarry work ceased and the island was completely abandoned and it has been uninhabited ever since.

The Breadalbane estates were sold off in the 1930s and as of 2004 Belnahua was owned by the Carling family.

=== Life on the island ===
Living on a remote island in the 19th century came with hardships. Quarry workers sought employment from around Scotland, some arriving in an area where they would have had few friends or family to support them in times of difficulty. There is no protection from the wind and it can be a "harsh and desolate" location, especially in winter. One writer has gone so far as to suggest that although some islands can suggest a lifestyle of peace and tranquility, that Belnahua "buffeted by the sea and the winds, overshadowed from the south by the lowering cliffs of Scarba, and dominated by the threatening deep maws of the slate quarries at its heart, could surely have engendered little more than tension, fear, agitation and anxiety."

Paul Murton took a similar view of the islanders' circumstances: "They were paid poorly and forced to rent their homes and buy all their supplies from their feudal superior, the Campbell Marquis of Breadalbane, who kept the workforce in a state of permanent debt and poverty. Effectively, the people of Belnahua were slaves."

== Shipwrecks ==
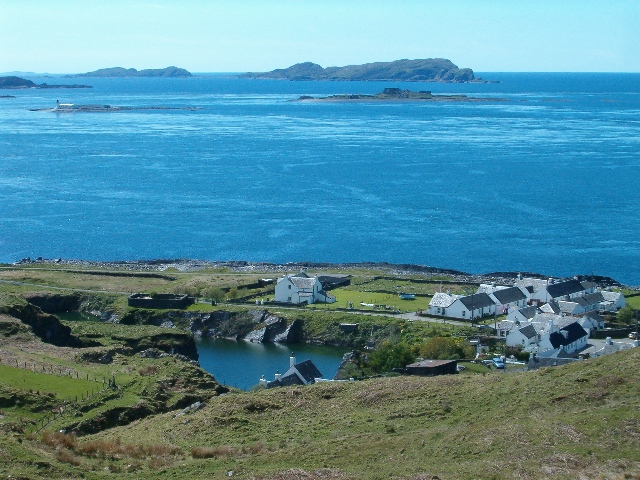
Belnahua and Fladda from Cullipool on Luing with the Garvellachs in the distance.

On 15 August 1900 the 310-tonne (340-short-ton) iron steamship Apollo ran aground on Bono Reef two kilometres (1 1/4 mi) north of Belnahua. She was carrying a cargo of granite cobble stones from Aberdeen to Newport. The wreck lies in a gully some 10 metres (35 ft) down amidst thick kelp.

The 1,770-tonne (1,950-short-ton) unladen Latvian vessel Helēna Faulbaums left the Mersey on 26 October 1936 en route for Blyth. Encountering a storm, she headed for the Firth of Lorn seeking shelter although the light load meant that the propeller was ineffective in the high seas. At 7 p.m. her steering failed and captain ordered the anchors to be deployed but they could not hold in the deep waters. The radio operator sent out SOS messages but the storm had disrupted communications and the local coastguards could not make contact with the lifeboat station at Port Askaig. The lifeboat was finally launched when a message was broadcast by the BBC. There is an extensive drying reef to the north of Belnahua and at 10 p.m. that night the Helēna Faulbaums struck it broadside and foundered, sinking within ten minutes with the loss of 15 lives including two 18-year-old boys. (Note: Haswell-Smith has the loss of life at 16.) Four sailors managed to scramble ashore and were rescued the next day by the Islay lifeboat and taken to Crinan. The bodies of the other crew members were washed ashore on Luing. Seven of the perished were later buried in a widely attended ceremony in Cullipool cemetery on Luing, but the captain of the ship Nikolajs Cughauss was repatriated to Latvia by the wish of his brother. A small monument has also been built at the gravesite. (Note: See Talk:Belnahua#Latvian sources and the Helēna Faulbaums for a translation of this article from Brīvā Zeme into English.)

The wreck lies in 60 metres (195 ft) of water. There are very strong tidal streams in the area and diving is only possible at slack water.

== Wildlife ==
Otters and seals are regular visitors to the coast of Belnahua, the latter fishing for ling, saithe and cod which get trapped in the sea-flooded quarries at low tide. The only land mammal on the island is the field vole.

The soils are very poor in quality so horticultural options are "limited or non-existent" and the ruined buildings and abandoned machinery lie amidst "waist high grasses". The aim of the Slate Islands Heritage Trust is to record the island's history but otherwise leave it untouched.
