= Island Macaskin =

Island in Loch Craignish, Argyll and Bute, Scotland

Eilean MhicAsgain (Gaelic)

Location
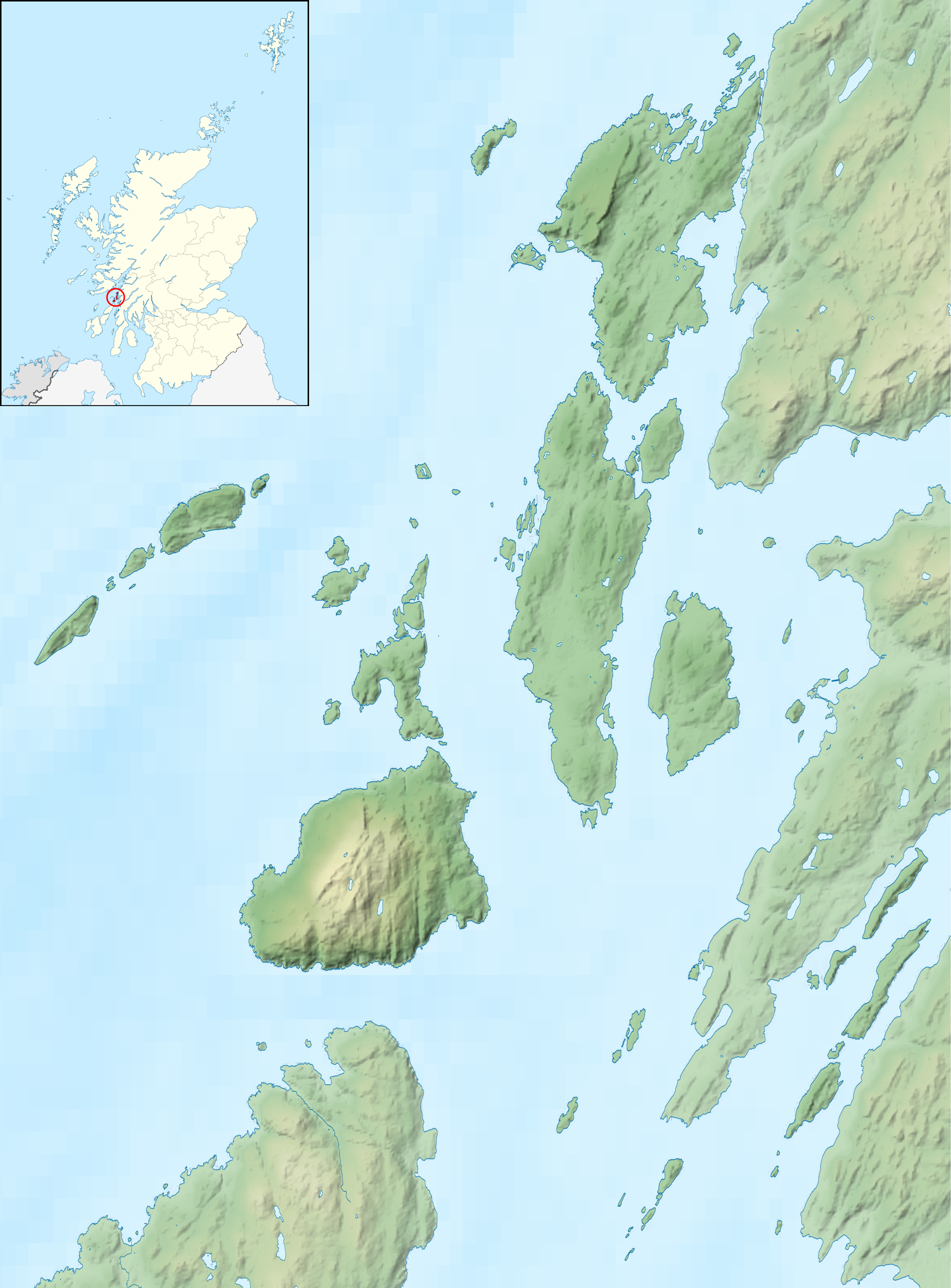
- Island Macaskin shown within Loch Craignish, and next to the Slate Islands, the Garvellachs, and Scarba Island Macaskin shown within Argyll and Bute
- OS grid reference: NR786994
- Coordinates: 56.14°N 5.56°W

Physical geography
- Island group: Islay
- Area: 50 hectares (0.19 sq mi)
- Area rank: 199=
- Highest elevation: 65 m (213 ft)

Administration
- Council area: Argyll and Bute
- Country: Scotland
- Sovereign state: United Kingdom

Demographics
- Largest settlement: Main hut

Island Macaskin or MacAskin (Scottish Gaelic: Eilean MhicAsgain) is an island in Loch Craignish, in the Inner Hebrides of Scotland. It is owned by the Jenkin family and has been since 1904.

== History and wildlife ==
The island was formerly inhabited, and unusually for the Scottish islands, is quite well wooded, with some mature trees scattered about. It appears to have been abandoned in the 1880s, but there is ample evidence of human habitation on it, including a number of walls, a sheep pen, and a lime kiln.

A number of wild flowers grow here, though not as many as on nearby Eilean Rìgh.

== Geography and geology ==
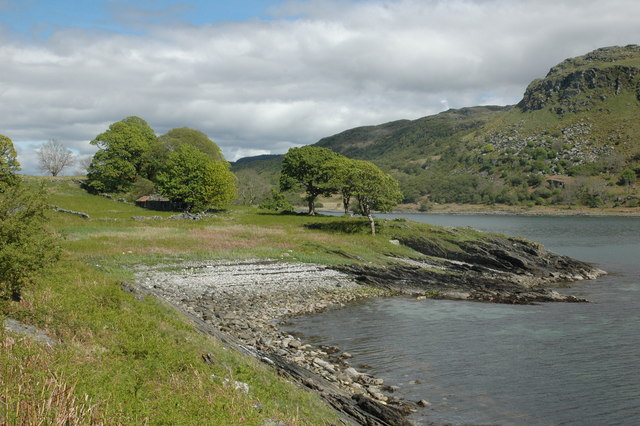
The east coast of Island Macaskin

The island is long and narrow, aligned southwest–northeast, parallel to the nearby shore of the mainland. It is basically a ridge, with the west being higher than the east. The western side is dominated by the steep sides to the islands central ridge that reaches a height of 65 metres (213 ft). A line of skerries extend from the south of the island into the Sound of Jura.

The geology is metamorphic apidiorite with some Dalriadan quartzite at the south end.

It is surrounded by various smaller islands including Eilean nan Gabhar, Eilean nan Coinean, Garbh Rèisa, Rèisa an t-Sruith, Rèisa MhicPhàidein and Eilean na Cille.
