= Fladda, Slate Islands =

Island of the Slate Islands, Argyll and Bute, Scotland

Fladda
Location
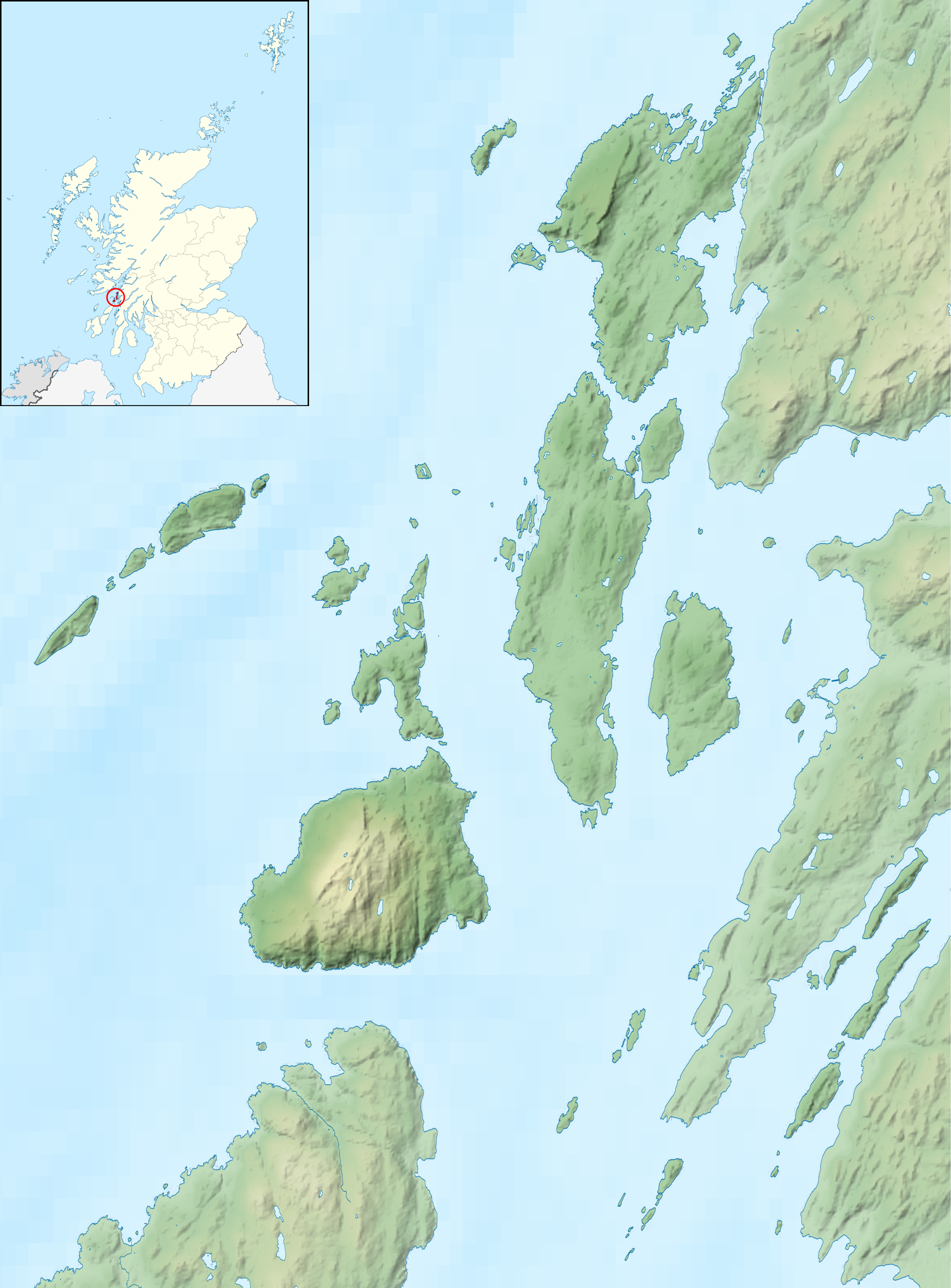
- Fladda shown within the Slate Islands, and next to the Garvellachs, Scarba, and the isles of Loch Craignish Fladda shown within Argyll and Bute
- OS grid reference: NM720123
- Coordinates: 56.25°N 5.675°W

Name
- Name meaning: "flat island"

Physical geography
- Island group: Slate Islands
- Area: ha
- Highest elevation: m

Administration
- Council area: Argyll and Bute
- Country: Scotland
- Sovereign state: United Kingdom

Demographics
- Population: 0
- Fladda Lighthouse
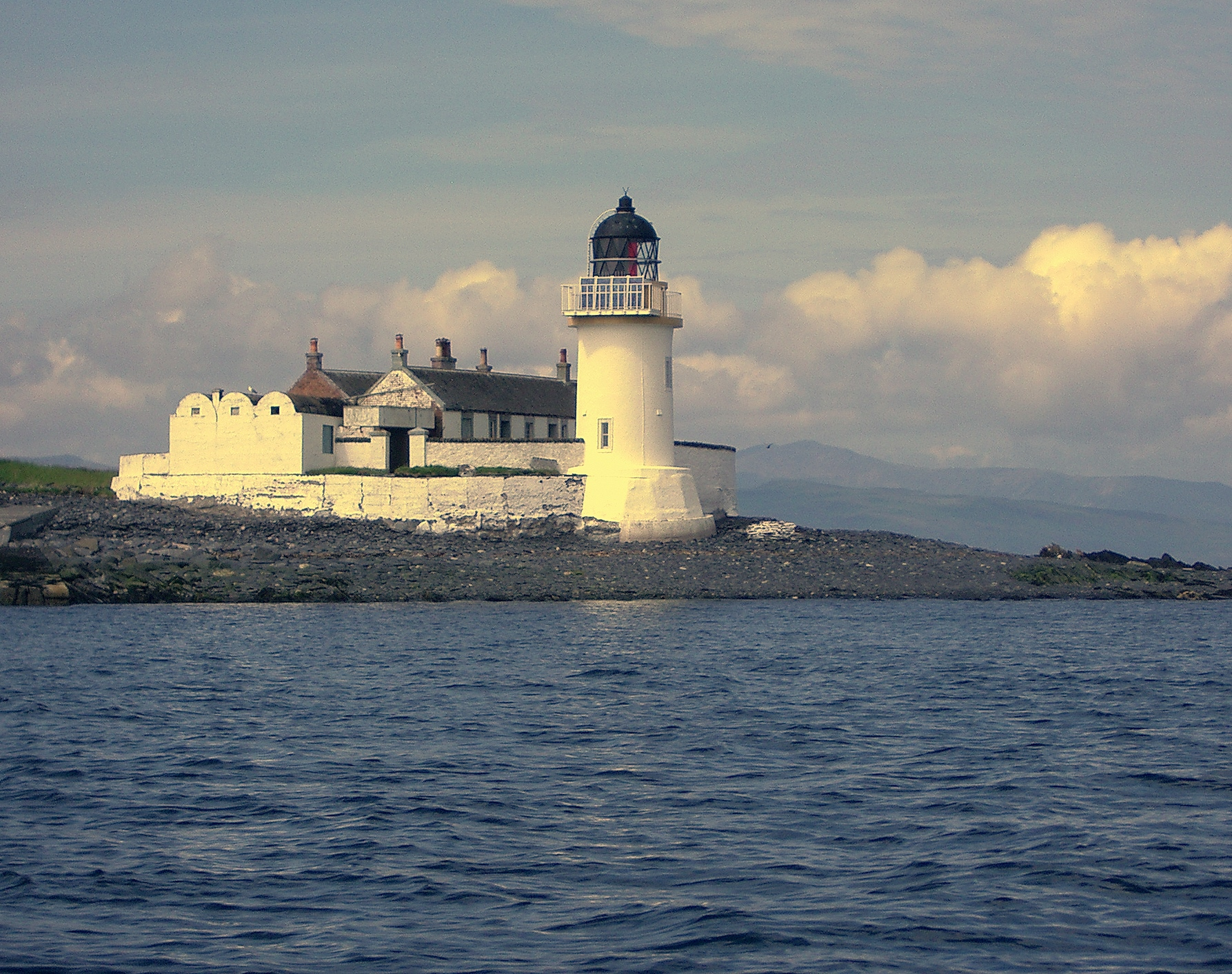
- Fladda Lighthouse in 2005
- Coordinates: 56.248316°N 5.680506°W
- Constructed: 1860
- Construction: masonry tower
- Height: 13 metres (43 ft)
- Shape: cylindrical tower with balcony and lantern
- Markings: white tower, black lantern, ochre trim
- Operator: private
- Heritage: category B listed building
- Focal height: 13 metres (43 ft)
- Characteristic: Fl (2) W 9s.

Fladda is one of the Slate Islands, off the west coast of Argyll and Bute, Scotland.

Fladda is an islet in the Sound of Luing, between Luing and Belnahua. The name Fladda originates from the Old Norse for 'flat island'.

== Lighthouse ==
Fladda lighthouse is an active lighthouse located on the Islet of Fladda, one of the Slate Islands about 1.8 kilometres (1.1 mi) off Cullippol. The lighthouse was built in 1860 on project by David A. and Thomas Stevenson; it is a cylindrical masonry tower 13 metres (43 ft) high with gallery and lantern. The tower is painted white, the lantern is black and has ochre trim; it is a minor light operated by Northern Lighthouse Board but managed privately. The light emits a two white flashes every 9 seconds. The keeper's house seems to be home to a large colony of terns.

== See also ==
- List of lighthouses in Scotland
- List of Northern Lighthouse Board lighthouses
