= Insh Island =

Island in Argyll and Bute, Scotland

Innis (Gaelic)
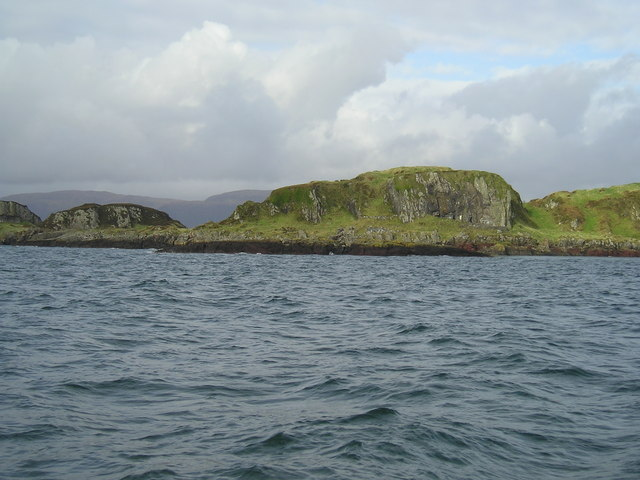

Location
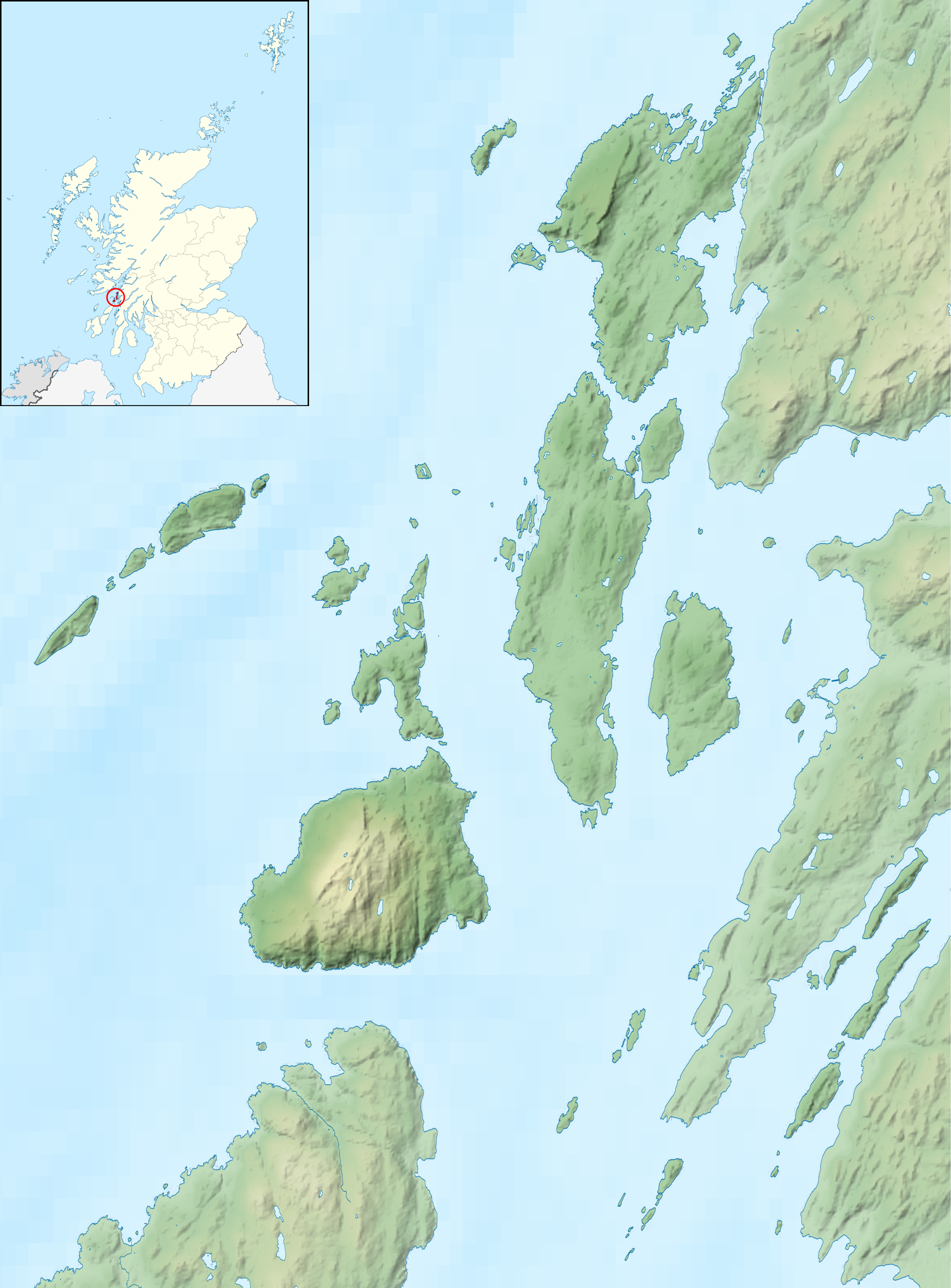
- Insh Island shown within the Slate Islands, and next to the Garvellachs, Scarba, and the isles of Loch Craignish Insh Island shown within Argyll and Bute
- OS grid reference: NM729192
- Coordinates: 56.311109°N 5.672493°W

Name
- Name meaning: island

Physical geography
- Island group: Slate Islands
- Area: 33 ha (82 acres)
- Highest elevation: 69 m (226 ft)

Administration
- Council area: Argyll and Bute
- Country: Scotland
- Sovereign state: United Kingdom

Demographics
- Population: 0

Insh Island (Scottish Gaelic: An Innis) or simply Insh is an uninhabited island west of the island of Seil in the Firth of Lorn, Scotland.

One of the Slate Islands, Insh Island lies a mile (1.5 km) northeast of Ellenabeich in Seil. It is separated from it by the Sound of Insh. The island rises to 69 metres (226 feet) and is 36 hectares (89 acres) in area. A previous owner, David Brearley lived in a cave at the north end of the island between 1973 and 2003. It was "Eilean nan Caorach" on the 1875 Ordnance Survey (OS) maps, which was thought to have been an error, with its correct name being "Inis-Capul". It is now on OS maps as "Insh Island". Insh was previously known as Sheep Island.

The name is tautologous. The Gaelic An Innis means simply "The Island" and the derived English language name thus means "The Island Island."

The 49.3 m (162 ft) long wooden sailing ship Norval ran aground in fog near the southern tip of Insh on 20 September 1870. The wreckage was still visible in 1995.

The Northern sea fan (Swiftia pallida) is found in the waters off Insh Island.

== Ownership ==
In 2004 Haswell-Smith stated that the island is "reputed to be owned by a Londoner who occasionally occupies the cave" found in the northwest overlooking Seil. The owner at that time was David Brearley, who died in 2016 and left the island to the National Trust for Scotland. In 2020 the Trust came in for criticism for selling the island for £353,000 to West Coast Heritage Limited. Mike Russell MSP joined those who believed that the former owner wanted Insh to “stay untouched as nature intended” and Scottish Green Party MSP John Finnie called it “disappointing that yet another part of the Highlands and Islands... will find itself in private ownership and in questionable use”.

A spokesperson for the new owners stated that the plan for the island was to "harvest seaweed, and make the island generally accessible in terms of rough pathways and [provide a] safe facility for boats to dock” but noted that "these plans have been shelved for the time being.” They added: “the island is extremely difficult to land on and therefore, we wouldn’t encourage members of the public to attempt such.”

== Bibliography ==
- Baird, Bob (1995), Shipwrecks of the West of Scotland, Glasgow: Nekton Books, ISBN 1897995024
- Haswell-Smith, Hamish (2004). The Scottish Islands. Edinburgh: Canongate. ISBN 978-1-84195-454-7.
- Mac an Tàilleir, Iain (2003) Goireasan Cànain / Language Resources - Tadhail is Ionnsaich : Pàrlamaid na h-Alba. (pdf) Pàrlamaid na h-Alba. Retrieved 26 October 2025.
