= Eilean Rìgh =

Island in Argyll and Bute, Scotland

Eilean Rìgh (Gaelic)

Location
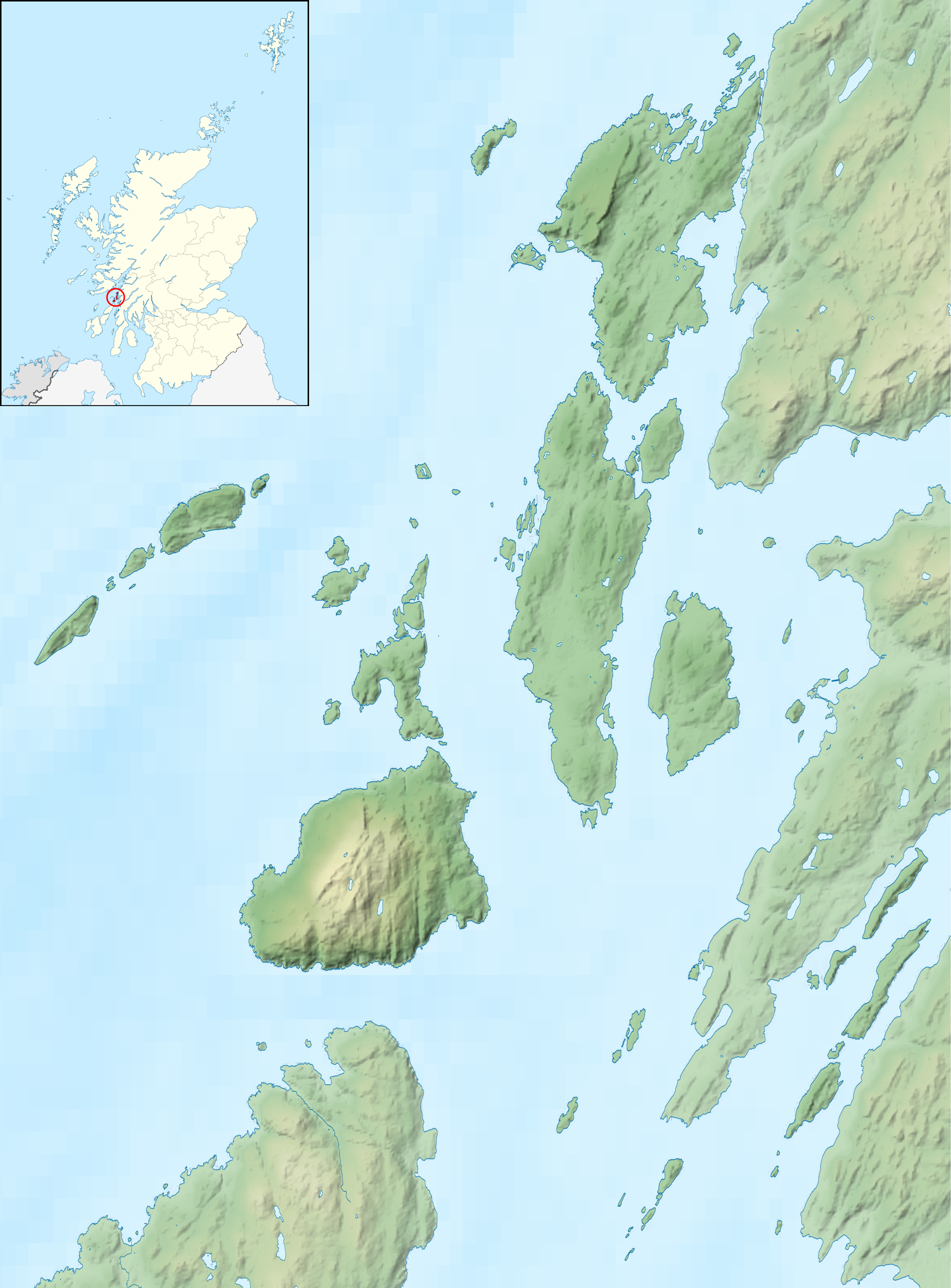
- Eilean Rìgh shown within Loch Craignish, and next to the Slate Islands, the Garvellachs, and Scarba Eilean Rìgh shown within Argyll and Bute
- OS grid reference: NM801018
- Coordinates: 56.16°N 5.54°W

Name
- Name meaning: King's Island

Physical geography
- Island group: Islay
- Area: 86 ha (11/32 sq mi)
- Area rank: 155=
- Highest elevation: Dùn Righ, 55 metres (180 ft)

Administration
- Council area: Argyll and Bute
- Country: Scotland
- Sovereign state: United Kingdom

Demographics
- Population: 2

Eilean Rìgh is an island in the Inner Hebrides of the west coast of Scotland. It lies in Loch Craignish, about 300 metres (1/8 mile) off the Argyll coastline. The name is Gaelic for "King's Island", although which royal is not known.

== History ==
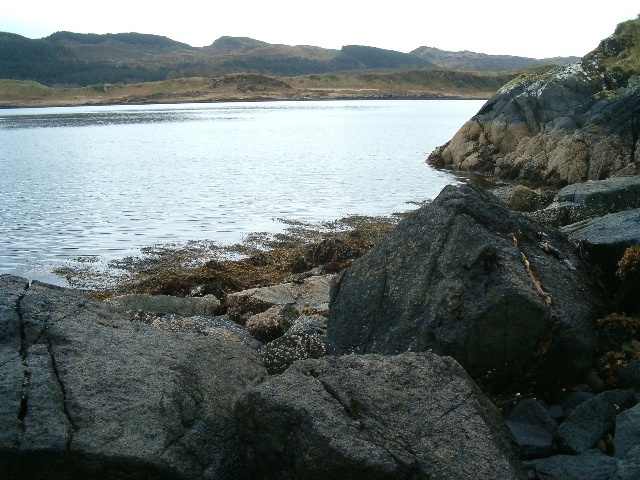
Looking south from Eilean Mhic Chrion to Eilean Rìgh

The island has the remains of two Iron Age forts.

In the 1930s, the island was home to Sir Reginald Johnston, retired tutor to Puyi, the last Chinese emperor. Johnston modernised the houses, built a Buddhist temple, and even flew the flag of Manchukuo in the Chinese-style gardens. Chinese servants lived in the farmhouse. In the multiple Oscar winning film by Bernardo Bertolucci The Last Emperor, Johnston was portrayed by Peter O'Toole.

The property was purchased by a retired Indian army officer, Major Campbell, who lived in it with his family until the outbreak of the Second World War; Campbell believed that a German submarine had entered the loch during the First World War and had caught sheep. In 1959 it was purchased by Wilfred Brown and his cousin Robert Banks Skinner. They believed that in the future the UK would become crowded and the island would be a place for some privacy, but it was largely used as a holiday home. In 1992 it was sold to James Waldegrave, Viscount Chewton.

The current owner is a Scottish-based ex-financier, Christian Siva-Jothy, who bought the island from Viscount Chewton in 1998. He substantially renovated the properties on it, installing mains electrics via an undersea power cable, a new fresh water well and telecoms via a microwave link. The island was for sale from 2013 for over a year but was taken off the market early in 2015 when Siva-Jothy sold his estate in the north of Scotland and moved back to live permanently on Eilean Righ. Siva-Jothy and his wife—who studied Mandarin at SOAS, where Johnston had been the first professor of Chinese—now reside full-time on the island.
