= Luing cattle =

Breed of cattle

Luing
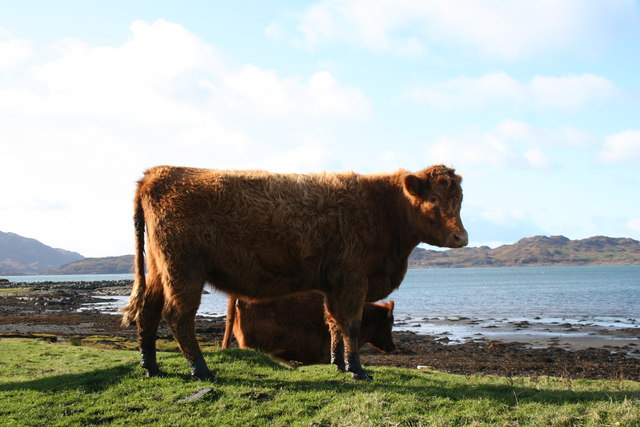
- A Luing cattle seen here on the Beach of Luing
- Country of origin: UK (Scotland)
- Use: Meat

Traits
- Weight: Male: 950 kg; Female: 500 kg
- Height: Male: 140 cm; Female: 130 cm
- Coat: Red, Dun

Luing cattle (pronounced ling cattle) are a beef breed developed on the island of Luing in the Inner Hebrides of Scotland by the Cadzow brothers in 1947. It was formed by first crossbreeding Beef Shorthorn with Highland cattle and then breeding the resulting progeny with Beef Shorthorns to produce an animal three quarters Beef Shorthorn, one quarter Highland. The breed of red-brown cattle are moderately sized and extremely hardy. The intent was to produce a good beef cow with the ability to raise a calf under adverse weather conditions. It was officially recognised as a breed by the British government in 1965. The breed is still farmed today, mainly in Scotland but also in other areas of the world.

== History ==
Luings were first created by the Cadzow brothers; Ralph, Denis and Shane, in 1947. They crossbred two types of cattle to produce the Luing; the Highland as the heifer and the Beef Shorthorn as the bull, and were the first new breed of cattle developed in Britain in over 100 years. The Highland was chosen as it contributes the hardiness that we see in the breed today and the Shorthorn because of its fleshing qualities and flavour of meat. Through a breeding programme, the three sons established the breed that we have today. In 1965, the breed was officially recognised by the British Government.

The Cadzow family continue to farm on Luing and the breed remains popular on the surrounding isles, including Scarba and Torsa. The breed has been exported to countries across the world including Canada and New Zealand, and is highly regarded for hardiness and ease of handling and marbling of its meat.

== Characteristics ==
The average Luing cow will give birth to 10 calves in a lifetime because of their longevity. This has been attributed to the traits inherited from their Highland cattle ancestors. They typically have hair of a medium length and a red or dun coloured coat.
