= Cuan Sound =

Coordinates: 56°16′5.66″N 5°37′45.38″W

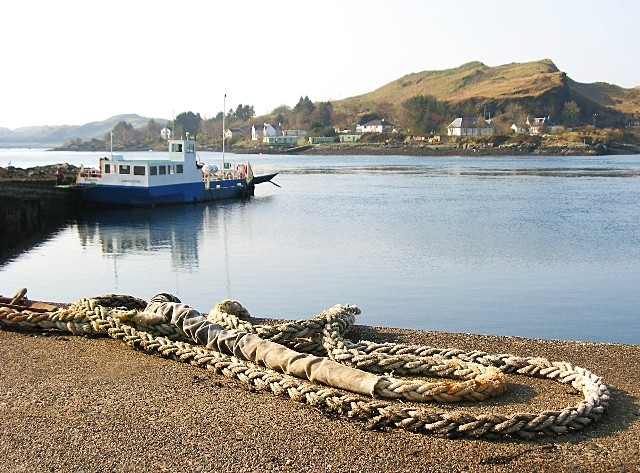
Cuan Sound

Cuan Sound is a narrow channel, 200 metres (660 ft) wide, located in Argyll, western Scotland. It separates Seil and Luing and later becomes the Firth of Lorn. It has a very strong current. In Cuan Sound, the north-going stream begins 4.5 hours after high water Oban and sets westward; the south-going stream begins 1.5 hours before high water Oban and sets eastward; the streams attain a rate of 7 knots at springs. This coast from Cuan Sound to Easdale Bay is in many places foul and rocky for 1.5 cables of it. Sgeir na Faoileann, a rock above water, one cable from the shore, and 3.5 cables northward of the entrance to Cuan Sound, is surrounded by foul ground, which extends 1.5 cables south-westward from it. Coirebhreacain and Cuan Sound are seldom attempted except near slack water.
