= Eilean Mhic Chrion =

Island in Scotland

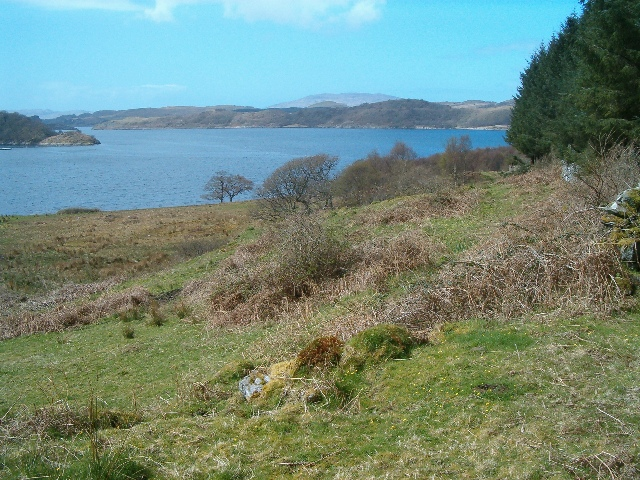
- Eilean Mhic Chrion from near Ormaig

Location
- Location within Argyll and Bute
- OS grid reference: NM803034
- Coordinates: 56.173°N 5.540°W

Name
- Name meaning: MacNiven's island

Physical geography
- Island group: Loch Craignish
- Area: 40 ha (99 acres)
- Area rank: 220=
- Highest elevation: 63 m (207 ft)

Administration
- Council area: Argyll and Bute
- Country: Scotland
- Sovereign state: United Kingdom

Demographics
- Population: 0

Eilean Mhic Chrion is a tidal island sheltering Ardfern in Loch Craignish, Scotland.

Eilean Mhic Chrion is one of 43 tidal islands that can be walked to from the mainland of Great Britain and one of 17 that can be walked to from the Scottish mainland.
