= Luing =

Island in Scotland

Luinn (Gaelic)
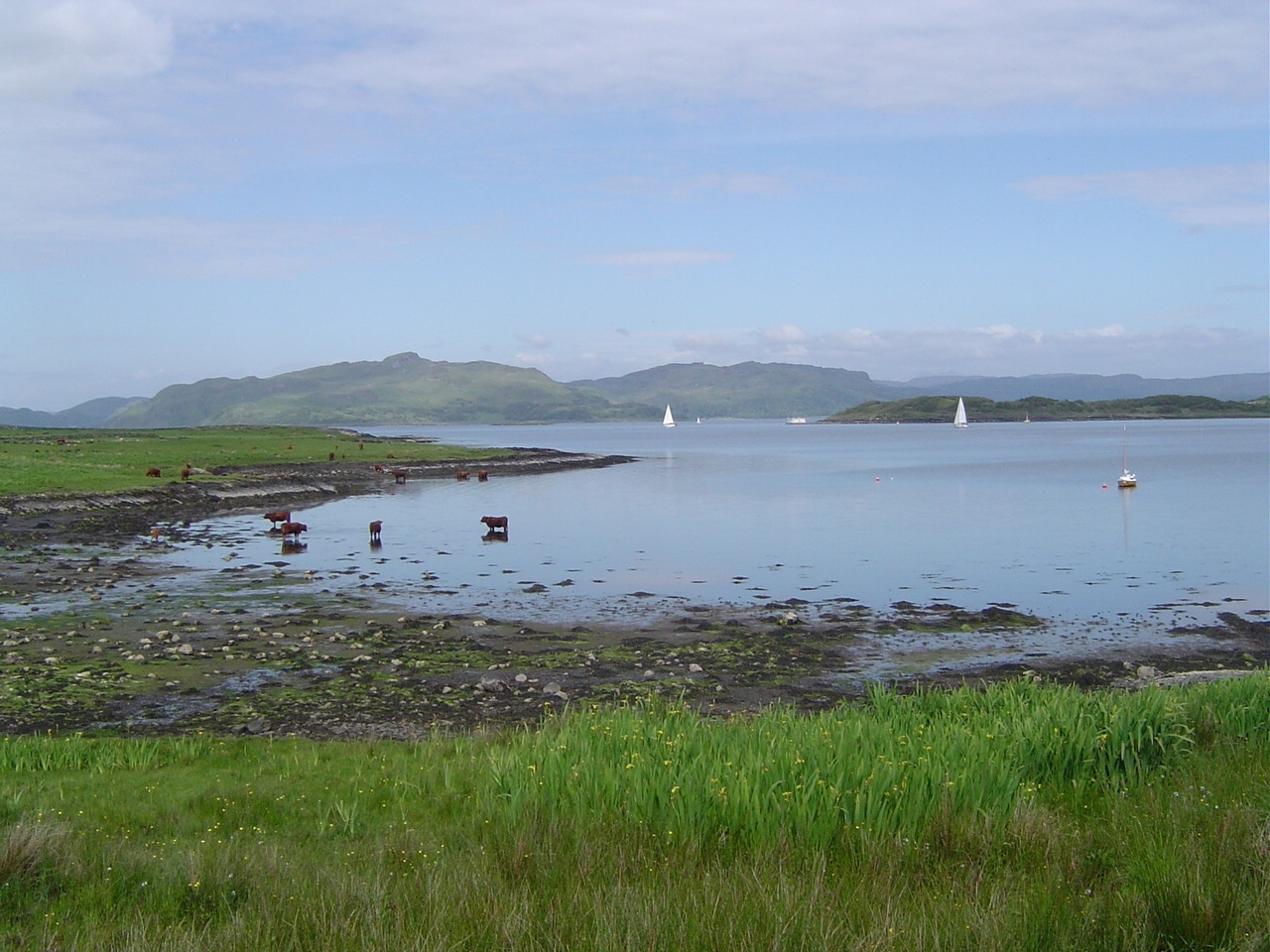
- View from near Toberonochy, Luing

Location
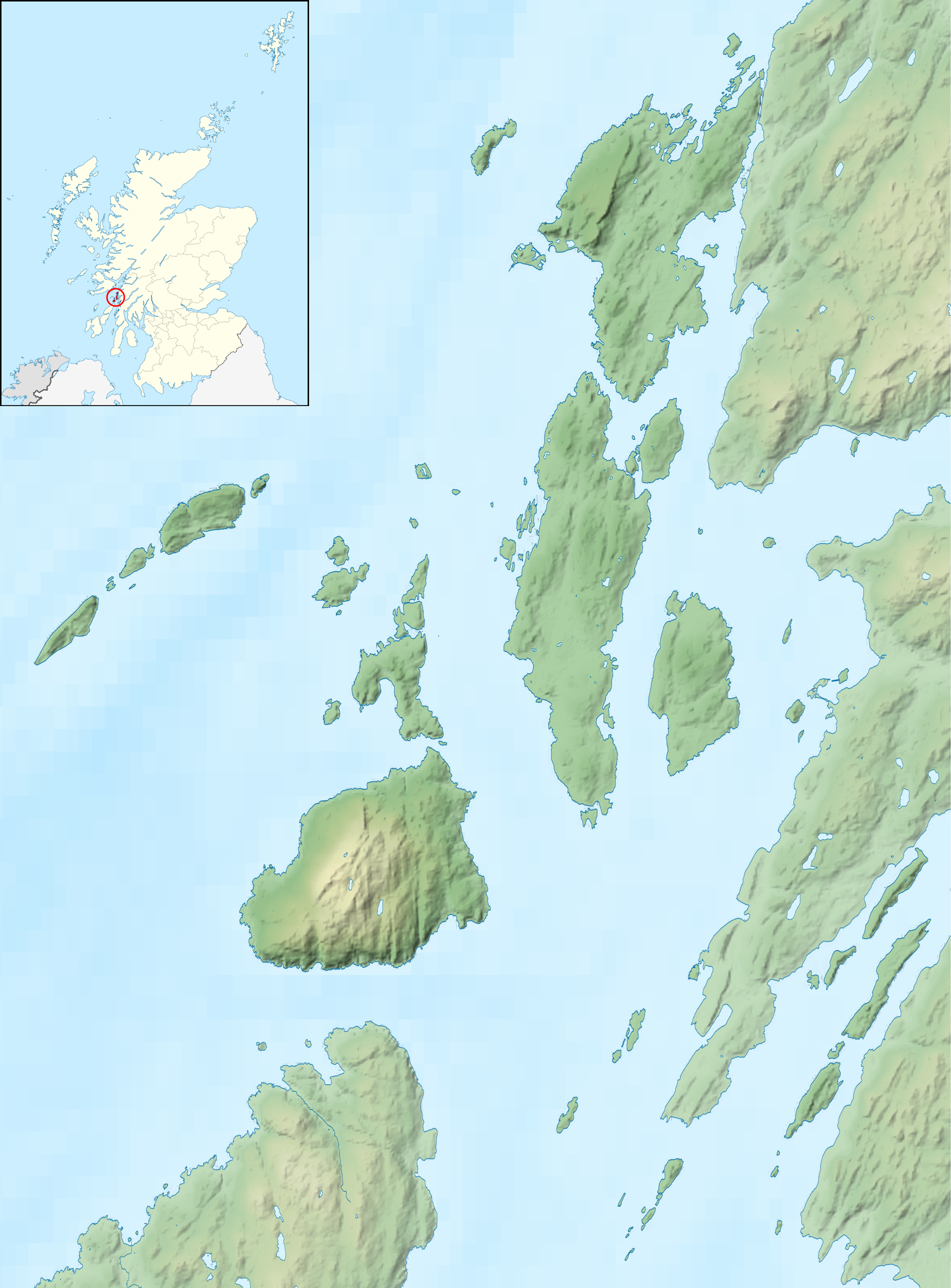
- Luing shown within the Slate Islands, and next to the Garvellachs, Scarba, and the isles of Loch Craignish Luing shown within Argyll and Bute
- OS grid reference: NM740100
- Coordinates: 56.22829819°N 5.64124049°W

Name
- Name meaning: pre-Gaelic name of unclear meaning

Physical geography
- Island group: Slate Islands
- Area: 1,430 ha (5 1/2 sq mi)
- Area rank: 40
- Highest elevation: Binneinn Furachail, 87 m (285 ft)

Administration
- Council area: Argyll and Bute
- Country: Scotland
- Sovereign state: United Kingdom

Demographics
- Population: 187
- Population rank: 35=
- Population density: 11.5/km^{2} (30/sq mi)
- Largest settlement: Cullipool/Culapul

Luing (/ˈlɪŋ/ LING; Scottish Gaelic: Luinn) is one of the Slate Islands, Firth of Lorn, in the west of Argyll in Scotland, about 16 miles (26 km) south of Oban. The island has an area of 1,430 hectares (3,500 acres) and is bounded by several small skerries and islets. It has a population of around 200 people, mostly living in Cullipool, Toberonochy (Tobar Dhonnchaidh), and Blackmillbay.

== Geology ==
The larger part of the bedrock of Luing is provided by the Neoproterozoic age Easdale Slate Formation, a pyritic, graphitic pelite belonging to the Easdale Subgroup of the Dalradian Argyll Group. Thin bands of quartzite are also present. Zones of metamorphosed intrusive igneous rocks occur within the northeast of the island. Luing is cut by NE-SW aligned Siluro-Devonian felsite dykes and by numerous later NW-SE aligned basalt and microgabbro dykes which form a part of the ‘Mull Swarm’ which is of early Palaeogene age. Raised marine deposits of sand and gravel occur widely around the margins of the island, a legacy of late Quaternary changes in relative sea-level.

== Economy and culture ==
A regular ferry service crosses the 200-metre-wide (660-foot) Cuan Sound which separates Luing from the neighbouring island of Seil, which is in turn connected by bridge to the mainland.

The main industries on Luing are tourism, lobster fishing and beef farming, although slate quarrying was important until 1965, with quarries at Toberonochy, Cullipool, and a smaller one at Port Mary. Slate from Luing was used in the construction of the University of Glasgow and re-roofing of Iona Abbey.

For such a small island, Luing has produced numerous mòd gold medallists: Nan MacInnes (1926, in Oban), Sandy Brown (1938, in Glasgow) and Hughie MacQueen (1985, in Lochaber).

Luing cattle were first developed here, as a commercial beef breed hardy enough to prosper under adverse weather. They are a breed of red beef cattle, produced by the Cadzow family in 1947 from a cross between Beef Shorthorn and Highland cattle.

== Etymology ==
According to Haswell-Smith (2004) the name "Luing" may derive from the Old Norse lyng, meaning "heather" or long meaning ship. However, Mac an Tàilleir (2003) states "this is probably a pre-Gaelic name of unclear meaning."

== History ==
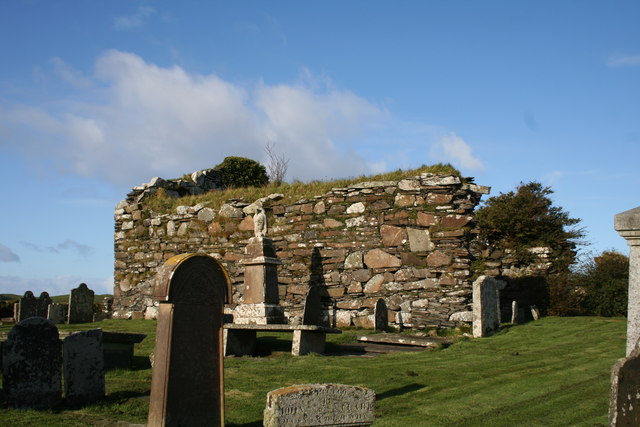
Ruins of Kilchattan Church

In the early part of the Christian era Luing would have formed part of the Gaelic kingdom of Dalriada. From the 9th to 13th centuries almost all of the Hebrides came under the control of Norse settlers and formed part of the Kingdom of the Isles. However, when Edgar of Scotland signed a treaty with Magnus Barefoot in 1098, formally acknowledged the existing situation by giving up Scottish claims to the Hebrides and Kintyre, Luing and Lismore were retained by the Scots.

The graveyard at the ruined church of Kilchattan documents the lives of past islanders, with quarriers, sailors and crofters side by side. Gravestones of note include those of Covenanter Alexander Campbell.
