= Loch Sunart to the Sound of Jura Marine Protected Area =

Protected area of sea off Scotland

Loch Sunart to the Sound of Jura MPA
- IUCN category IV (habitat/species management area)
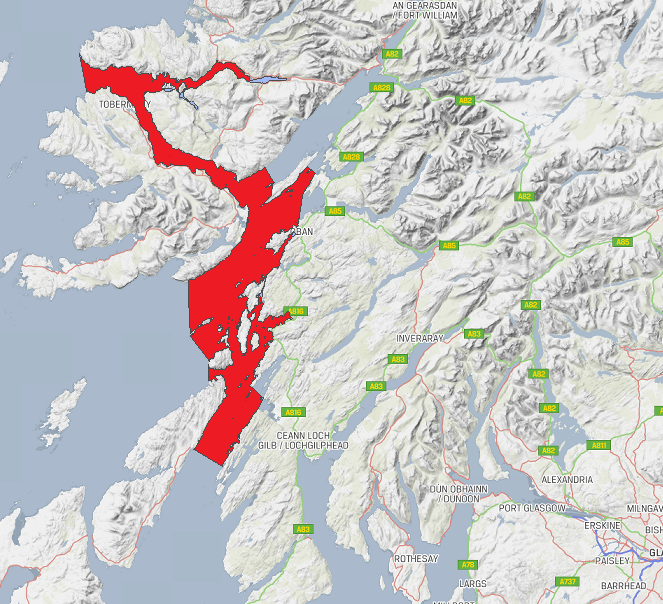
- Location: Lochaber, Scotland
- Coordinates: 56°26′N 5°34′W
- Area: 74,100 ha (286 sq mi)
- Designation: Scottish Government
- Established: 2014
- Operator: Marine Scotland

Loch Sunart to the Sound of Jura Marine Protected Area is a Marine Protected Area (MPA) off the west coast of Scotland. The MPA, which covers 741 km^{2} (286 sq mi), includes the waters of Loch Sunart, the Sound of Mull, the Firth of Lorne and the Sound of Jura. It has been designated to protect the population of common skate and the area's quaternary geological features. The MPA is designated a Category IV protected area by the International Union for Conservation of Nature.

Fishing activities are controlled within the MPA, and no suction dredging, mechanical dredging, beam trawling, demersal trawling or longline fishing is permitted.
