= Loch Craignish =

Coordinates: 56°09′N 5°34′W

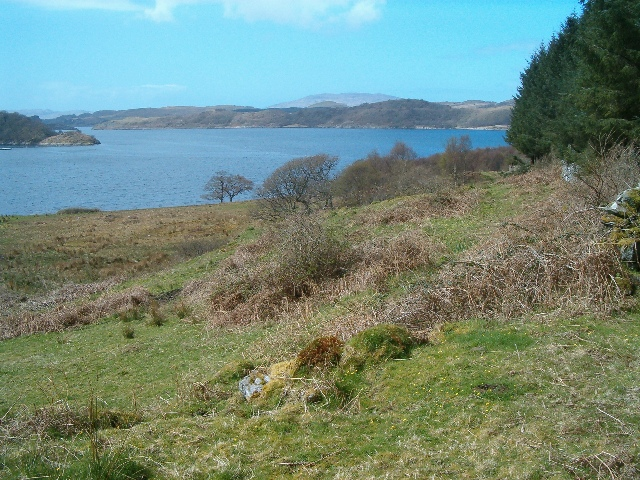

Loch Craignish is a sea loch on the mid-Argyll coast.

== Geography ==
Loch Craignish lies between Oban and the Crinan Canal. Its opens into the Sound of Jura and provides a safe anchorage for small craft.

Several islands lie within the loch, the largest being Eilean Rìgh, Eilean Mhic Chrion and Island Macaskin. The village of Ardfern lies on its northwestern shore.

== History ==
Loch Craignish was a crossroads for prehistoric settlers between Ireland and the Great Glen. A stone pier on the south of the peninsula was used by drovers from Jura and Knapdale.
