= Craobh Haven =

Coordinates: 56.211096°N 5.557709°W

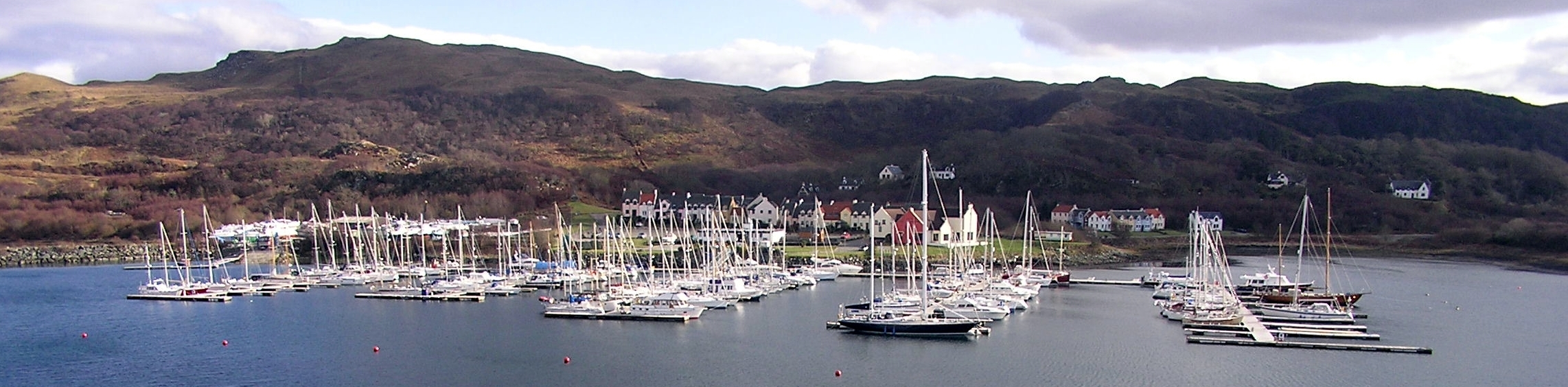
- Craobh Haven Village and Marina

- Location within Argyll and Bute
- OS grid reference: NM797075
  - Edinburgh: 93 mi (150 km)
  - London: 393 mi (632 km)
- Council area: Argyll and Bute
- Lieutenancy area: Argyll and Bute
- Country: Scotland
- Sovereign state: United Kingdom
- Post town: LOCHGILPHEAD
- Postcode district: PA31
- Police: Scotland
- Fire: Scottish
- Ambulance: Scottish
- UK Parliament: Argyll, Bute and South Lochaber
- Scottish Parliament: Argyll and Bute

Craobh Haven Scottish Gaelic pronunciation: [kɾɯːv] is a small purpose-built village and sailing port on the west coast of Argyll and Bute, Scotland. It is situated on the Craignish peninsula, 1 mile (1.6 km) to the west of the A816 road, approximately 22 miles (35 km) south of Oban. Craobh Haven is between Arduaine and Kilmartin, and around 17 miles (27 km) north of Lochgilphead.

Craobh Haven was built in 1983 as a holiday resort village and marina. Glasgow-based architects Gillespie, Kidd & Coia were involved in the early stages of the project, but were replaced before the construction of the buildings. The large, safe water marina was formed by the building of causeways and a large breakwater between a small group of tidal saltwater islands. The village has a restaurant called "The Lord of The Isles", a village store, as well as a harbourmaster and marina office. A watersports centre, together with holiday accommodation, is located on Eilean Buidhe, one of the small islands surrounding the marina. Within the village, there are two small terraces of houses, a group of small cottages, the majority of which are used as holiday rentals, and several small cottages and larger houses scattered around the outer edges and the hillside above the village.

The enclosed marina is very popular with private boat owners, but does not have anchorage for larger passenger vessels. There are occasional visits to the village by small cruise ships, touring the nearby islands, which land passengers by their ships boats to awaiting coaches, for sight-seeing trips ashore.

The waters to the north of Craobh Haven are part of the Firth of Lorne, and the village overlooks the Slate Islands, with Shuna being the closest. Beyond the Slate Islands are the Garvellachs, and to the southwest are the islands of Colonsay, Oronsay, Jura and Islay.

== Sailing ==
The waters surrounding the islands are extensively used for leisure sailing areas. A good knowledge of the area is required, with weather conditions likely to change very quickly. Due to the array of separate tidal races produced by the underwater topography there are some treacherous stretches of water. These include the 'Grey Dogs' and the Gulf of Corryvreckan, in which is located the infamous Corryvreckan whirlpool, which is the third largest whirlpool in the world. It surrounds a pyramid-shaped basalt pinnacle, rising from a depth of 230 feet (70 m) to 95 feet (29 m) below sea level, at its rounded top. It is not unusual to find 30-foot (9.1 m) high waves passing between the island at high tide.

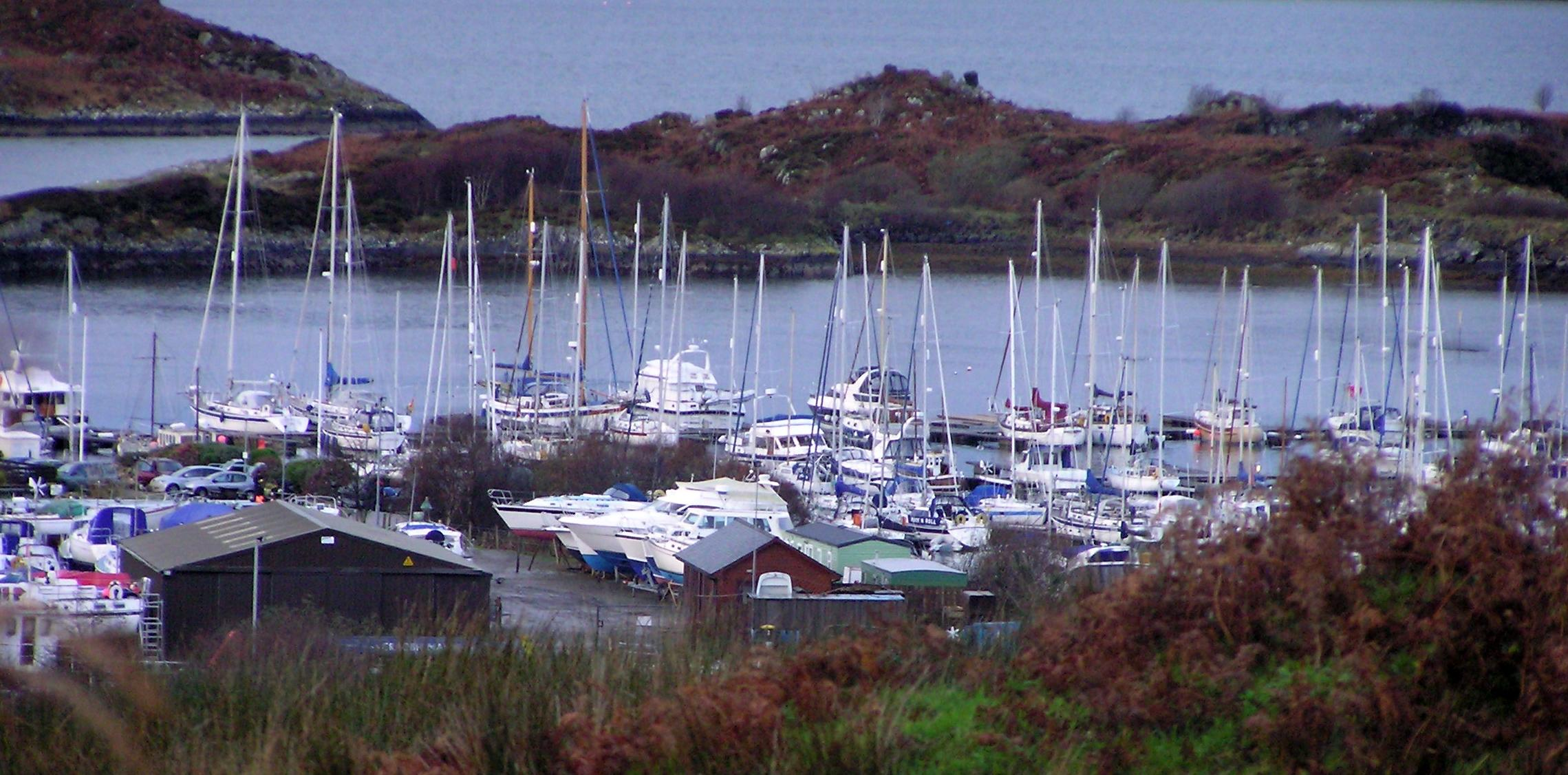
Craobh Haven Marina

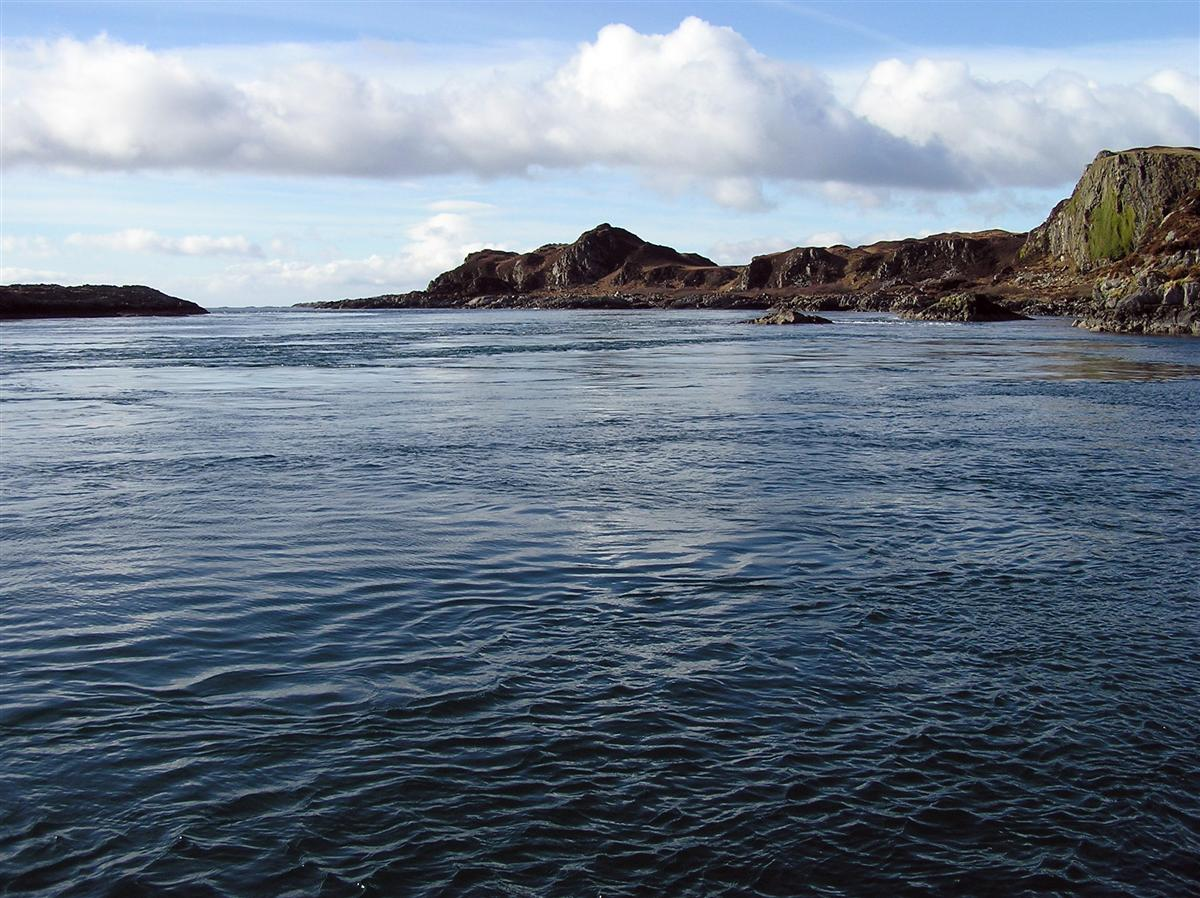
The Garvellachs

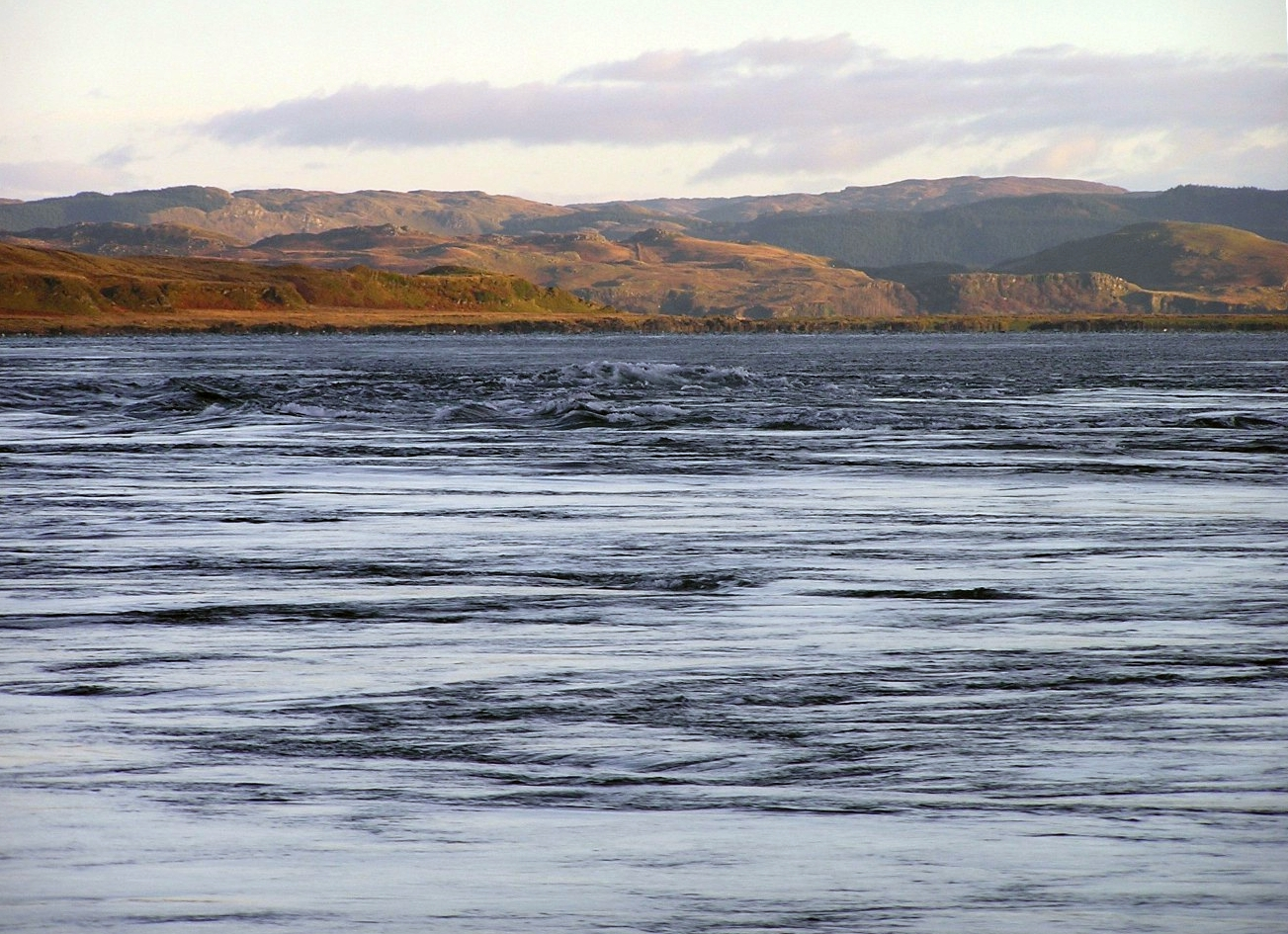
The Grey Dogs

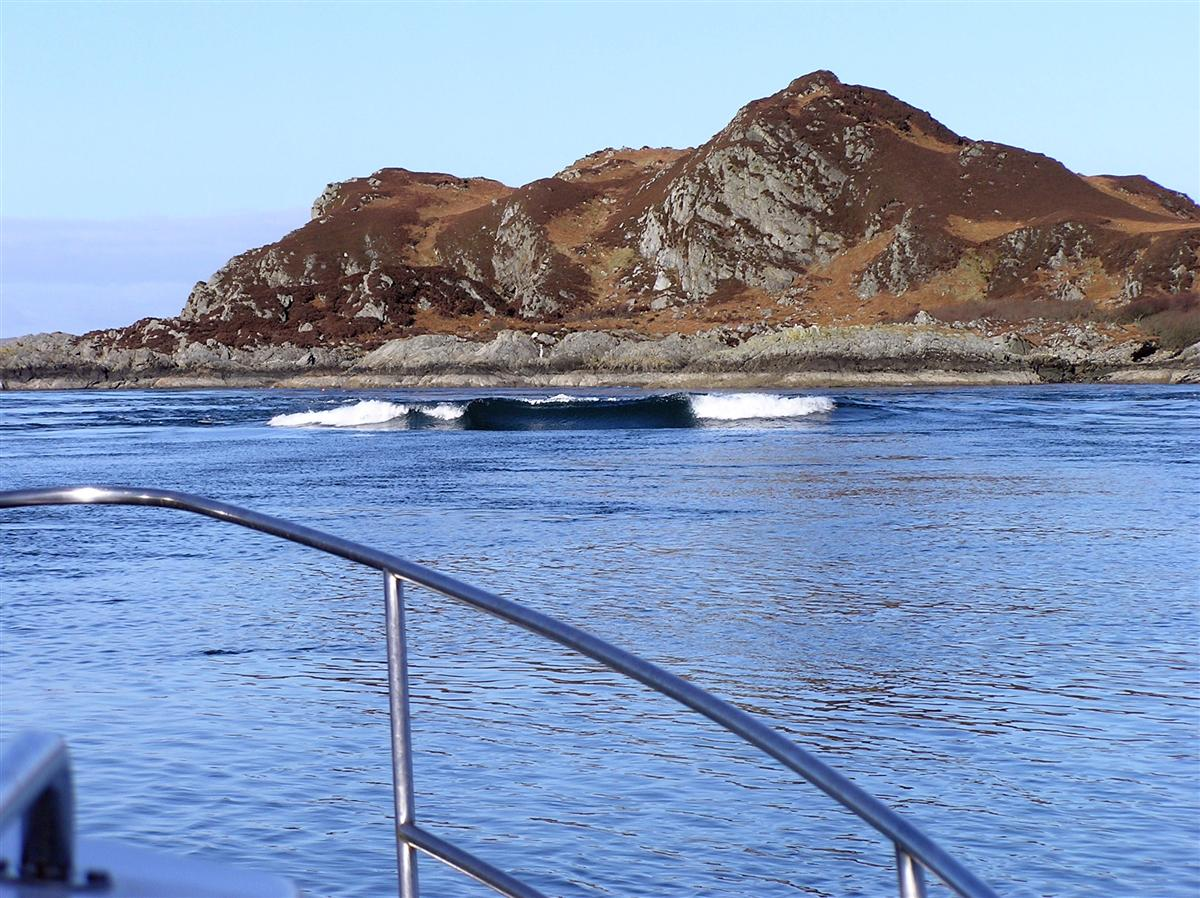
Garvellachs Tidal Flow

== Recreational diving ==
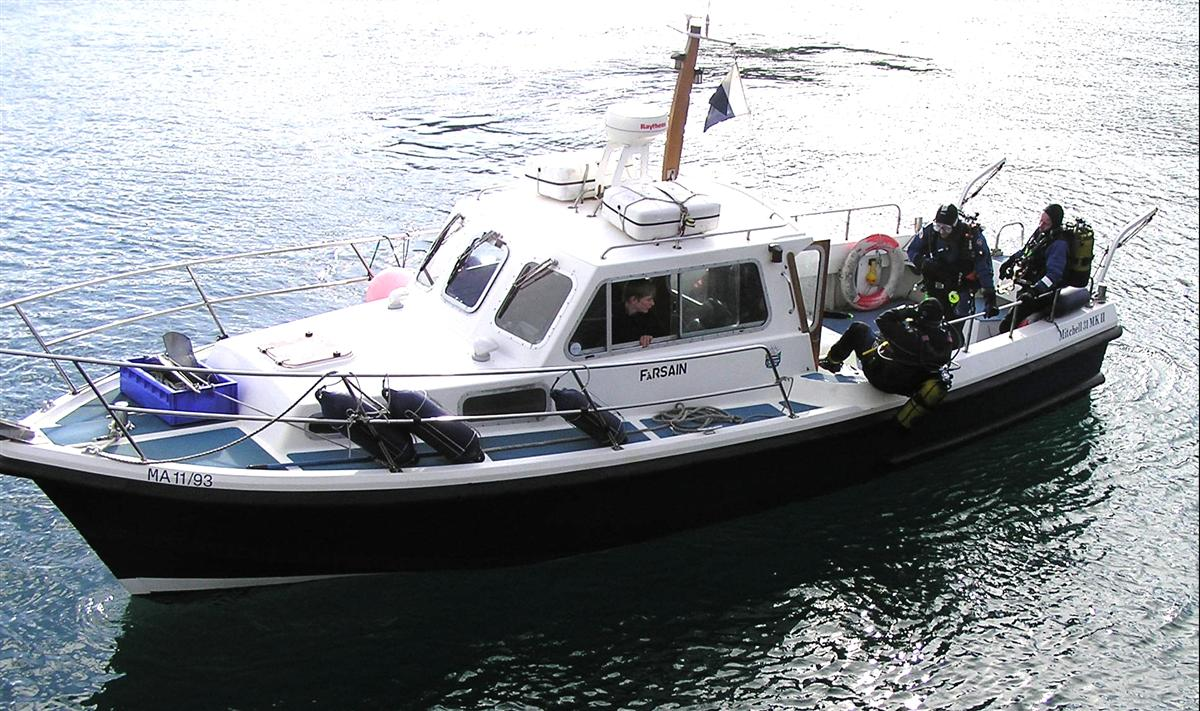
Divers aboard the Farsain, from Craobh Haven

The Garvellachs are particularly well known to divers, with boats from Oban also taking groups down to the area. Increasingly many divers are basing their activities from Craobh Haven itself. The waters, though somewhat devoid of fish, offer some very clear waters and an extensive array of corals, seastars, anemone, shellfish and underwater topographical features. The trips out to the dive sites also offer the opportunities to see golden eagles, sea eagles and porpoises. Due to the fast flowing waters in the Firth of Lorne minke whales may also be viewed occasionally.
