= Asknish =

Coordinates: 56.06°N 05.32°W

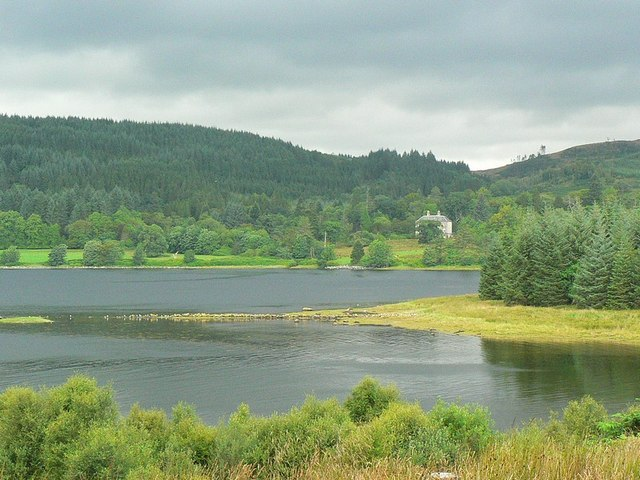
- Loch Gair and Asknish, 2008

- Location within Argyll and Bute
- OS grid reference: NR9391
- Council area: Argyll and Bute
- Country: Scotland
- Sovereign state: United Kingdom
- Police: Scotland
- Fire: Scottish
- Ambulance: Scottish

Asknish (Scottish Gaelic: Aisginis; from the Norse meaning "ashtree headland") is a settlement near the village of Lochgair in Argyll and Bute, Scotland.

The hamlet is made up of a large detached house (Asknish House) and farm buildings with a lodge and two other dwellings nearby on the A83 road. Asknish House was built in the late 18th century and was named "Lochgair" or "Lochgair Mansion House" until the late 19th century. It has been a Category B listed building since 1971.

Asknish House is built on or near the site of a castle owned by the Campbells of Auchinbreck, who sold the estate in 1768 to Robert Campbell of Asknish (Robert Campbell being a descendant of the MacIvers of Lergachonzie & Asknish, and Asknish being the original name of the settlement near Kilmelford now known as Arduaine).

The house was inherited by Duncan Paterson (whose grandfather had married a sister of Robert Campbell), and later by Aylmer Vivian (who had married a niece of Duncan Paterson). Both the Patersons and Vivians adopted the surname MacIver Campbell on inheriting the estate. In 1897 Colonel Aylmer MacIver Campbell (i.e. Aylmer Vivian) sold the old MacIver Asknish estate near Kilmelford, requiring its new owner James Arthur Campbell to rename it (the new owner then coined the name Arduaine), and renamed the Lochgair mansion house Asknish.
