= Arduaine =

Coordinates: 56°14′11″N 5°32′32″W

Arduaine: Scottish Gaelic: An Àird Uaine
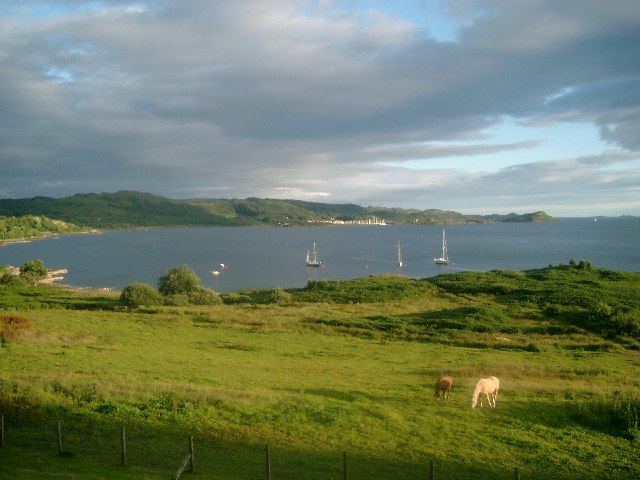
- Looking south over Loch Melfort from the Loch Melfort Hotel, Arduaine

- Location within Argyll and Bute
- OS grid reference: NM801100
- Council area: Argyll and Bute
- Lieutenancy area: Argyll and Bute
- Country: Scotland
- Sovereign state: United Kingdom
- Post town: OBAN
- Postcode district: PA34
- Police: Scotland
- Fire: Scottish
- Ambulance: Scottish
- UK Parliament: Argyll, Bute and South Lochaber
- Scottish Parliament: Argyll and Bute

Arduaine (Scottish Gaelic: An Àird Uaine, lit. 'green/fertile promontory or headland', pronounced "Ar-DOO-nee") is a Scottish coastal hamlet located on the A816 about 20 miles south of Oban and 18 miles north of Lochgilphead. It is in the council area of Argyll and Bute, at the southern boundary of the civil parish of Kilmelford and Kilninver, and comprises about two dozen houses, a hotel and restaurant, and a botanical garden.

The settlement was originally named Asknish, but tea planter J. Arthur Campbell was required to change the name when he bought the estate in 1897 (the previous owners of the estate then started using the name Asknish for the Lochgair mansion house that their predecessors had built in the late 18th century).

== History ==
=== Iron Age ===
The earliest known settlement in Arduaine is evidenced by the ruins of a late prehistoric dun on the headland, the name of which is given as Dungaivlaig on the mid-18th century Roy's map. Excavation of the site in 2011 failed to find any artefacts that might enable accurate dating. It is likely that the area was inhabited prior to the Iron Age too, as there is a Bronze Age cist at Degnish (opposite Arduaine on the other side of the mouth of Loch Melfort), and a cave on the southern slope of An Sidhean ("Fairy Hill") near Kilmelford was found to contain Stone Age artefacts.

There are dozens of ruined duns in the local area, the next nearest ones to Arduaine being:

- a D-shaped possible promontory fort at Creag Aoil (“Lime Rock”), a small headland about 1km NE of Arduaine further along the south coast of Loch Melfort.
- Dun Fadaidh (“Kindling Fort”) at Degnish.
- a 53m by 28m pear-shaped fort dated to around 300BC at Eilean An Duin ("Fort Island"), one of the Craobh Islands now connected to the mainland by a causeway near Craobh Haven marina.
- a galleried dun at Caisteal Nan Coin Duibh (“Castle of the Black Dogs”) on the northwest slopes of Mullach Dubh (“Black Hilltop”) near Craobh Haven.

=== Middle Ages ===
The local duns may have served various purposes, such as dwellings or meeting places, beacons or watchtowers, at different stages of the area's history. There have certainly been some turbulent periods when they could have formed useful parts of the area's maritime defences, for example:

- Romans did not settle locally but perhaps tried raiding the area for slaves from the 1st to 3rd centuries.
- There were 4th century raids by the Irish, who subsequently colonised Argyll and established the 5th to 8th century Kingdom of Dalriada. During this period, Asknish would have formed part of the tribal lands controlled by the Cenel Loairn (whose name persists as the district of Lorn).
- Dalriada itself then suffered 9th century raids by the Vikings, who subsequently colonised the outer and Inner Hebrides and established the 9th to 13th century Norse “Kingdom of the Isles”. The Norse origin of the name Asknish (“Ash(tree)" + "ness/headland”) suggests it may have been part of or at least on the borders of that territory.

=== 13th to 18th century ===
From 1222 onwards Asknish was a lairdship of the MacIvers of Lergachonzie (Lergachonzie being the old name of current farmland and holiday cottages at Lergychoniebeg and Lergychoniemor just to the south of Arduaine; the name perhaps derives from leargaidh-còinnich, or "mossy slopes"). The MacIvers were apparently granted these lands in return for their allegiance to Alexander II (King of Alba) during the 1221–22 subjugation of Argyll.

The early MacIver family's main seat is likely to have been Dun An Garbh-Sroine (“Fort of the Rocky Knoll”), a now ruined 84m by 34m rectangular fort (which would have been one of the largest forts in Argyll) near Garraron Farm about 1km south of Arduaine. The MacIvers allied with Clan Campbell and this fort could have been an important defence against coastal attacks on the Campbell powerbases further inland at Loch Awe.

The MacIvers later chose or were compelled to use the name MacIver Campbell, or simply Campbell; and after the lands of Lergachonzie were given as a dowry in the 17th century, they assumed the territorial designation “of Asknish”. The last male heir of the original MacIver of Lergachonzie chief was Robert Campbell of Asknish, who built himself a mansion house on an estate he bought near Lochgair in 1768.

=== 19th century ===
On Robert Campbell's death, his properties including Lochgair House and the Asknish estate passed initially to Duncan Paterson (whose predecessor had married Robert Campbell's sister Agnes), and later to Aylmer Vivian (who had married Duncan Paterson's daughter Margaret); however, on taking possession of their inheritance both the Paterson and Vivian families adopted the surname MacIver Campbell, perhaps hoping to bathe in the clan's reflected glory. They lived at Lochgair House while tenant farmers at Asknish and other estates provided them with an income.

Census data indicates there were between three and five households in Asknish in the 19th century, apparently the main farmhouse and two to four farmworkers’ cottages.

=== 20th century ===
In 1897, tea planter J. Arthur Campbell bought the Asknish estate from Aylmer Vivian, then known as Colonel Aylmer MacIver Campbell of Lochgair. Arthur Campbell renamed the Asknish estate as “Arduaine” and started to replace the old Asknish farmhouse with a new house for his family, while Colonel MacIver Campbell began using the name Asknish for his Lochgair mansion.

Arthur Campbell's new Arduaine house was sold by his grandson to hoteliers in 1967 and is now the Loch Melfort Hotel and Restaurant; the house's nearby botanical garden, now known as Arduaine Garden, was sold separately in 1971 and eventually gifted to National Trust Scotland in 1992.

The settlement of Arduaine grew significantly in size in the mid-20th century, with one of the first additions being a shop and post office known as Arduaine Stores at the foot of Beinn Chaorach overlooking the newly built Arduaine Jetty. A caravan and camping site was created on the shore to the north of the jetty, and from the 1970s onwards several parcels of land near the shop were sold off as building plots, mostly for private residences but also including a cafe known as Arduaine Tearooms that was built with grants from the Highlands and Islands Development Board. However, by the end of the 20th century both the post office and cafe had closed and been converted to holiday homes; the caravan site had also closed and was in the process of being divided into three building plots for the private residences now seen there.

== Transport & Amenities ==
Arduaine is on the 23 and 423 bus route along the A816 between Oban and Ardrishaig.

Arduaine Jetty is the "ferry terminal" for the private boats taking holidaymakers to and from the cottages on the privately owned island of Shuna, as well as a launch point for sea kayak tours, paddle-boarders, divers and wild swimmers. There is a dedicated carpark next to the jetty for the vehicles supporting the sea kayak tours.

Asknish Bay also has a handful of buoy moorings mostly used by hotel and restaurant guests visiting by yacht.

Other amenities include a postbox, red telephone box (scheduled for decommissioning in 2025), glass bottle recycling banks and a waste skip.

== Geography ==
Arduaine is a coastal hamlet most of which overlooks Asknish Bay, a horseshoe-shaped sea inlet which lies at the northeastern end of Loch Shuna. A geologic spit on the south side of Arduaine Point points to the rocky intertidal reef Eich Donna ("Brown Horses""), a formation which rises again further south as Eilean Creagach ("Craggy Island"). Eilean Gamhna ("Bullock Island") lies just off the west of Arduaine Point, and Loch Melfort is to the north (some older maps refer to this southern end of Loch Melfort as North Asknish Bay). To the east of Arduaine the land rises steeply to a line of three successively higher peaks: Beinn Chaorach (“Sheepy Hill”), Càrn Dearg (“Red Ridge”) and Tom Solleir (“Shining Mount”). On Roy's map this hilly moorland is labelled “Slientime”, a name no longer in use and of unknown etymology.

== Folklore ==
An Cnap - the hillock which rises in the middle of Arduaine Point - is referenced as Cnap-Aisginis ("Asknish Hill") by William Mackenzie in his 1895 collection of Gaelic incantations, which describes a ritual intended to cure ulcerous swellings of the armpit by chanting the names of specific local hills; the idea is that the patient's swelling gets magically apportioned between those hills. In one example of the incantation collected on Colonsay, the names of twenty-seven local hills are recited, including "So air Mam Aisginis" ("This [part of the swelling apportioned] to Asknish Hill").

== Notable Residents ==
Brigadier Sir Bruce Atta Campbell 2nd of Arduaine, KCB CBE TD (1888 – 1954), a British Army officer appointed as Lord Lieutenant of Argyllshire in 1949. He was Arthur Campbell's eldest son and lived in Arduaine House after the death of his mother Ethel in 1936.

== Arduaine Gardens ==
Arduaine is home to the Arduaine Gardens which are in the care of the National Trust for Scotland and listed on the Inventory of Gardens and Designed Landscapes in Scotland.
