= Captain William Todd =

Architect based in Lochgilphead

Erines House, 1912-14

Captain William Todd R.G.A. (T.F.) (26 June 1876 - 29 June 1915) was an architect based in Lochgilphead.

== Early life ==
He was the eldest son of George Todd (1840-1884) and Mary C. Field (1850-1938) of Haghill East, Glasgow and was educated at Kelvinside Academy

He married Allyce McMillan in 1907 and they had two children:

- George M. Todd (b. 1908)
- Elizabeth M. Todd (b. 1910)

== Military Career ==
He was gazetted second lieutenant commanding the 10th Corps of the 1st Argyll and Bute Artillery Volunteers.

On the outbreak of the First World War he went for training in Bedford and was promoted to Captain. He was in the Argyll and Buteshire 4th Highland Mountain Battery on the Gallipoli Peninsula at the Dardanelles where he was acting Major. During the Battle of Gully Ravine he sustained fatal injuries on 28 June 1915 and died the day afterwards.

He was awarded the 1914-15 Star, the British War Medal and the Victory Medal.

His name is recorded on the Lochgilphead War Memorial which we unveiled in 1921.

== Architectural Career ==
He was burgh surveyor for Lochgilphead for a number of years.

In 1904 he took over the business of Neil Gillies in Lochgilphead and the business was called Gillies & Todd of Lochgilphead.

== List of works ==
- Duncraobhan, Manse Brae Lochgilphead 1906
- Manse, United Free Church, Ardrishaig 1906-07
- Masonic Lodge, Lochnell Street, Lochgilphead 1909
- Church Hall, Lochgilphead Parish Church 1911
- Church Hall and vestry, Cumlodden Parish Church 1911
- Public Hall, Chalmers Street, Ardrishaig ca 1912
- Erines House on the Stonefield Castle Estate 1912-14

== Sources ==
- Walker, Frank Arneil (2000). Argyll and Bute (Pevsner Architectural Guides: Buildings of Scotland). Yale University Press. p. 466. ISBN 0300096704.
