= Neil Gillies =

Architect based in Lochgilphead

Shuna Castle in 1986

Neil Gillies C.E. (b.1866) was an architect based in Lochgilphead from the 1890s to around 1904 noted for his work in Argyllshire.

== Life ==
He was born on 8 November 1866, the son of Donald Gilles (1838-1891) and Amelia McGilp (1841-1916). Until at least 1891 he was resident in his father’s house at 7 Union Street, Lochgilphead.

In 1889 he was awarded an associateship in the Sanitary Institute of Great Britain following examination in London in November.

in 1891 he was appointed by North and South Argyll District Committee as road surveyor for the district in the place of his late father, Donald Gilles. He held this post until 1904 when he resigned on accepting a position with Messrs Waring and Son of London as superintending architect at home and abroad.

Around the same time his architectural practice was taken over by William Todd and the business was called Gillies & Todd of Lochgilphead.

== List of works ==
- New Free Church Mission Hall, Lochmaddy 1890
- Invernkill House, Ardrishaig (addition) 1892
- Police Station, Tighnabruaich 1896
- Steading, Kennacraig Farm, Stonefield Estate, Tarbert, Lochfyne 1898
- Court House and Police Station, Lochnell Street, Lochgilphead (extension) 1899
- Free Church, Tayvalich 1899
- Crinan Hotel 1900 (destroyed by fire 1917)
- Drill Hall and Public Library, Tarbert 1902
- Argyllshire Sanatorium, Benvoulin, Oban 1909
- Shuna Castle Shuna, Slate Islands 1911 (now derelict)
