= Shuna, Slate Islands =

Island in the Firth of Lorne in Argyll and Bute, Scotland

Shuna
Siùna (Gaelic)
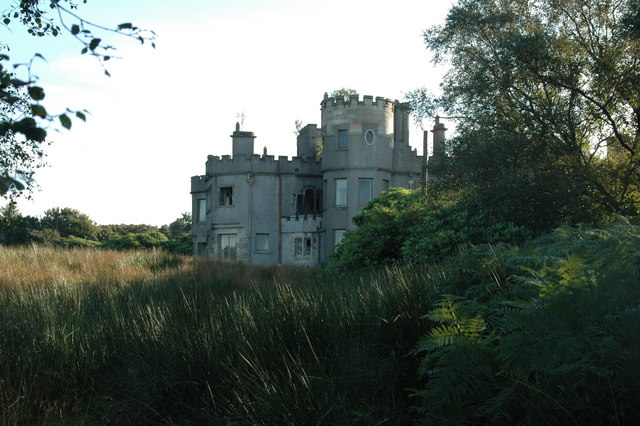
- The ruined castle

Location
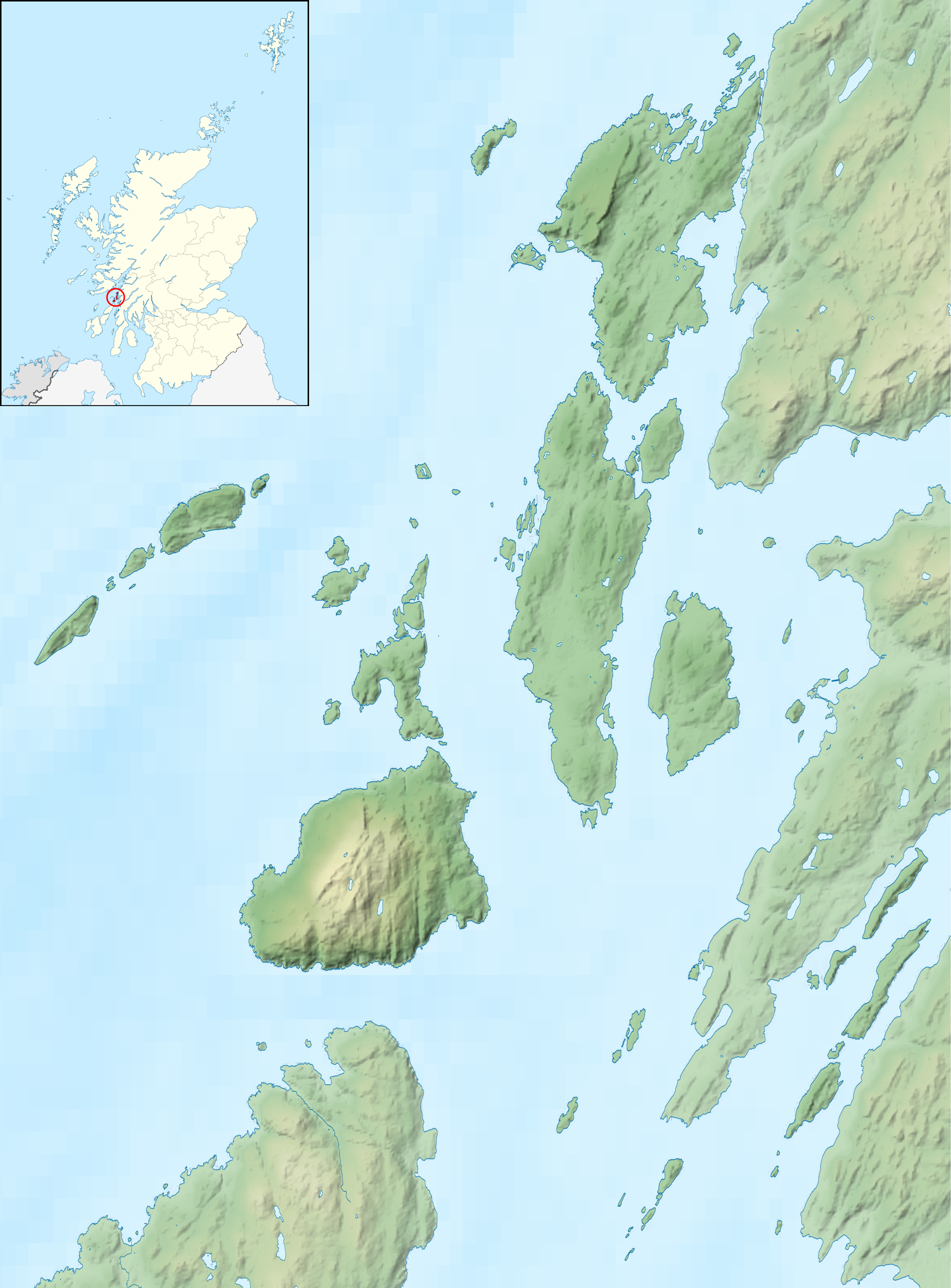
- Shuna shown within the Slate Islands, and next to the Garvellachs, Scarba, and the isles of Loch Craignish Shuna shown within Argyll and Bute
- OS grid reference: NM760080
- Coordinates: 56.21°N 5.61°W

Name
- Name meaning: Most likely from Norse sjòn-a, meaning "watching island"

Physical geography
- Island group: Slate Islands
- Area: 451 ha (1,114 acres)
- Area rank: 74
- Highest elevation: Druim na Dubh Ghlaic, 90 m (295 ft)

Administration
- Council area: Argyll and Bute
- Country: Scotland
- Sovereign state: United Kingdom

Demographics
- Population: 2
- Population rank: 88=
- Population density: 0.44/km^{2} (1.1/sq mi)

Shuna is one of the Slate Islands offshore of Arduaine lying east of Luing in the Firth of Lorn north of the Sound of Jura on the west coast of Scotland.

Unlike the other Slate Islands, Shuna has little slate, and has historically been farmed, although it is now overgrown with woodland. There are several cairns in the south and west of the small island.

During the nineteenth century the population numbered up to 69, but by the 2001 census Shuna was one of four Scottish islands with a population of just one.

== History ==
In 1815, James Yates, a Glasgow native living in Woodville in Devon, bought the island from Colonel McDonald of Lynedale. In 1829 Yates bequeathed the island in trust to the magistrates and council of Glasgow, with profits from the estate divide two fifths to the city, two fifths to Glasgow University and one fifth to Glasgow Royal Infirmary. This was disputed by Yates' heir, who accepted £300 from the trustees to settle his claim. The revenue from the island was scarce and the trustees sold it in 1910 for the sum of £4,000 (equivalent to £407,400 in 2025) to George Buckley.

In 1912 Buckley provided a 22 feet (6.7 m) pontoon motor boat Blue Duck by James Adam of Gourock with a bow which could be lowered to allow the transport of sheep and cattle stock between the island and the mainland.

The island was sold again in 1919 for the sum of £21,000 (equivalent to £937,500 in 2025) to Hubert J. Whitcomb of London. In 1922 a motor yacht Mikani was launched from the yard of Munro’s Shipbuilding Yard at Kerrera, Oban. Commissioned by Hubert Whitcomb it was 30 feet (9.1 m) in length, 8 feet (2.4 m) beam and 3 feet 6 inches (1.07 m) draught.

In 1937 Monica Allen, the owner of Shuna, and daughter of Belfast shipping magnate Charles E Allen of the Allen Shipping Line, married Robert Sutherland of Caithness, at one time gamekeeper to her father. They settled in Shuna with a plan to cultivate the island.

The island has been privately owned by the Gully family, Viscounts Selby, since 1946. It is currently occupied by a farmer and his family, who let four houses as holiday cottages and had a usually resident population of 3 in 2011 and 2 in 2022. The holidaymakers are brought onto the island by boat from the jetty at Arduaine on the mainland.

In 2025, freehold possession of the island, including all buildings, was listed for sale at £5.5 million.

== Shuna Castle ==
Shuna Castle in 1986

Shuna Castle (also known as Shuna House) was built in 1911. It is a concrete house built in mock castle style designed by the architect Neil Gillies formerly of Lochgilphead.

Shuna Castle fell into disrepair when the cost of maintenance became too great and has been uninhabited since 1985.

== Wildlife ==
The island has healthy populations of red, roe and fallow deer; along with otters, common and grey seals, porpoises and dolphins out on the water.
