= List of islands of Scotland =

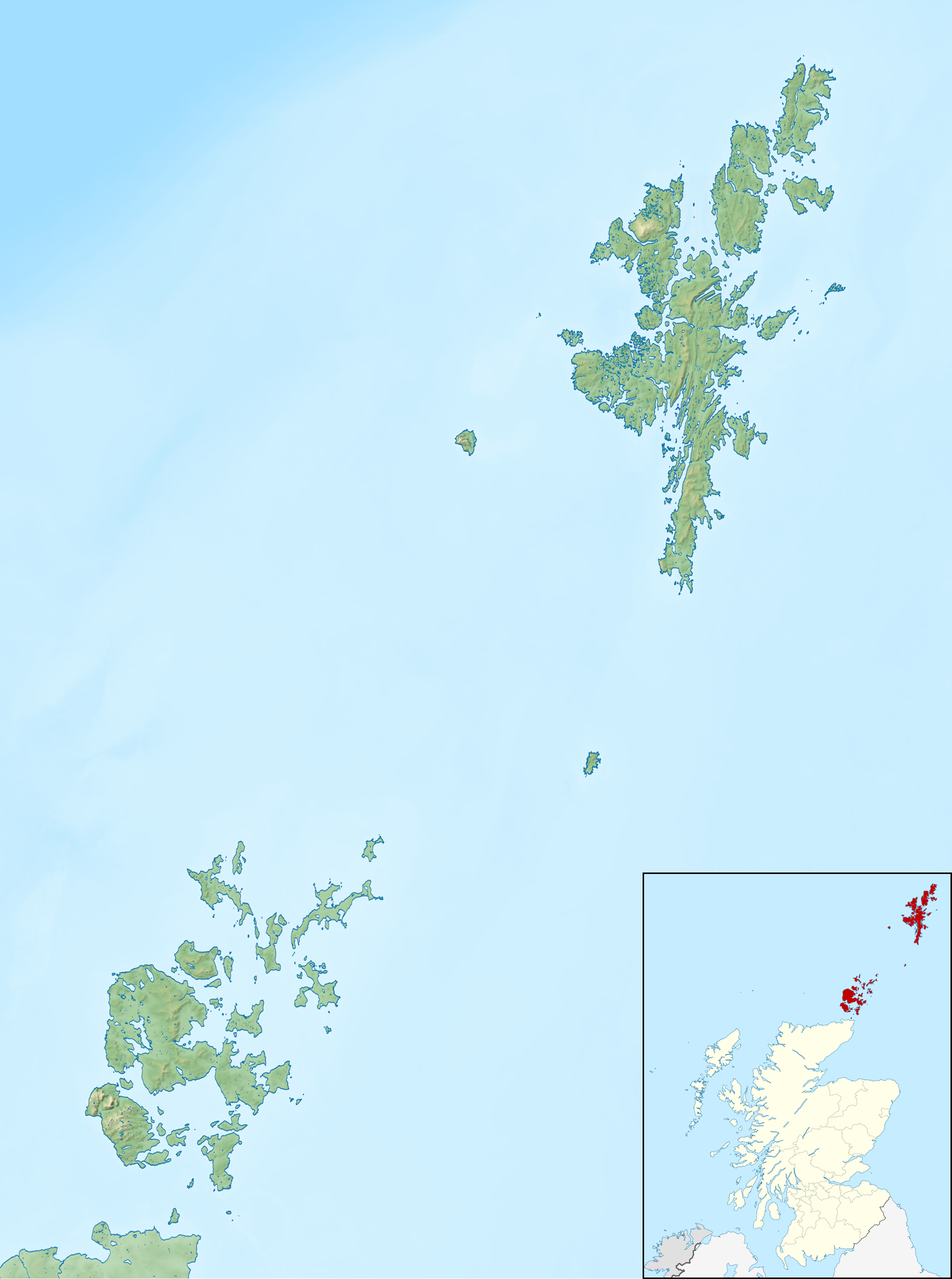
Map of the Northern Isles of Orkney and Shetland

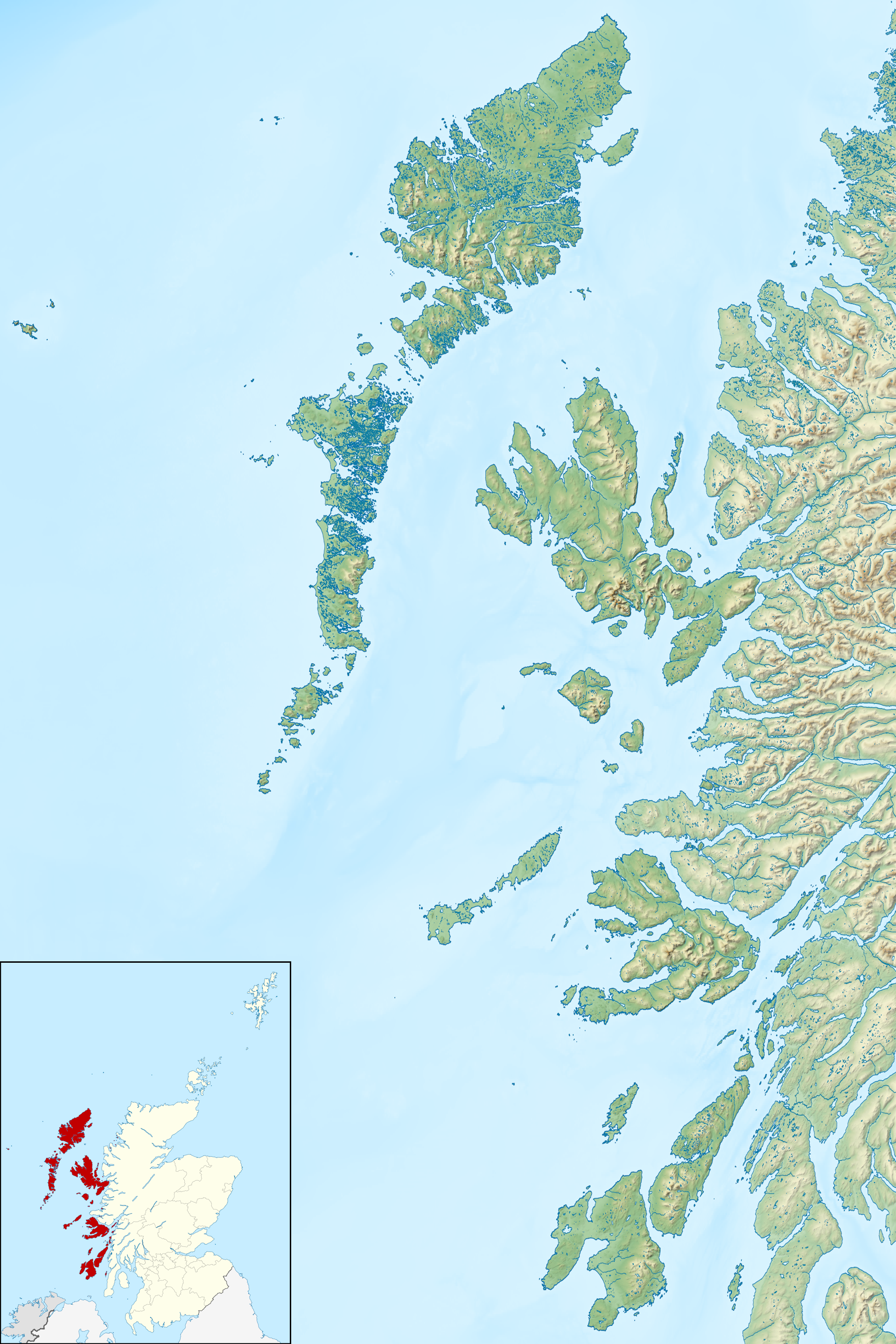
Map of the Inner and Outer Hebrides

This is a list of islands of Scotland, the mainland of which is part of the island of Great Britain. Also included are various other related tables and lists. The definition of an offshore island used in this list is "land that is surrounded by seawater on a daily basis, but not necessarily at all stages of the tide, excluding human devices such as bridges and causeways". (Note: Various other definitions are used. For example the General Register Office for Scotland define an island as "a mass of land surrounded by water, separate from the Scottish mainland" but although they include islands linked by bridges etc. this is not clear from this definition. Haswell-Smith (2004) uses "an Island is a piece of land or group of pieces of land which is entirely surrounded by water at Lowest Astronomical Tide and to which there is no permanent means of dry access". This is widely agreed to be unhelpful as it excludes bridged islands. However, the large numbers of small tidal islets essentially defy categorisation.)

Scotland has around 900 offshore islands, most of which are to be found in four main groups: Shetland, Orkney, and the Hebrides, sub-divided into the Inner Hebrides and Outer Hebrides. There are also clusters of islands in the Firth of Clyde, Firth of Forth, and Solway Firth, and numerous small islands within the many bodies of fresh water in Scotland including Loch Lomond and Loch Maree. The largest island is Lewis and Harris, which extends to 2,179 km^{2} (841 sq mi), and there are a further 200 islands which are greater than 40 hectares (100 acres) in area. Of the remainder, several, such as Staffa and the Flannan Isles, are well known, despite their small size. Some 101 Scottish islands are currently permanently inhabited, of which 89 are offshore according to 2011 census data. Between 2001 and 2011, Scottish island populations as a whole grew by 4% to 103,702 although by 2022 the total had fallen back to just under 103,000. (Note: The RESAS data is not totalled but a figure of 102,900 can be derived from adding the individual figures on the list. This total excludes an entry for a population of 46 on 'Mainland', which does not appear to refer to any island and the 'island' of Rubha nan Gall, which is listed with a population of 6. As the name implies, and as both OS maps and the locations holiday cottage website make clear, this is a headland, not an island. There are other complications. The total of all the islands in the island local authority areas do not appear to add up to the total provided by the 2022 census for those authorities. The raw data held by the National Records of Scotland is here but not in an accessible format.)

The geology and geomorphology of the islands is varied. Some, such as Skye and Mull, are mountainous, while others like Tiree and Sanday are relatively low-lying. Many have bedrock made from ancient Archaean Lewisian Gneiss which was formed 3 billion years ago; Shapinsay and other Orkney islands are formed from Old Red Sandstone, which is 400 million years old; and others, such as Rùm, from more recent Tertiary volcanoes. Many of the islands are swept by strong tides, and the Corryvreckan tide race between Scarba and Jura is one of the largest whirlpools in the world. Other strong tides are to be found in the Pentland Firth between mainland Scotland and Orkney, and another example is the "Grey Dog" between Scarba and Lunga.

The culture of the islands has been affected by the successive influences of Celtic-, Norse- and English-speaking peoples, and this is reflected in names given to the islands. From the ninth to the thirteenth centuries, most of the Scottish islands were united under the Norse-Gaelic Lordship of the Isles. Many of the Hebrides have names with Scots Gaelic derivations, whilst those of the Northern Isles tend to be derived from the Viking names. A few have Brythonic, Scots and even perhaps pre-Celtic roots.

A feature of modern life in the islands is their low crime rate, and they are considered to be among the safest places to live in Britain. Orkney was rated as the best place to live in Scotland in both 2013 and 2014, according to the Halifax Quality of Life survey.

Rockall is a small rocky islet in the North Atlantic which was declared part of Scotland by the Island of Rockall Act 1972. However, despite no possession by any other state and other precedents, the legality of the claim is disputed by the Republic of Ireland, Denmark and Iceland, and some say it may be unenforceable in international law.

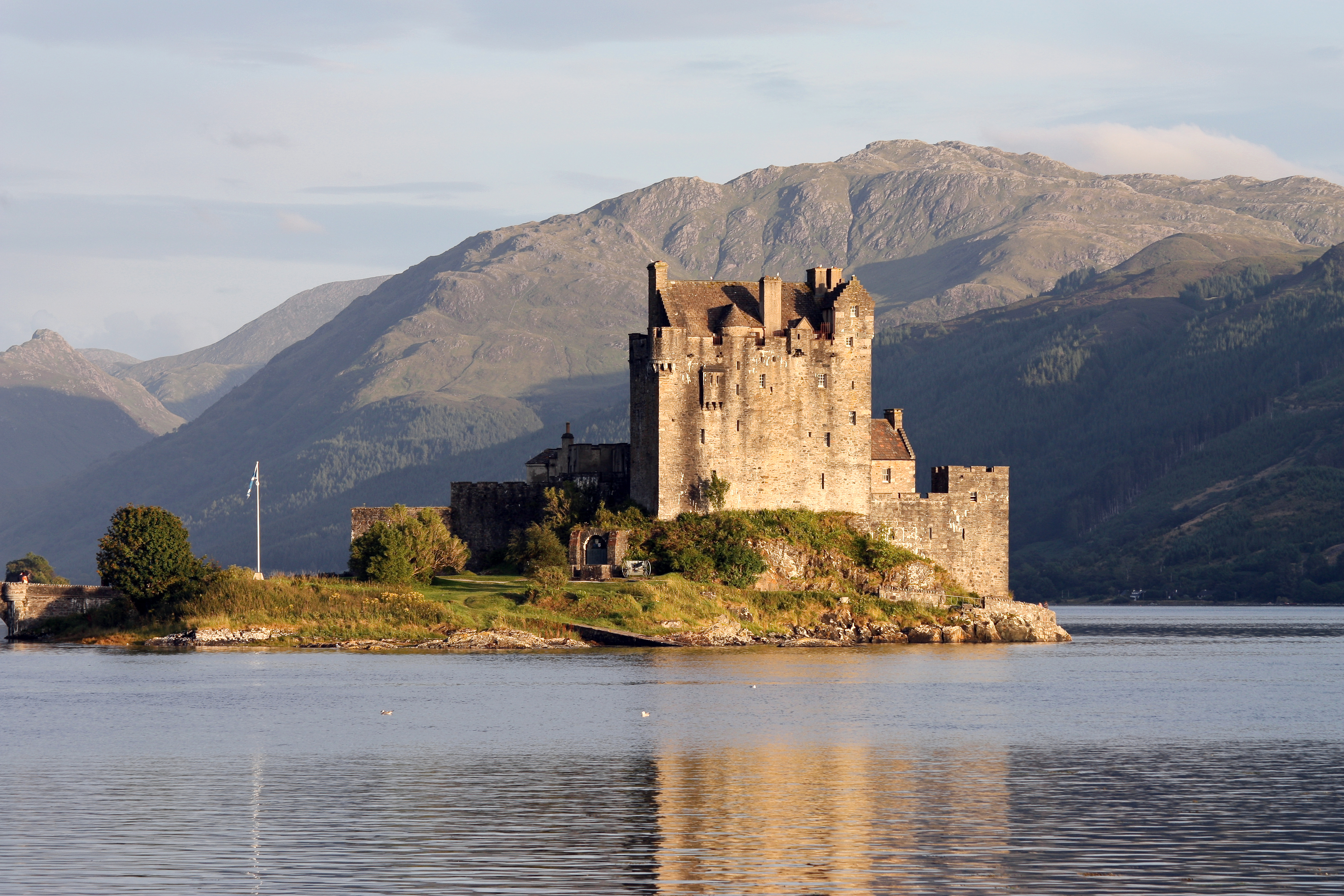
Eilean Donan castle

== Demographics ==
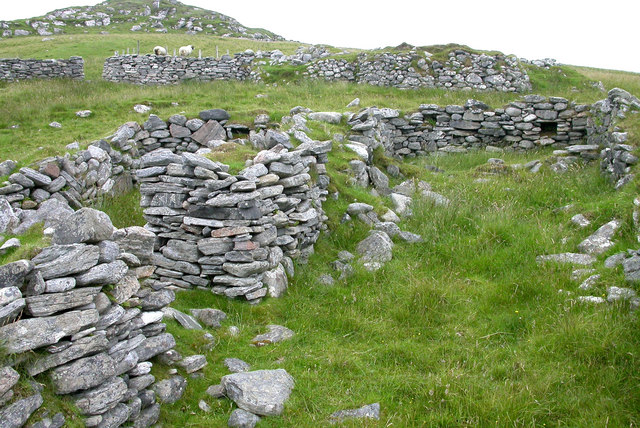
Abandoned houses on Fuaigh Mòr, which had a population of 46 prior to being cleared

The 2022 census records 101 Scottish islands as having a usually resident population, of which 96 are offshore islands. There are however various complications with both the definitions of an "island" and occasional habitation; and the National Records of Scotland have also listed a further 17 islands that were inhabited in 2001 but not in 2011, or are "included in the NRS statistical geography for inhabited islands but had no usual residents at the time of either the 2001 or 2011 censuses". There are a small number of other islands that are evidently inhabited but which are not recorded in this list. (Note: For example, South Walls is included in Hoy by the census. The evidence of maps, sources and photographs makes it clear that Eriska and Seana Bhaile have been permanently inhabited for some time. They were included in 2022 but not the censuses of 2001 or 2011. The freshwater islands of Eilean Aigas and Contin Island have been omitted from all three 21st century censuses.)

in 2011 the local government council areas with the most inhabited islands were Argyll and Bute with 23, Orkney with 20, Shetland with 16 and Highland and Comhairle nan Eilean Siar with 14 each. There were also three in North Ayrshire and one each in Fife, Perth and Kinross, Stirling and West Dunbartonshire. The last three named plus two islands in Argyll and Bute are freshwater rather than offshore.

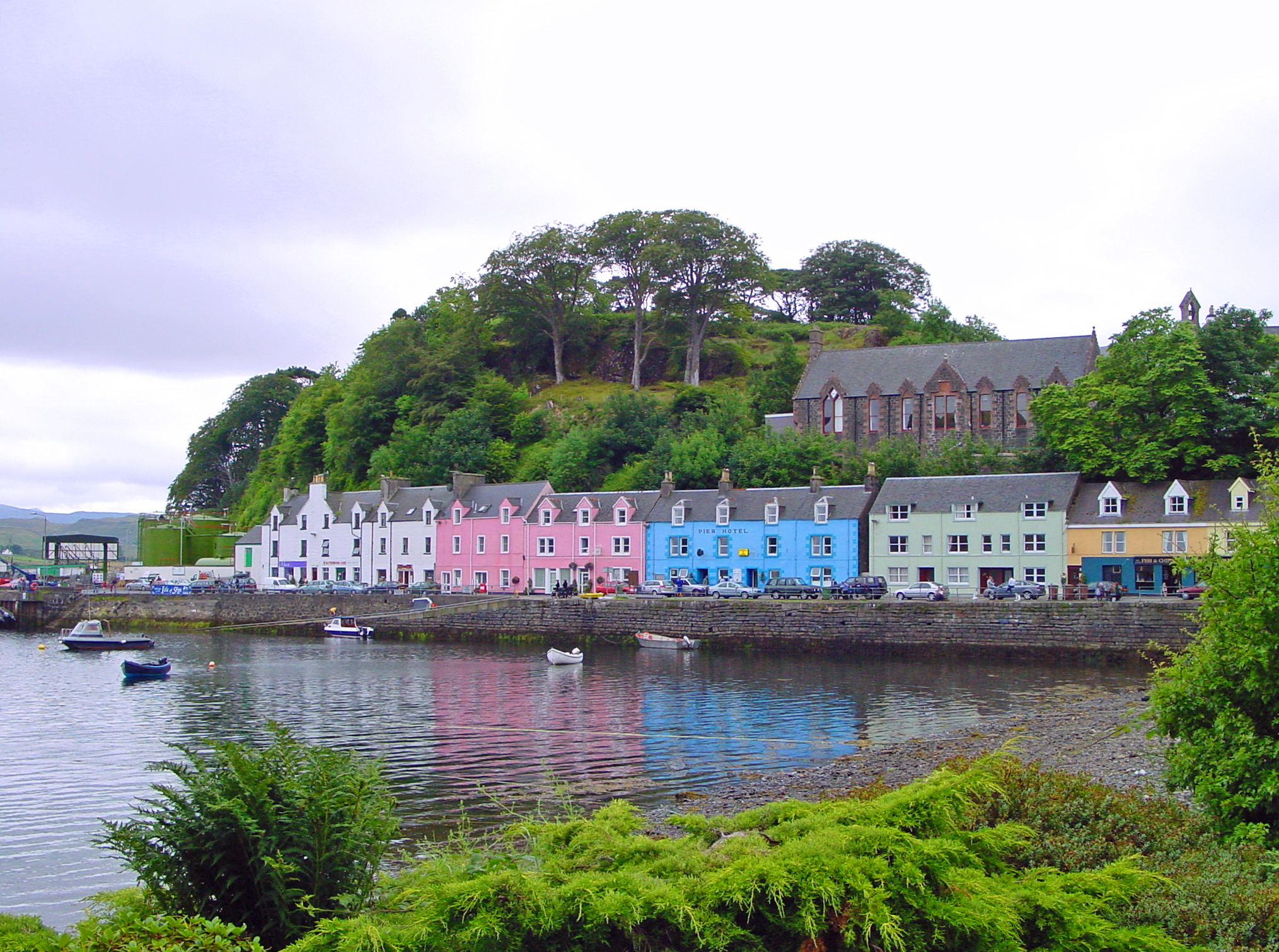
Portree on Skye, an island where the population has grown in recent decades

In the past many smaller islands that are uninhabited today had permanent populations. Losses were severe in many areas during the 19th century when islands such as Pabbay and Fuaigh Mòr were subject to forcible evictions during the Highland Clearances. Mass emigration from the Hebridean islands was at its height in the mid-19th century, but it commenced as early as the 1770s in some areas. The crofting counties held 20% of Scotland's population in 1755, but by 1961 this figure had declined to 5%. Other examples are Mingulay, Noss and the St Kilda archipelago, which were abandoned during the course of the 20th century. Declines have been particularly significant in the more remote outlying islands, some of which remain vulnerable to ongoing losses.

The following table shows population trends for the ten most populous islands as of the 2011 census. The overall trends are typically growth in populations in the early part of the modern period, followed by declines from the mid-19th century onwards. In every case except Orkney the highest population was recorded prior to 1932 and the lowest post-Industrial Revolution figure after 1960. Subsequently, there has been modest growth overall, although some islands are continuing to show a decline. Between 1991 and 2001, the population of the islands as a whole fell by 3% to 99,739, although there were 35 islands whose population increased. By contrast, between 2001 and 2011 Scottish island populations as a whole grew by 4% to 103,702. The Scottish Community Alliance noted that "the largest rate of increase has been in the Western Isles (6%) where local people now own approximately 60% of the landmass. Where populations have fallen (Bute, Arran and Islay) community ownership is virtually non-existent."

=== Largest Scottish islands by population ===
Rank	Island	Local authority	Population								
Rank	Island	Local authority	c. 1801	1841	1891	1931	1961	1981	2001	2011	2021
1	Lewis and Harris	Na h-Eileanan Siar	12,164	20,046	30,726	28,042	24,107	22,476	19,918	21,031	19,680
2	Mainland, Shetland	Shetland		20,572	19,741	15,172	13,282	17,722	17,550	18,765	18,763
3	Mainland, Orkney	Orkney		16,022	16,498	13,352	13,495	14,000	15,315	17,162	17,779
4	Skye	Highland	14,470 (in 1794)	23,082	15,705	9,908	7,479	7,276	9,232	10,008	10,496
5	Bute	Argyll and Bute	4,759 (in 1792)	7,147	11,735	12,112	9,793	7,306	7,228	6,498	6,047
6	Arran	North Ayrshire	5,804 (in 1792)	6,241	4,730	4,506	3,700	3,845	5,045	4,629	4,618
7	Islay	Argyll and Bute	9,500 (in 1792)	15,772	7,375	4,970	3,860	3,792	3,457	3,228	3,180
8	Mull	Argyll and Bute	8,016 (in 1794)	8,316	4,691	2,903	2,154	2,197	2,667	2,800	3,063
9	South Uist	Na h-Eileanan Siar		5,093	3,708	2,810	2,376	2,231	1,818	1,754	1,650
10	Great Cumbrae	North Ayrshire	509 (in 1793)	1,413	1,784	2,144	1,638	1,300	1,434	1,376	1,293
	Total			123,704	116,693	95,919	81,884	82,145	83,664	87,251	86,569
	Change				−5.7%	−7.8%	−14.6%	+0.3%	+1.8%	+4.3%	−0.8%

The following table compares the populations of the main Scottish archipelagos with that of the Faroe Islands for a similar time frame to the above. (Note: For a discussion of some of the factors involved see Coull (1967).)

Archipelago	1801	1851	1901	1931	1971	2011
Hebrides	64,690	88,615	76,780	60,390	45,480	46,632
Change		▲37%	▼13%	▼21%	▼25%	▲3%
Orkney	24,445	31,318	27,763	21,933	17,007	21,349
Change		▲28%	▼11%	▼21%	▼22%	▲26%
Shetland	22,000	31,000	28,000	21,000	17,500	23,167
Change		▲41%	▼10%	▼25%	▼17%	▲32%
Faroe Islands	5,265	8,000	15,230	24,500	38,612	48,515
Change		▲52%	▲90%	▲61%	▲58%	▲26%

== Legislation ==
In July 2013, the Scottish Government made the Lerwick Declaration, indicating an intention to decentralise power to the three island council areas of Orkney, Shetland and the Western Isles and later that year made a commitment to do so. In 2017 an Islands bill was introduced to make "island proofing" (including for uninhabited islands) a statutory requirement for public bodies. The Bill completed Stage 1 on 8 February 2018. The Islands (Scotland) Act 2018 was then duly passed.

== Larger islands ==
This is a list of Scottish islands that either have an area greater than 40 hectares (approximately 100 acres) and/or are inhabited. The main groups, from Haswell-Smith (2004), in many cases provide a more useful guide to location than local authority areas. These groups are: Firth of Clyde, Islay, Firth of Lorn, Mull, Small Isles, Skye, Lewis and Harris, Uists and Barra, St Kilda, Orkney, Shetland and Firth of Forth. In a few cases where the island is part of either a recognisable smaller group or an archipelago, or is located away from the main groups, an archipelago, local authority or other descriptive name is used instead. "F" designates a freshwater island.

Scotland's islands include thirteen Munros (mountains with a height over 3,000 feet or 914.4 metres), twelve of them found on Skye, and a total of 227 Marilyns (hills with a relative height of at least 150 metres, regardless of absolute height).

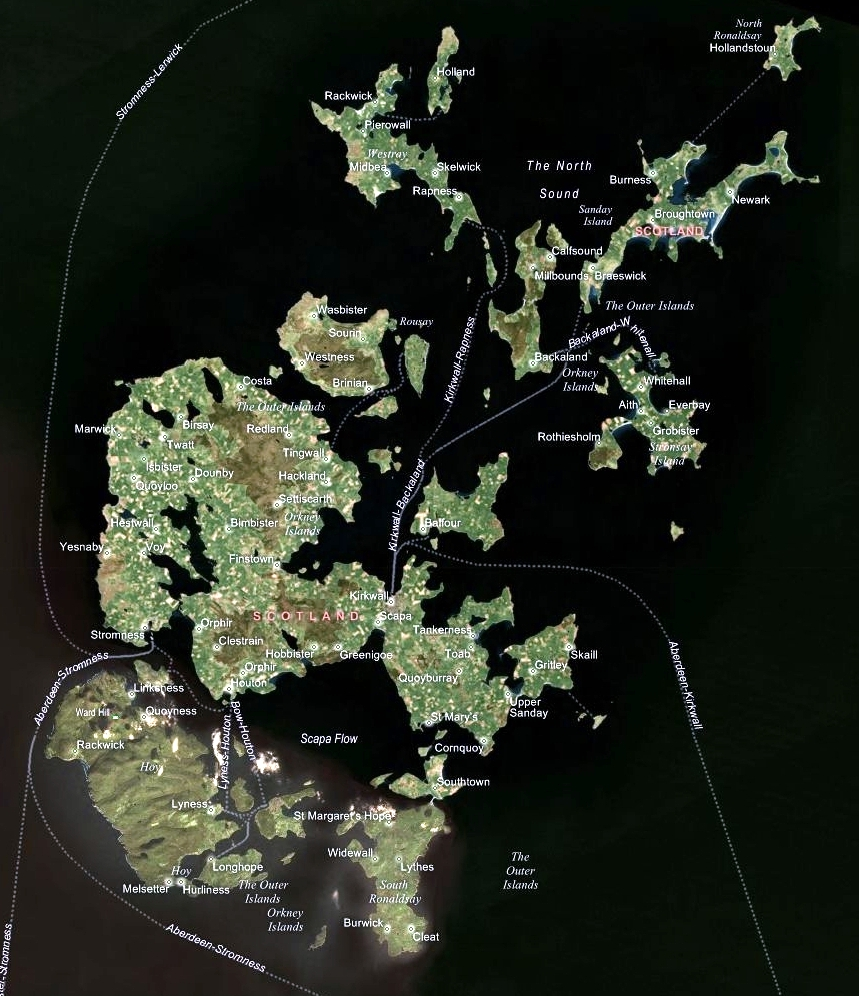
Orkney aerial photomap

The Shetland archipelago

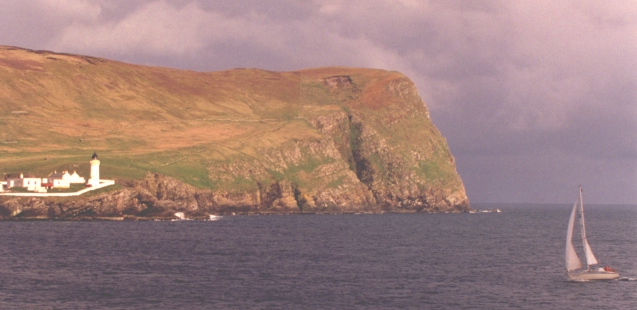
Bressay Lighthouse at Kirkabister Ness, Shetland

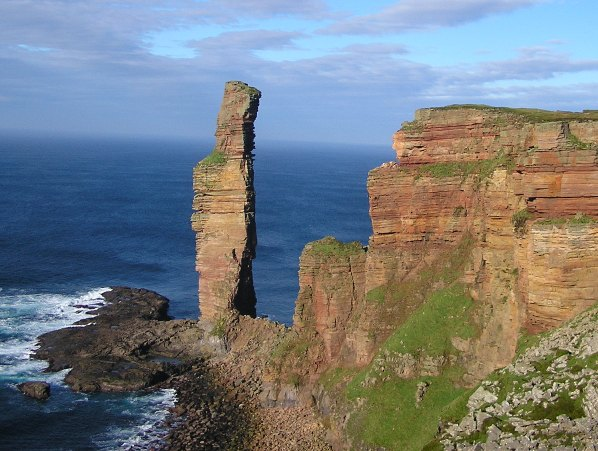
The Old Man of Hoy, Orkney, a 137-metre (450 ft) sea stack of red sandstone

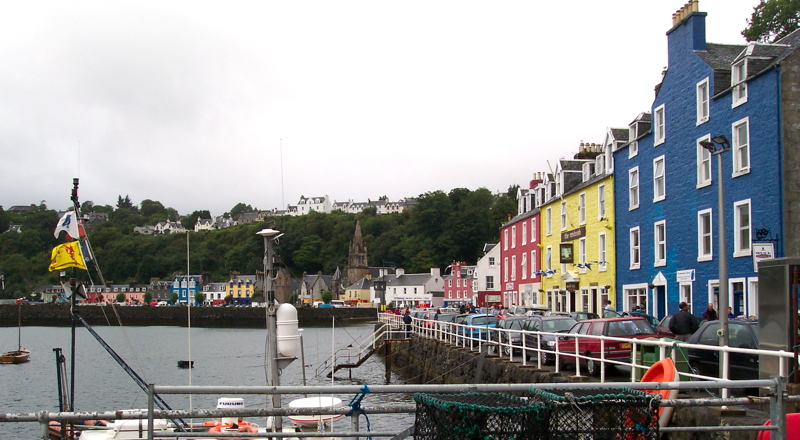
Tobermory harbour, Isle of Mull

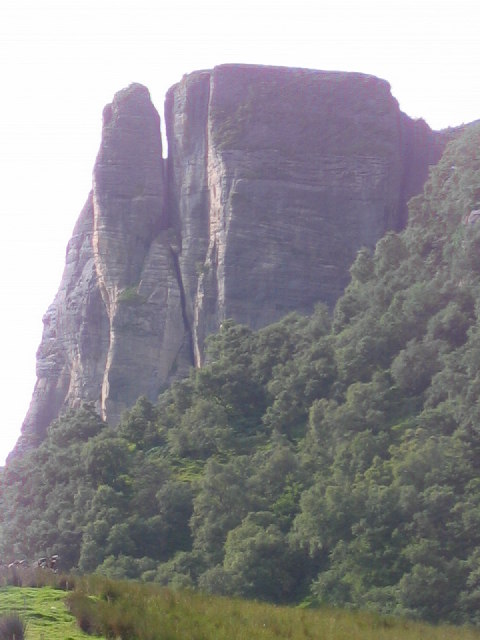
The cliffs of Creag na Bruaich, Raasay

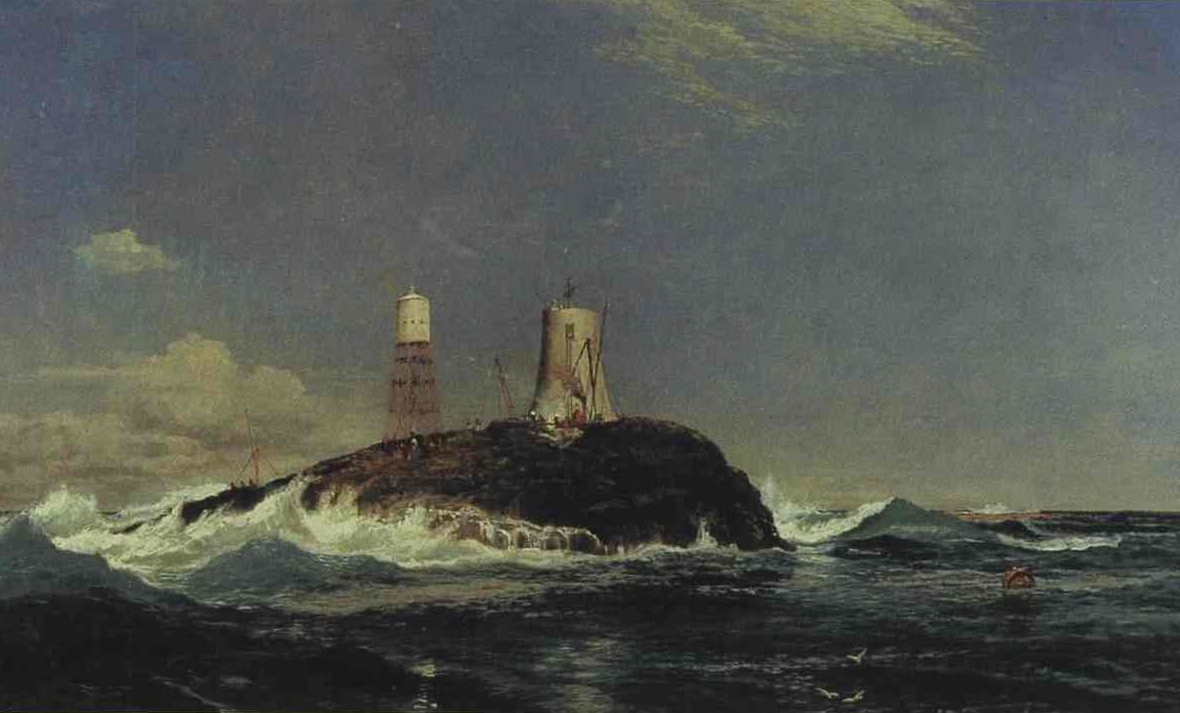
Dhu Heartach Lighthouse, During Construction by Sam Bough (1822–1878)

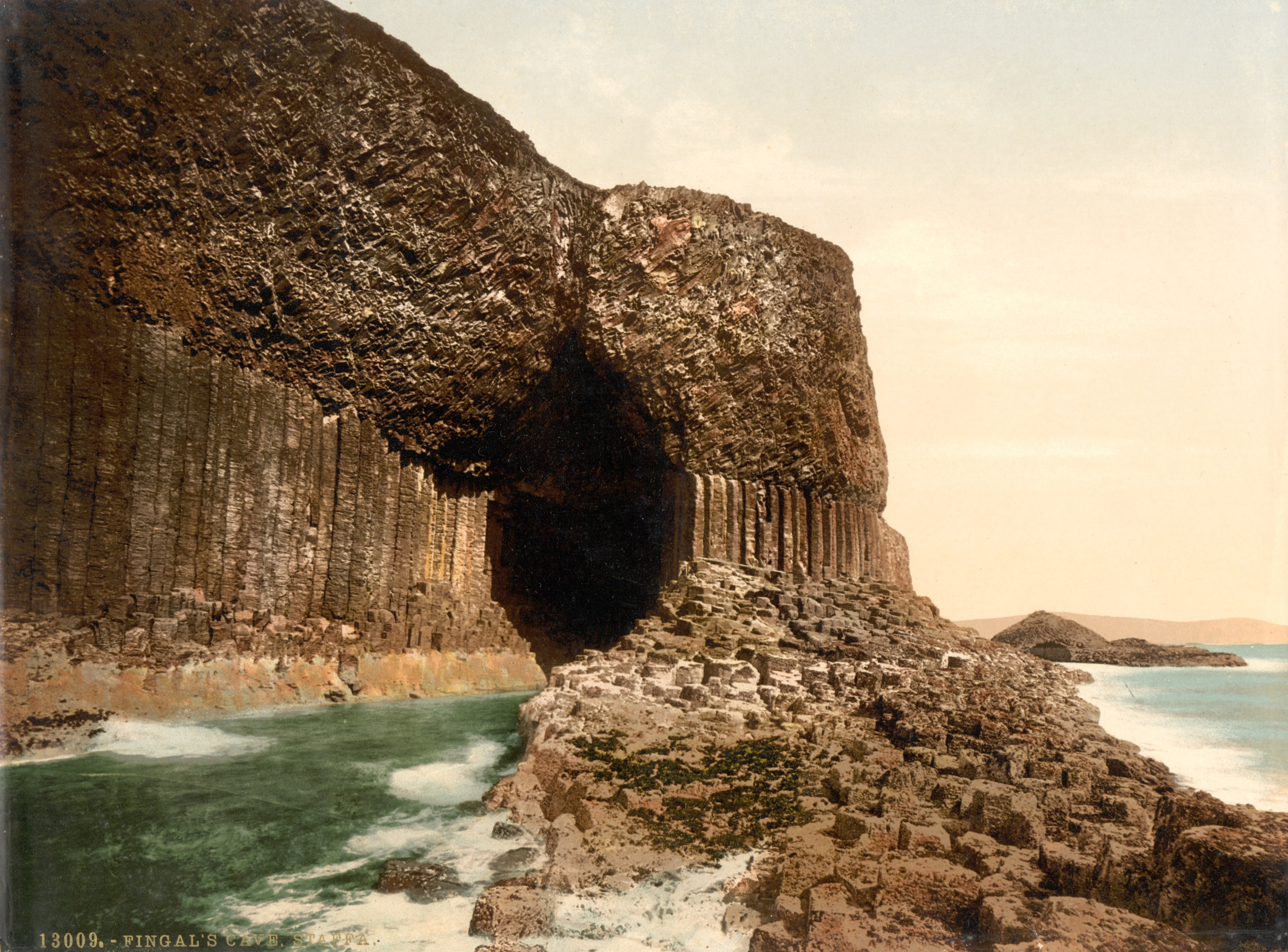
Fingal's Cave, Staffa

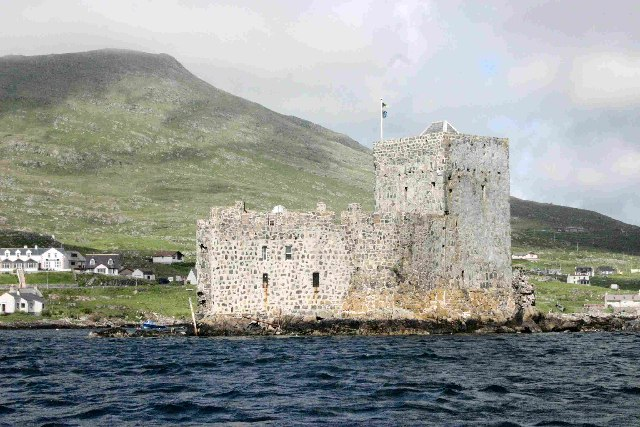
Kisimul Castle, Barra

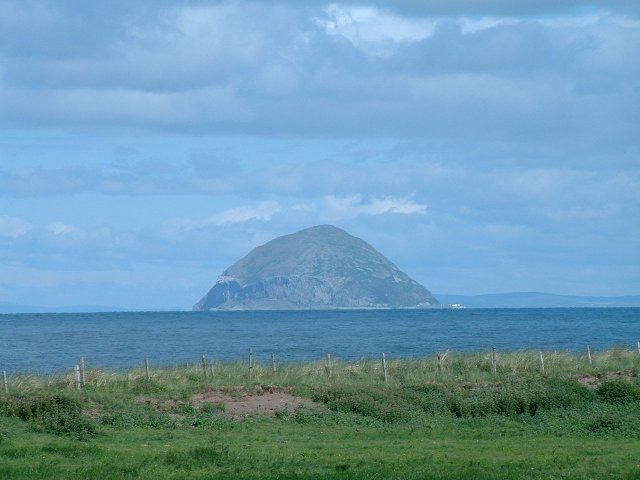
Ailsa Craig from the South Ayrshire coast

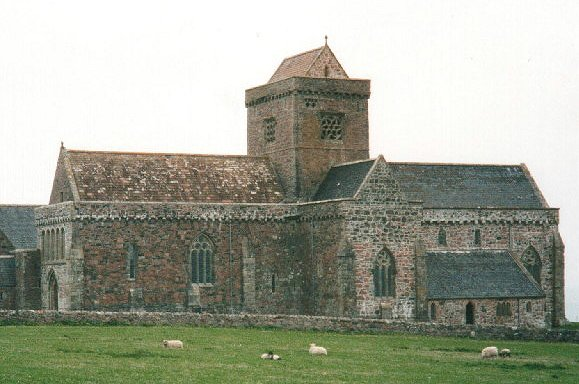
Iona Abbey

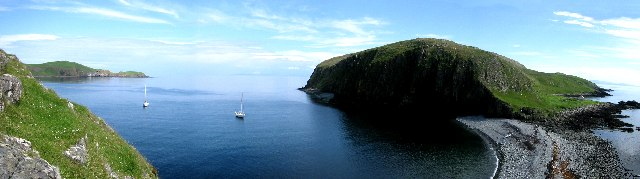
Shiant Islands

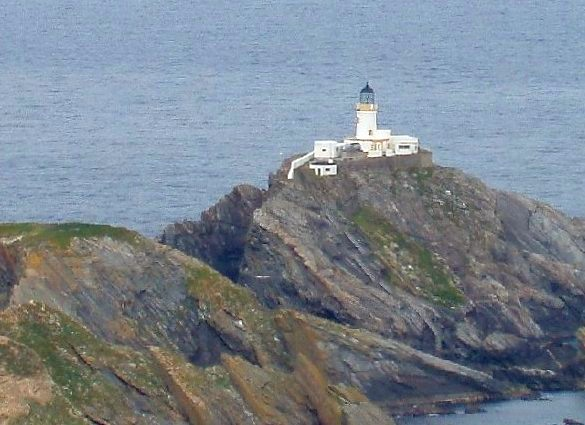
Muckle Flugga lighthouse, Shetland

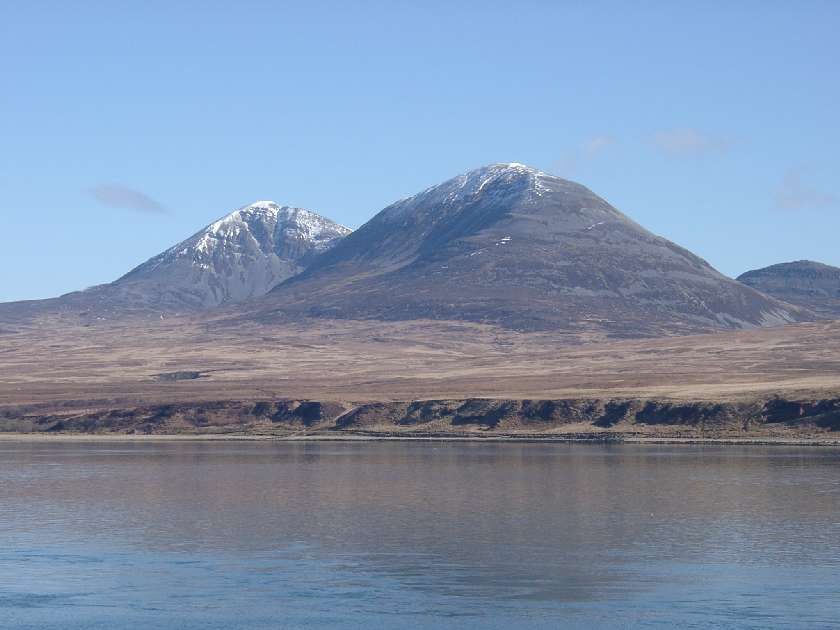
Two of the Paps of Jura. Photo by John Shaw.

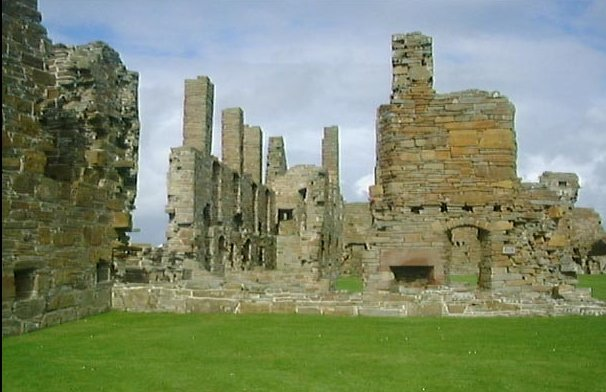
The Earl's Palace, Birsay, Orkney

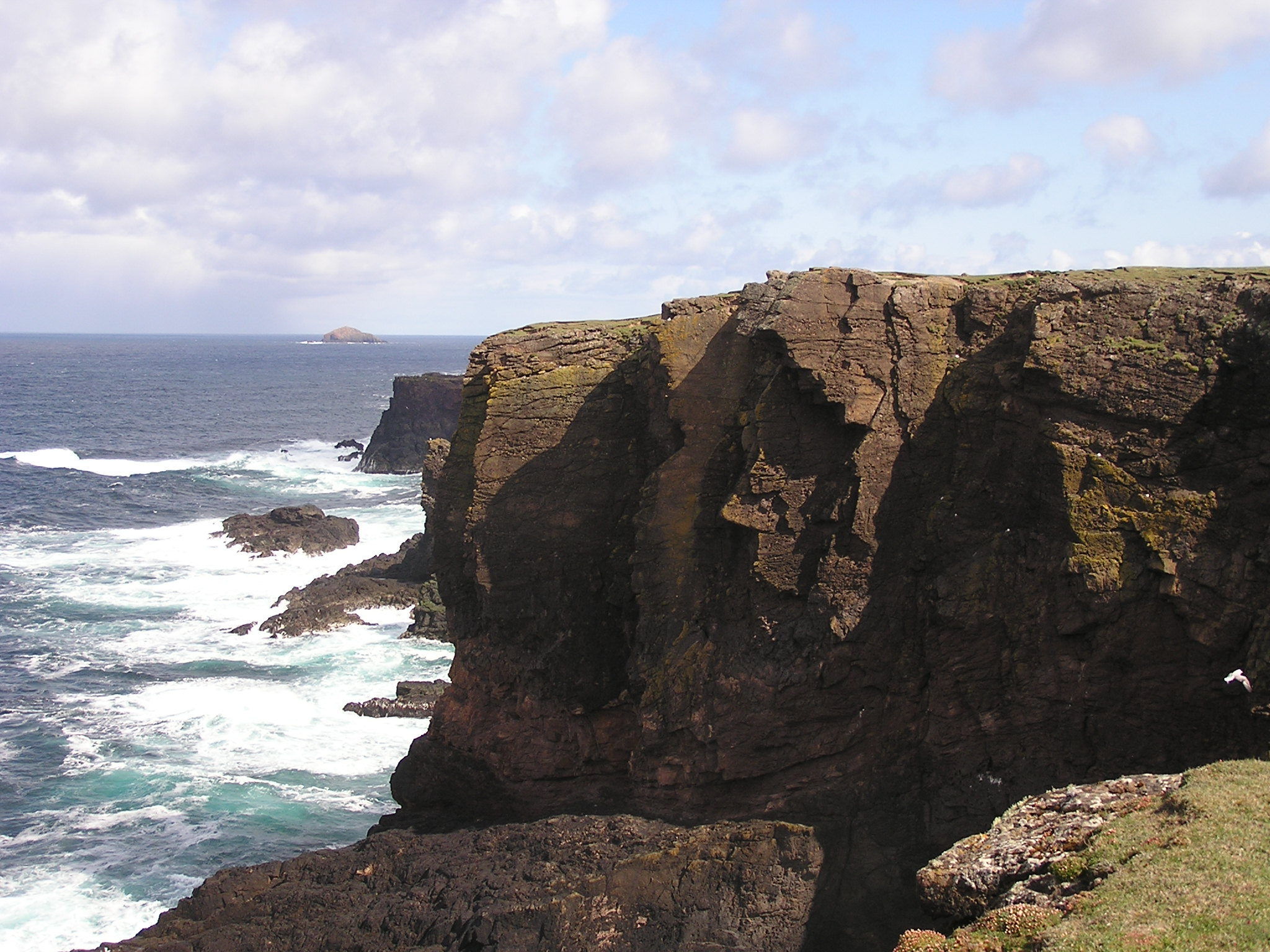
The cliffs of Eshaness, North Mainland, Shetland

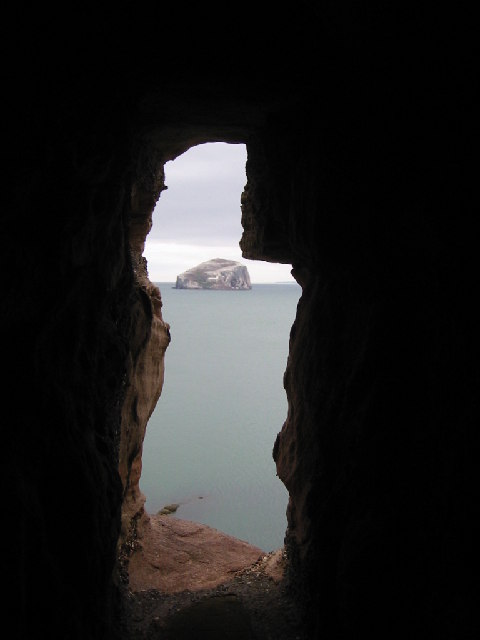
The Bass Rock from Tantallon Castle

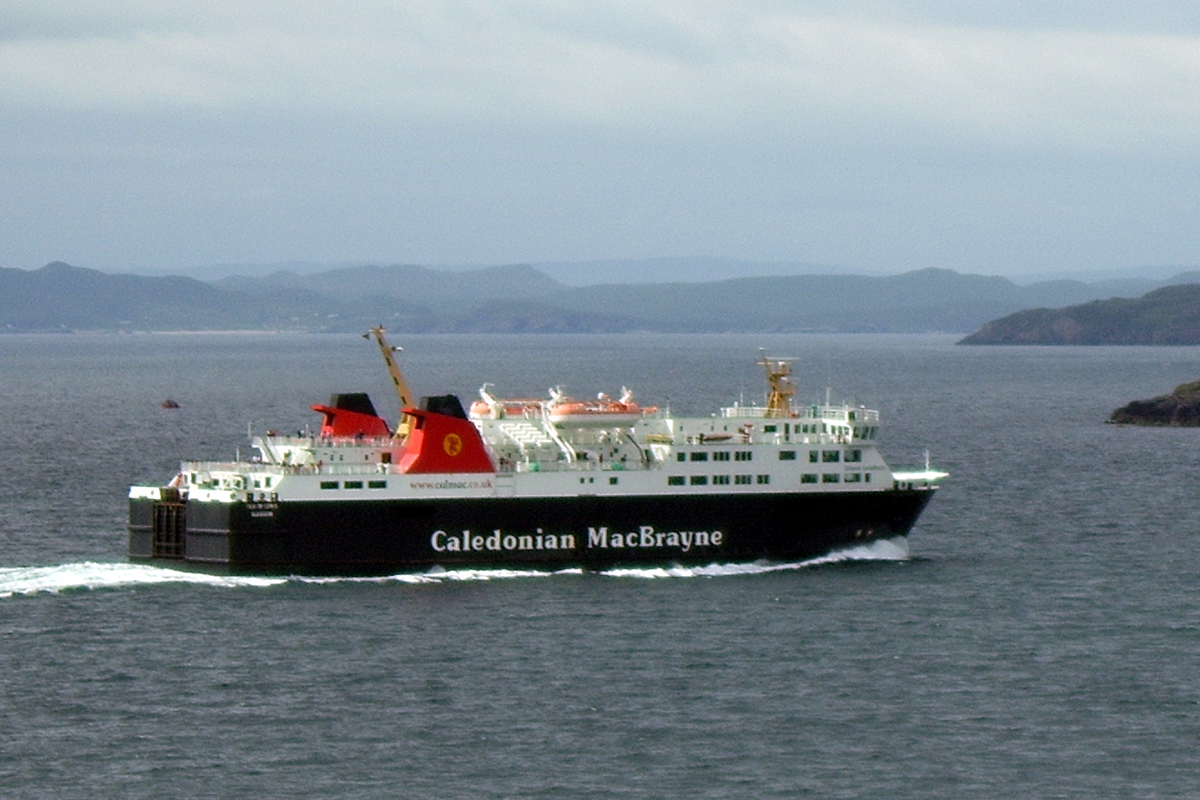
MV Isle of Lewis in The Minch

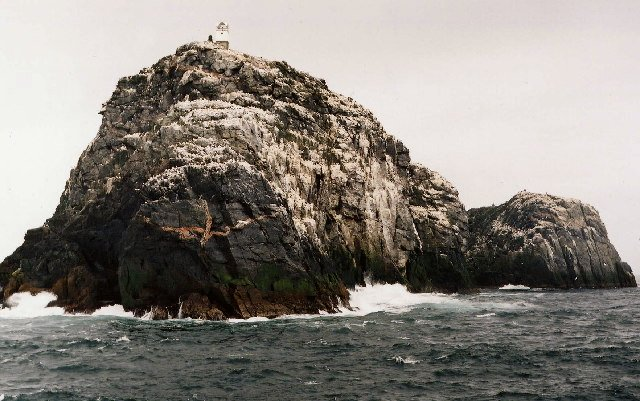
Sula Sgeir from the south west

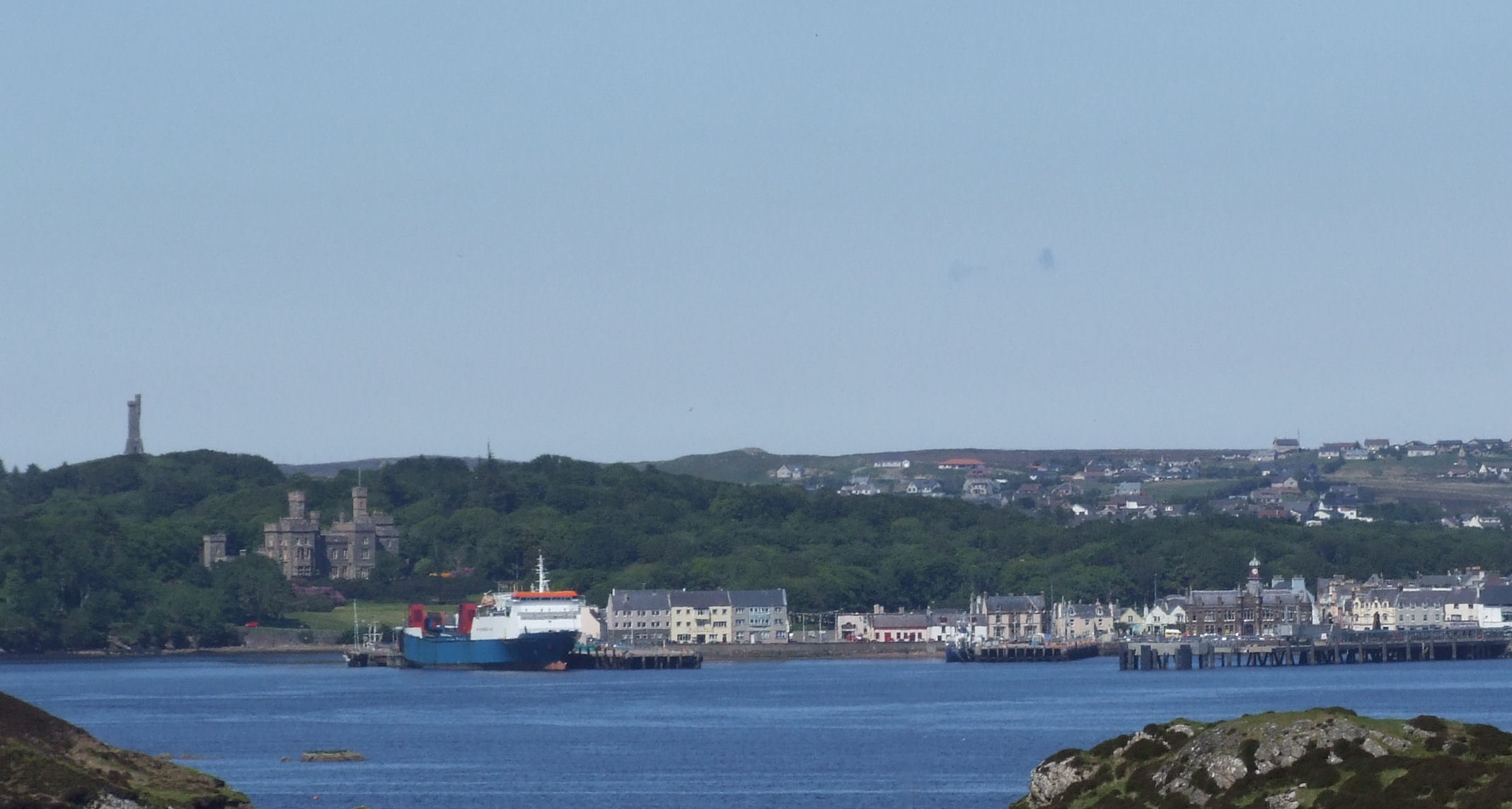
Stornoway harbour, Lewis

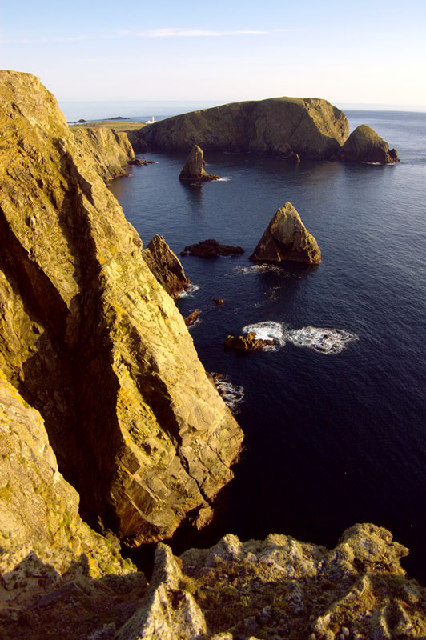
Fair Isle cliffs

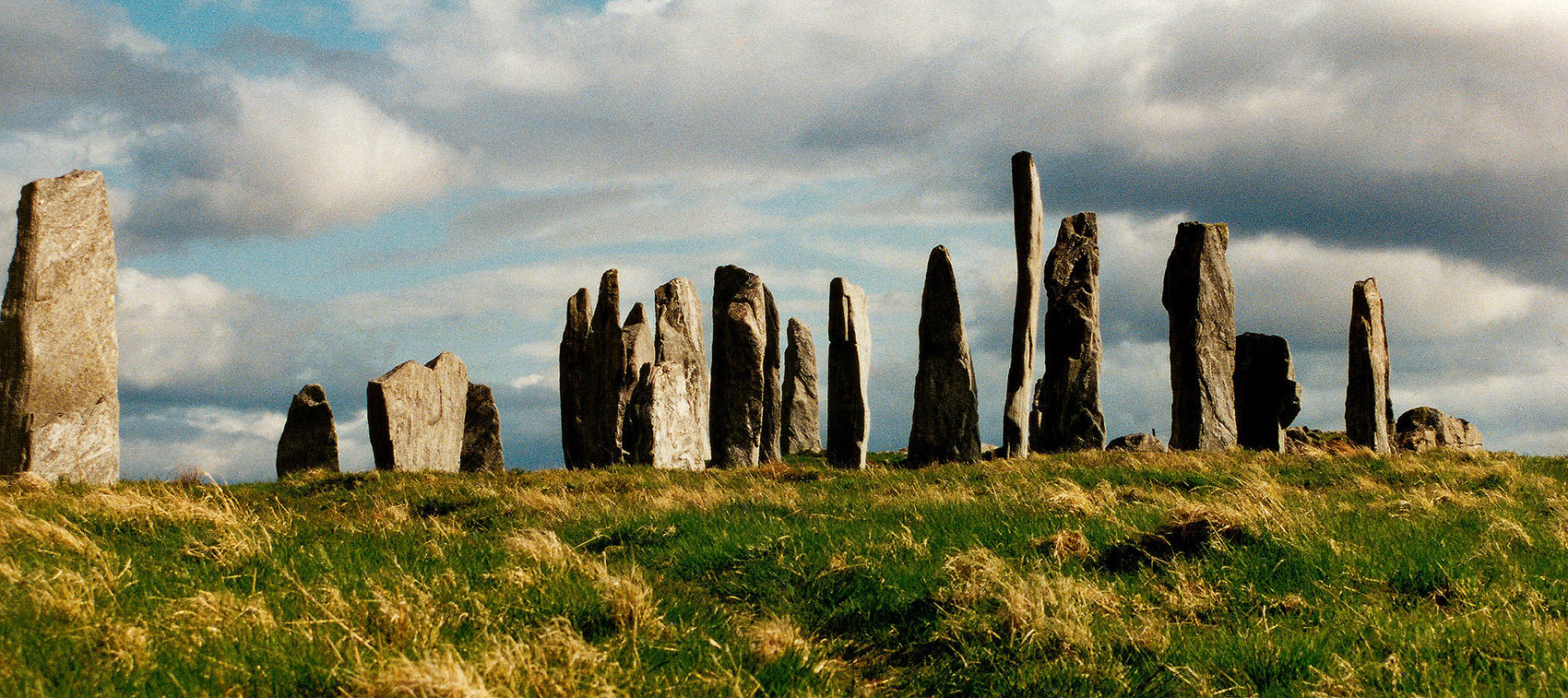
Callanish Standing Stones, Lewis

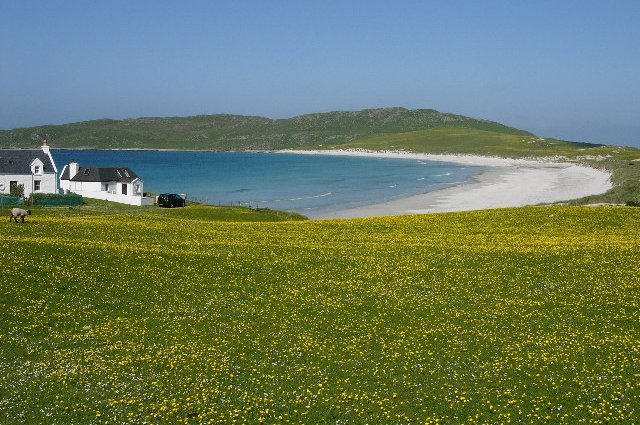
Machair at Balephuil Bay, Tiree

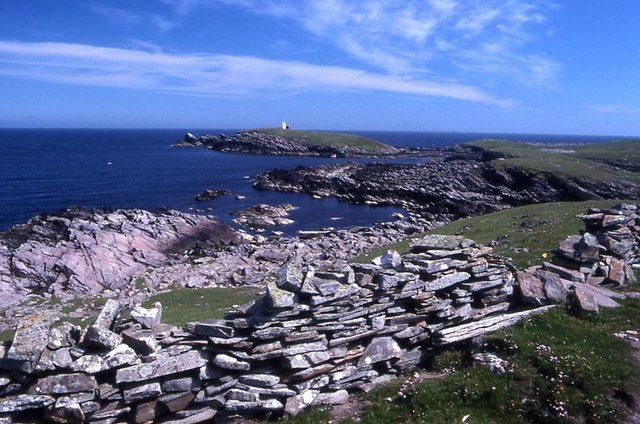
The east coast of Mousa towards the Peerie Bard

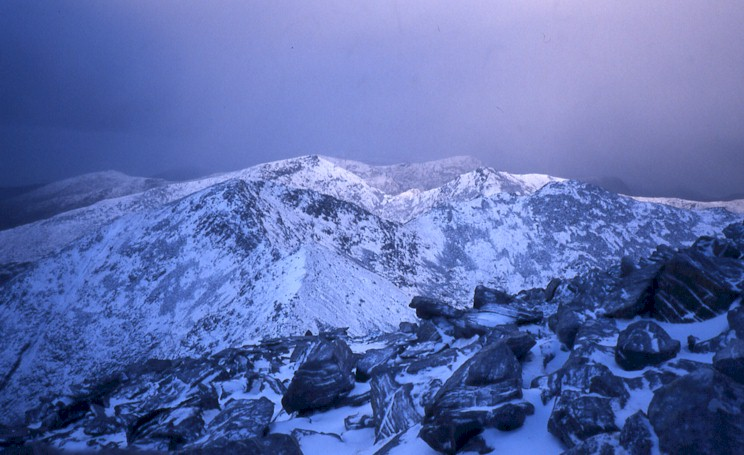
Clisham, Harris

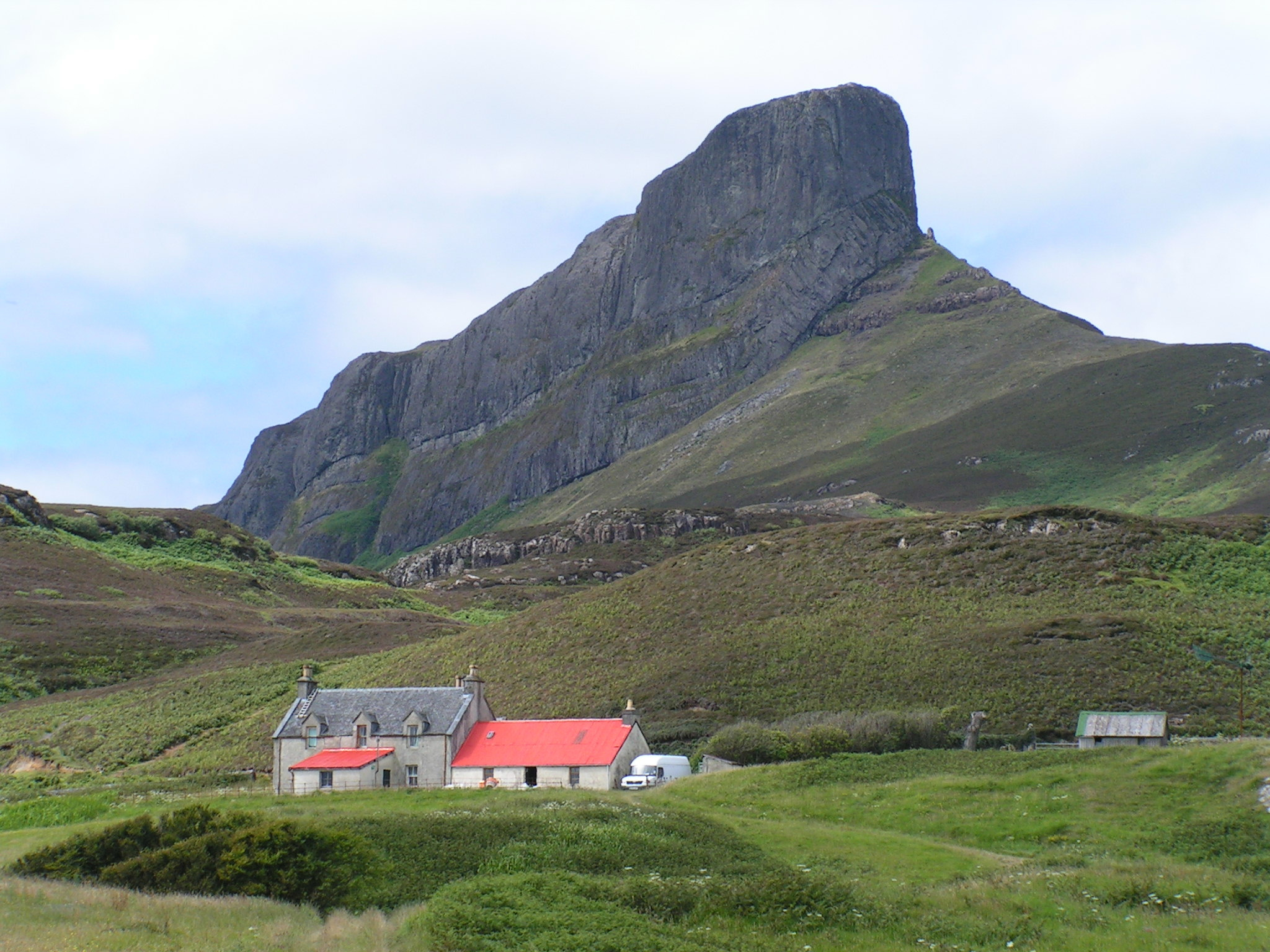
An Sgurr, Eigg

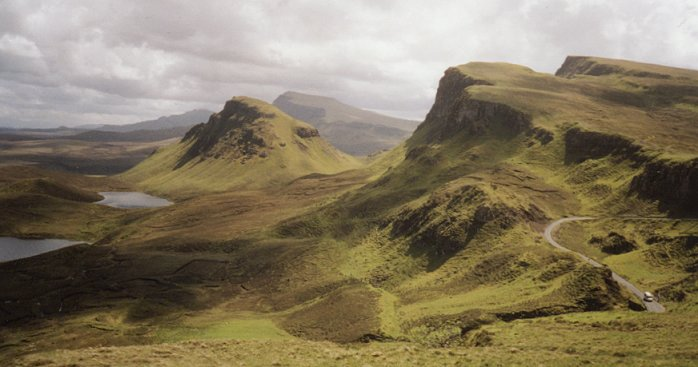
The rock pinnacles of the Quiraing, Skye

Island	Group	Area (ha) (Note: Island areas indicated with an asterisk are estimates based on Ordnance Survey maps and General Register Office for Scotland statistics.)	Population (Note: Islands classified as inhabited in the 2001 or 2011 census but not in 2022, and by implication classified as occasionally inhabited, are indicated with a degree symbol °.)	Height (m)
Ailsa Craig (Creag Ealasaid)	Firth of Clyde	99	0	338
Arran (Eilean Arainn)	Firth of Clyde	43,201	4,618	874
Auskerry	Orkney	85	2	18
Baleshare (Am Baile Sear)	Uists and Barra	910	53	12
Balta	Shetland	80	0	44
Barra (Barraigh)	Uists and Barra	5,875	1,209	383
Barra Head (Beàrnaraigh)	Uists and Barra	204	0	193
Benbecula (Beinn nam Fadhla)	Uists and Barra	8,203	1,255	124
Berneray (Beàrnaraigh)	Uists and Barra	1,010	142	93
Bigga	Shetland	78	0	34
Boreray (Boraraigh)	St Kilda	86	0	384
Boreray (Boighreigh)	Uists and Barra	204	1	56
Bressay	Shetland	2,805	345	226
Brother Isle	Shetland	40	0	25
Bruray	Out Skerries	55	16	53
Buchan Ness	Buchan coast	4 *	1	5
Burray	Orkney	903	445	80
Bute (Bòid)	Firth of Clyde	12,217	6,047	278
Calf of Eday	Orkney	243	0	54
Calbha Mòr	Edrachillis Bay	70	0	67
Calve Island	Mull	72	0	20
Canna (Canaigh)	Small Isles	1,130	9	210
Cara	Islay	66	0	56
Càrna	Mull	213	0	169
Cava	Orkney	107	0	38
Ceallasaigh Mòr	Uists and Barra	55	0	10
Ceallasaigh Beag	Uists and Barra	46	0	10
Ceann Ear	Monach Islands	203	0	17
Ceann Iar	Monach Islands	154	0	19
Coll (Cola)	Mull	7,685	176	106
Colonsay (Colbhasa)	Islay	4,074	117	143
Copinsay	Orkney	73	0	64
Danna	Islay	315 *	5	54
Davaar (Eilean Dà Bhàrr)	Firth of Clyde	52 *	0 °	115
Dunglass Island (F)	River Conon	40 *	0	8
Easdale (Eilean Èisdeal)	Slate Islands	<20 *	61	38
East Burra	Shetland	515	105	81
Eday	Orkney	2,745	102	101
Egilsay	Orkney	650	17	35
Eigg (Eige)	Small Isles	3,049	95	393
Eilean a' Ghiorr	Uists and Barra	7	1	10
Eileach an Naoimh	Garvellachs	56	0	80
Eilean Bàn	Highland	<10 *	0 °	5
Eilean Buidhe	Craobh Haven	4 *	6	9
Eilean Chaluim Chille	Lewis and Harris	85	0	43
Eilean Chearstaidh	Lewis and Harris	77	0	37
Eilean dà Mhèinn	Islay	3 *	4	16
Eilean Donan	Highland	<1 *	0 °	3
Eilean Dubh Mòr	Slate Islands	65	0	53
Eilean Fladday (Fladaigh)	Inner Hebrides	120	0	39
Eilean Leathann	Uists and Barra	6.5	1	10
Eilean Liubhaird	Lewis and Harris	125	0	76
Eilean Loain	Inner Hebrides	15 *	1	28
Eilean Macaskin (Eilean MhicAsgain)	Islay	50	0	65
Eilean Meadhonach	Crowlin Islands	77	0	54
Eilean Mhealasta	Lewis and Harris	124	0	77
Eilean Mhic Chrion	Islay	54 *	0	63
Eilean Mòr	Crowlin Islands	170	0	114
Eilean Mòr (F)	Lewis	59 *	0	64
Eilean nan Ròn	Highland	138	0	76
Eilean Righ	Islay	86	0	55
Eilean Shona (Eilean Seòna)	Small Isles	525	9	265
Eilean Sùbhainn (F)	Loch Maree	118 *	0	36
Eilean Tigh	Skye	54	0	111
Eilean Tioram	Highland	2 *	5	10
Eilean Trodday (Tròndaigh)	Skye	42	0	45
Eileanan Iasgaich	Uists and Barra	50	0	23
Ensay (Easaigh)	Uists and Barra	186	0	49
Eorsa	Mull	122	0	98
Eriska (Aoraisge)	Loch Linnhe	310 *	21	47
Eriskay (Èirisgeigh)	Uists and Barra	703	158	185
Erraid (Eilean Earraid)	Mull	187	6	75
Eynhallow	Orkney	75	0	30
Fair Isle	Shetland	768	44	217
Fara	Orkney	295	0	43
Faray	Orkney	180	0	32
Fetlar	Shetland	4,078	66	158
Fiaraidh	Uists and Barra	41	0	30
Flodaigh	Uists and Barra	145 *	4	20
Flodaigh Mòr	Uists and Barra	58	0	28
Flodday, Sound of Barra	Uists and Barra	40	0	41
Flotta	Orkney	876	77	58
Foula	Shetland	1,265	17	418
Fuaigh Mòr	Lewis and Harris	84	0	67
Fuday (Fùideigh)	Uists and Barra	232	0	89
Fuiay (Fùidheigh)	Uists and Barra	84	0	107
Gairsay	Orkney	240	6	102
Garbh Eileach	Garvellachs	142	0	110
Garbh Eilean	Shiant Islands	143	0	160
Garbh Eilean, Loch Maree (F)	Loch Maree	65 *	0	25
Gigha (Giogha)	Islay	1,395	187	100
Gighay (Gioghaigh)	Uists and Barra	96	0	95
Glimps Holm	Orkney	55	0	32
Gometra (Gòmastra)	Mull	425	7	155
Graemsay	Orkney	409	21	62
Great Bernera (Beàrnaraigh Mòr)	Lewis and Harris	2,122	212	87
Great Cumbrae (Cumaradh Mòr)	Firth of Clyde	1,168	1,293	127
Grimsay (Griomasaigh)	Uists and Barra	833	149	22
Grimsay (South) (Griomasaigh)	Uists and Barra	117 *	27	20
Gruinard Island (Eilean Ghruinneard)	Highland	196	0	106
Gunna (Gunnaigh)	Mull	69	0	35
Handa (Eilean Shannda)	Highland	309	0	123
Hascosay	Shetland	275	0	30
Hellisay (Theiliseigh)	Uists and Barra	142	0	79
Hermetray (Thearmatraigh)	Uists and Barra	72	0	35
Hildasay	Shetland	108	0	32
Hirta (Hiort)	St Kilda	670	0	430
Holm of Grimbister	Orkney	16	2	8
Holy Island (Eilean MoLaise)	Firth of Clyde	253	17	314
Horse Island	Summer Isles	53	0	60
Housay	Out Skerries	163	21	53
Hoy	Orkney	13,458	392	481
Hunda	Orkney	100	0	41
Inchcailloch (Innis nan Cailleach) (F)	Loch Lomond	50	0	85
Inchcolm (Innis Choluim)	Firth of Forth	9 *	0 °	34
Inchfad (Innis Fhada) (F)	Loch Lomond	c.40 *	1	24
Inch Kenneth (Innis Choinnich)	Mull	55	0	49
Inchlonaig (F)	Loch Lomond	80	0	62
Inchmarnock (Innis Mheàrnaig)	Firth of Clyde	266	0	60
Inchmurrin (Innis Mheadhrain) (F)	Loch Lomond	120	10	89
Inchtavannach (Innis Taigh a' Mhanaich) (F)	Loch Lomond	70	3	84
Inner Holm	Orkney	2 *	1	7
Innis Chonain (F)	Loch Awe	8 *	2	62
Iona (Ì Chaluim Chille)	Mull	877	178	100
Isay (Ìosaigh)	Skye	60	0	28
Islay (Ìle)	Islay	61,956	3,180	491
Isle Martin (Eilean Mhàrtainn)	Summer Isles	157	0	120
Isle of Ewe (Eilean Iùbh)	Highland	309	7	72
Isle of May (Eilean Mhàigh)	Firth of Forth	45	0	50
Isle Ristol (Eilean Ruisteil)	Summer Isles	225 *	0	71
Jura (Diùra)	Islay	36,692	258	785
Kerrera (Cearrara)	Firth of Lorne	1,214	61	189
Killegray (Ceileagraigh)	Lewis and Harris	176	1	45
Kirkibost (Eilean Chirceboist)	Uists and Barra	205	0	7
Lamba	Shetland	43	0	35
Lamb Holm	Orkney	40	0	20
Lewis and Harris (Leòdhas agus na Hearadh)	Lewis and Harris	217,898	19,680	799
Linga, Muckle Roe	Shetland	70	0	69
Linga, Yell	Shetland	45	0	26
Linga Holm	Orkney	57	0	10
Lismore (Lios Mòr)	Loch Linnhe	2,351	190	127
Little Bernera (Beàrnaraigh Beag)	Lewis and Harris	138	0	41
Little Colonsay (Colbhasa Beag)	Mull	88	0	61
Little Cumbrae (Cumaradh Beag)	Firth of Clyde	313	0	123
Longa Island (Longa)	Highland	126	0	70
Longay (Longaigh)	Skye	50	0	67
Luing (Luinn)	Slate Islands	1,430	178	94
Lunga	Slate Islands	254	2	98
Lunga	Treshnish Isles	81	0	103
Mainland, Orkney	Orkney	52,325	17,779	271
Mainland, Shetland	Shetland	96,879	18,763	450
Mingulay (Miughalaigh)	Uists and Barra	640	0	273
Moncreiffe Island (Eilean Mhon Craoibhe) [F]	River Tay	46 *	1	5
Mousa	Shetland	180	0	55
Muck (Eilean nam Muc)	Small Isles	559	28	137
Muckle Roe	Shetland	1,773	130	267
Muldoanich (Maol Dòmhnaich)	Uists and Barra	78	0	153
Mull (Muile)	Mull	87,535	3,063	966
North Rona (Rònaigh)	Atlantic Outlier	109	0	108
North Ronaldsay	Orkney	690	59	20
North Uist (Uibhist a Tuath)	Uists and Barra	30,305	1,254	347
Isle of Noss	Shetland	343	0	181
Oldany Island	Highland	200 *	0	104
Oronsay (Orasa)	Islay	543	7	93
Oronsay (Orasaigh)	Uists and Barra	85	0	25
Oronsay (Orasaigh)	Mull	230 *	0	58
Oxna	Shetland	68	0	38
Pabay (Pabaigh)	Skye	122	0	28
Pabay Mòr (Pabaigh Mòr)	Lewis and Harris	101	0	68
Pabbay (Pabaigh)	Uists and Barra	250	0	171
Pabbay (Pabaigh)	Lewis and Harris	820	0	196
Papa	Shetland	59	0	32
Papa Little	Shetland	226	0	82
Papa Stour	Shetland	828	7	87
Papa Stronsay	Orkney	74	9	13
Papa Westray	Orkney	918	95	48
Priest Island (Eilean a' Chlèirich)	Summer Isles	122	0	78
Raasay (Ratharsair)	Skye	6,405	187	443
Ronay (Rònaigh)	Uists and Barra	563	0	115
Rousay	Orkney	4,860	236	250
Rùm	Small Isles	10,463	31	812
Samphrey	Shetland	66	0	29
Sanda Island (Àbhainn)	Firth of Clyde	151	0 °	123
Sanday (Sanndaigh)	Orkney	5,043	491	65
Sanday (Sanndaigh)	Small Isles	184	4	59
Sandray (Sanndraigh)	Uists and Barra	385	0	207
Scalpay (Sgalpaigh)	Skye	2,483	0 °	392
Scalpay (Sgalpaigh)	Lewis and Harris	653	282	104
Scarba (Sgarba)	Islay	1,474	0	449
Scarp (An Sgarp)	Lewis and Harris	1,045	0	308
Seaforth Island (Eilean Shìphoirt)	Lewis and Harris	273	0	217
Seana Bhaile	Uists and Barra	55	15	11
Seil (Saoil)	Slate Islands	1,329	580	146
Sgeotasaigh	Lewis and Harris	49	0	57
Shapinsay	Orkney	2,948	299	64
Shillay (Siolaigh)	Lewis and Harris	47	0	79
Shuna (Siuna)	Slate Islands	451	2	90
Shuna (Siuna)	Loch Linnhe	155	0	71
Skye (An t-Eilean Sgitheanach)	Skye	165,625	10,496	993
Soay (Sòdhaigh)	Skye	1,036	3	141
Soay (Soaigh)	St Kilda	99	0	378
Soay Mòr (Sòdhaigh Mòr)	Lewis and Harris	45	0	37
South Havra	Shetland	59	0	42
South Rona (Rònaigh)	Skye	930	2	125
South Ronaldsay	Orkney	4,980	984	118
South Uist (Uibhist a Deas)	Uists and Barra	32,026	1,650	620
South Walls	Orkney	1,100	-	57
Stockinish Island (Eilean Stocainis)	Lewis and Harris	49	0	44
Stroma (Sròmaigh)	Highland	375	0	53
Stromay (Sròmaigh)	Uists and Barra	66	0	16
Stronsay	Orkney	3,275	321	44
Stuley (Stadhlaigh)	Uists and Barra	45	0	40
Switha	Orkney	41	0	29
Swona	Orkney	92	0	41
Tahay (Tathaigh)	Uists and Barra	53	0	65
Tanera Beag (Tannara Beag)	Summer Isles	66	0	83
Tanera Mòr (Tannara Mòr)	Summer Isles	310	0 °	124
Taransay (Tarasaigh)	Lewis and Harris	1,475	0	267
Texa	Islay	48	0	48
Tiree (Tiriodh)	Mull	7,834	700	141
Torsa	Slate Islands	113	0	62
Trondra	Shetland	275	152	60
Ulva (Ulbha)	Mull	1,990	6	313
Unst	Shetland	12,068	644	284
Uyea, Unst	Shetland	205	0	50
Vaila	Shetland	327	3	95
Vacsay (Bhacasaigh)	Lewis and Harris	41	0	34
Vallay (Bhàlaigh)	Uists and Barra	260	0	38
Vatersay (Bhatarsaigh)	Uists and Barra	960	83	185
Vementry	Shetland	370	0	90
West Burra	Shetland	743	772	217
West Linga	Shetland	125	0	52
Westray	Orkney	4,713	566	169
Whalsay	Shetland	1,970	1,005	119
Wiay (Fùidheigh)	Skye	148	0	60
Wiay (Fùidheigh)	Uists and Barra	375	0	102
Wyre	Orkney	311	8	32
Yell	Shetland	21,211	904	205

Four islands were recorded as inhabited in 2011 that were not mentioned in the 2001 census: Eilean dà Mhèinn, Eilean Tioram, Holm of Grimbister and Inner Holm.

These following are listed by the National Records of Scotland as "included in the NRS statistical geography for inhabited islands but had no usual residents at the time of either the 2001 or 2011 censuses." None except Lamb Holm are greater than 40 ha in area.

Island	Location
Castle Stalker (Eilean an Stalcaire)	Firth of Lorn
Eilean Horrisdale (Eilean Thòrathasdail)	Gair Loch
Eilean Loain	Loch Sween
Eilean na Cille	Uists and Barra
Ensay	Lewis and Harris
Inch Kenneth (Innis Choinnich)	Mull
Inchlonaig (Innis Lònaig) [F]	Loch Lomond
Inchcruin (Innis Cruinn) [F] (Note: Referred to by the National Records of Scotland (2013) as "Inchruin", which is presumably a typographical error.)	Loch Lomond
Kisimul Castle (Caisteal Chiosmuil)	Uists and Barra
Lamb Holm	Orkney

== Freshwater islands ==
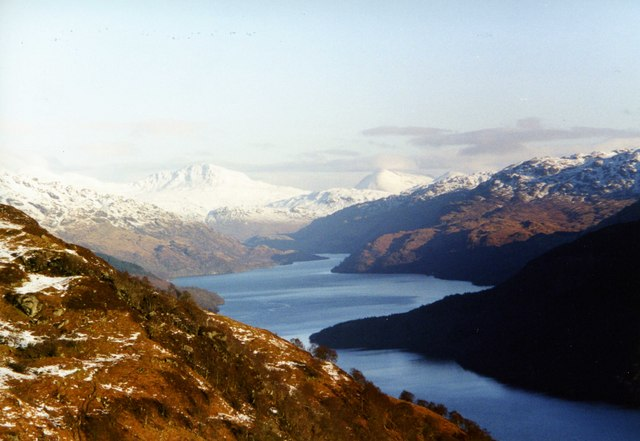
Loch Lomond from Beinn Dubh and Creag an t-Seilich

There are numerous other freshwater islands, of which the more notable include Lochindorb Castle Island, Loch Leven Castle Island, St Serf's Inch, and Inchmahome, each of which have played an important part in Scottish history.

Inchmurrin is the largest freshwater island in the British Isles. It is in Loch Lomond, which contains over sixty other islands. Loch Maree also contains several islands, the largest of which are Eilean Sùbhainn, Garbh Eilean and Eilean Ruairidh Mòr but aren't as big as others.

== Smaller offshore islands ==
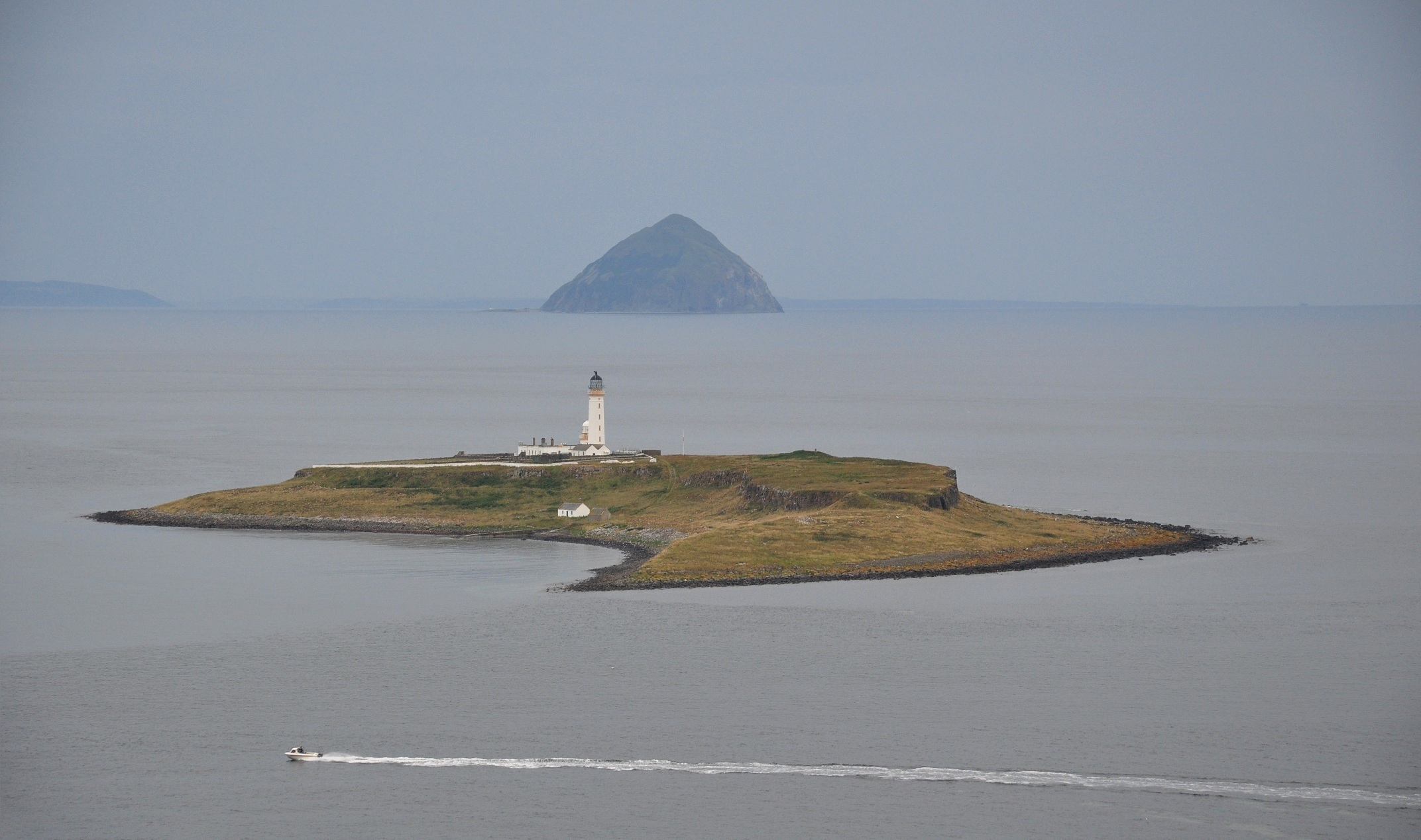
Pladda

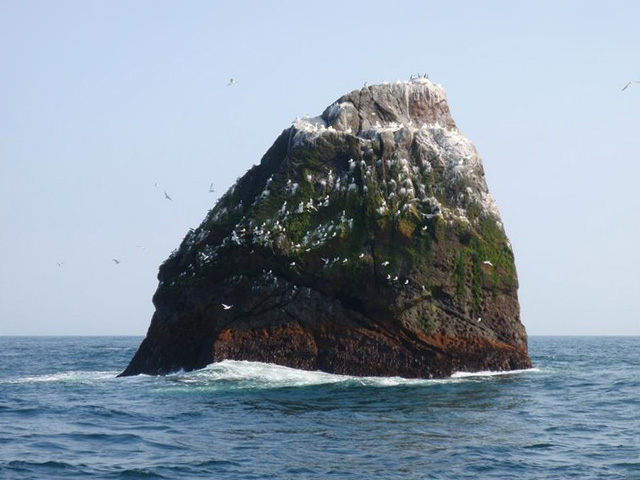
Rockall

This is a continuing list of uninhabited Scottish islands smaller than 40 hectares in size.

Name	Island group / location
Bac Mòr	Inner Hebrides: Treshnish Isles
Bass Rock	Firth of Forth
Bayble Island	Outer Hebrides: Lewis and Harris
Bearasaigh	Outer Hebrides: Lewis: Loch Ròg
Belnahua	Inner Hebrides: Slate Islands
Bottle Island	Summer Isles
Brough of Birsay	Orkney
Bound Skerry	Shetland
Cairn na Burgh Beag	Inner Hebrides: Treshnish Isles
Cairn na Burgh Mòr	Inner Hebrides: Treshnish Isles
Calbha Beag	Sutherland: Edrachillis Bay
Calf of Flotta	Orkney
Calvay	Outer Hebrides: South Uist
Campaigh	Outer Hebrides: Lewis: Loch Ròg
Castle Island	Firth of Clyde
Clett	Highland
Corn Holm	Orkney
Craigleith	Firth of Forth
Craiglethy	Kincardineshire: Fowlsheugh
Cramond Island	Firth of Forth
Damsay	Orkney
Dore Holm	Shetland
Dubh Artach	Inner Hebrides
Dùn	St Kilda
Dùn Chonnuill	Inner Hebrides: Garvellachs
East Linga	Shetland
Eilean Chathastail	Inner Hebrides: Small Isles
Eilean Dubh	Firth of Clyde
Eilean Ighe	Inner Hebrides: Arisaig
Eilean Mhuire	Outer Hebrides: Shiant Islands
Eilean Mòr, Loch Dunvegan	Skye
Eyebroughy	Firth of Forth
Fidra	Firth of Forth
Fish Holm	Shetland
Fladda	Inner Hebrides: Slate Islands
Fladda	Treshnish Isles
Flodday near Vatersay	Outer Hebrides: Barra Islands
Fuaigh Beag (Vuia Beg)	Outer Hebrides: Lewis: Loch Ròg
Gasker	Outer Hebrides: Harris
Garbh Sgeir	Inner Hebrides: Small Isles
Gigalum Island	Inner Hebrides: Gigha
Gloup Holm	Shetland
Glunimore Island	Firth of Clyde
Grunay	Shetland: Out Skerries
Gruney	Shetland
Gualan	Outer Hebrides: Benbecula
Haaf Gruney	Shetland
Harlosh Island	Inner Hebrides: Skye
Haskeir	Outer Hebrides
Haskeir Eagach	Outer Hebrides
Hearnish	Outer Hebrides: Monach Islands
Helliar Holm	Orkney
Hestan Island	Solway Firth
Holm of Faray	Orkney
Holm of Huip	Orkney
Holm of Papa	Orkney
Holm of Scockness	Orkney
Horse Isle	Firth of Clyde
Huney	Shetland
Inchgarvie	Firth of Forth
Inchkeith	Firth of Forth
Inchmickery	Firth of Forth
Innis Mhòr	Easter Ross
Kili Holm	Orkney
Lady's Holm	Shetland
Lady Isle	Firth of Clyde
Lamb	Firth of Forth
Little Linga	Shetland
Little Roe	Shetland
Linga, Samphrey	Shetland
Lingeigh	Outer Hebrides: Barra Islands
Lunna Holm	Shetland
Maiden Island	Inner Hebrides: Oban Bay
Mingay	Inner Hebrides: Skye
Muckle Flugga	Shetland
Muckle Green Holm	Orkney
Muckle Skerry	Pentland Skerries
Mugdrum Island	Firth of Tay
Nave Island	Inner Hebrides: Islay
North Havra	Shetland
Oigh-Sgeir	Inner Hebrides
Orfasay	Shetland
Ornsay	Inner Hebrides: Skye
Orsay	Inner Hebrides: Islay
Out Stack	Shetland
Pladda	Firth of Clyde
Rockall	North Atlantic
Rough Island	Solway Firth
Rusk Holm	Orkney
Rysa Little	Orkney
Scaravay	Outer Hebrides: Sound of Harris
Sgat Mòr and Sgat Beag	Firth of Clyde
Sheep Island	Firth of Clyde
Sibhinis	Outer Hebrides: Monach Islands
Shillay	Outer Hebrides: Monach Islands
Soay Beag	Outer Hebrides: Harris
South Isle of Gletness	Shetland
St Ninian's Isle	Shetland
Stac an Armin	St Kilda
Stac Biorach	St Kilda
Stac Lee	St Kilda
Stac Levenish	St Kilda
Staffa	Inner Hebrides
Stockay	Outer Hebrides: Monach Islands
Stuley	Outer Hebrides: South Uist
Sula Sgeir	North Atlantic
Sule Skerry	North Atlantic
Sule Stack	North Atlantic
Sweyn Holm	Orkney
Tarner Island	Inner Hebrides: Skye
Texa	Inner Hebrides: Islay
Trialabreac	Outer Hebrides
Urie Lingey	Shetland
Uyea, Northmavine	Shetland
Uynarey	Shetland
Vacsay	Outer Hebrides: Lewis: Loch Ròg

== Small archipelagos ==
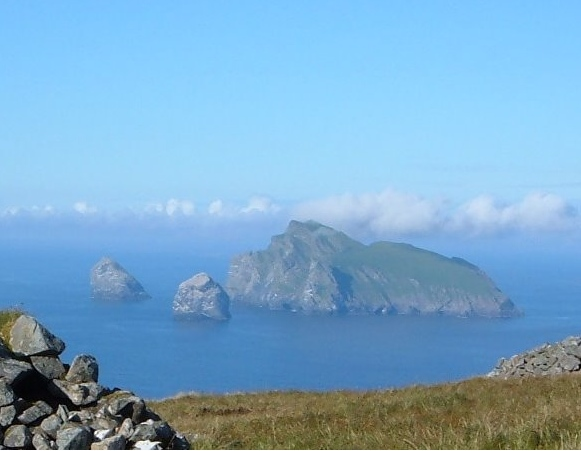
Boreray, Stac Lee, and Stac an Armin (left) from the heights of Conachair, St Kilda

There are various small archipelagos which may be better known than the larger islands they contain. These include:

Name	Island group / location
Ascrib Islands	Skye
Burnt Islands	Firth of Clyde
Crowlin Islands	Skye
Flannan Isles	Lewis and Harris
Islands of Fleet	Solway Firth (Wigtown Bay)
Garvellachs	Firth of Lorn
MacCormaig Islands	Islay
Monach Islands	Uists
Out Skerries	Shetland
Pentland Skerries	Orkney
Rabbit Islands (Eileanan nan Gall)	Highland (N Sutherland)
Ramna Stacks	Shetland
Scalloway Isles	Shetland
Shiant Islands	Lewis and Harris
Slate Islands	Firth of Lorn
St Kilda	Lewis and Harris
Summer Isles	Inner Hebrides
Treshnish Isles	Mull

== Former islands ==
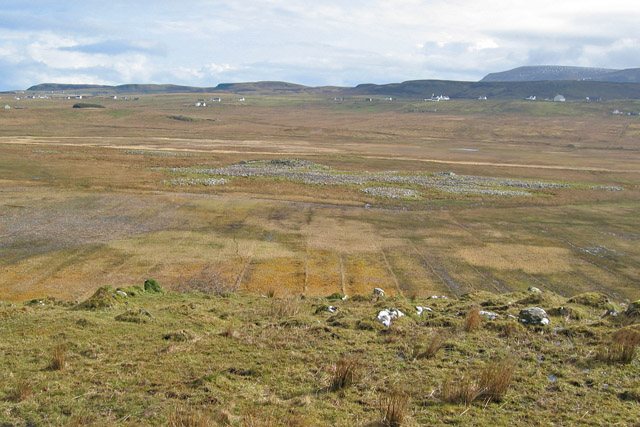
Ruined ecclesiastical buildings remain visible on Eilean Chaluim Chille, near Kilmuir, Skye

The following is a list of places which were formerly islands, but which are no longer so due to silting up, harbour building etc.

- Ardeer Peninsula, North Ayrshire
- Bodinbo Island near to Erskine on the River Clyde is now partly joined to the river bank.
- Broch of Clickimin is a former island in Loch of Clickimin, Lerwick, in Shetland. Originally an offshore island, the loch became cut off from the sea around 200 BC and the island is now connected to dry land by a permanent causeway.
- Bunglan was once a separate island, but is now connected to Samphrey by two tombolos.
- Eilean-a-beithich was once one of the Slate Islands and located in Easdale Sound. However, it was quarried to a depth of 76 metres (249 ft) below sea level leaving only the outer rim of the island. This was eventually breached by the sea and little visible sign of the island now remains.
- Eilean Chaluim Chille is a former island near Kilmuir on Skye in a now drained loch that was associated with the 13th century Hebridean lord Páll, son of Bálki.
- Inchbroach, also known as Rossie Island, is now part of Montrose harbour.
- Inch of Culter is a former island in the River Dee near Maryculter.
- Innis Bheag or Paterson Island near Portmahomack in Easter Ross is now permanently attached to the Morrich More due to shifting sands.
- Keith Inch (not to be confused with Inchkeith), is now part of Peterhead Harbour, and is the easternmost point of mainland Scotland.
- King's Inch on which stood Inch Castle.
- Milton Island or Green Inch was an island in the Clyde's estuarine waters close to the old ford across the river at Dumbuck near Dumbarton.
- Newshot Island or Newshot Isle was an island of circa 50 acres or 20 hectares lying in the River Clyde close to Park Quay, Renfrewshire, Scotland. It is now partly joined to the river bank.
- North Inch, one of the "Inches" in Perth, formerly an island in the River Tay.
- Preston Island, an artificial construction south of Low Valleyfield, has now been fully reclaimed, using ash slurry from Longannet power station.
- Rosyth Castle also stands on what was once a tidal island in the Firth of Forth, now surrounded by reclaimed land.
- Sand Inch was a small island in the River Clyde next to King's Inch
- Scalp na Caoraich, Cridhe An Uisge, Rònach and Scalp Phàdraig Mhòir - four small islands at the delta of the River Ness in Inverness which were removed in the 19th century.
- Scottle Holm was an islet north of Lerwick, Shetland. It has since become part of an industrial estate.
- White Inch, now Whiteinch an area of Glasgow.

== Bridged islands ==
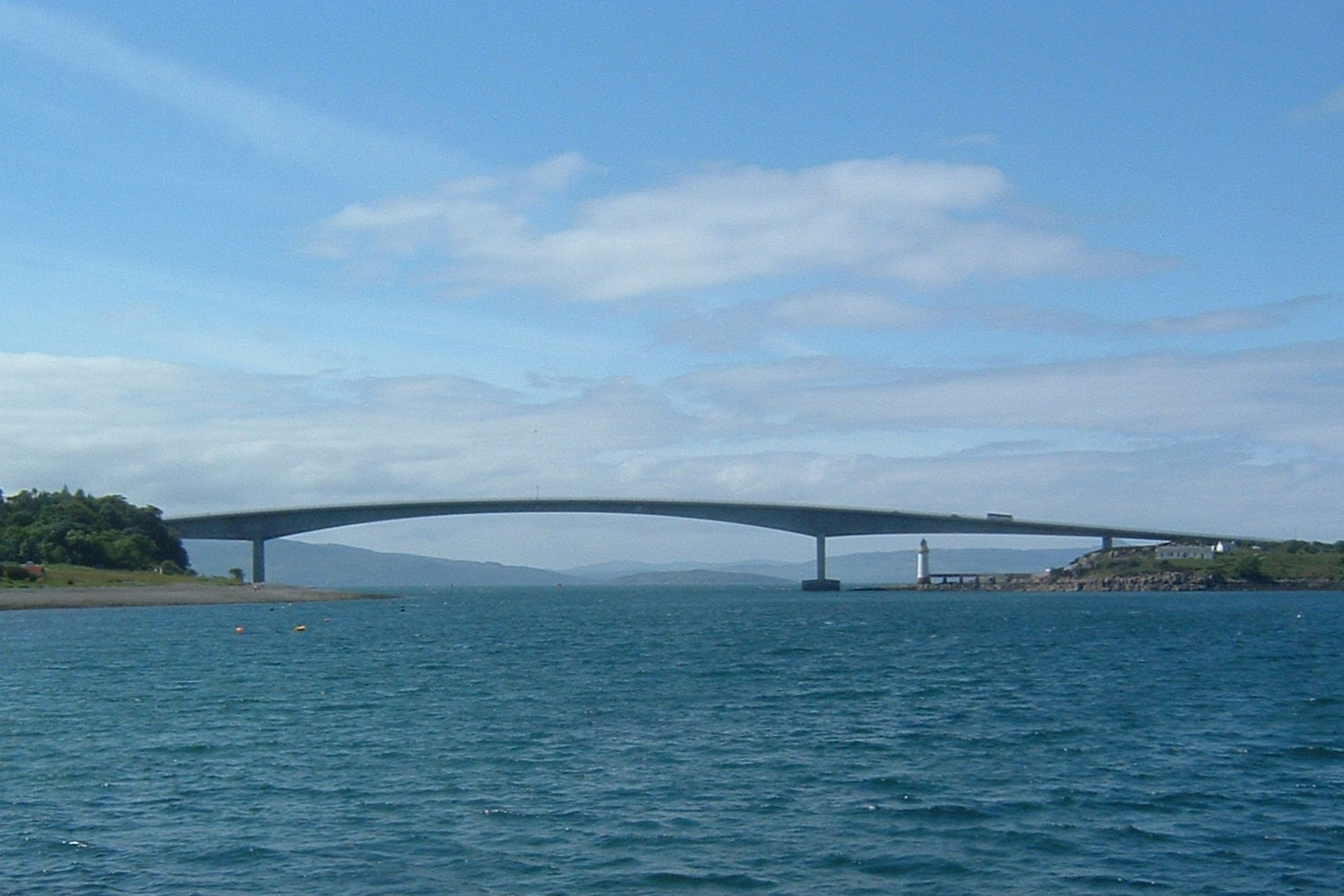
Skye Bridge, Isle of Skye

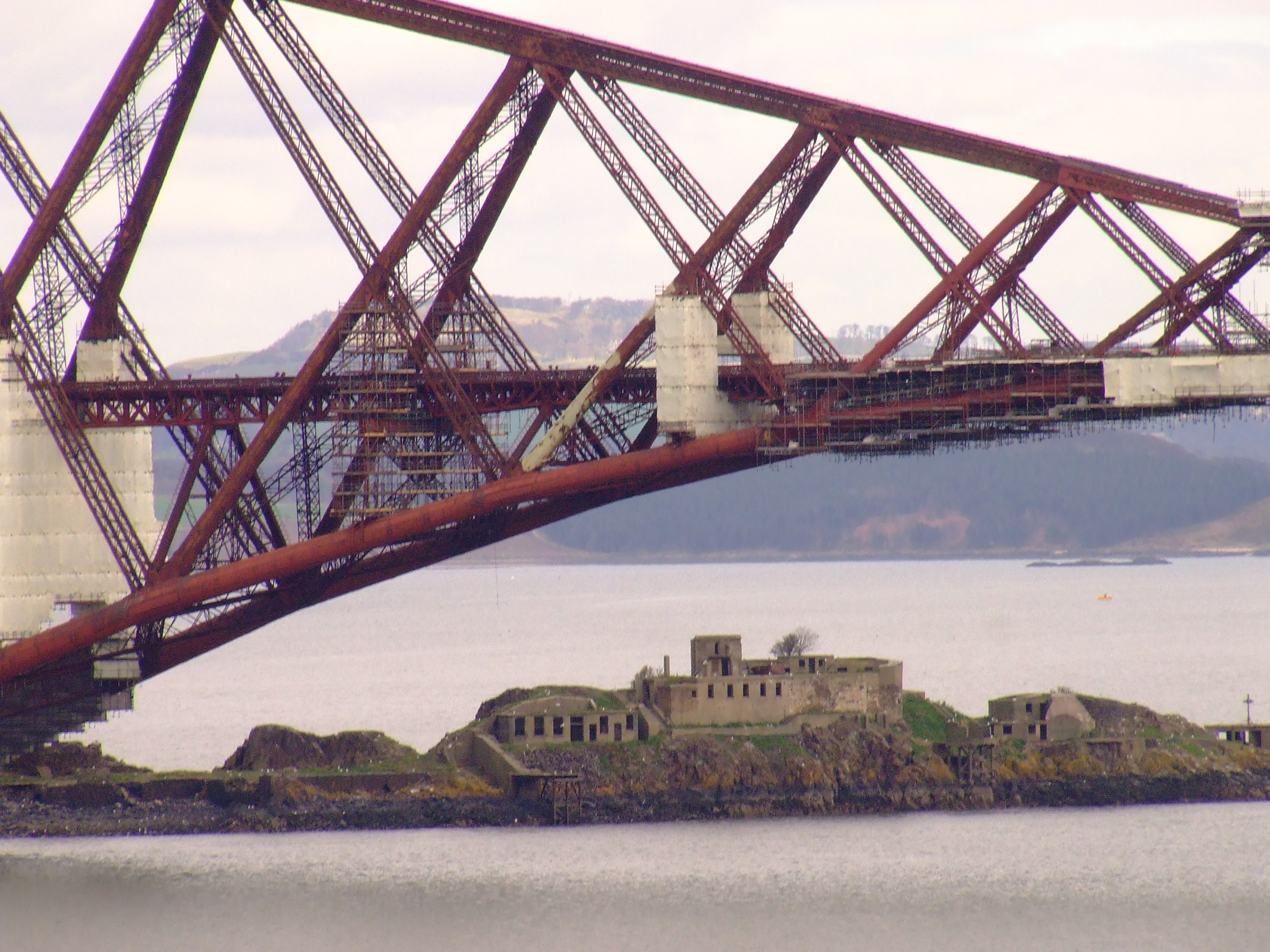
Inchgarvie can be seen just below the Forth Bridge.

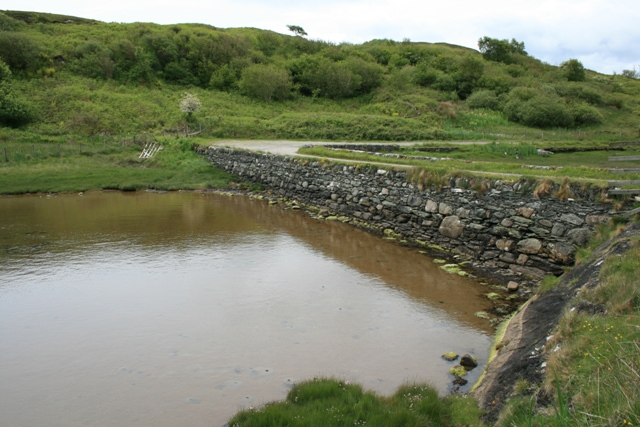
The stone causeway to Danna

Many of Scotland's islands are connected to the mainland and/or other islands by bridge or causeway. Although some people consider them no longer to be islands, they are generally treated as such.

Outer Hebrides

Many of the islands of the southern Outer Hebrides have been joined to other islands by causeways and bridges. These include:

- Baleshare
- Benbecula
- Berneray
- Eriskay
- Grimsay
- North Uist
- South Uist
- Vatersay, which is connected to Barra (but not to the above islands), by the Vatersay Causeway.

To the north, Scalpay and Great Bernera are connected to Lewis and Harris.

Inner Hebrides

- Skye is connected to the mainland by the Skye Bridge which now incorporates Eilean Bàn.
- Eilean Donan by causeway to the mainland
- Eriska by causeway to the mainland
- Seil (to mainland) via John Stevenson's 1792 "Bridge over The Atlantic".
- Danna by causeway to the mainland

Orkney Islands

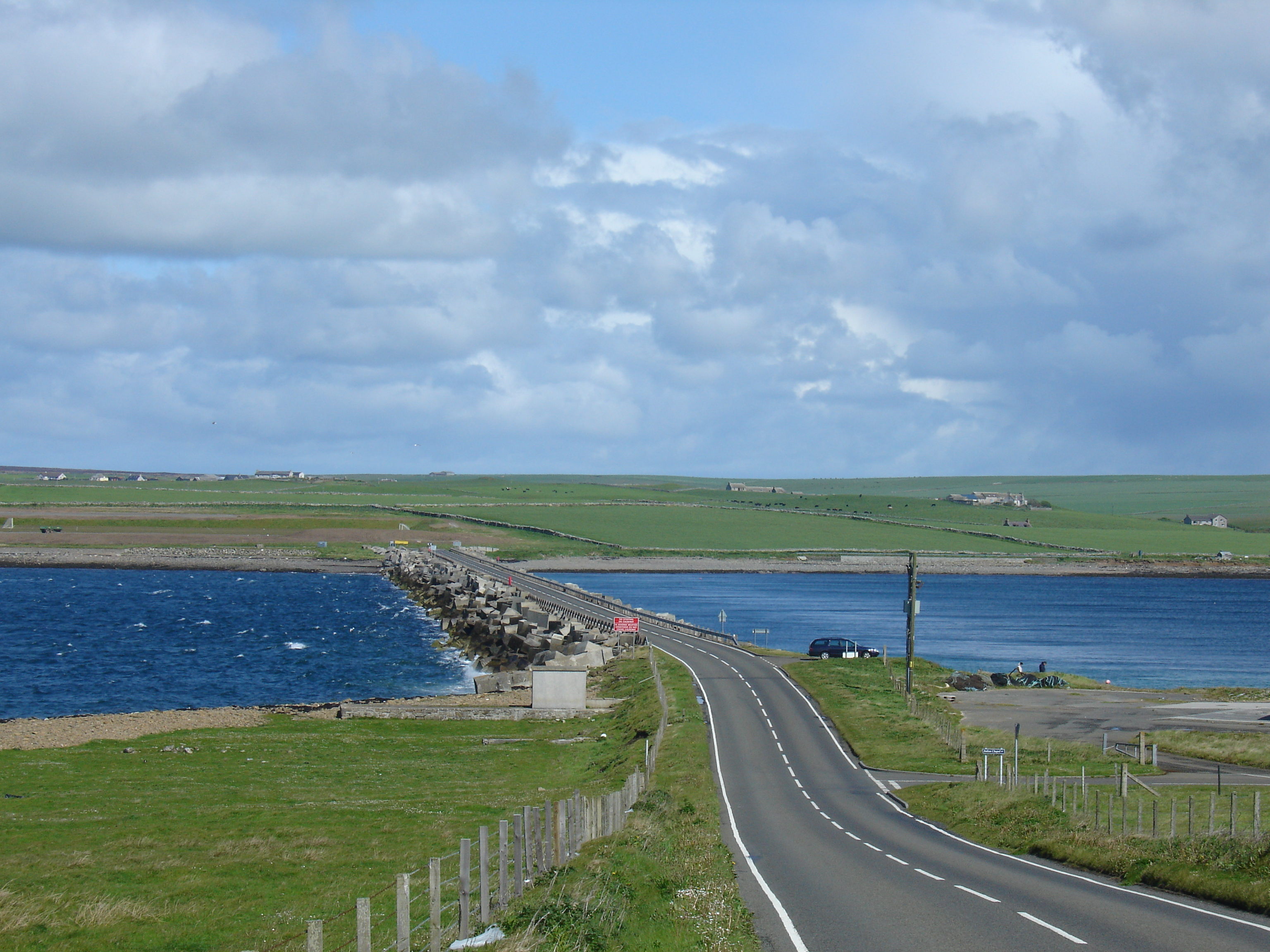
Churchill Barrier 1, blocking Kirk Sound

Similarly, four Orkney islands are joined to the Orkney Mainland by a series of causeways known as the Churchill Barriers. They are:

- South Ronaldsay
- Burray
- Lamb Holm
- Glimps Holm

Hunda is in turn connected to Burray via a causeway.

South Walls and Hoy are connected by a causeway called the Ayre. The islands are treated as one entity (Hoy) by the UK census.

An undersea tunnel between the archipelago and Caithness, at a length of about 9–10 miles (14–16 km) and a tunnel connecting Orkney Mainland to Shapinsay have been discussed, although little has come of it.

Shetland Islands

Several Shetland islands are joined to the Shetland Mainland:

- West Burra and East Burra (via Trondra)
- Muckle Roe
- Trondra
- Broch of Clickimin is a freshwater islet joined to the mainland by a stone causeway.
- Holm of Mel was a tidal island linked to the west coast of Bressay at low tide but it is now linked permanently to its larger neighbour by a 75m stone causeway.

There is also a bridge which joins Housay and Bruray in the Out Skerries.

Others

Various other islands are also connected by bridges or causeways, to the mainland or other islands, including:

- Inchgarvie (part of Forth Bridge), thus joined to both Fife and Lothian on the Mainland.
- Garbh Eilean at the entrance to Loch Glencoul is now joined to the mainland by both the Kylesku Bridge to the south and its associated roadworks to the north.
- Innis Chonan, an inhabited island in Loch Awe is connected to the mainland by a small road bridge.
- Moncreiffe Island connected to the mainland by the Tay Viaduct
- Buchan Ness is a tidal island joined to mainland Buchan by road.

== Tidal islands and tombolos ==
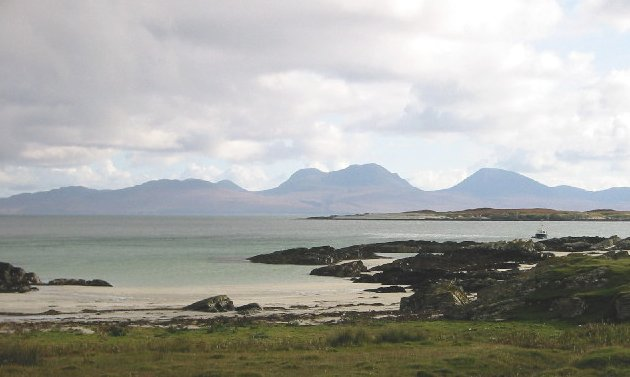
A beach on Oronsay by Colonsay, looking towards the Paps of Jura in the distance

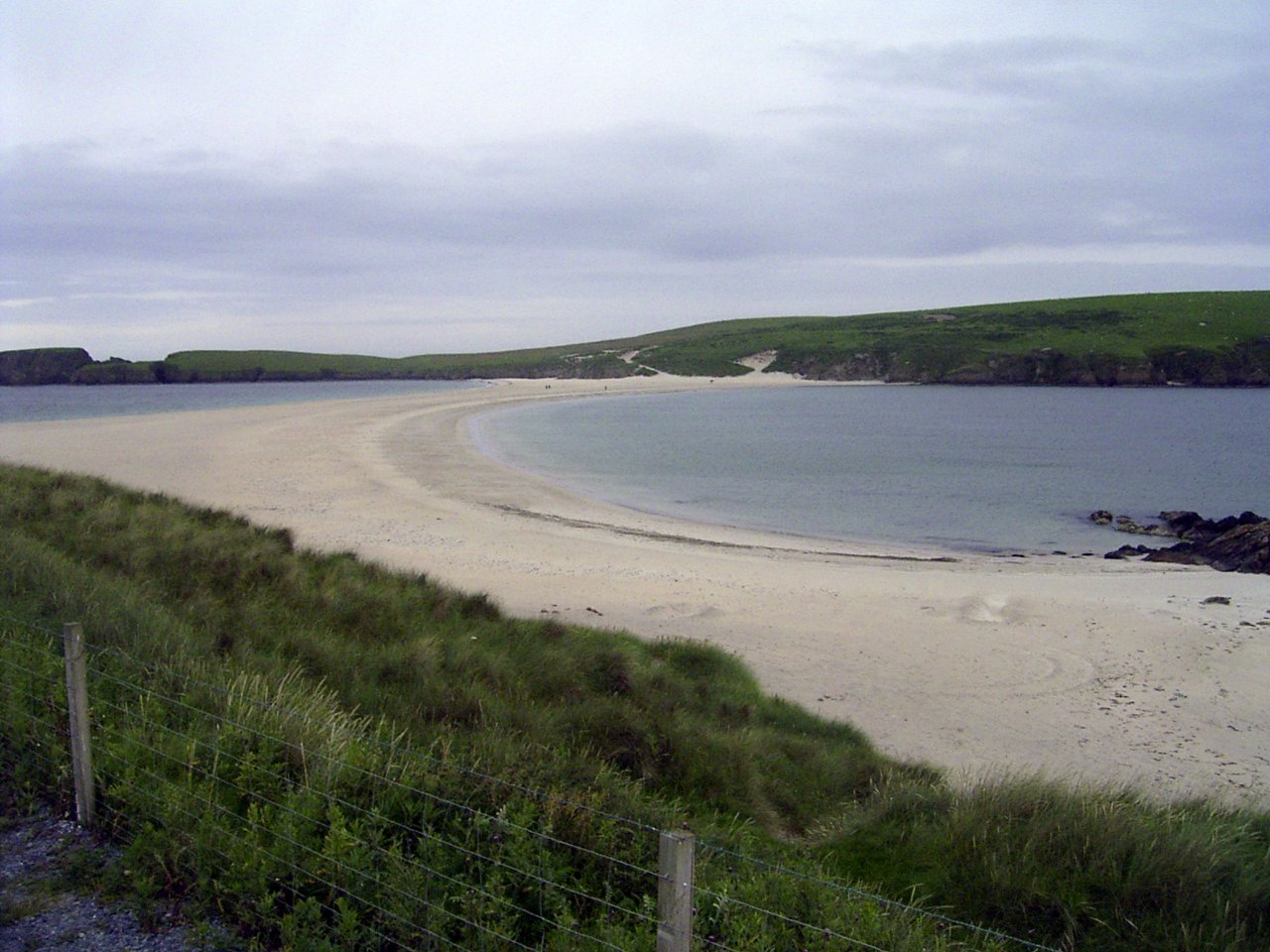
St Ninian's Isle and tombolo

There are a large number of small tidal islands in Scotland. The more notable ones include:

- Baleshare
- Bernera
- Calve Island
- Castle Island
- Corn Holm
- Cramond Island
- Island Davaar
- Dunnicaer
- Eilean Mhic Chrion
- Eilean Shona
- Eriska
- Erraid
- Helliar Holm
- Kili Holm
- Isle Ristol
- Sanday
- Torsa

Oronsay means "ebb island" and there are several tidal islands of this name.

The three main islands of the Monach Islands (Heisgeir), Ceann Iar, Ceann Ear and Shivinish are connected at low tides. It is said that at one time it was also possible to walk all the way to Baleshare, and on to North Uist, five miles (eight kilometres) away at low tide. In the 16th century, a large tidal wave was said to have washed the route away.

St Ninian's Isle is connected to Mainland Shetland by a tombolo. Although greater than 40 hectares in size it fails to meet the definition of an island used in this list as it is only surrounded by water during occasional spring tides and storms.

Dùn in St Kilda is separated from Hirta by a shallow strait about 50 metres (160 feet) wide. This is normally impassable but is reputed to dry out on rare occasions.

== Complex islands ==
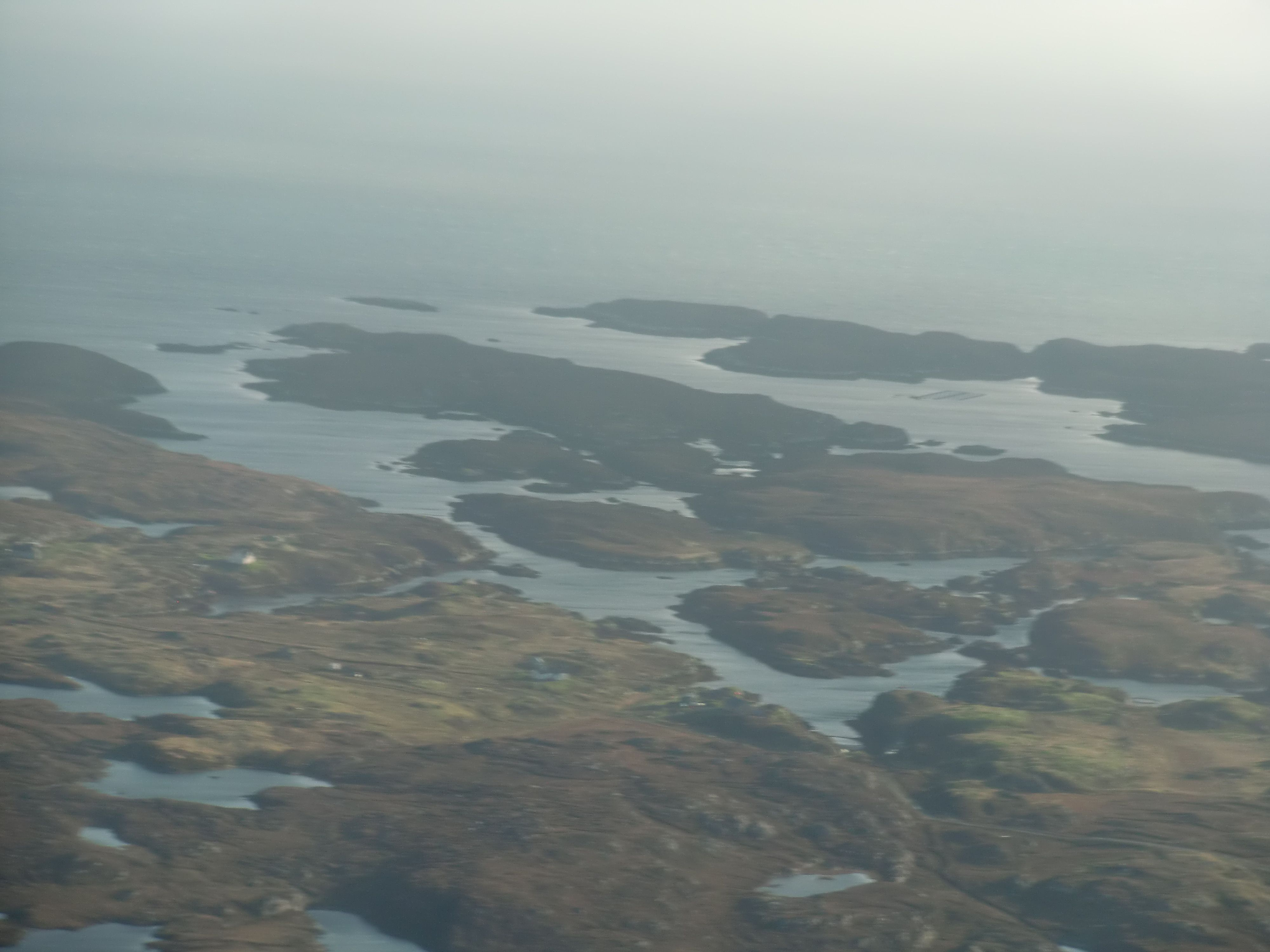
The islands of Eileanan Chearabhaigh at centre, with mainland Benbecula in the foreground and the northern tip of Wiay beyond

There are a number of offshore islands that defy easy classification.

- Ceallasaigh Mòr and Ceallasaigh Beag are islands in Loch Maddy, North Uist which are both c. 50 hectares (120 acres) in extent at high tide. At low tide they are connected to one another and several other small tidal islets in the shallow lagoon that surrounds them.
- Eileanan Iasgaich in Loch Boisdale, South Uist comprises five small islands and several other islets at high tide but forms a single large one of 50 hectares (120 acres) at low tide.
- Eileanan Chearabhaigh. At low tide these islands form a peninsula with a total area of 49 hectares (120 acres), which is connected to Benbecula by drying sands. At high tide the connection to Benbecula is lost and a number of small islets stretching for over 2 kilometres (1.2 mi) from east to west appear, the largest of which is about 30 hectares (74 acres) in extent.
- The Crowlin Islands, located in the Inner Sound off Raasay are three separate islands at high tide and a single one of 270 hectares (670 acres) at low tide.
- Similarly, Lunga in the Firth of Lorn is six or more separate islets at high tide but a single one of 254 hectares (630 acres) at low tide.

== Castle islands ==
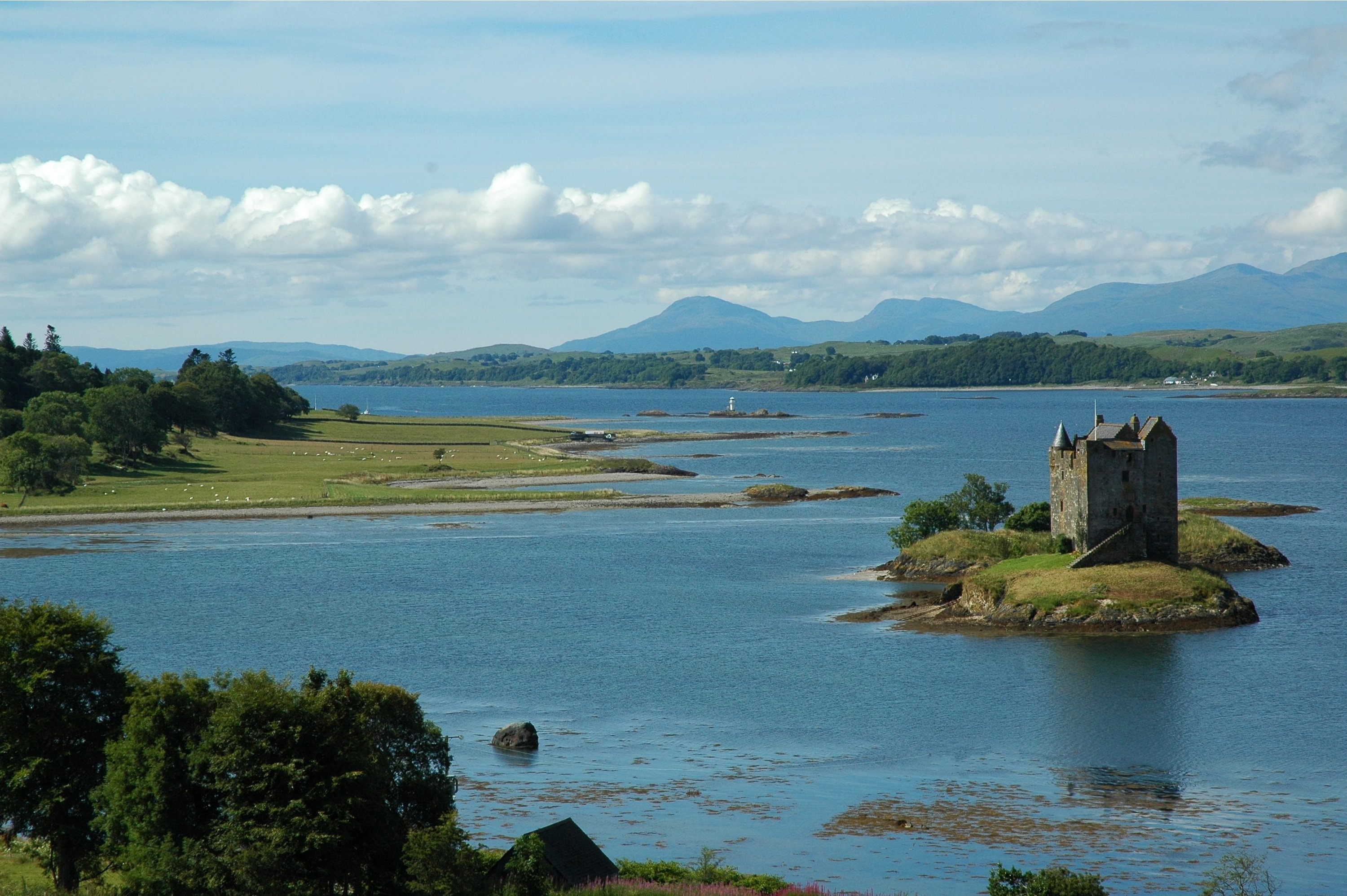
Castle Stalker, as seen in Monty Python and the Holy Grail

There are several small Scottish islands that are dominated by a castle or other fortification. The castle is often better known than the island, and the islands are often tidal or bridged. Due to their picturesque nature some of them are well known from postcards and films. Examples are:

- Bass Rock
- Broch of West Burrafirth
- Castle Island
- Calvay
- Castle Stalker
- Castle Tioram
- Eilean Aigas (F)
- Eilean Dearg, Loch Riddon
- Eilean Donan
- Inchtalla (F)
- Inveruglas Isle (F)
- Kilchurn Castle (F)
- Kisimul Castle
- Lochindorb Castle (F)
- Loch Leven Castle (F)
- Mousa
- Threave Castle (F)
- Wyre

Many of the Islands of the Forth and southern Orkney Islands have fortifications from the two world wars. Rosyth Castle stands on a former island.

== Holy islands ==
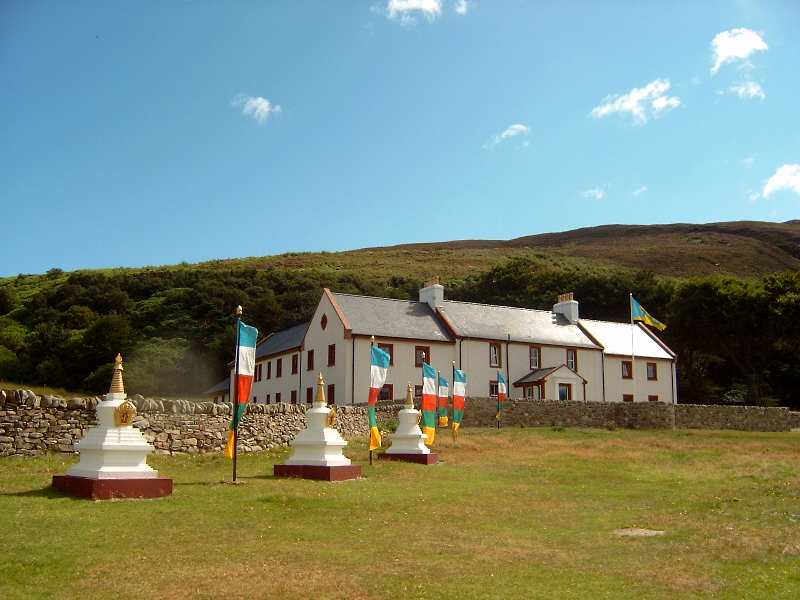
The Tibetan Buddhist Centre for World Peace and Health on Holy Island

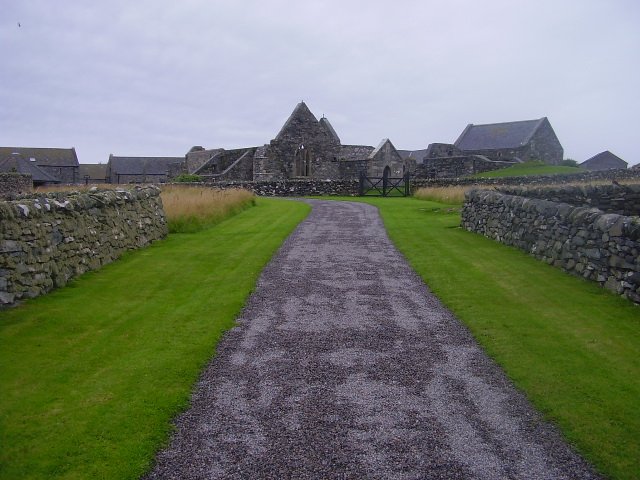
Oronsay Priory

A large number of the islands of Scotland have some kind of culdee/church connection, and/or are dominated by a church. The more notable include:

- Island Davaar
- Egilsay
- Eynhallow
- Holy Island
- Inchcolm
- Inch Kenneth
- Inchmahome (F)
- Iona
- Isle Maree
- North Rona
- Oronsay
- Papa Stronsay (current Transalpine Redemptorist monastery. Islands called "Papa" or "Pabbay" tend to be former saints' islands)
- St Ninian's Isle
- St Serf's Inch (F)
- Tiree ("land of Iona")

Brother Isle's name is not ecclesiastical in origin as is sometimes stated.

== Islands named after people ==
This is a list of islands, which are known to be named after someone. In some cases such as North Ronaldsay this status may not be obvious (it isn't named after a "Ronald", unlike South Ronaldsay). This list omits names such as Hildasay, where the person in question is mythological, or Ailsa Craig, where the individual in question is not known, and also Colonsay & Egilsay where the derivation is disputed.

- Eilean Chaluim Chille - Saint Columba
- Island Davaar - Saint Barr
- Eilean Donan - Saint Donan
- Flannan Isles - Saint Flannan
- Frank Lockwood's Island (south of Lochbuie, Mull)
- Inchcolm - Saint Columba
- Inch Kenneth - Saint Kenneth
- Inchmarnock - Saint Mearnag
- Inchmahome (F) - Saint Colmag
- Inchmurrin (F) - Saint Meadhran/Mirin
- Innis Chonan (F) - Saint Conan
- Isle Maree (F) - Maelrubha
- Isle Martin - Saint Martin
- North Rona - Saint Ronan
- St Serf's Inch (F) - Saint Serf
- Sweyn Holm – Sweyn Asleifsson
- Taransay - Saint Taran

Iqbal Singh, the owner of Vacsay, has also expressed wishes to rename it after Robert Burns.

== Places called "island" etc. that are not islands ==
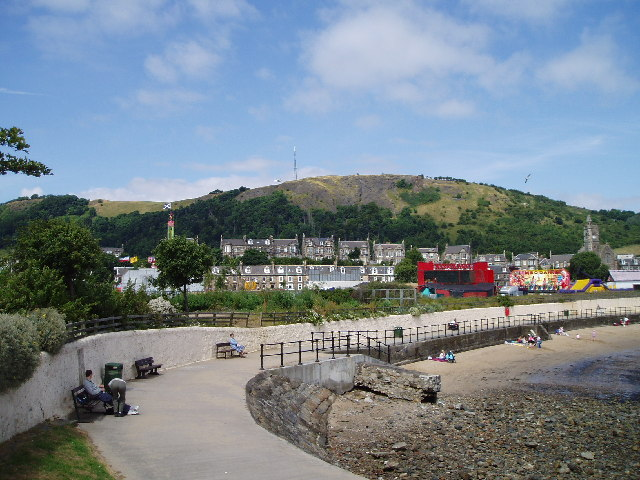
Burntisland - not actually an island

Some places in Scotland with names including "isle" or "island" are not islands. They include:

Name	Island group / location	It actually is
Barmore Island	Knapdale	part of mainland
Black Isle (An t-Eilean Dubh)	Ross and Cromarty	peninsula
Burntisland	Fife	a town on the mainland - most likely named for "Burnet's Land"
Eilean na h-Eaglaise	Torsa	peninsula
Eilean Garbh	Gigha	a peninsula of Gigha
Isle of Fethaland	Shetland	place on mainland of Shetland
Gluss Isle	Shetland	joined to mainland of Shetland
Isle of Harris (Na Hearadh)	Outer Hebrides	part of an island
Isle of Lewis (Eilean Leòdhais)	Outer Hebrides	part of an island
Isleornsay (Eilean Iarmain)	Skye	place on Skye
Islesteps (south of Dumfries)	Dumfries and Galloway	inland place in Scotland
Isle of Whithorn	Dumfries and Galloway	place on coast of Scotland

Lewis and Harris are separated by a range of hills but form one island, and are sometimes referred to as "Lewis and Harris". Isle of Whithorn and the Black Isle are peninsulas, and Isleornsay is a village which looks out onto the island of Ornsay. There is no commonly accepted derivation for "Burntisland" which had numerous other forms in the past, such as "Brintilun" and "Ye Brint Eland".

Gluss Isle at the western entrance to Sullom Voe is one of the many promontories in Orkney and Shetland connected to a larger body of land by an ayre.

=== Other elements ===
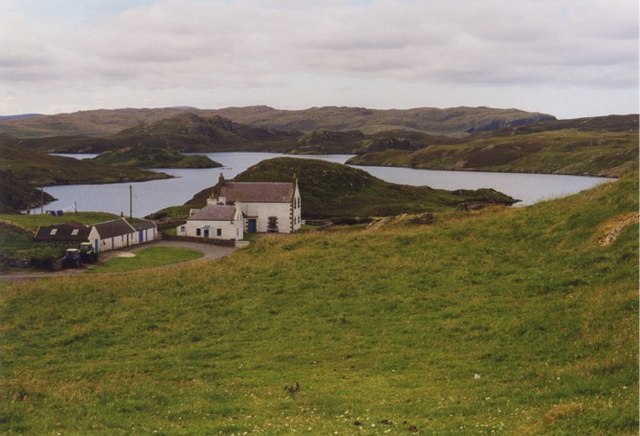
Vementry Farm, on Mainland Shetland, with Isle of Vementry in hinterground

The name "Inch" (Innis) can mean island (e.g. Inchkenneth, Inchcolm), but is also used for terra firma surrounded by marsh e.g. Markinch, Insch.

Eilean is Gaelic for "island". However, Inistrynich, Eilean na Maodail, Eilean Dubh and Liever Island are all promontories on Loch Awe as opposed to islands, despite their names. Likewise Eilean Aoidhe on Loch Fyne. The Black Isle is also An t-Eilean Dubh in Gaelic, while Eilean Glas is part of Scalpay.

"-holm" is also common as a suffix in various landlocked placenames, especially in the far south of mainland Scotland e.g. Langholm, Kirk Yetholm, Holmhead (by Cumnock), Holmhill (next to Thornhill, Nithsdale). Some of these were river islands in their time, or dry land surrounded by marsh. "Holm" can be found in an element in Holmsgarth, now a suburb of Lerwick and the Parish of Holm on Mainland Shetland and Mainland Orkney respectively. Neither of these is an island in its own right.

=== Islands named after mainland areas ===
Likewise, occasionally an island may be named after a location on the nearby mainland, or a major neighbouring island – or vice versa. Examples of this include: Vementry, which was originally the name of an island, but whose name has been transferred to a nearby farm on Mainland Shetland; Oldany Island, whose name has been transferred to Oldany; Cramond Island which is named after neighbouring Cramond (a district of Edinburgh); and Eilean Mhealasta in the Outer Hebrides, which is named after Mealista on Lewis.

The name Easdale appears to be the combination of eas, which is Gaelic for "waterfall" and dal, the Norse for "valley". However, it is not clear why either description should apply to this tiny island which is low-lying and has no waterfalls and the name may have come from the nearby village of the same name on Seil.

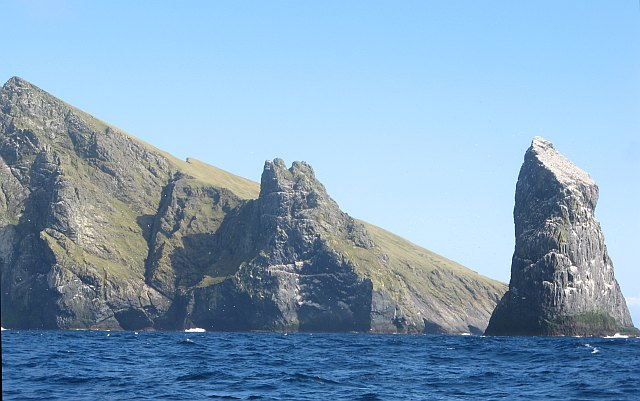
The 172m high Stac Lee off the coast of Boreray, St Kilda

== Stacks ==
It has been estimated that there are about 275 sea stacks in Scotland, of which around 110 are located around the coasts of Shetland. The highest are Stac an Armin and Stac Lee, St Kilda. In July 1967, 15 million people watched the climbing of the Old Man of Hoy live on BBC television. However, for many of the remoter stacks, especially in Shetland, there is no record of there having been any attempt by rock climbers to ascend them.

== Crannogs ==
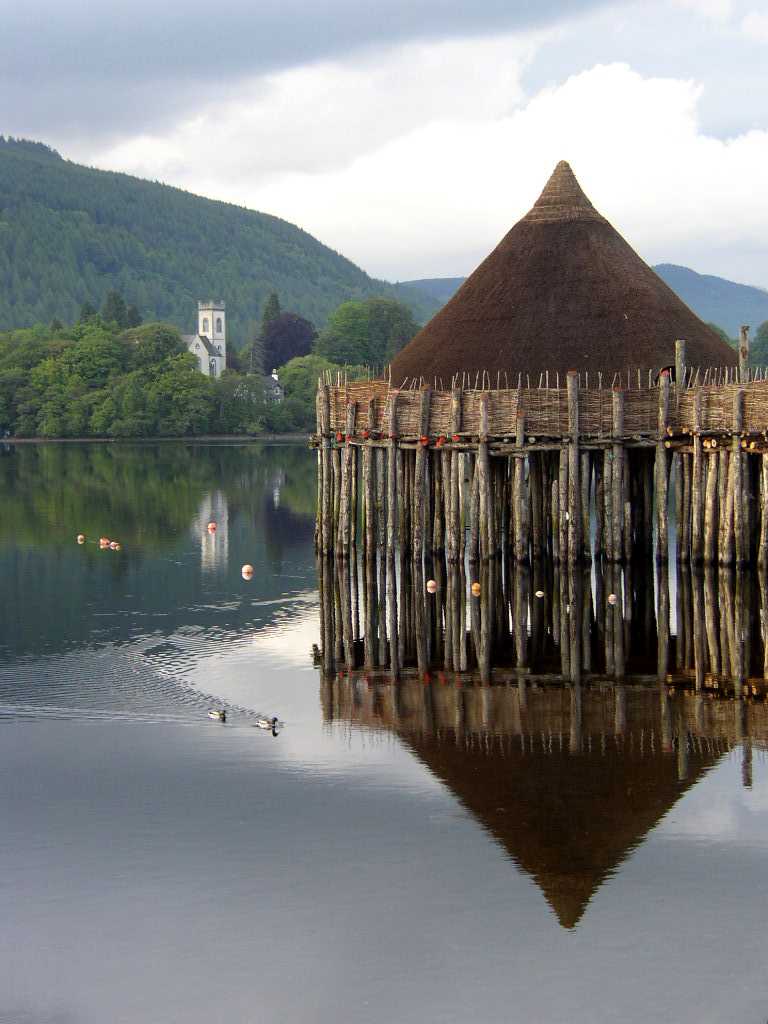
Modern reconstruction of a crannog in Loch Tay

Crannogs are prehistoric artificial islands created in lochs. There are several hundred sites in Scotland. Today, crannogs typically appear as small, circular islands, between 10 and 30 metres (30–100 feet) in diameter. Scottish crannogs include:

- Breachacha on Coll
- Cherry Island in Loch Ness
- Dùn Anlaimh on Coll
- Eilean Dòmhnuill on North Uist
- Keppinch (or The Kitchen) in Loch Lomond

== See also ==
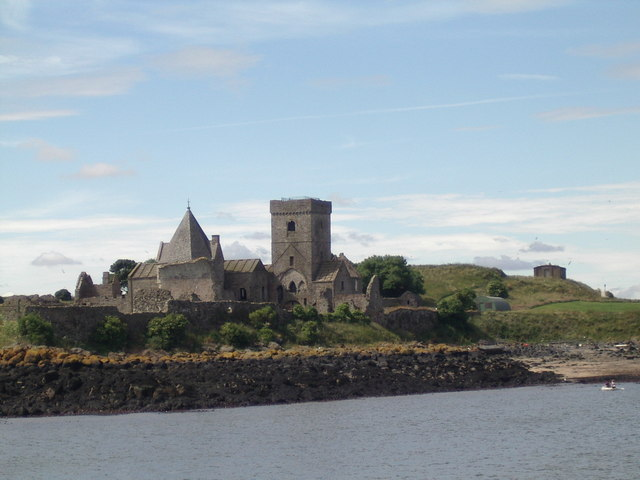
Inchcolm Abbey, Firth of Forth

- British Isles
- Geography of Scotland
- List of the British Isles by area
- List of lochs on Scottish islands
- List of Marilyns on Scottish islands
- List of Munros on Skye and Mull
- List of Orkney islands
- List of Outer Hebrides
- List of Shetland islands
- Scottish island names

== References and footnotes ==
Notes

Specific references

General references

- Bailey, Patrick (1998). "Faroe, Orkney, Gran Canaria: Case Studies in the Geography of Marginal Europe". Geography. 83 (4): 309–21. doi:10.1080/20436564.1998.12452666. JSTOR 40573105.
- Coull, J. R. (1967). "A Comparison of Demographic Trends in the Faroe and Shetland Islands". Transactions of the Institute of British Geographers. 41 (41): 159–66. doi:10.2307/621333. JSTOR 621333.
- General Register Office for Scotland (28 November 2003) Scotland's Census 2001 – Occasional Paper No 10: Statistics for Inhabited Islands. Retrieved 26 February 2012.
- Haswell-Smith, Hamish (2004). The Scottish Islands. Edinburgh: Canongate. ISBN 978-1-84195-454-7.
- MacDonald, Fraser (2006). "The last outpost of Empire: Rockall and the Cold War". Journal of Historical Geography. 32 (3): 627–647. doi:10.1016/j.jhg.2005.10.009.
- Mellor, Chris (January 2020). "An illustrated guide to sea stack climbing in the UK & Ireland" (PDF). needlesports.
- Murray, W.H. (1973) The Islands of Western Scotland: the Inner and Outer Hebrides. London. Eyre Methuen. ISBN 0413303802
- Murton, Paul (2017), The Hebrides, Edinburgh: Birlinn, ISBN 978-1-78027-467-6
- National Records of Scotland (15 August 2013). "Appendix 2: Population and households on Scotland's Inhabited Islands" (PDF). Statistical Bulletin: 2011 Census: First Results on Population and Household Estimates for Scotland Release 1C (Part Two) (PDF) (Report). SG/2013/126.
- Nicolson, James R. (1972) Shetland. Newton Abbot. David & Charles.
- Omand, Donald (ed.) (2003) The Orkney Book. Edinburgh. Birlinn. ISBN 1-84158-254-9
- Symonds, James (June 1999) "Toiling in the Vale of Tears: Everyday Life and Resistance in South Uist, Outer Hebrides, 1760—1860". International Journal of Historical Archaeology/JSTOR. 3 No. 2, Archaeologies of Resistance in Britain and Ireland, Part II, pp. 101–122. Retrieved 8 September 2013.
- Turnock, David (1969). "Regional Development in the Crofting Counties". Transactions of the Institute of British Geographers. 48 (48): 189–204. doi:10.2307/621498. JSTOR 621498.
