= Sgarabhaigh =

Small uninhabited island in the Outer Hebrides, Scotland

Coordinates: 57°41′30″N 7°1′0″W

Sgarabhaigh (formerly anglicised Scaravay) is a small uninhabited island in the eastern end of the Sound of Harris, Outer Hebrides, Scotland.

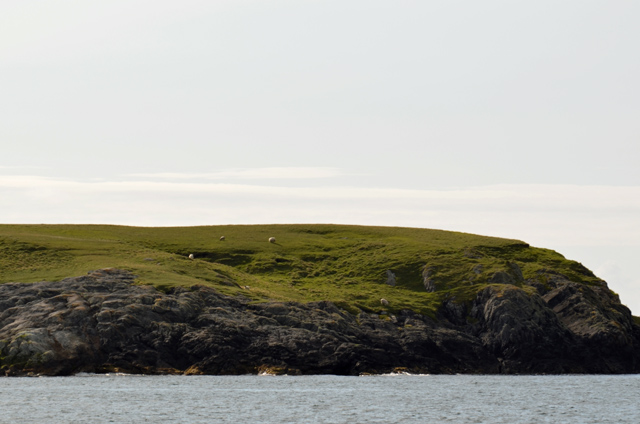

It is approximately 40 acres (160,000 m^{2}) in size and is home to many seabirds, otters and grey seals. Sgarabhaigh and its sister islands of Grodhaigh and Bhatam, Lingeigh and Gilsaigh are colloquially known as the "Pabach Islands" as they used to provide peat for the islanders on Pabbay when their own supplies ran out in the 19th century.

The island is now the focus for a sustainability project designed to protect the island's environment, help local economic and social regeneration in the wider islands, and provide people with a perpetual link to Scotland. Whilst open to all, the project particularly wants to connect with descendants of the islanders who were displaced by the Highland Clearances of the 18th and 19th centuries.

In July 2009, English former merchant banker Geoff Spice decided to be cast away on Sgarabhaigh for a month in order to give up his smoking habit, and attracted some media attention to the island.

== See also ==
- List of islands of Scotland
