= North Havra =

Small island off south west Shetland

Coordinates: 60°9′57″N 1°20′7″W

North Havra (Old Norse: Hafrey, ocean island) is a small island off south west Shetland. It is 30 metres at its highest point.

Situated 1/3 mile from the ness-end of South Whiteness, the island possess a lighthouse and a couple of small sheep pens (cribs), as well as a couple dozen sheep and different bird species. North Havra is currently owned by Thomas Stout who uses it for crofting.

== See also ==
- List of islands of Scotland
