= Breachacha crannog =

Coordinates: 56°34′58.23″N 6°37′59.46″W

The Breachacha crannog is a crannog located near Loch Breachacha, on the Inner Hebridean island of Coll. The crannog is designated as a Scheduled monument. A scheduled monument is a 'nationally important' archaeological site or historic building, given legal protection against unauthorised change. There are about 8,000 such sites in Scotland.

== Description ==
Location of duns, hillforts, and crannogs, on Coll.

The crannog is located at grid reference NM15615304; about 1 kilometre (0.62 mi) south of Breachacha Castle. It sits within the former loch which was known as Poll nam Broig. The loch was drained in 1875 and today the crannog sits in an arable field. The surrounding ground is marshy and can be accessed only from the east.

The crannog is oval-shaped and consists of a stone and earth mound with a flattened top. It stands 2 metres (6 ft 7 in) high and measures 26 by 21 metres (85 ft 4 in by 68 ft 11 in) at the base, and 16 by 11 metres (52 ft 6 in by 36 ft 1 in) on the top. The crown of the mound stands about 1 metre (3 ft 3 in) above the surrounding former loch-bed; and according to Mark W. Holley, this corresponds with what would have been the maximum water level of the old loch. Holley's calculations deduced that when the loch was full, the crannog would have been located about 30 metres (98 ft 5 in) from shore.

Holley surveyed the site in 1995 and noted a series of five, semicircular pits dug into the ground on the east, south, and south-west sides of the crannog. He considered these holes to have been dug relatively recently, since the early 20th century antiquary Erskine Beveridge made no mention of them, nor did he mention any form of excavation on site. There is no trace of a causeway, jetty, or harbour on the site. There is no trace of any walling at the site; or of any protruding timbers. Holley noted that the stones appear to be of local origin. There are no other man-made features near the site.
