= Loch Lomond National Nature Reserve =

Nature reserve in Scotland

- IUCN category IV (habitat/species management area)
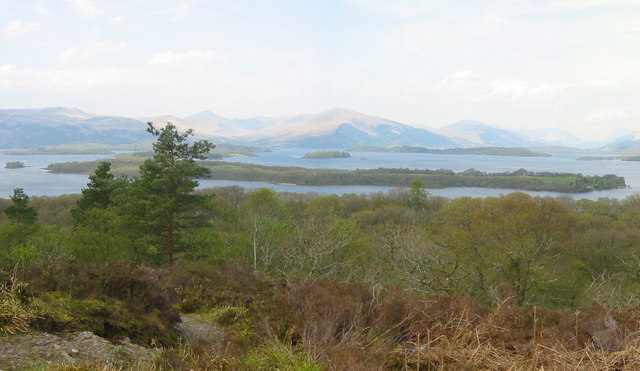
- View from the summit (85m) of Inchcailloch over the woodland and the neighbouring island, Inchfad

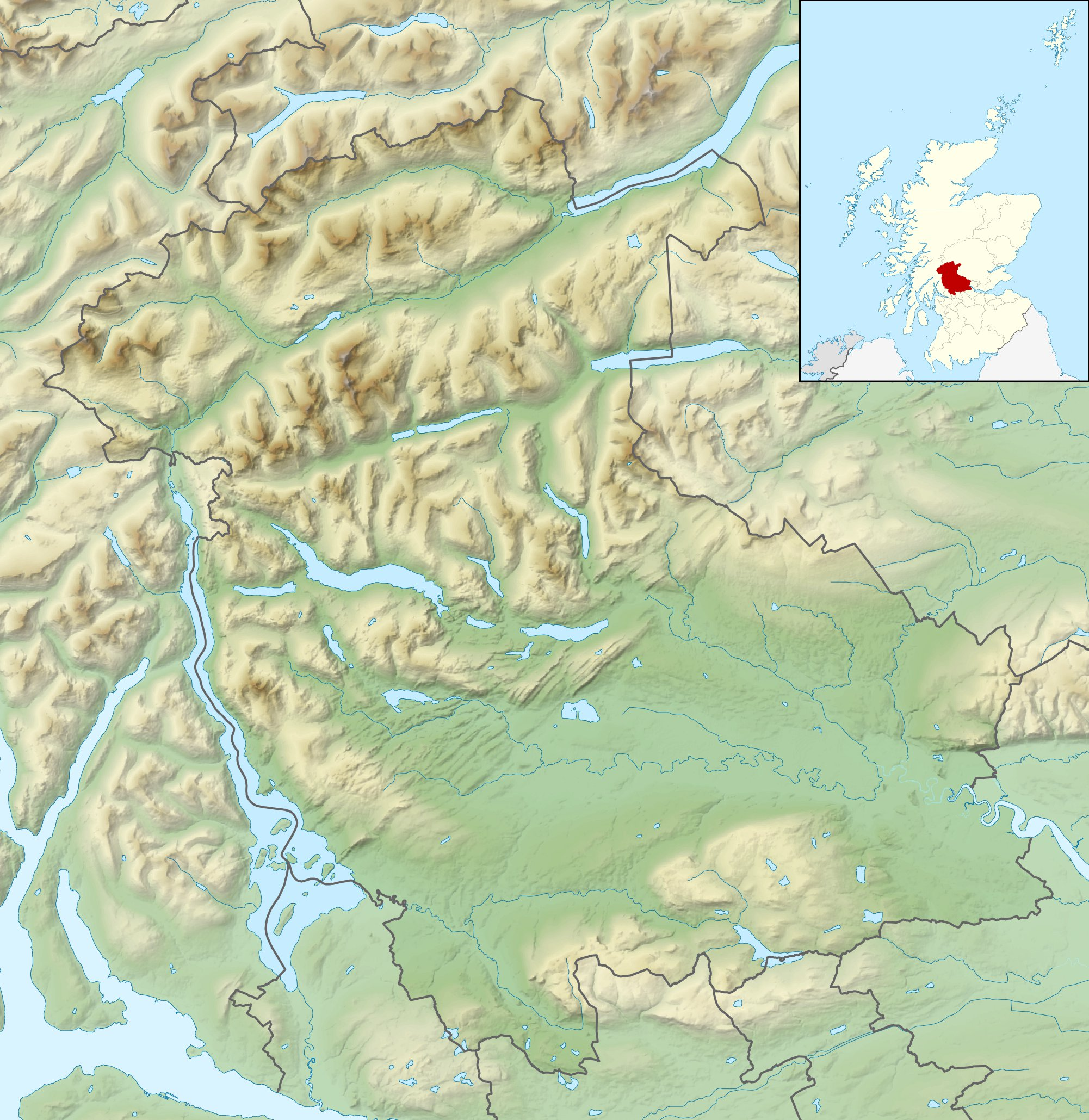
- Location within Stirling
- Location: Scotland
- Coordinates: 56.082°N 4.5521°W
- Area: 4.3 km^{2} (1.7 sq mi)
- Established: 1958
- Governing body: NatureScot
- Website: Loch Lomond NNR

Loch Lomond National Nature Reserve (NNR) (Scottish Gaelic: Tèarmann Nàdair Nàiseanta Loch Laomainn) encompasses 430 hectares of land at the southeastern part of Loch Lomond in the council areas of Stirling and West Dunbartonshire, in Scotland. It covers the islands of Inchcailloch, Clairinsh, Torrinch, Creinch and Aber Isle, alongside areas of woodland and wetlands to either side of the mouth of the Endrick Water. NatureScot owns two parts of the reserve - the island of Inchcailloch and part of Gartfairn Wood - and the rest is privately owned. The reserve is managed by a partnership consisting of NatureScot, the RSPB Scotland and the Loch Lomond and The Trossachs National Park, along with the owners and tenants of the land under agreements. Within this framework NatureScot directly manage the islands of Clairinsh, Inchcailloch, Torrinch and Creinch, and land to the north of the Endrick Water. The RSPB manages the area to the south of the Endrick Water, and the national park manages visitor facilities on Inchcailloch.

The first part of Loch Lomond to be declared a national nature reserve was Clairinsh in 1958; the reserve was subsequently extended three times to reach its present size. The reserve encompasses a wide range of habitats, including woodlands, open water, grassland and wetlands. Due to its position on the Highland Boundary Fault, the varying natural environments of the highlands and lowlands give rise to habitats and species at both their northern and southern limit. Prior to becoming an NNR, the land was used for farming, producing woodland and to a lesser degree, for recreation. Some of these practices are still used, but now with a stronger focus on wildlife practices and maintaining the diversity of the area.

== Flora and fauna ==
There are several different habitats present on the reserve. The islands, and the northern part of the mainland section consist of Atlantic oakwoods, a type of woodland found along the Atlantic fringe of Europe in areas with high rainfall. These woods consist predominantly of oak trees, but other species such as ash, elm and alder are also found. Atlantic oakwoods are characterised by their lichens and mosses, which thrive in the damp conditions, and support many species of plants and birds. The makeup of woodland on each island, and on the mainland section, differs slightly, adding to the diversity of habitats at Loch Lomond NNR. Much of the mainland section of the reserve is the flood plain of the Endrick Water, and so consists of wetland habitats such as swamp, mire, fen, marsh, reed bed, wet woodland and wet meadow. Unlike many other European rivers the Endrick has not undergone drainage or flood defence schemes: this considered to be a key factor underpinning the importance of the site from a nature conservation point of view.

Due to the diverse range of habitats present, the reserve is considered to be a 'hot spot' for plant life. Nearly 400 vascular plants have been recorded here, representing around 25% of all the species found in Britain. A number of rare plants are found at the reserve, including elongated sedge, six-stamened waterwort, cowbane, summer snowflake and mudwort. The diverse range of habitats also supports an abundance range of invertebrates, including beetles, dragonflies, damselflies, and moths, although relatively few rare or scarce species have been found.

Loch Lomond NNR supports a wide range of bird species. During the winter months large numbers of geese migrate to the reserve, including over 1% of the entire global population of Greenland white-fronted geese (around 200 individuals), and up to 3,000 greylag geese. The reserve is also important for breeding birds during the summer months, with the islands supporting an exceptionally high density of breeding insect-eating species such as pied flycatchers. Other species breeding here include common grasshopper warblers, sedge warblers, reed buntings, common redstart, spotted flycatchers, Eurasian skylarks, common buzzards, and common snipes. Ospreys are regularly seen at the Endrick Mouth section of the reserve, and crake may also be present. Capercaillie were formerly present on the reserve, but as of 2018 were no longer to be found.

Loch Lomond itself hosts populations of powan, whilst the Endrick Water supports brook lamprey and Atlantic salmon. The reserve hosts an important population of river lamprey, which display an unusual behavioural trait not seen elsewhere in Britain: unlike other populations, in which young hatch in rivers before migrating to the sea, the river lamprey of the Endrick remain in freshwater, heading for Loch Lomond as adults. Otters live along the shore of the loch, especially along the mainland section of the reserve. In January 2023 RSPB Scotland released a family of beavers into the southeastern area of the loch under licence from NatureScot. The beaver family, consisting of an adult pair and their five offspring, were translocated from a site in Tayside where beaver activity was having a negative impact that could not be mitigated.

== Conservation designations ==
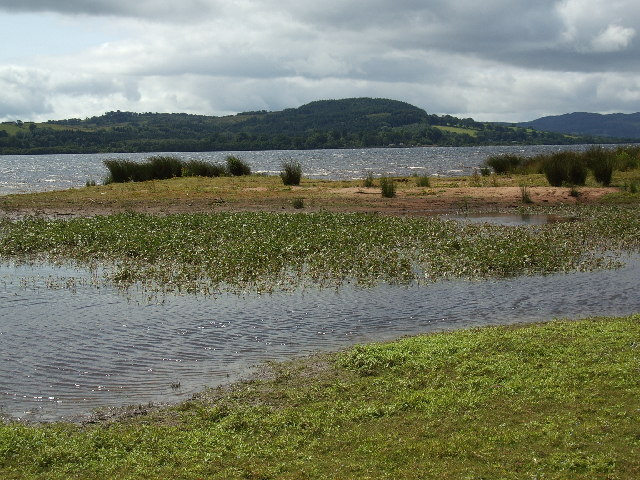
Loch Lomond Nature Reserve. Adjacent to the River Endrick

The national nature reserve (NNR) holds a number of other overlapping conservation designations. The Endrick Mouth and Islands Site of Special Scientific Interest (SSSI) is almost directly coincident with the NNR, whilst the Portnellan - Ross Priory - Claddochside SSSI overlaps with the NNR at the western edge of the mainland section. The Endrick Water Special Area of Conservation (SAC) covers the Endrick Water, including the section through the NNR, and the Loch Lomond Woods SAC includes the islands of Inchcailloch, Clairinsh, Torrinch and Creinch. These islands, and the area of the NNR to the south of the Endrick Water, form the Loch Lomond Ramsar site. Most of the mainland portion of the NNR also forms part of the Loch Lomond Special Protection Area (SPA). The NNR is classified as a Category IV protected area by the International Union for Conservation of Nature.

== Islands within the reserve ==
=== Aber Isle ===
Aber Island, near the mouth of the River Endrick, has the only hornbeams in the area, and is also home to many guelder roses.

=== Clairinsh ===
Clairinsh is considered to have some of the most natural woodland in the area, and was the first part of the current NNR to receive the designation. It is notable for the age structure of its oak trees, which range between 21 and 165 years old, and also the remains of a crannog, which can be seen offshore.

=== Creinch ===
The woodland of Creinc is notable for its large coppiced wych elms and mature ash trees, whilst its shoreline supports plants such as globeflower, columbine and goldilocks buttercup.

=== Inchcailloch ===
Inchcailloch (thought to mean "island of the old or cowled woman") is renowned for its natural and cultural heritage. There are many traces of past human settlement around Loch Lomond NNR and one particularly noteworthy example is the 13th century church on Inchcailloch, which is the only scheduled monument in or around Loch Lomond. Other interesting historical remains on Inchcailloch include the drying kilns and a ruined farm. The island is the main attraction for visitors to the reserve, receiving 15,000 people each year. Most visitors arrive by ferry from Balmaha, although some also arrive in their own boats. The island has a network of paths good path network, a picnic area, a campsite and toilet facilities: these facilities are managed by the National Park Authority.

=== Torrinch ===
The woodland on Torrinch consists of more birch than the other islands; it also hosts some aspen.
