= Royal Scottish Forestry Society =

- Abbreviation: RSFS
- Formation: 1854
- Type: Registered charity
- Registration no.: SC002058
- Purpose: Woodland management
- Headquarters: Kirkmahoe, Dumfries
- Region served: Scotland
- Patron: Queen Elizabeth II
- Main organ: Scottish Forestry Journal
- Website: www.rsfs.org.uk
- Formerly called: Royal Scottish Arboricultural Society

The Royal Scottish Forestry Society was founded in 1854 as the Scottish Arboricultural Society. In 1869, the society received the patronage of Queen Victoria and the "Royal" prefix was added in 1887. The name changed to the current one in 1930.

In addition to advising the forestry industry, the RSFS manages its own woodland, Cashel Forest at Cashel, near Milarrochy Bay on the east shore of Loch Lomond. The RSFS purchased the site in 1996 and since then has been establishing a native woodland to demonstrate best practice in woodland management and growing timber.

The RSFS publishes a journal, Scottish Forestry.

Among its past presidents was the Scottish botanist Dr. Hugh Cleghorn.

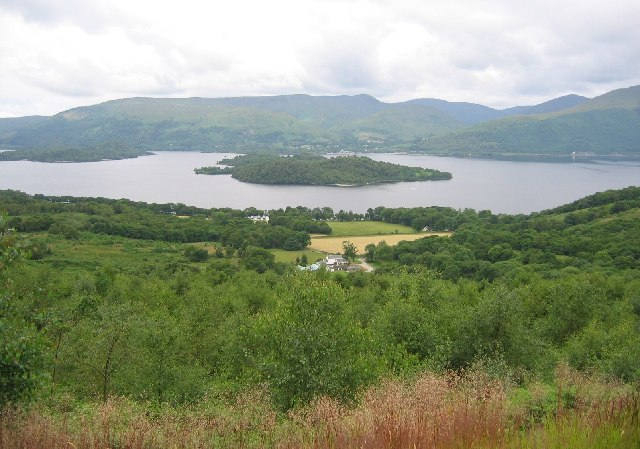
Cashel Forest on Loch Lomondside, founded by the RSFS in 1996

== See also ==
- The Royal Forestry Society of England, Wales and Northern Ireland
