= Inchcailloch =

Island in Stirling, Scotland

Innis Cailleach (Gaelic)

Location
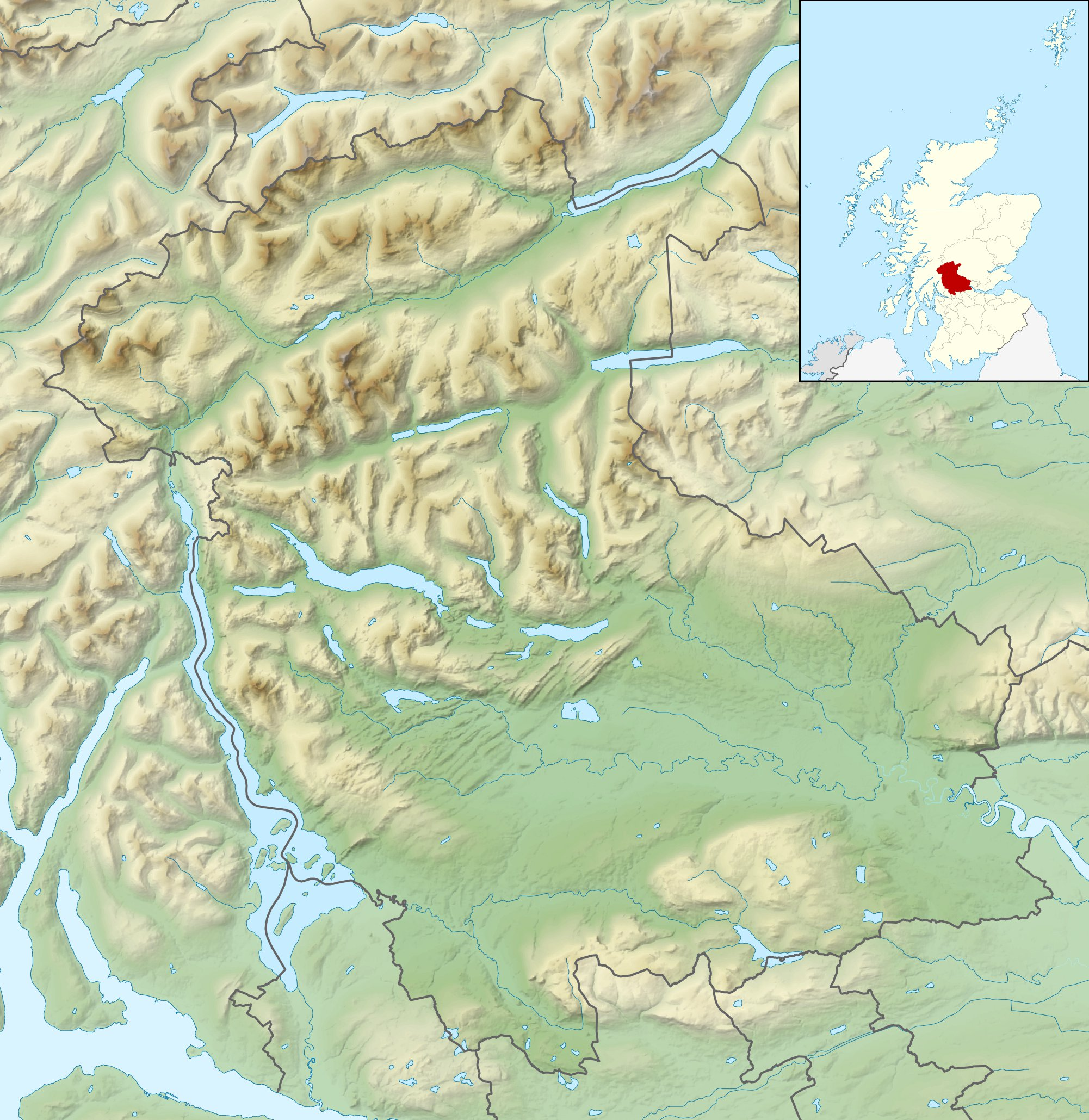
- Location within Stirling
- OS grid reference: NS410905
- Coordinates: 56.081°N 4.555°W

Name
- Name meaning: Isle of the old woman

Physical geography
- Island group: Loch Lomond
- Area: 50 hectares (0.19 sq mi)
- Area rank: 199= (Freshwater: 6)
- Highest elevation: 85 metres (279 ft)

Administration
- Council area: Stirling
- Country: Scotland
- Sovereign state: United Kingdom

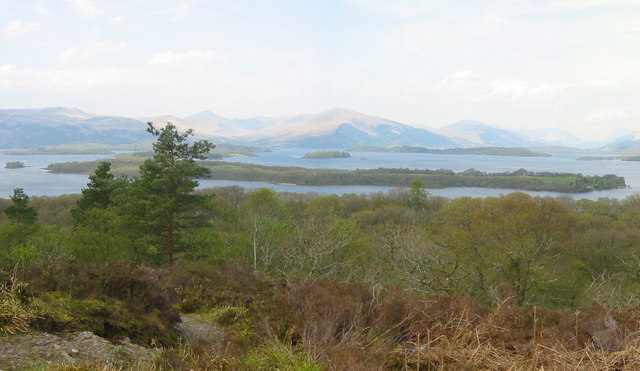
From the summit of Inchcailloch over the woodland with the neighbouring island, Inchfad in the background

Inchcailloch (Scottish Gaelic: Innis na Cailleach) is an islet on Loch Lomond in Scotland. It is 85 metres (279 ft) at its highest point. It is also known to some as Inchebroida.

The name Inchcailloch means "Isle of the old woman" or "Isle of the Cowled (Hooded) Woman" in the Scottish Gaelic language. Saint Kentigerna went to Scotland from Ireland to preach and spread Christianity and the island is thought to be named after her.

== Geography and geology ==
Inchmurrin, Creinch, Torrinch, and Inchcailloch all form part of the Highland boundary fault.

There is a burial ground in the north of the island, and a bay, Port Bawn (Scottish Gaelic: Port Bàn; English: White Port), in the south.

Like many of the Loch Lomond islands, it is quite heavily wooded.

== Transport ==
There is a passenger ferry across the short channel separating it from Balmaha on the mainland. As a result, it receives more visitors than most of the Loch Lomond islands, currently 20,000 visitors per year. There is a camp site in the south at Port Bawn and a nature trail.

== History ==
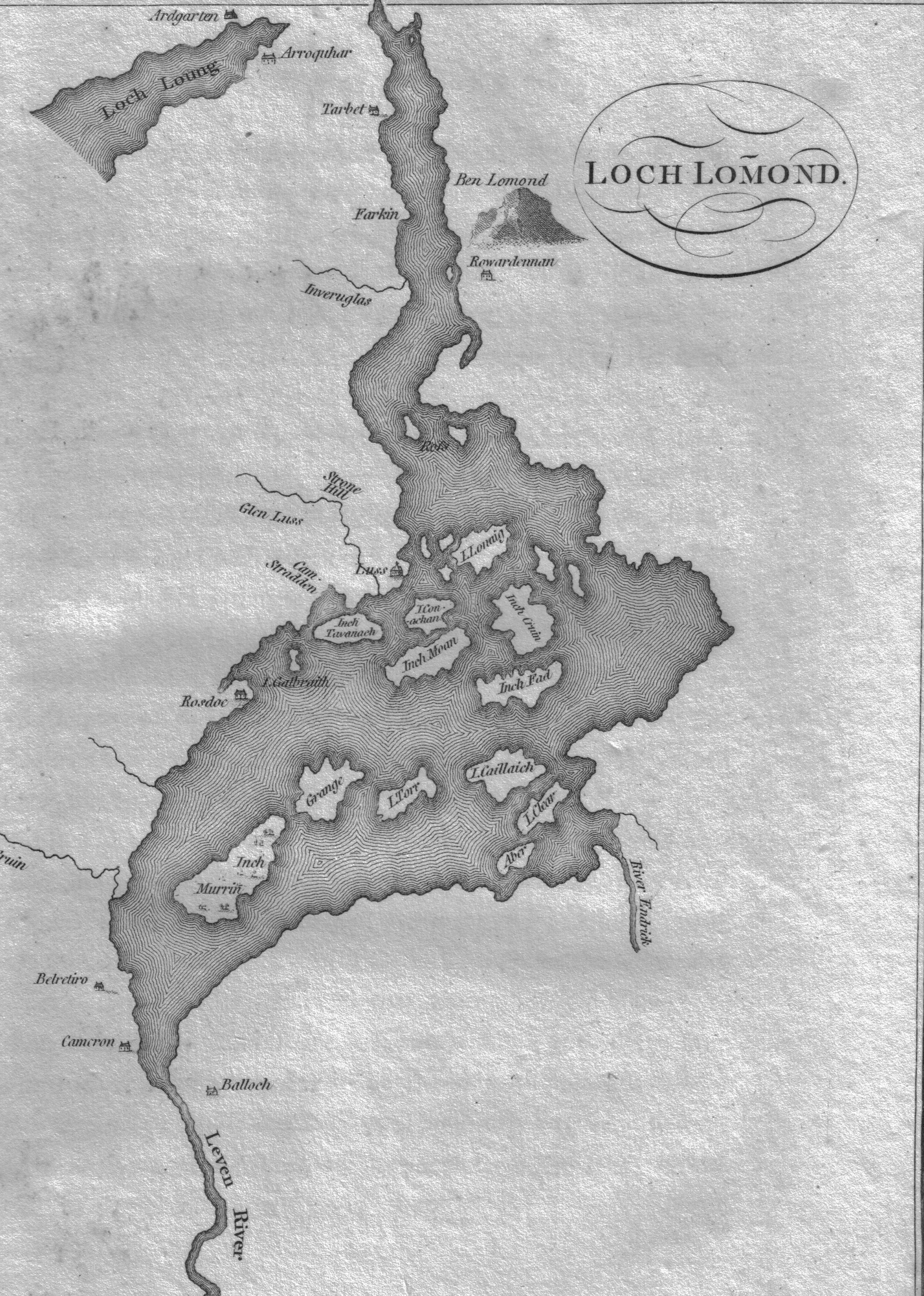
A map of the 1800s showing the islands of Loch Lomond.

Inchcailloch has been used as a hunting forest since the reign of Robert the Bruce. Deer still roam the island. White deer have been seen on the island in 2003. The narrow crossing is very shallow making an easy passage for deer to ford. The island was farmed until the early 19th century, being recorded in 1800 as producing good wheat and oats; the ruins of the farm can still be seen. For around 130 years, Inchcailloch was an oak plantation. The resulting timber was processed at Balmaha (on the site of the Highland Way Inn), for making wood vinegar (pyroligneous acid), wood tar, and dye.

Inchcailloch had a church dedicated to St Kentigerna, which was the parish church until 1621, but the graveyard was used until 1947. St Kentigerna was an Irish woman who is not to be confused with St Kentigern (a man who is also known as St Mungo). The Clan MacGregor burial ground includes some of Rob Roy's ancestors. Legends have passed by word of mouth that the bones of a woman were found under the altar stone during an excavation.

Inchcailloch forms part of Loch Lomond National Nature Reserve, owned and run by Scottish Natural Heritage.

== Literary references ==
Inchcailloch is mentioned in Dr William Fraser's The Lennox (1874).

The travel writer, H.V. Morton visited in the 1930s, and remarked:

The isle is sacred to the MacGregors, and in the tangled branches and amongst the green trees is their ancient burial ground. It was on the halidom of him 'who sleeps beneath the grey stone of Inchcailloch' that members of this vigorous clan used to take their oaths.

Walter Scott refers to the island in his poem, The Lady of the Lake -

A slender crosslet formed with care
A cubit's length in measure due
The shafts and limbs were rods of yew
Whose parents in Inch Cailliach wave
Their Shadows o'er Clan Alpine's grave,
And, answering Lomond's breezes deep,
Soothe many a chieftain's endless sleep.

== See also ==
- List of islands of Scotland
