= Creinch =

Island in Scotland

Coordinates: 56°3′53″N 4°34′50″W

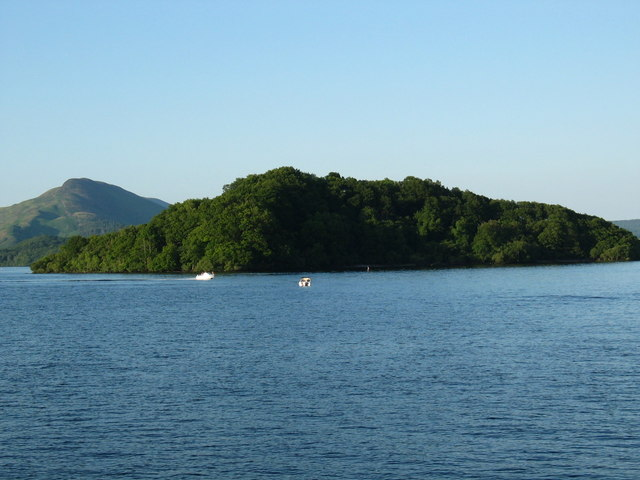
Creinch

Creinch (Scottish Gaelic: Craobh-Innis, Tree Island) is an island on the Highland Boundary Fault in Loch Lomond.

== History ==
Formerly Inchcroin (not to be confused with Inchcruin), Creinch lies a little north of Inchmurrin. Inchcailloch, Torrinch, Creinch and Inchmurrin form part of the Highland boundary fault. In 1800 Garnett referred to the island as 'Grange'.

== Wildlife ==
As the Gaelic name implies, it is completely covered in ivy draped trees, including some wych elms. In summer it can be difficult to penetrate the interior and in spring, it is carpeted in wild garlic, wild hyacinths and wood anemones.
