= Inchmurrin =

Island in Scotland

Innis Mhearain (Gaelic)

Location
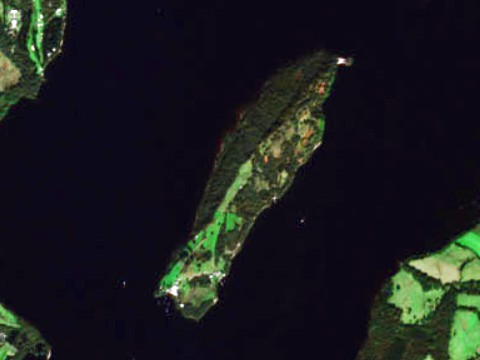
- Satellite image of Inchmurrin

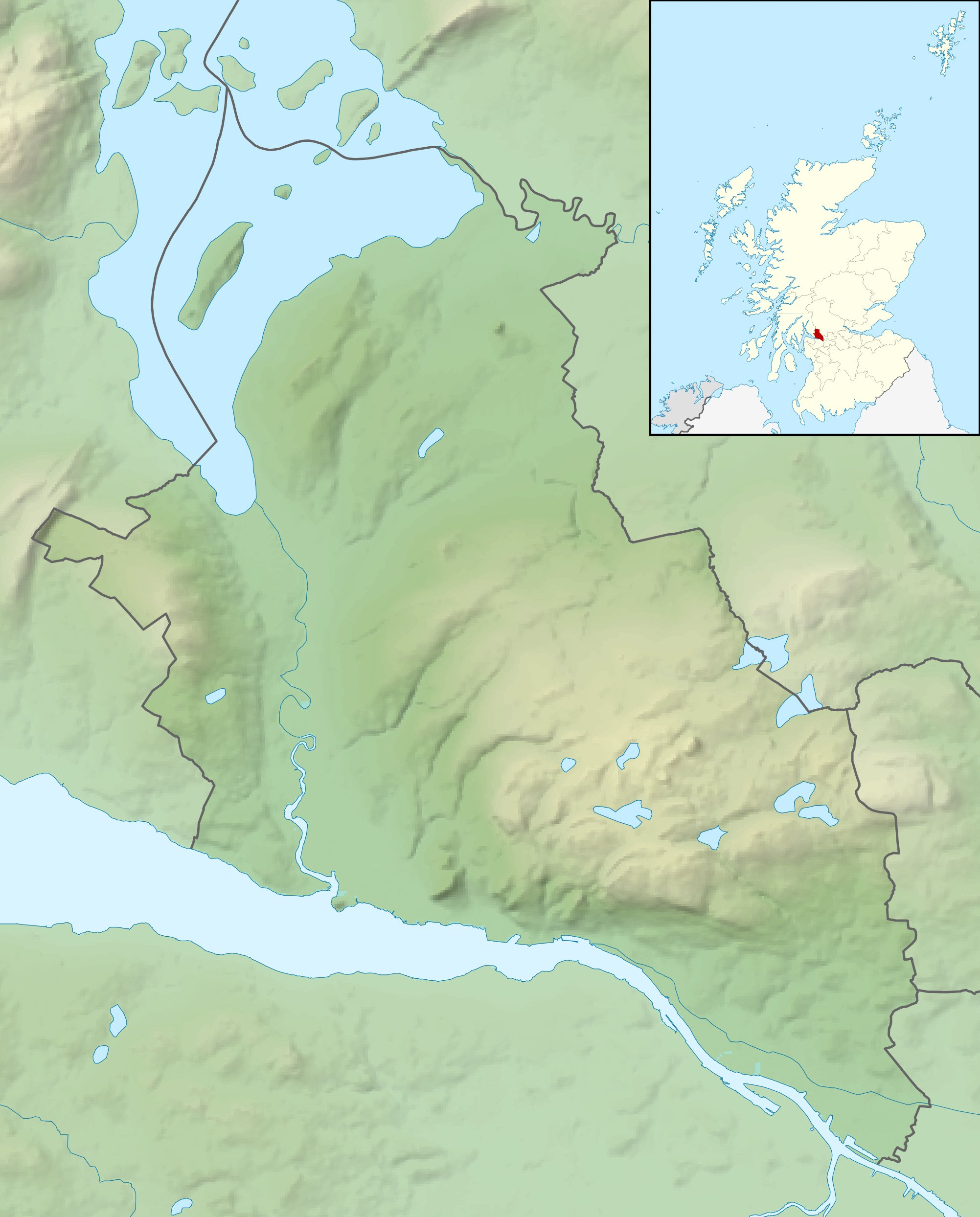
- Inchmurrin shown within West Dunbartonshire
- OS grid reference: NS379871
- Coordinates: 56.05°N 4.60°W

Name
- Name meaning: St Mirin's Island

Physical geography
- Island group: Loch Lomond
- Area: 120 hectares (0.46 sq mi)
- Area rank: 139= (Freshwater: 1)
- Highest elevation: 89 metres (292 ft)

Administration
- Council area: West Dunbartonshire
- Country: Scotland
- Sovereign state: United Kingdom

Demographics
- Population: 10
- Population rank: 67 (Freshwater: 1)
- Population density: 7.5 people/km^{2}

Inchmurrin (Scottish Gaelic: Innis Mhearain) is an island in Loch Lomond in Scotland. It is the largest fresh water island in the British Isles.

== Geography and geology ==
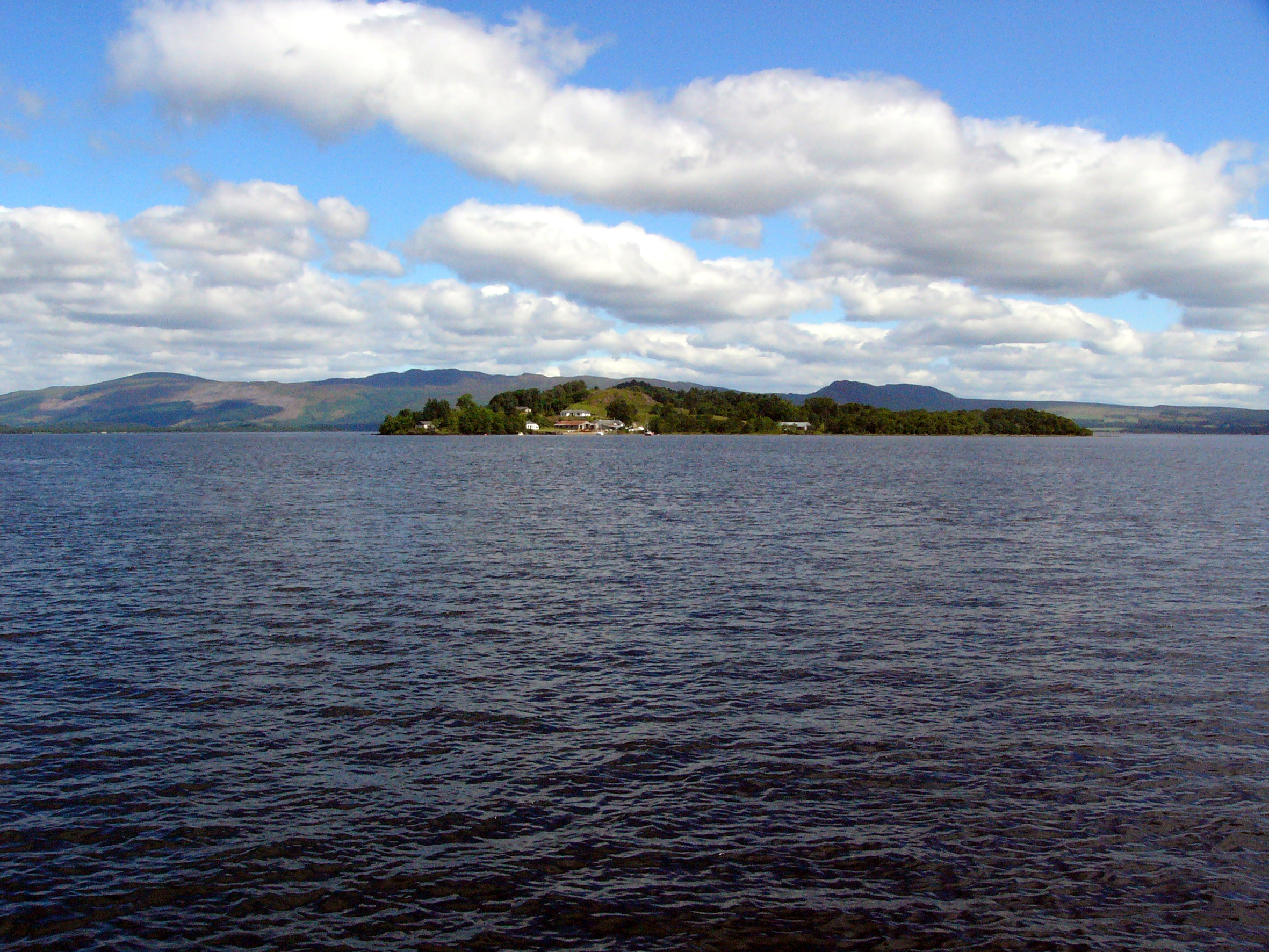
View of Inchmurrin

Inchmurrin is the largest and most southerly of the islands in Loch Lomond. It reaches a height of 89 metres (292 ft) towards the north and is largely wooded. There is an excellent view of the north end of the loch.

Along with Creinch, Torrinch, and Inchcailloch, Inchmurrin forms part of the Highland boundary fault.

== History ==
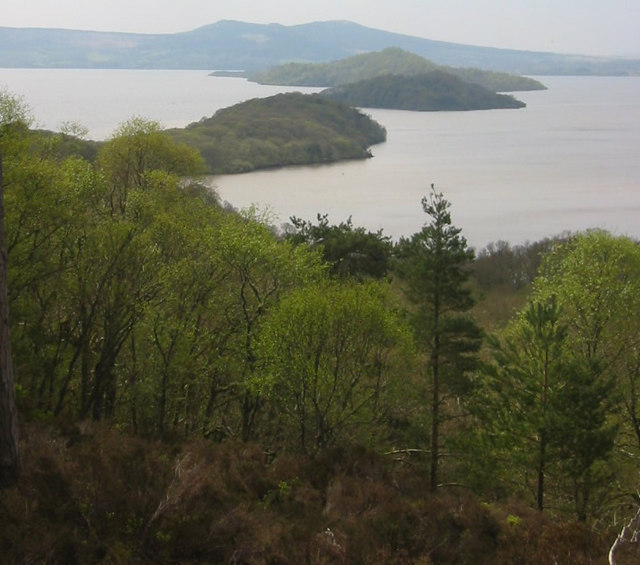
From the summit of Inchcailloch to Torrinch, Creinch, Inchmurrin and Ben Bowie.

Inchmurrin was the site of a 7th-century monastery, with a chapel dedicated to Saint Mirin, after whom it was named.

The island was formerly a deer park of the Dukes of Montrose, who had a hunting lodge built in 1793 and maintained a gamekeeper and his family there. 200 deer are recorded in 1800. There are ruins of a castle, probably built for Duncan, 8th Earl of Lennox whose seat was Balloch Castle at the south end of Loch Lomond. The castle was probably a hunting lodge for the deer park established on the island by King Robert I of Scotland in the early 14th century. After her husband Murdoch Stewart, Duke of Albany, father Donnchadh, Earl of Lennox, and two sons were executed by James I in 1425, Isabella Countess of Lennox retired to the castle on Inchmurrin with her grandchildren.

In 1417, Iain Colquhoun of Luss was killed here by robbers. Sir John Colquhoun of Luss, governor of Dumbarton Castle, was murdered at Inchmurrin in 1439, during a raid led by Lachlan MacLean.

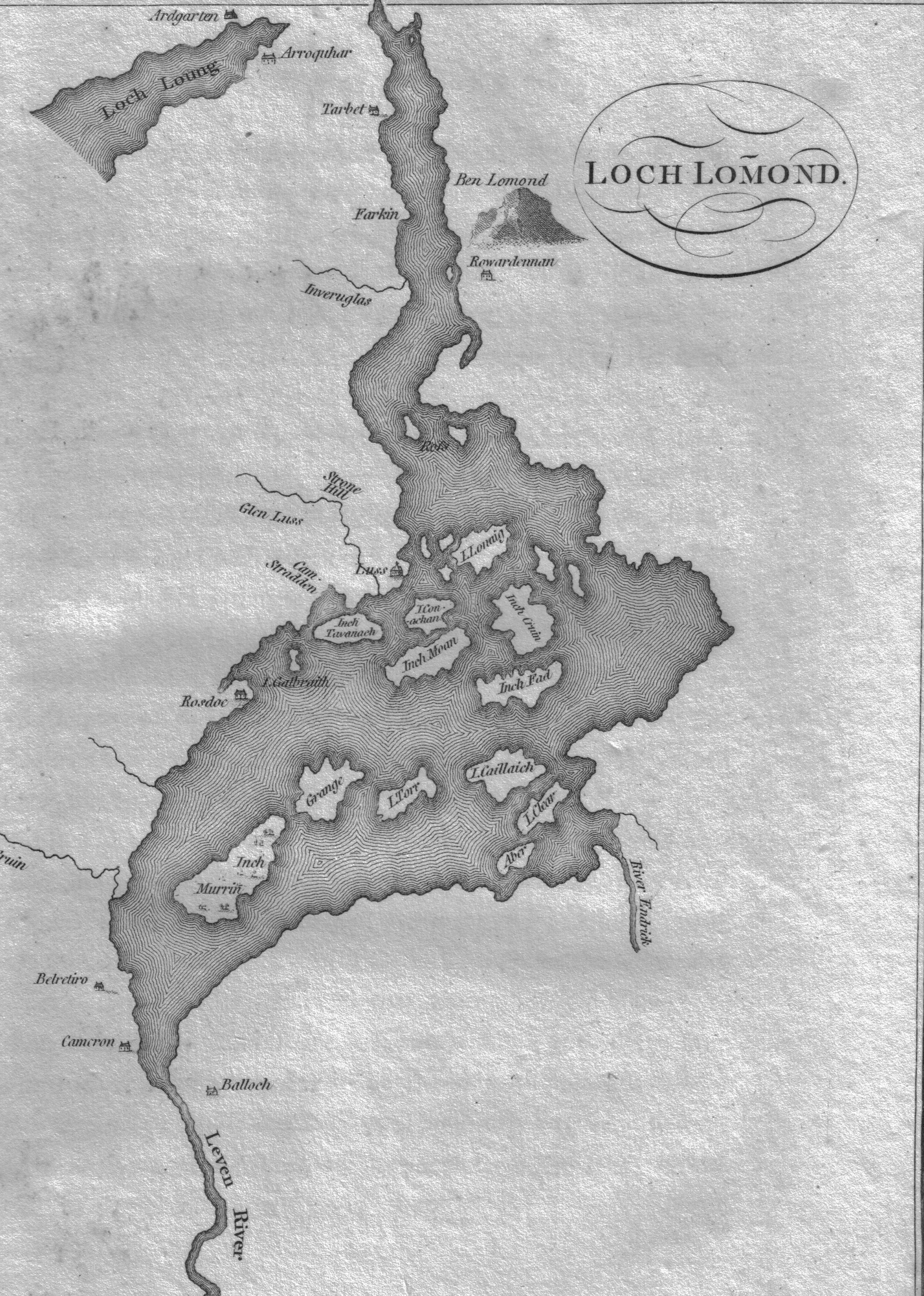
A map from the 1800s showing the islands of Loch Lomond.

King James VI came to Inchmurrin on a hunting trip in August 1585 with the English diplomat Edward Wotton, while there was plague in Edinburgh and St Andrews. In July 1599, a French ambassador, Monsieur de Béthune, brother of the Duke of Sully, went on a hunting progress with James VI from Falkland Palace to Inchmurrin and Hamilton Palace. In 1617 King James made his only return visit to Scotland, and included a hunting trip to Inchmurrin in his itinerary. The Duke of Lennox wrote to the custodian of the island on 23 July 1617, asking for food to be prepared for "a good nombre of sharpe stomaches", probably a reference to the hunting trip.

Rob Roy raided the island. At one point, his men came to control all the boats on the River Endrick and Loch Lomond, which were later used to remove cattle from Inchmurrin.

Inchmurrin was used as a mental asylum, and also unmarried pregnant women were sent here to give birth.

The English travel writer, H.V. Morton visited Inchmurrin in the 1930s and described it as "the grassy isle, an island packed with memories."

The island has been owned by the Scott family for over 70 years. They farm it and run self-catering apartments, a cottage, and restaurant. They used to have a sign at the jetty saying, "You are now entering Scott Country".

The World Record for haggis hurling was held by Alan Pettigrew for over 20 years. He threw a 1 lb 8 oz (680 g) haggis 180 ft 10 in (55.12 m) on Inchmurrin in August 1984. However this was beaten when a new record was set at 217 ft (66 m) by Lorne Coltart at the Milngavie Highland Games on 11 June 2011.

== Facilities ==
As well as offering self catered accommodation in the form of 3 flats and an 8-person cottage, the island has its own bar and restaurant, open from Easter to October. Inchmurrin is licensed to hold civil ceremonies.

There is a naturist camp in the north east of the island.

== See also ==
- List of islands of Scotland
