= Highland Boundary Fault =

Geological fault zone crossing Scotland

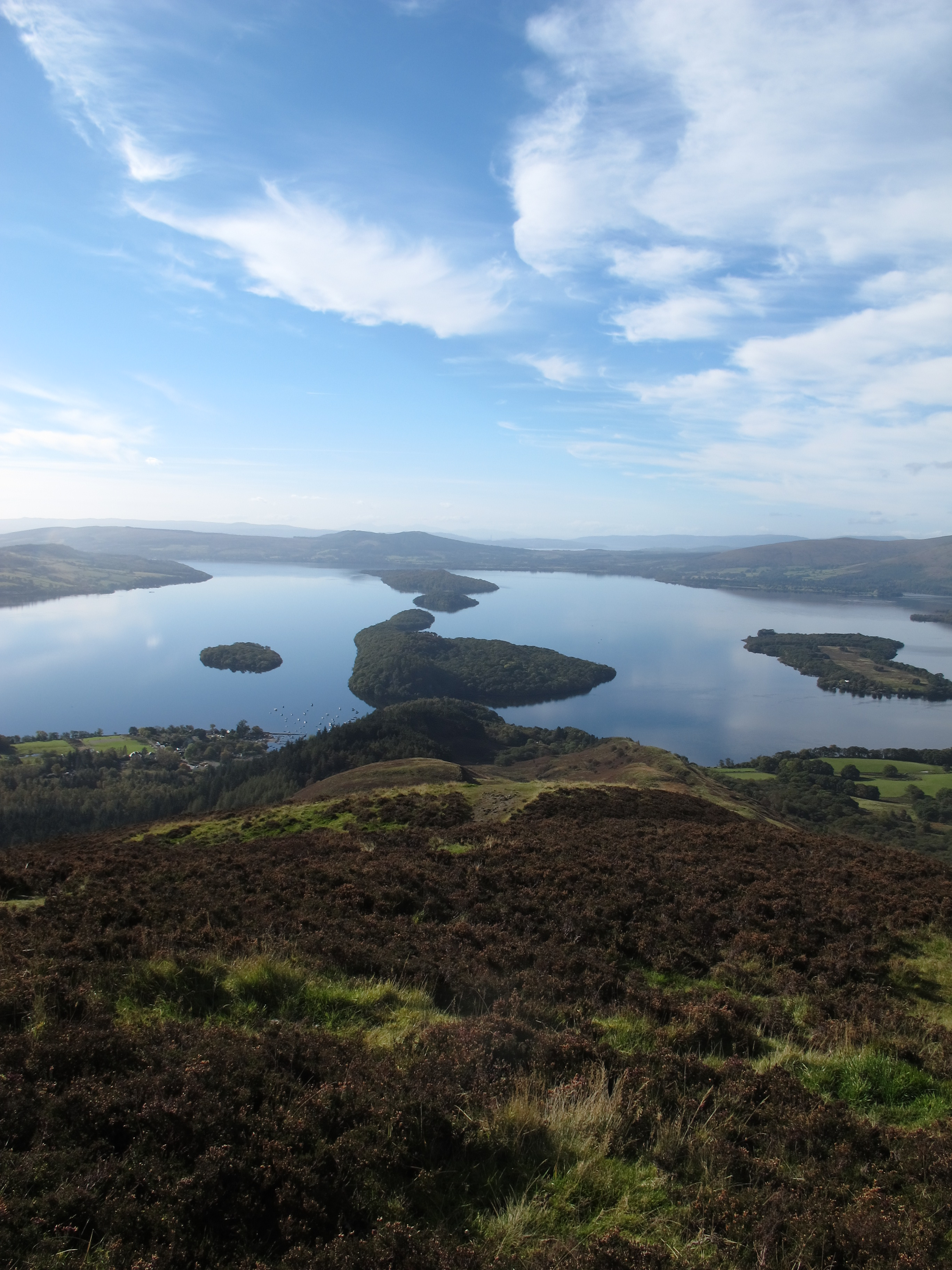
View along the Highland Boundary Fault from Conic Hill – the topographic ridge is mainly due to the presence of Devonian age conglomerates on the southwestern side of the fault and can be traced across Loch Lomond on the islands of Inchcailloch, Torrinch, Creinch and Inchmurrin, to Ben Bowie on the western shore

The Highland Boundary Fault is a major fault zone that traverses Scotland from Arran and Helensburgh on the west coast to Stonehaven in the east. It separates two different geological terranes that give rise to two distinct physiographic terrains: the Highlands and the Lowlands. In most places, it is recognisable as a change in topography. Where rivers cross the fault, they often pass through gorges; the associated waterfalls can be a barrier to salmon migration.

The fault is believed to have formed in conjunction with the Strathmore syncline to the south-east during the Acadian orogeny in a transpressive regime that caused the uplift of the Grampian block and a small sinistral movement on the Highland Boundary Fault.

== Discovery ==
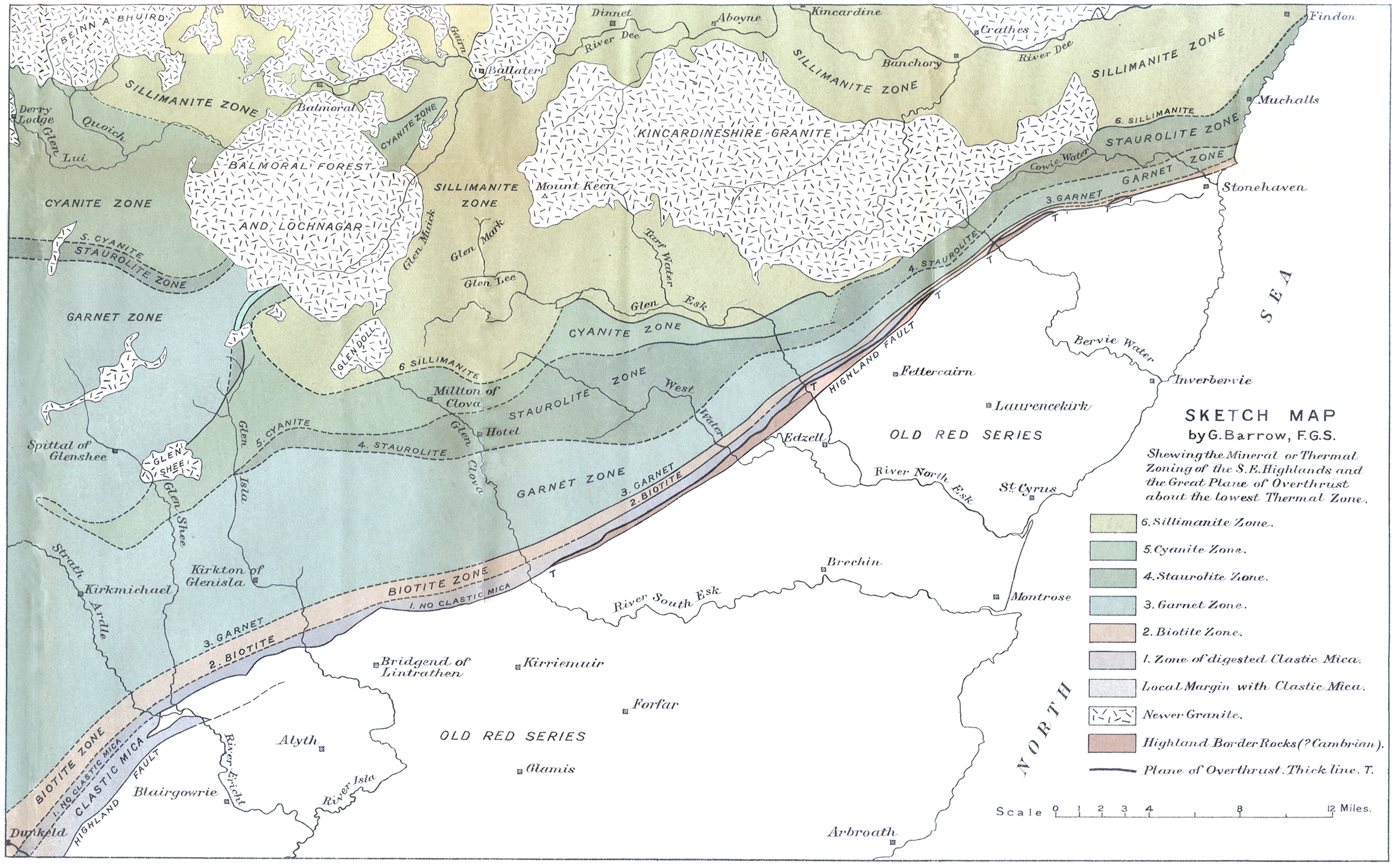
Map published in 1912 by George Barrow showing what became known as the Highland Boundary Fault

One of the earliest and most prominent references to the Highland Boundary Fault was by George Barrow in 1912 ʻOn the Geology of Lower Dee-side and the Southern Highland Borderʼ, which highlights the nature of the rocks accompanying the Highland Border and describes the mineral zones associated with metamorphism. In the same publication, Barrow also outlines the ʻHighland Faultʼ and the areas where he believes there are planes of overthrust. Barrowʼs description of the structural nature of the rocks along the Highland Border suggests that rocks along both ends of the fault plane are indistinguishable from one another, with no brecciation.

== Extent of fault ==
Aligned southwest to northeast from Lochranza on Arran, the Highland Boundary Fault bisects Bute and crosses the southeastern parts of the Cowal and Rosneath peninsulas, as it passes up the Firth of Clyde. It comes ashore near Helensburgh, then continues through Loch Lomond. The loch islands of Inchmurrin, Creinch, Torrinch, and Inchcailloch all lie on the Highland Boundary Fault. From Loch Lomond the Highland Boundary Fault continues to Aberfoyle, then Callander, Comrie and Crieff. It then forms the northern boundary of Strathmore and reaches the North Sea immediately north of Stonehaven near the ruined Chapel of St. Mary and St. Nathalan. Aeromagnetic maps of Great Britain and Northern Ireland show that the Highland Boundary Fault can be traced from Ireland to the region of Greenock. In these areas, the Highland Boundary Fault is seen to be dividing a northerly low area from a southerly high area. The fault is often considered a terrane boundary: the Midland Valley terrane lies to the south whilst the Southern Highlands or Grampian terrane lies to the north In 1970, Hall and Dagley identified the Highland Boundary Fault as coincident with a regional magnetic feature dividing a string of negative anomalies in the north from positive ones in the south. On discovering this, Hall and Dagley concluded that the observed trend, which followed the length of the Dalradian trough, transition from positive to negative anomalies. This linear feature of magnetic anomalies has since been referred to as the Fair Head–Clew Bay line.

== Features ==
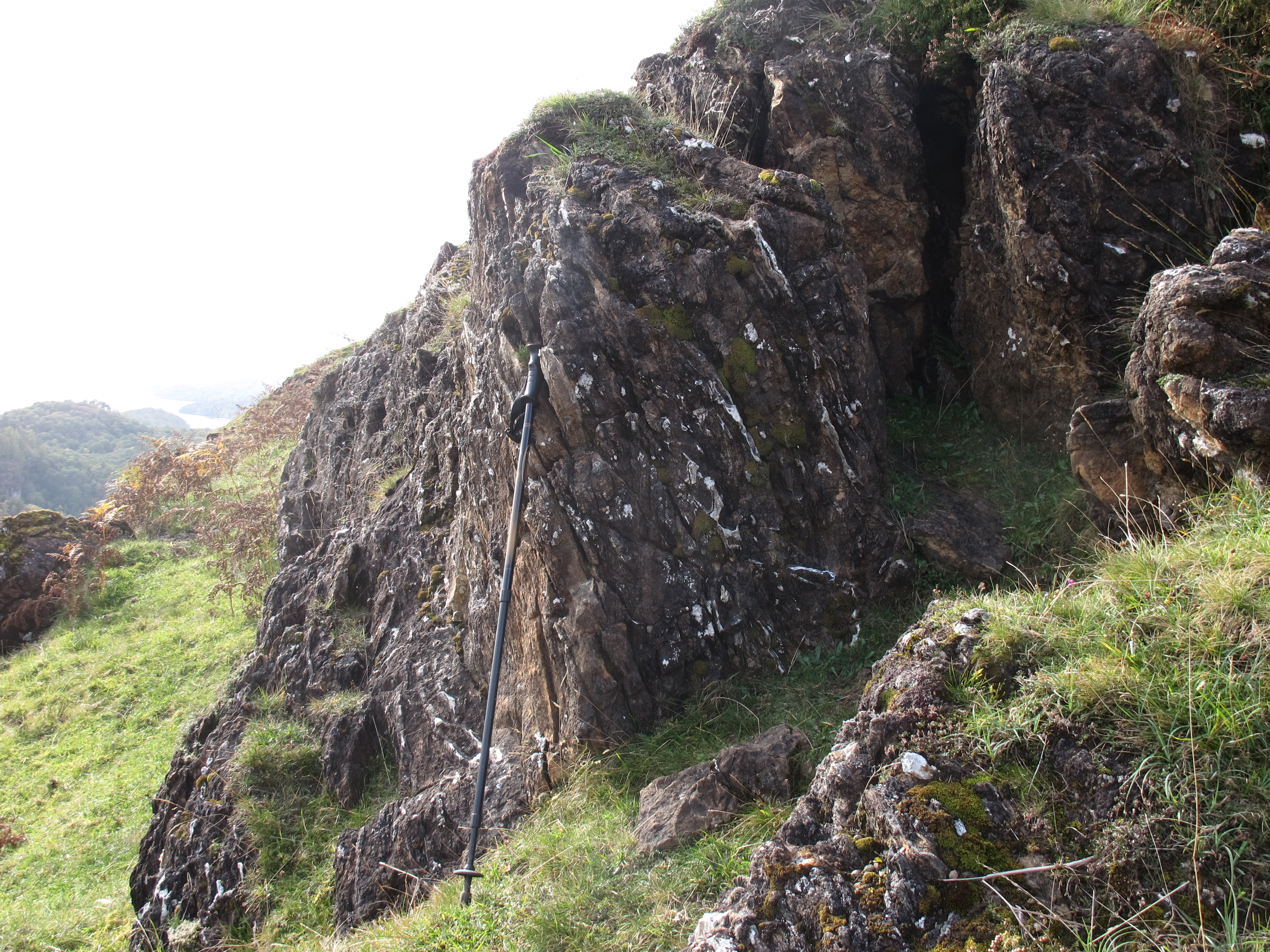
Altered serpentinite and associated sediments of the Highland Border Complex caught up in the fault zone – exposed on Druim nam Buraich, near Balmaha

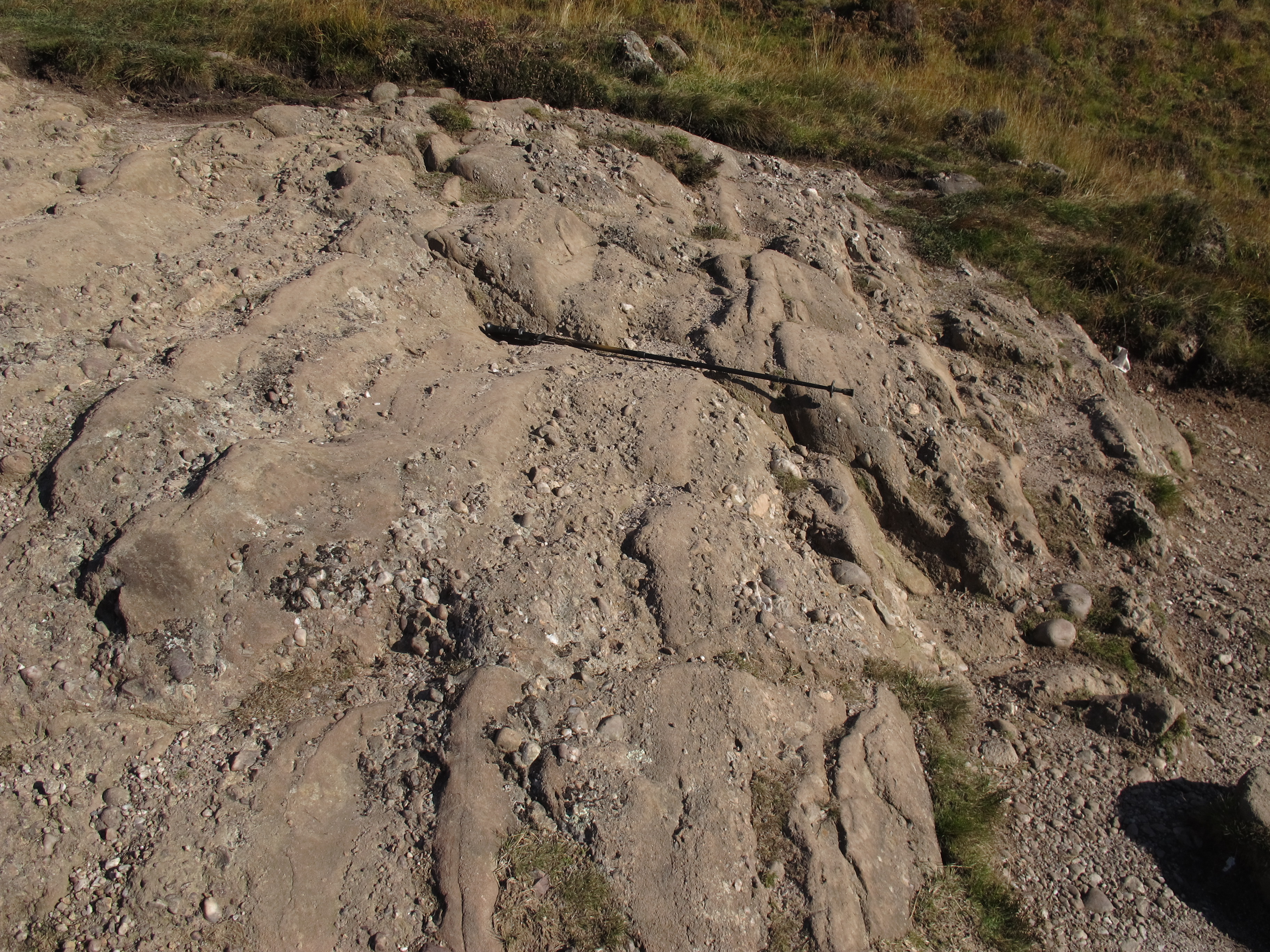
Lower Devonian sandstones and conglomerates of the Inchmurrin Member dipping steeply to the southeast close to the Highland Boundary Fault trace near Balmaha

=== Tectonic controversy ===
At present, it is believed that the Highland Boundary Fault was active during two main orogenic events associated with the Caledonian orogeny: the Grampian orogeny in the Early Ordovician and the Acadian orogeny in the Middle Devonian. The fault allowed the Midland Valley to descend as a major rift by up to 4,000 m (13,000 ft) and there was subsequent vertical movement. This earlier vertical movement was later replaced by a horizontal shear. A complementary fault, the Southern Uplands Fault, forms the southern boundary for the Central Lowlands. The age of the Highland Boundary Fault has been inferred to be between Ordovician to middle Devonian and through several generations it has been interpreted as a graben-bounding normal fault, a major sinistral strike-slip fault, a northwest-dipping reverse fault or terrane boundary. The reason the precise nature of the fault is still unknown is because there is little evidence of a continuous fault plane on the surface. More recently, seismic activities marking the fault line have been analysed to show that the 2003 Aberfoyle earthquake had a hypocentre at 4 km (2 1/2 mi) depth and was caused by an oblique sinistral strike-slip fault with normal movement. The fault plane was estimated to be dipping at 65° NW.

=== Associated lithology ===
To the north and west of the Highland Boundary Fault lie hard Precambrian and Cambrian metamorphic rocks: marine deposits metamorphosed to schists, phyllites and slates, namely the Dalradian Supergroup and the Highland Border Ophiolite suite. To the south and east are Old Red Sandstone conglomerates and sandstones: softer, sedimentary rocks of the Devonian and Carboniferous periods. Between these areas lie the quite different rocks of the Highland Border Complex (at one time called the Highland Boundary Complex), a weakly metamorphosed sedimentary sequence of sandstones, lavas, limestones, mudstones and conglomerates. These make up a zone which is found discontinuously along the line of the fault and which is up to 1.2 kilometres (3/4 mi) in width.

==== Dalradian Supergroup ====
The Dalradian Supergroup consists of metasedimentary rocks which underwent polyphase deformation and metamorphism during the Precambrian and early Paleozoic. The oldest Dalradian rocks (the Grampian Group) were deformed and metamorphosed around 750 Ma. The deposition of younger Dalradian sediments continued until 590 Ma, when the sediments underwent transformation to the greenschist facies during the Proterozoic and Ordovician.

==== Highland Border Ophiolitic Rocks ====
Modeling of gravity and magnetic data along the fault has confirmed the presence of an extensive ophiolite suite. The Dalradian metasedimentary rocks are overlain by an obducted ophiolite that is continuous for at least several kilometres on either side of the Highland Boundary Fault. The models generated from magnetic data suggest that the ophiolite is only slightly displaced vertically by the fault.

==== Old Red Sandstone ====
The Old Red Sandstone is a magnafacies of red beds and lacustrine deposits from the Late Silurian to the Carboniferous. The NE segment of the Highland Boundary Fault is marked by an abrupt change in the dip of the Old Red Sandstone from around 20° to near-vertical and subsequently exposes the Old Red Sandstone basement.

== Displacement along fault ==
It is currently believed that there were two main displacement events along the Highland Boundary Fault: the Acadian, and the post-Acadian.

Evidence for the Acadian displacement event is based on the geochemical study of detrital garnets in the Lower Old Red Sandstone on the Northern limb of the Strathmore Basin. These garnets were linked to those in isolated Dalradian sediments in the northwest, providing evidence for post-Early Devonian (Acadian) movement to be only few tens of kilometers.

In addition, the Lintrathen ignimbrite, which is present at the base of the Lower Devonian sequence was traced along the fault and it was found that the displacement was both short and lateral.

The post-Acadian movements are highlighted in the stratigraphy of the region. The Lower Old Red Sandstone is unconformably overlain by Upper Old Red Sandstone, where the Upper Old Red Sandstone is tilted close to the Highland Boundary Fault.

== Red squirrels ==
The boundary is used as a natural barrier to prevent northwards movement of grey squirrels, thus protecting the only red squirrel population in the Highlands.
