= Conic Hill =

Hill in Stirling, Scotland

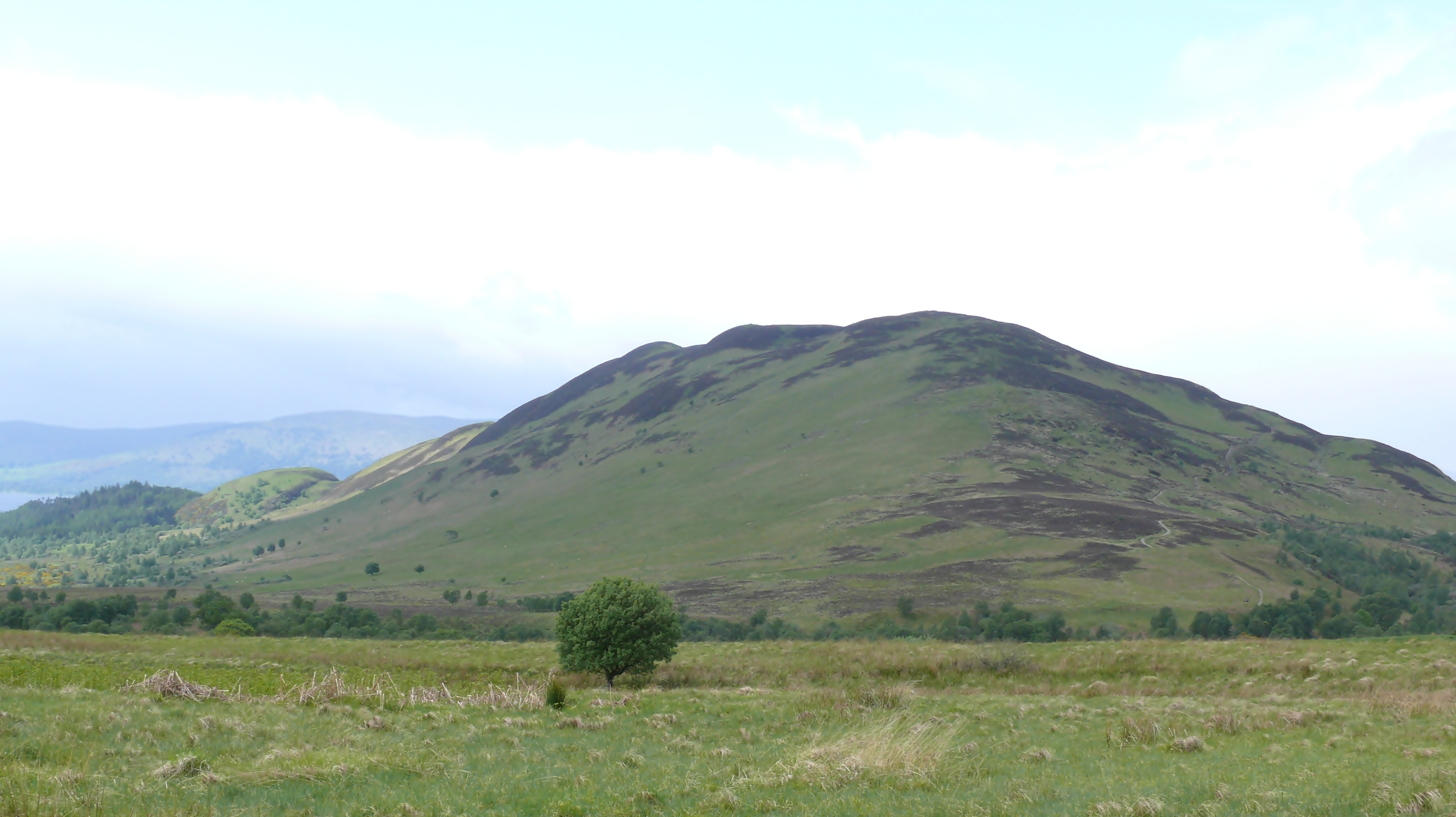

Highest point
- Elevation: 361 m (1,184 ft)
- Prominence: 153 m (502 ft)
- Isolation: 2.07 km (1.29 mi)
- Listing: Marilyn, HuMP, TuMP
- Coordinates: 56°05′49″N 4°31′29″W

Geography
- Location within Scotland
- Location: Stirling, Scotland
- Parent range: Grampian Mountains
- OS grid: NS432923
- Topo map(s): OS Landranger 56 and Explorer 364

Conic Hill (from Gaelic "còinneach" meaning moss) is a prominent hill in Stirling, Scotland.

== Location and description ==
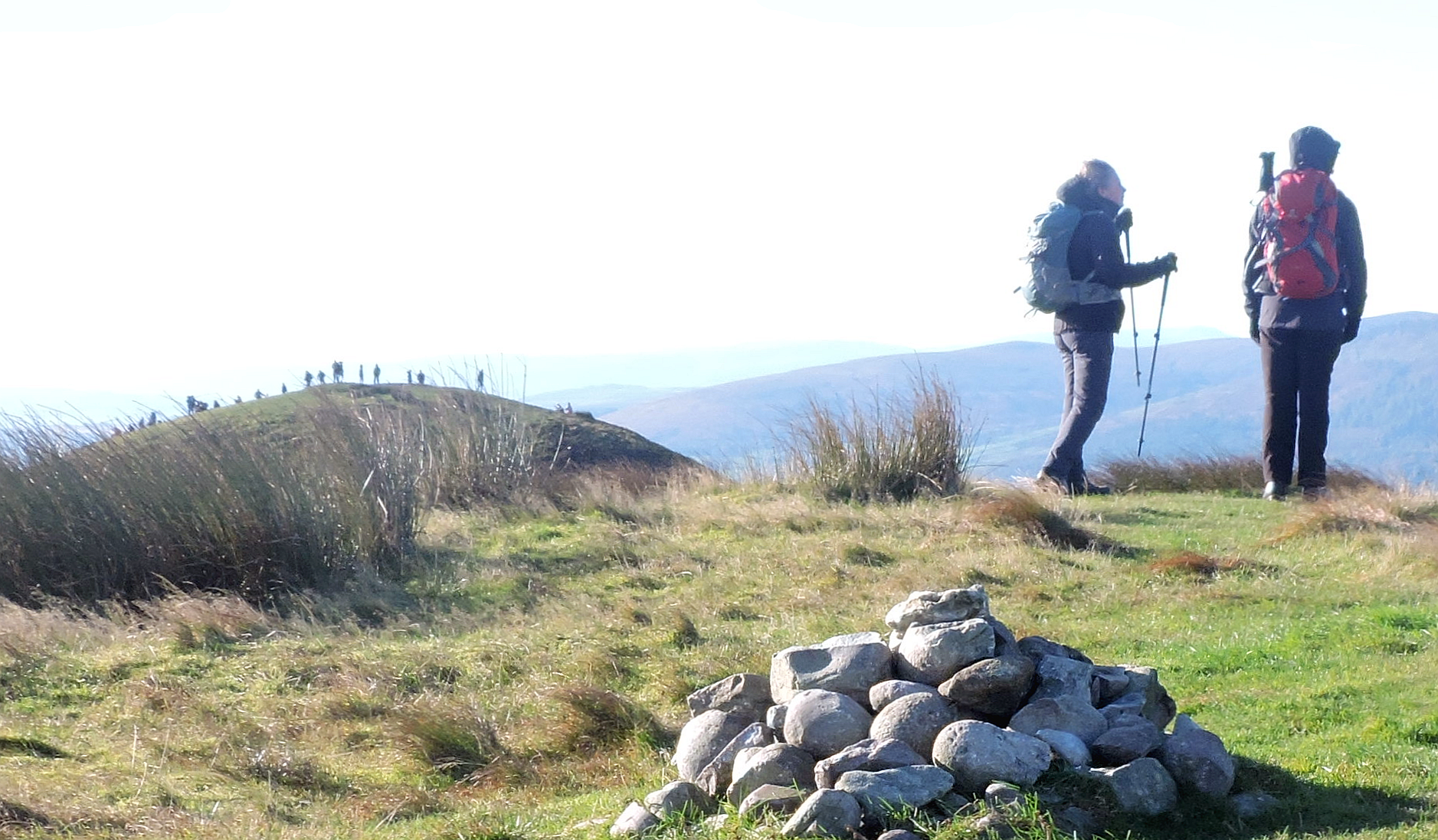
The summit of Conic Hill with; in the background its sub-summit at 361 m (1,184 ft)

It is on the east bank of Loch Lomond, beside the village of Balmaha. It is a sharp little summit which is on the Highland Boundary Fault. There is a cairn at the top. Most visitors also stop on a sub-summit at 361 m (1,184 ft).

== Views ==
From the top, it offers impressive views over Loch Lomond and towards Glasgow; on a clear day it is even possible to see Goat Fell on Arran, about 50 miles (80 kilometres) southwest. In addition, the rounded outline of Ailsa Craig in the Clyde Estuary is sometimes visible.

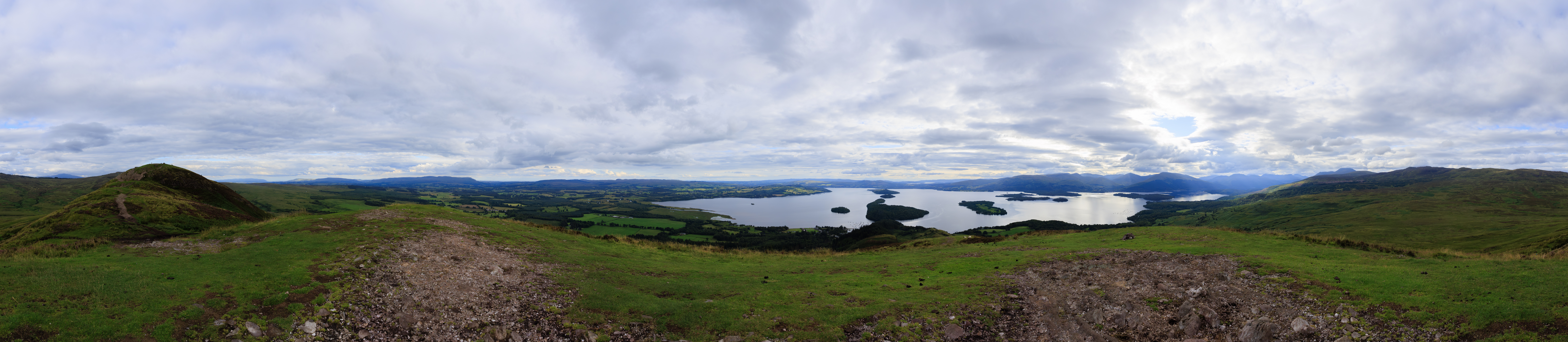
A panorama taken at the sub-summit of Conic Hill.

== Ascent ==
It is accessible for walking, and forms part of the West Highland Way. During the lambing season, dogs are not allowed in the two enclosed fields on the east approach to Conic Hill, even if they are on a lead. The season normally lasts for around three weeks at the end of April and early May. However, this does not affect access with a dog to Conic Hill from the Balmaha direction.

The hill is accessible by public transport, with buses and ferries arriving in Balmaha. There is also a car park at the base, allowing those with vehicles a place to park before climbing the hill.

In August 2013, 8 members of Deafblind Scotland ascended the hill with help from rangers and guides.
