= Balmaha =

Coordinates: 56.084°N 4.540°W

Balmaha: Scottish Gaelic: Baile Mo Thatha
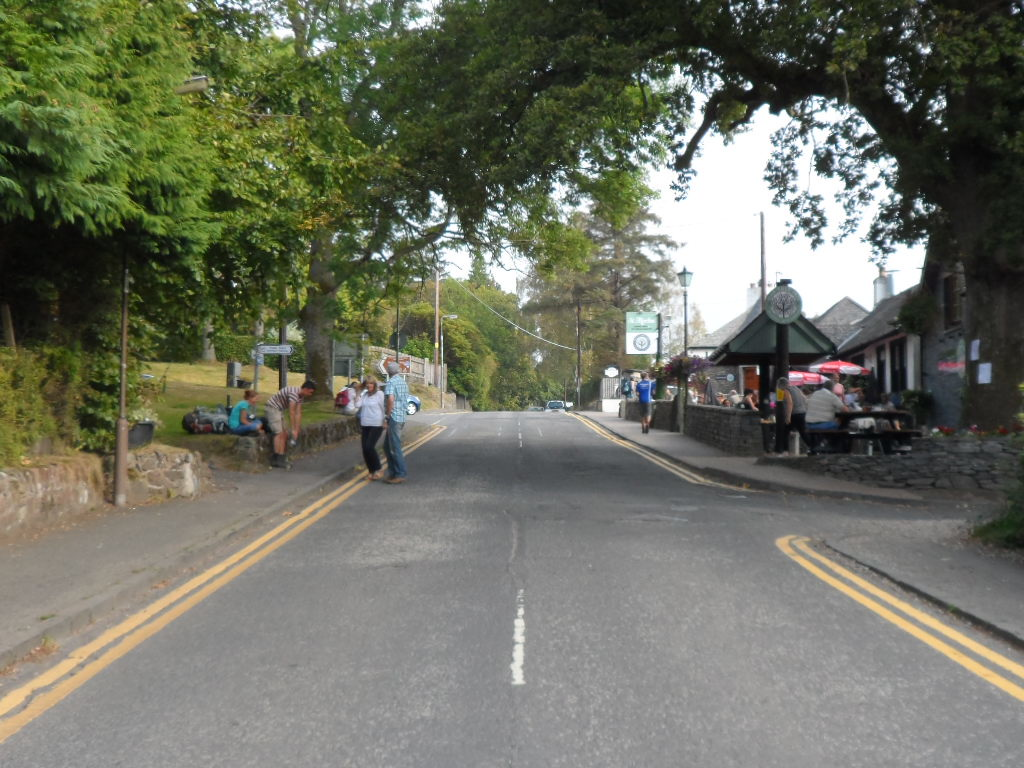
- The Main Street in Balmaha

- Location within the Stirling council area
- Population: 60 (approximately)
- OS grid reference: NS420909
- Civil parish: Buchanan
- Council area: Stirling
- Lieutenancy area: Stirling and Falkirk
- Country: Scotland
- Sovereign state: United Kingdom
- Post town: Glasgow
- Postcode district: G63
- Dialling code: 01360
- Police: Scotland
- Fire: Scottish
- Ambulance: Scottish
- UK Parliament: Stirling and Strathallan
- Scottish Parliament: Stirling

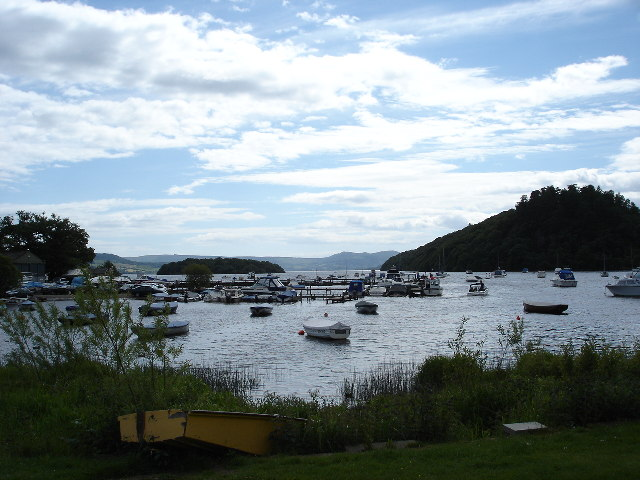
The harbor and Macfarlane and Son Boatyard on Loch Lomond at Balmaha

Balmaha (Gaelic: Baile Mo Thatha) is a village on the eastern shore of Loch Lomond in the council area of Stirling, Scotland.

The village is a popular tourist destination for picnickers and day trippers from Glasgow as well as walkers on the West Highland Way. The only road passing through the village is the B837. Boat trips leave from Balmaha for the town of Balloch and the village of Luss as well as nearby Inchcailloch Island.

Balmaha sits at the westerly foot of Conic Hill, and is roughly 30 kilometres (20 miles) along the West Highland Way if coming from Milngavie.

== Etymology ==
The name Balmaha derives from the Gaelic Bealach Mo-Cha, 'the pass of Saint Mo-Cha'. The pass referred to is now named The Pass of Balmaha, a narrow route between hills at the north end of the village, carrying the road north along Loch Lomond. The saint referred to is Kentigerna, patron saint of the parish who was revered especially on the nearby island of Inchcailloch ('Island of Nuns'). Mo-Cha is a 'hypocoristic' form of her name, a sort of devotional nickname, common in medieval Gaelic and Welsh use. She is also commemorated in a well in the hills above the village, St Maha's Well.

== Climate ==
Balmaha has an oceanic climate (Köppen: Cfb). There is a Met Office weather station located at Arrochymore, around 1 km (5/8 mi) to the north.

Climate data for Arrochymore (30 m or 98 ft asl, averages 1991–2020)
Month	Jan	Feb	Mar	Apr	May	Jun	Jul	Aug	Sep	Oct	Nov	Dec	Year
Mean daily maximum °C (°F)	7.2 (45.0)	7.7 (45.9)	9.3 (48.7)	12.2 (54.0)	15.4 (59.7)	17.7 (63.9)	19.2 (66.6)	18.8 (65.8)	16.5 (61.7)	13.0 (55.4)	9.7 (49.5)	7.4 (45.3)	12.9 (55.2)
Mean daily minimum °C (°F)	1.5 (34.7)	1.5 (34.7)	2.3 (36.1)	4.0 (39.2)	6.4 (43.5)	9.1 (48.4)	11.1 (52.0)	10.6 (51.1)	8.9 (48.0)	6.2 (43.2)	3.6 (38.5)	1.4 (34.5)	5.6 (42.1)
Average rainfall mm (inches)	211.7 (8.33)	158.0 (6.22)	149.9 (5.90)	90.7 (3.57)	84.5 (3.33)	101.9 (4.01)	121.2 (4.77)	131.2 (5.17)	143.2 (5.64)	185.2 (7.29)	181.7 (7.15)	212.5 (8.37)	1,771.7 (69.75)
Mean monthly sunshine hours	31.6	59.3	91.9	142.7	178.0	152.1	140.8	133.6	102.4	76.7	43.3	27.1	1,179.4
Source: Met Office

== Facilities ==
The village previously had a visitor centre for the Queen Elizabeth Forest Park, currently defunct. It also has a restaurant and bed and breakfast, the Oak Tree Inn, a bar and a shop, as well as several smaller accommodation premises nearby due to its position on the West Highland Way and its popularity with daytrippers. It is also the home of St Mocha coffee shop and ice cream parlour.

The Macfarlane and Son Boatyard is found in Balmaha; the boatyard was established over 150 years ago by John Macfarlane and has been in the family ever since. The boatyard currently runs a ferry service over to Inch Cailloch and around the loch for visitors, as well as delivering the mail to inhabited islands.

Further along the road is Milarrochy Bay.
