= Caintigern =

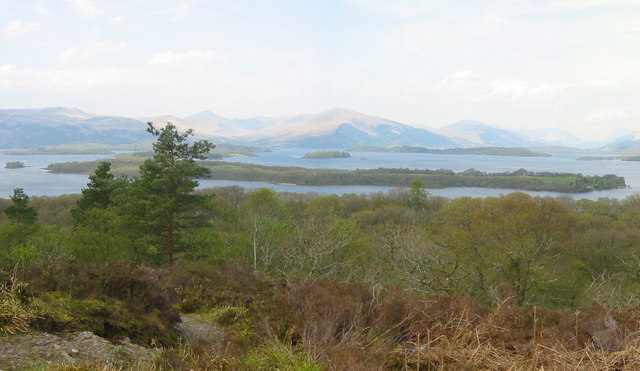
Inchcailloch (Old Irish: Innis na Cailleach; island of the old woman), burial place of Saint Kentigerna

Caintigern (died 734), or Saint Kentigerna, was a daughter of Cellach Cualann, King of Leinster. Her feast is listed in the Aberdeen Breviary for 7 January, and this is also her feast day in the Eastern Orthodox Church.

Her husband is said to have been Feriacus regulus of Monchestre, who possibly is the same person as Feradach, grandson of Artúr of Dál Riata.

Along with her brother St. Comgán and her son St. Fillan (Fáelán), the widowed Caintigern is said to have lived as a hermit, first in Strath Fillan, then in the Lennox, on the island of Inchcailloch on Loch Lomond.

== Sources ==
- Alan Orr Anderson, Early Sources of Scottish History A.D 500–1286, volume 1. Reprinted with corrections. Paul Watkins, Stamford, 1990. ISBN 1-871615-03-8
- Doherty, Charles (2004). "Cellach Cualann (d. 715)". Oxford Dictionary of National Biography (online ed.). Oxford University Press. doi:10.1093/ref:odnb/50090. (Subscription or UK public library membership required.)
