= Wild hyacinth =

Wild hyacinth may refer to:

- Hyacinthoides non-scripta, a European species also called the common bluebell
- Camassia, a genus of six North American species
- Dipterostemon capitatus, a species from North America, the only species in the genus Dipterostemon
- Dichelostemma multiflorum, a species from California and Oregon
- Lachenalia contaminata, a species from South Africa
- various species of Brodiaea, from western North America
