= Torrinch =

Island in Loch Lomond, West Dunbartonshire, Scotland

Coordinates: 56°4′12″N 4°34′7″W

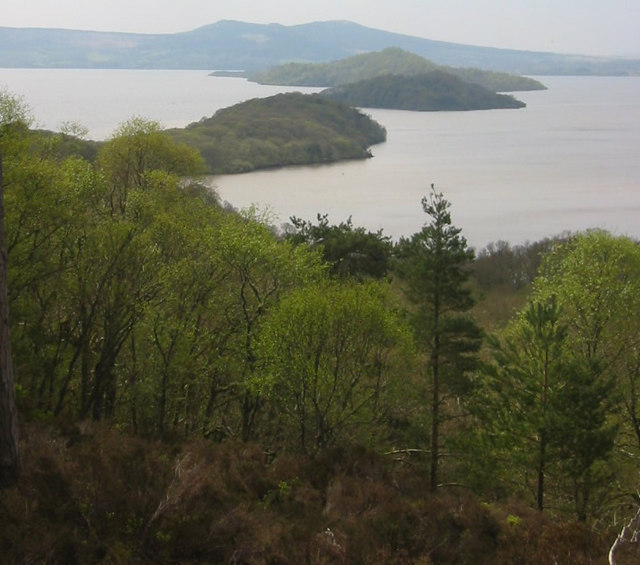
From the summit of the island of Inchcailloch to Torrinch, Creinch, Inchmurrin and Ben Bowie.

Torrinch or Inchtore (Scottish Gaelic: Torr-Innis) is a wooded island in Loch Lomond in Scotland. The name Torremach is also recorded for it.

== Geography ==
It is one of the smaller islands in the loch. Torrinch, along with Inchmurrin, Creinch, and Inchcailloch, forms part of the Highland Boundary Fault. In the 1800s it was covered with oaks.

It lies just to the south-west of the larger island of Inchcailloch, and north-east of Creinch.
