= Milarrochy Bay =

Bay in Loch Lomond, Stirling, Scotland

Coordinates: 56°5′59″N 4°33′38″W

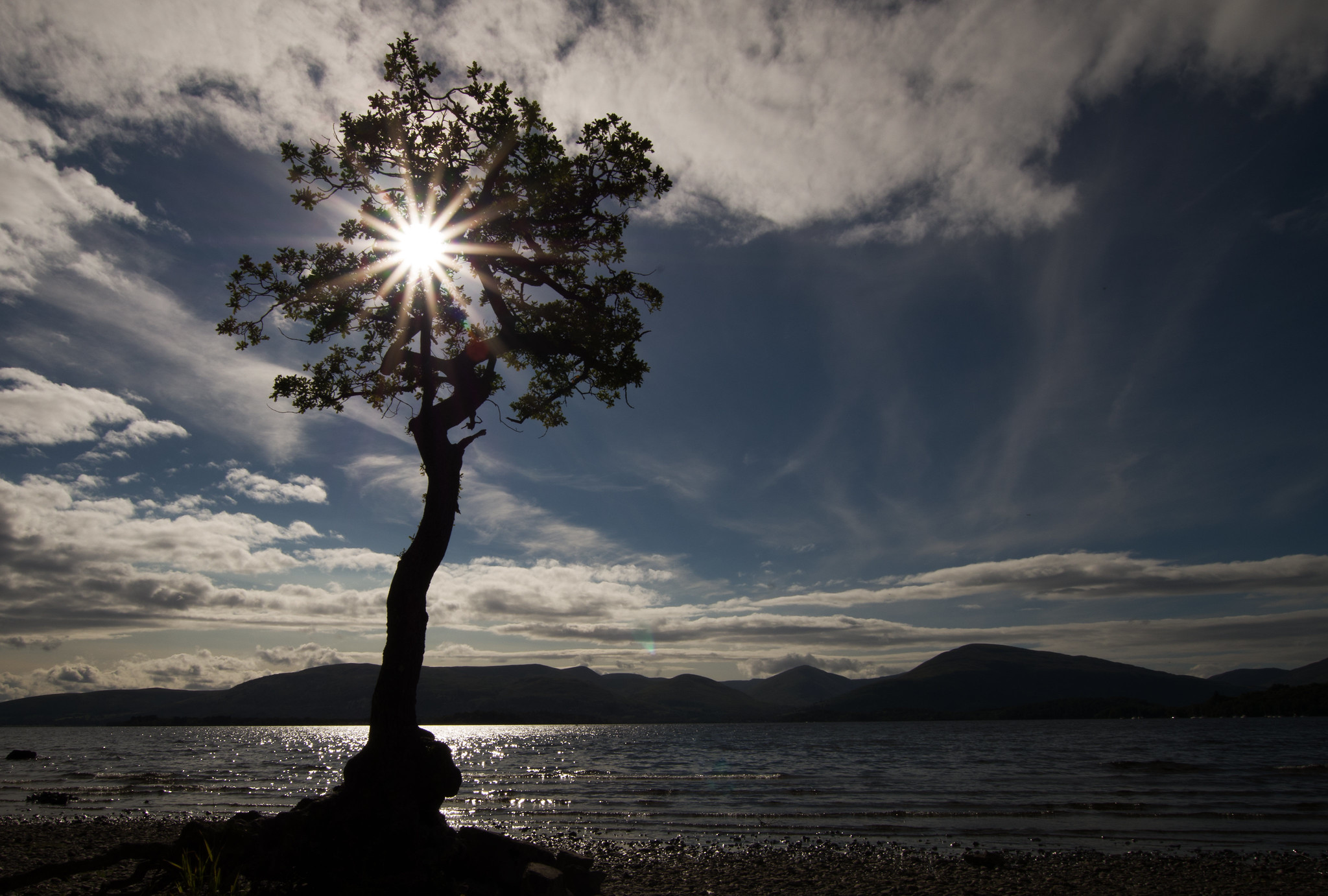
The "Lone Tree" at Milarrochy Bay, photo taken by Sue Langford

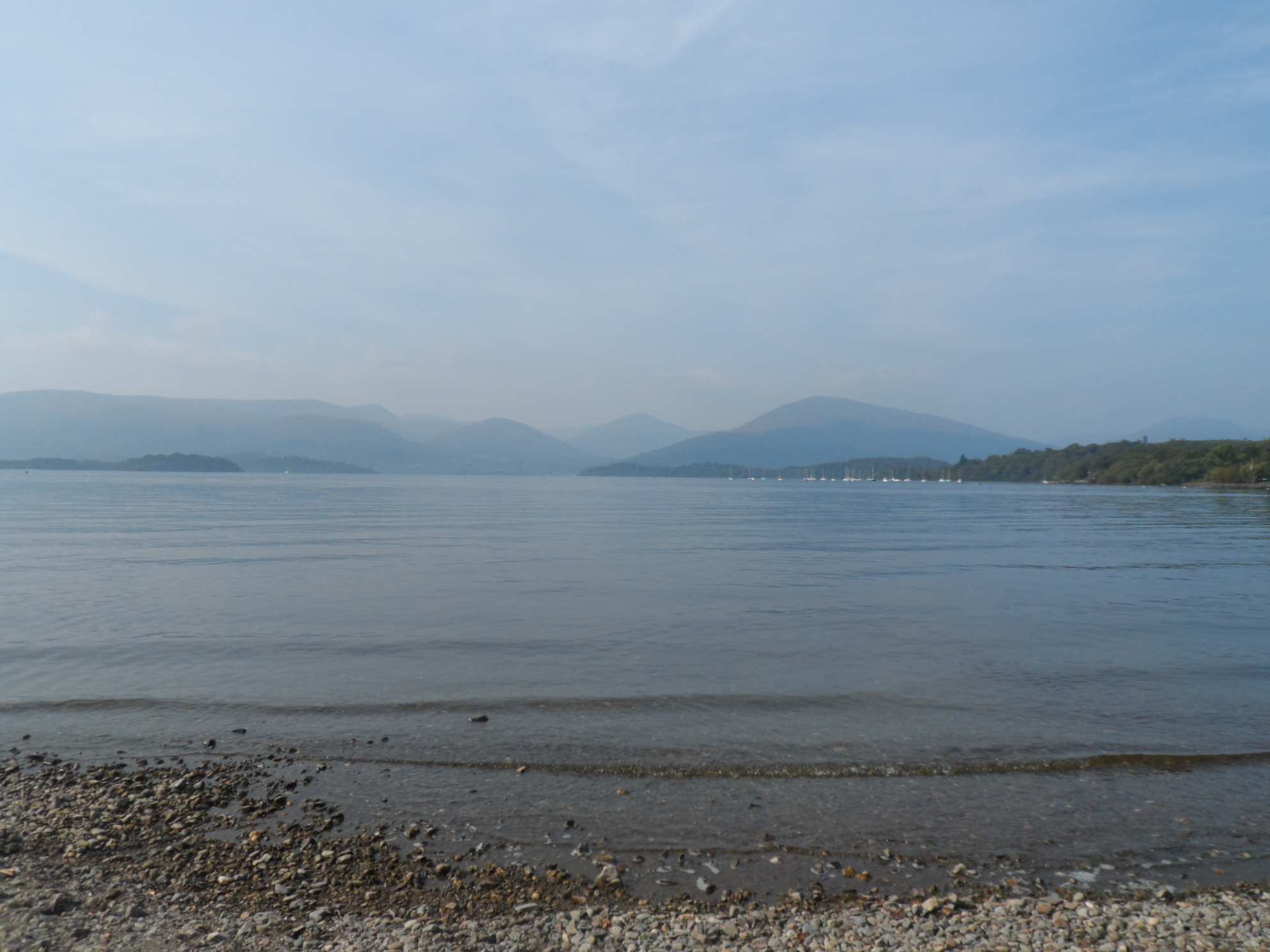
Looking across to Argyll and Bute on Milarrochy Bay

Milarrochy Bay is a bay on Loch Lomond, in central Scotland. It is near the village of Balmaha. Known locally as Bakey Bay, due to the rounded mounds regularly on display.

There are a few houses near the bay. Other bays on the east of Loch Lomond include Cashel Bay and Sallochy Bay. The bay has a visitor centre with leaflets about Loch Lomond and The Trossachs National Park and the surrounding area. There is also a camping and caravanning club site.

The bay is popular with hikers on the West Highland Way, and photographers, who come to capture the famous Milarrochy Bay "lone tree"
