= Loch Lomond =

Loch In Scotland

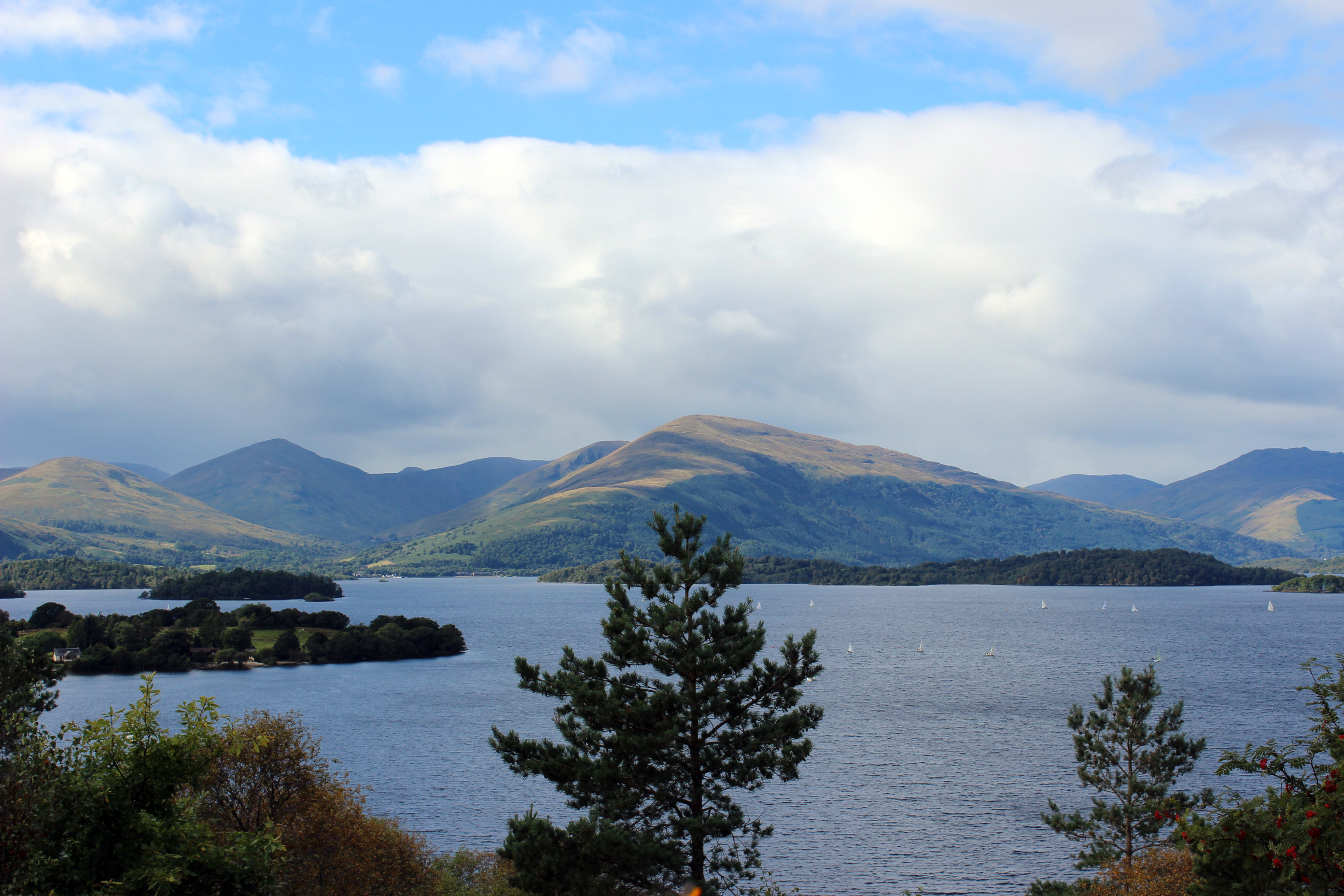
- Part of Loch Lomond in 2013

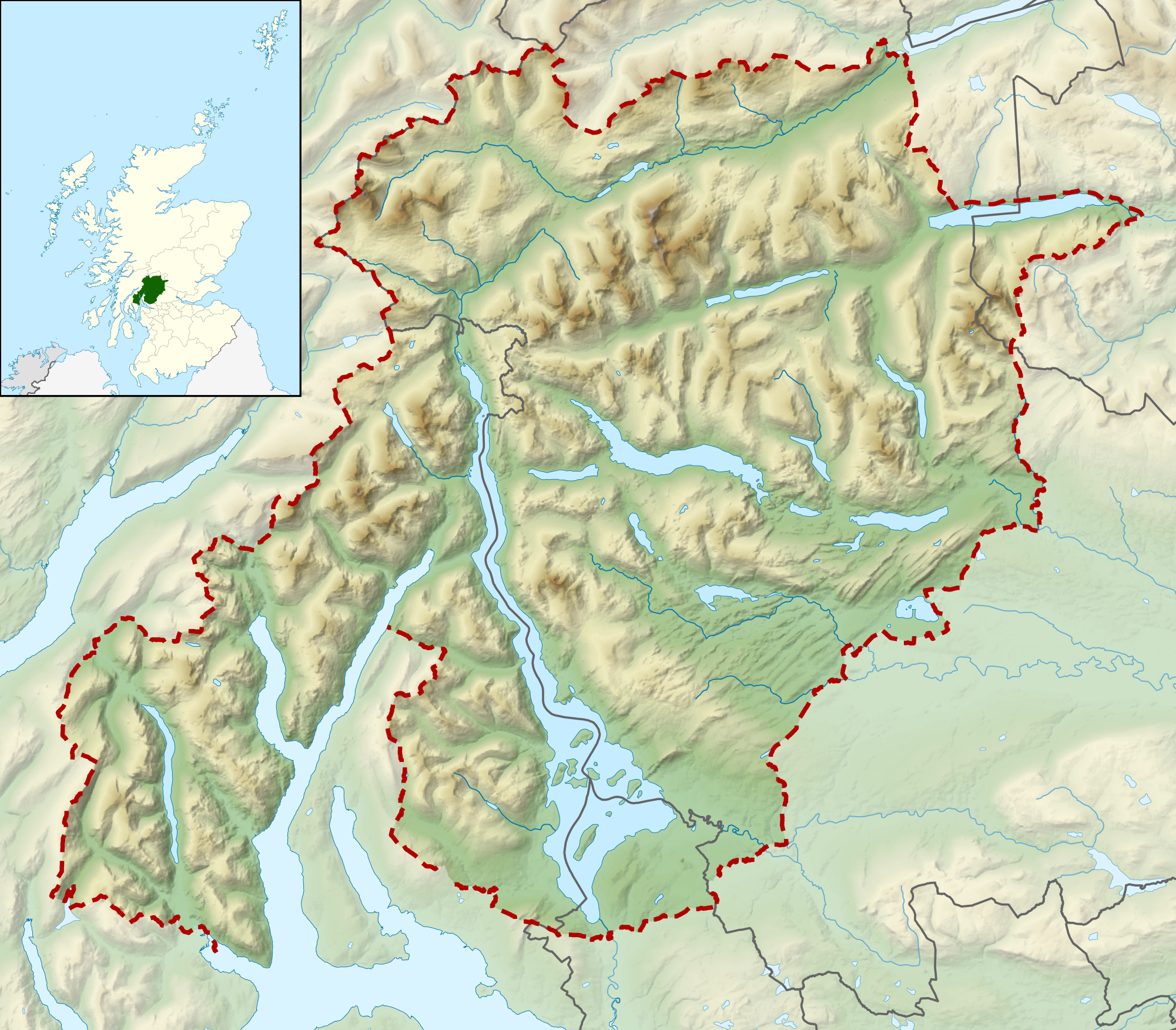
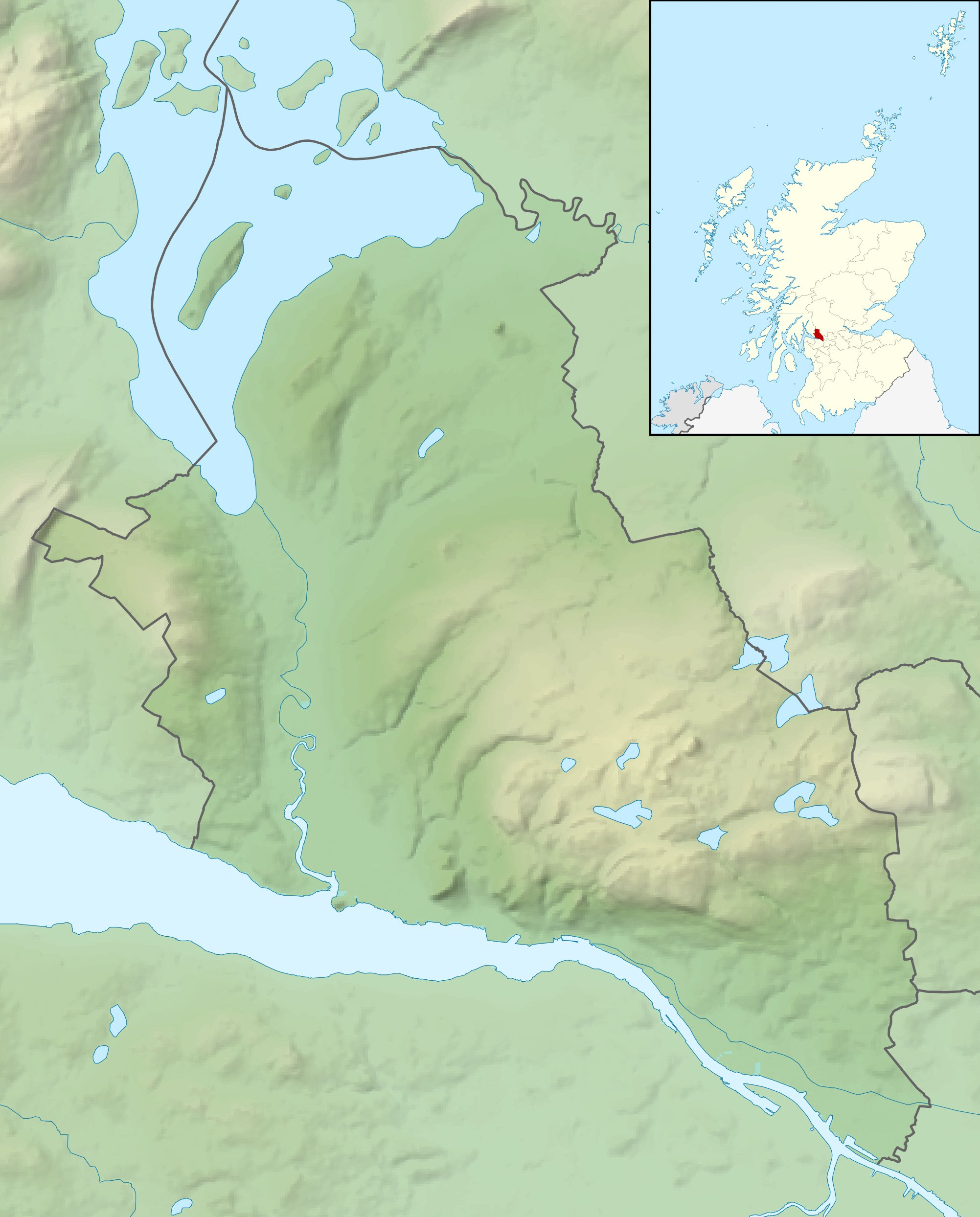
- Location in Scotland Location within the Loch Lomond and The Trossachs National Park Location partly in West Dunbartonshire
- Location: West Dunbartonshire/Argyll and Bute/Stirling, Scotland
- Coordinates: 56°04′N 4°35′W
- Type: freshwater loch, ribbon lake, dimictic
- Primary inflows: Endrick Water, Fruin Water, River Falloch
- Primary outflows: River Leven
- Catchment area: 781 km^{2} (302 sq mi)
- Basin countries: Scotland
- Max. length: 36.4 km (22.6 mi)
- Max. width: 8 km (5.0 mi)
- Surface area: 71 km^{2} (27.5 mi^{2})
- Max. depth: 190 m (620 ft)
- Water volume: 2.6 km^{3} (0.62 cu mi)
- Residence time: 1.9 years
- Surface elevation: 7.9 m (26 ft)
- Frozen: Last partial freezing: 2010
- Islands: 60 (Inchcailloch, Inchmurrin, Inchfad)
- Sections/sub-basins: north basin, south basin
- Settlements: Balloch, Ardlui, Balmaha, Luss, Rowardennan, Tarbet

Ramsar Wetland
- Designated: 5 January 1976
- Reference no.: 73

Shown within Loch Lomond and The Trossachs National Park

Loch Lomond (/ˈlɒx ˈloʊmənd/; Scottish Gaelic: Loch Laomainn) is a freshwater Scottish loch that spans the Highland Boundary Fault, often considered the boundary between the Lowlands and Highlands of Scotland. Traditionally forming part of the boundary between the counties of Stirlingshire and Dunbartonshire, it is today split between the council areas of Stirling, Argyll and Bute and West Dunbartonshire. Its southern shores are about 23 kilometres (14 mi) northwest of the centre of Glasgow, Scotland's largest city. The loch forms part of Loch Lomond and The Trossachs National Park, which was established in 2002. From a limnological perspective, Loch Lomond is classified as a dimictic lake, typically undergoing two mixing periods each year. This occurs in the spring and autumn when the water column becomes uniformly mixed due to temperature-driven density changes.

Loch Lomond is 36.4 kilometres (22.6 mi) long and between one and eight kilometres (1/2–5 miles) wide, with a surface area of 71 km^{2} (27.5 mi^{2}). It is the largest lake in Great Britain by surface area; in the United Kingdom, it is surpassed only by Lough Neagh and Lough Erne in Northern Ireland. The loch has a maximum depth of about 190 metres (620 ft) in the deeper northern portion, although the southern part of the loch rarely exceeds 30 metres (98 ft) in depth. The total volume of Loch Lomond is 2.6 km^{3} (0.62 cu mi), making it the second largest lake in Great Britain, after Loch Ness, by water volume. Due to its considerable depth and latitudinal location, Loch Lomond exhibits thermal stratification during the summer months, with a distinct epilimnion, metalimnion, and hypolimnion forming in deeper areas. These stratification patterns have important implications for nutrient cycling and aquatic ecology within the loch. During periods of stratification, a decrease in hypolimnetic oxygen can occur in the deeper northern basin, which can affect the species distribution patterns.

Loch Lomond is considered oligotrophic (north of the Highland Boundary Fault) to mesotrophic (south of the fault), with relatively low to moderate nutrient levels and generally good water quality, although localised pressures such as agriculture and tourism can contribute to nutrient enrichment.

The loch contains many islands, including Inchmurrin, the largest fresh-water island in the British Isles. Loch Lomond is a popular leisure destination and is featured in the song "The Bonnie Banks o' Loch Lomond". The loch is surrounded by hills, including Ben Lomond on the eastern shore, which is 973.7 metres (3,195 ft) in height and the most southerly of the Scottish Munro peaks. A 2005 poll of Radio Times readers voted Loch Lomond as the sixth greatest natural wonder in Britain.

== Etymology ==
Loch Lomond takes its modern name from the highest peak in the area, Ben Lomond (Scottish Gaelic: Beinn Laomainn), whose name means "beacon mountain". An older name for the loch was Loch Leamhna, Leamhna being the genitive form of Leamhain, the Gaelic name for the River Leven (meaning "elm water").

== History ==
=== Origins and habitation ===
People first arrived in the Loch Lomond area around 5000 years ago, during the Neolithic era. They left traces of their presence at places around the loch, including Balmaha, Luss, and Inchlonaig. Crannogs, artificial islands used as dwellings for over five millennia, were built at points in the loch. The Romans built a double-row of defense forts within sight of the loch at Drumquhassle in the first century, and was built to protect themselves against the Highland tribes during their invasion of Scotland. Known as a "glen-blocker" fort, it dates back to the Flavian dynasty (69 – 96 AD). The crannog known as "The Kitchen", located off the island of Clairinsh, may have later been used as a place for important meetings by Clan Buchanan whose clan seat had been on Clairinsh since 1225: this usage would be in line with other crannogs such as that at Finlaggan on Islay, used by Clan Donald.

During the Early Medieval period viking raiders sailed up Loch Long, hauled their longboats over at the narrow neck of land at Tarbet, and sacked several islands in the loch. The area surrounding the loch later become part of the province of Lennox, which covered much of the area of the later county of Dunbartonshire.

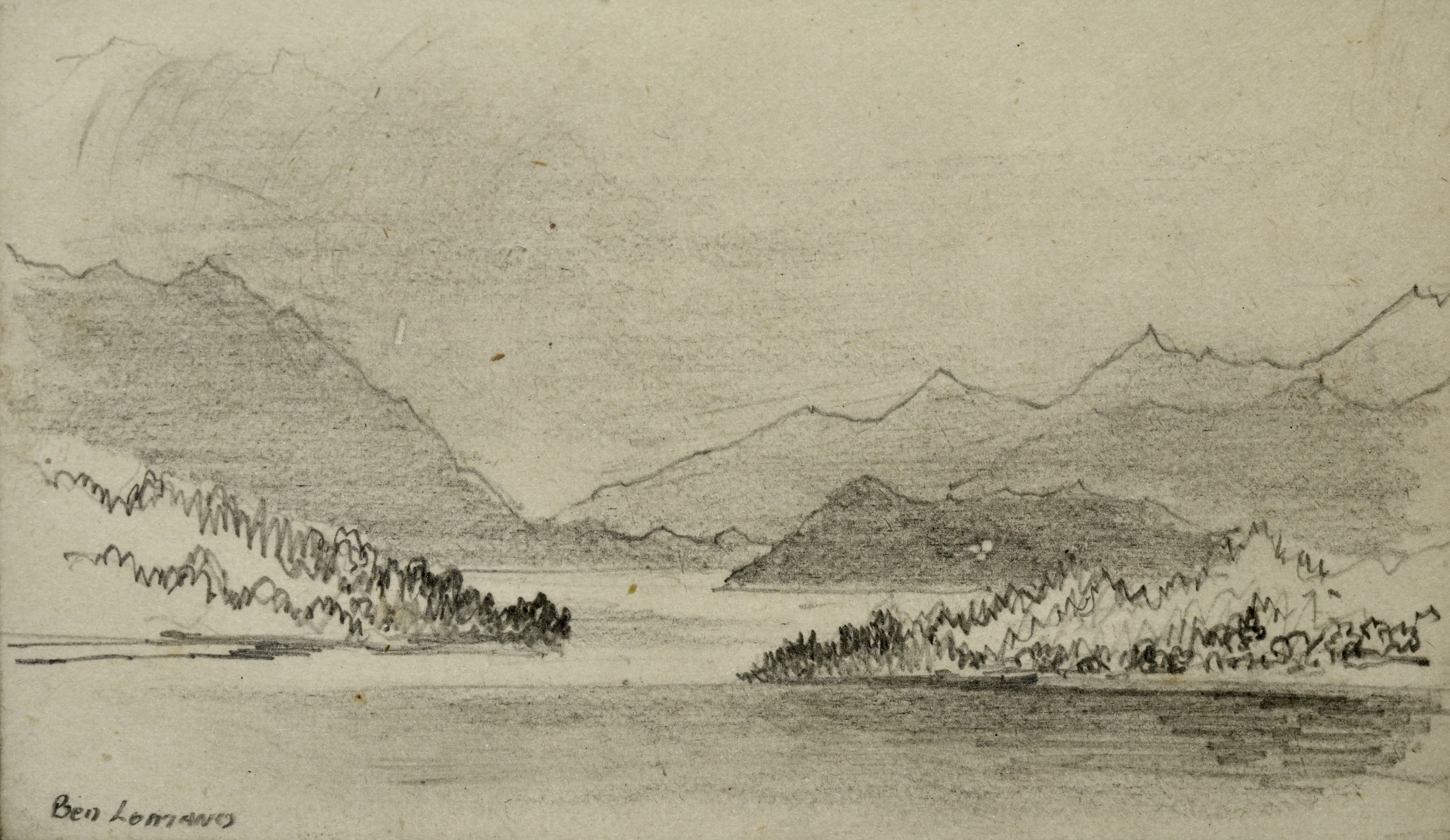
Loch Lomond depicted in a late 19th-century graphite drawing by Thomas J. Marple.

Loch Lomond became a popular destination for travellers, such that when James Boswell and Samuel Johnson visited the islands of Loch Lomond on the return from their tour of the Western Isles in 1773, the area was already firmly enough established as a destination for Boswell to note that it would be unnecessary to attempt any description.

=== Formation ===
The depression in which Loch Lomond lies was carved out by glaciers during the retreat of the last ice age, during a temporary return to glacial conditions known as the Younger Dryas. Locally this is known as the Loch Lomond Readvance, between 20,000 and 10,000 years ago. The hydrology and structure of the loch are strongly influenced by its glacial origins and underlying geology. Formed during the last glaciation, the loch occupies a classic glacial trough, carved by ice movement from the Ben Lui region. The loch lies on the Highland Boundary Fault, and the difference between the Highland and Lowland geology is reflected in the shape and character of the loch: in the north the glaciers dug a deep channel in the Highland schist, removing up to 600 m of bedrock to create a narrow, fjord-like finger lake.This area is underlain by ancient Precambrian and Cambrian schists and quartzites, which contributed to the formation of the deep and narrow northern basin, reaching depths of up to 190 metres. Further south the glaciers were able to spread across the softer Lowland sandstone, leading to a wider body of water that is rarely more than 30 m deep. The southern part of the loch features younger Devonian sandstones and volcanic rocks, especially near the Campsie Fells, resulting in a broad, shallow basin. In the period following the Loch Lomond Readvance the sea level rose, and for several periods Loch Lomond was connected to the sea, with shorelines identified at 13, 12 and 9 metres above sea level (the current loch lies at 8 m above sea level).

The change in rock type can be clearly seen at points around the loch, as it runs across the islands of Inchmurrin, Creinch, Torrinch and Inchcailloch and over the ridge of Conic Hill. The loch's shape and many of its islands follow the line of the Highland Boundary Fault, separating the ancient metamorphic rocks of the Highlands from the younger sedimentary rocks of the Lowlands. To the south lie green fields and cultivated land; to the north, mountains.

== Catchment ==
Loch Lomond has a catchment area of approximately 781 square kilometres. The primary inflows include the River Falloch in the north, the Endrick Water in the southeast, and the Fruin Water, along with numerous smaller streams. The loch drains southward via its sole outflow, the River Leven, which eventually joins the River Clyde at Dumbarton. With a relatively short water residence time of approximately 1.9 years, Loch Lomond is a dynamic freshwater system shaped by both climatic and geological forces.

Rainfall varies significantly across the catchment, with the mountainous western Highlands receiving over 3,000 mm annually, while the southern lowlands average around 1,500 mm. This variation contributes to differences in river discharge and water chemistry throughout the loch. The loch's water quality is generally high, with low nutrient levels and good ecological status, although areas such as Luss Bay can experience temporary declines following heavy rainfall due to diffuse pollution from surrounding agriculture and forestry.

The contrasting sub-catchments of the River Falloch and River Endrick have a notable impact on water chemistry within the loch. The River Falloch drains a mountainous, base-poor catchment north of the Highland Boundary Fault, characterised by steep slopes, high rainfall (averaging 2,842 mm per year), and acidic, nutrient-poor soils. This results in oligotrophic inflows with low nutrient and organic content, supporting lower productivity in the northern basin. In contrast, the River Endrick originates in a more fertile, base-rich catchment south of the fault. It flows through improved grasslands and farmland, contributing higher nutrient loads and organic matter. This mesotrophic inflow raises productivity and nutrient concentrations in the southern basin, which also receives lower rainfall (around 1,500 mm per year).

Vegetation within the catchment is varied and reflects the topographic and geological diversity. In the north, upland moorlands and remnants of Caledonian pine forest dominate, while the south supports more managed landscapes, including agricultural land, riparian woodlands, and patches of deciduous forest. Native species such as Scots pine, birch, and oak are common, and the area supports a mosaic of heathland and bog habitats. Many areas are designated as conservation sites, including Special Areas of Conservation and Sites of Special Scientific Interest, recognising their biodiversity and ecological importance.

Loch Lomond is also geologically unique due to its glacial landforms and subsurface features. The loch's basin contains sedimentary layers that have accumulated since the last ice age, including the recently identified Inchmurrin Formation, formed by landslides after deglaciation. In some areas, sediment deposits reach depths of up to 127 metres. Between the major geological zones lies the Highland Border Complex, a narrow band of mixed metamorphic and sedimentary rocks representing an ancient ocean basin.

Human pressures such as diffuse agricultural pollution, bank modifications, and the spread of invasive species pose ongoing challenges. Restoration efforts focus on improving water quality and restoring degraded peatlands to enhance natural water retention and carbon storage. Luss Bay and other parts of the loch are designated bathing waters monitored by the Scottish Environment Protection Agency, although swimming is not recommended after heavy rainfall due to runoff contamination.

Overall, Loch Lomond's hydrology is shaped by a complex interplay of glacial history, geological contrasts, climatic variation, and human influence. These factors create a highly diverse and dynamic catchment that supports a wide range of ecological, recreational, and conservation functions.

== Islands ==
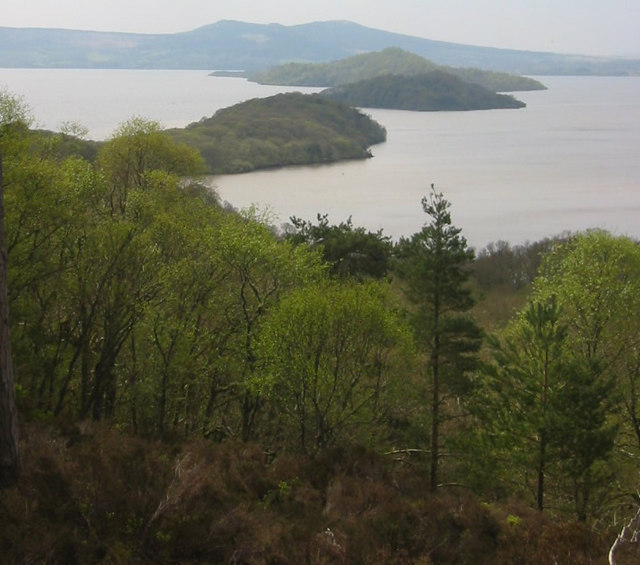
From the summit of the island of Inchcailloch to Torrinch, Creinch, Inchmurrin and Ben Bowie

The loch contains thirty or more other islands, (Note: Some of the islets in Loch Lomond may only appear when the water levels are low and although many sources provide a figure of up to sixty islands this may derive from a poetic 9th century description. Other sources suggest a total of 30 or 38 islands.) depending on the water level. Several of them are large by the standards of British bodies of freshwater. Inchmurrin, for example, is the largest island in a body of freshwater in the British Isles. Many of the islands are the remains of harder rocks that withstood the passing of the glaciers; however, as in Loch Tay, several of the islands appear to be crannogs, artificial islands built in prehistoric periods.

English travel writer H. V. Morton wrote:

What a large part of Loch Lomond's beauty is due to its islands, those beautiful green tangled islands, that lie like jewels upon its surface.

Writing 150 years earlier than Morton, Samuel Johnson had however been less impressed by Loch Lomond's islands, writing:

But as it is, the islets, which court the gazer at a distance, disgust him at his approach, when he finds, instead of soft lawns and shady thickets, nothing more than uncultivated ruggedness.

— Johnson

== Flora and fauna ==
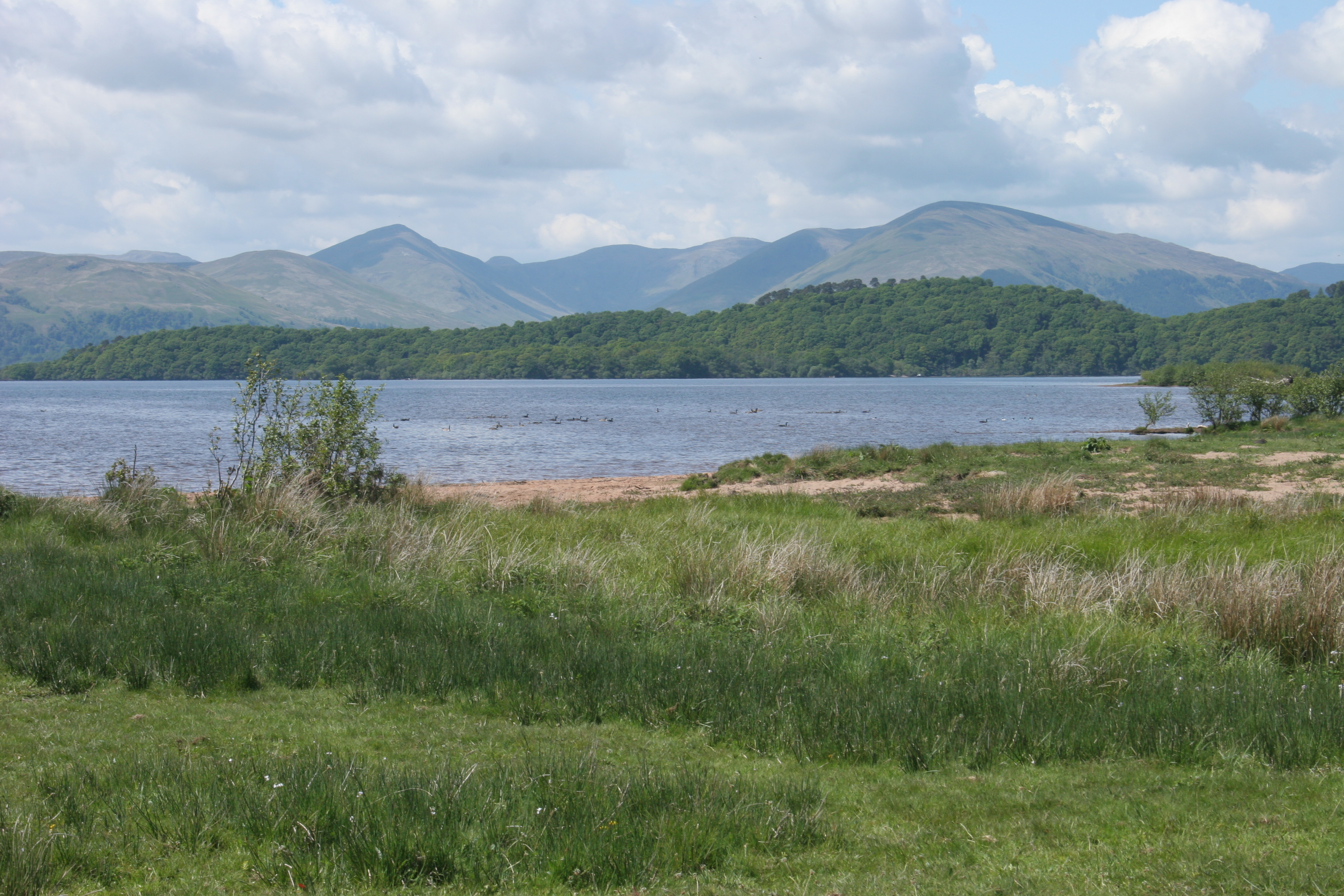
Birds flying around Loch Lomond

The Scottish dock (Rumex aquaticus), sometimes called the Loch Lomond dock, is in Britain unique to the shores of Loch Lomond, being found mostly on around Balmaha on the eastern shore of the loch. It was first discovered growing there in 1936 (else it grows eastwards through Europe and Asia all the way to Japan).

Powan are one of the commonest fish species in the loch, which has more species of fish than any other loch in Scotland, including lamprey, lampern, brook trout, perch, loach, common roach and flounder. The river lamprey of Loch Lomond display an unusual behavioural trait not seen elsewhere in Britain: unlike other populations, in which young hatch in rivers before migrating to the sea, the river lamprey here remain in freshwater all their lives, hatching in the Endrick Water and migrating into the loch as adults.

The surrounding hills are home to species such as black grouse, ptarmigan, golden eagles, pine martens, red deer and mountain hares. Many species of wading birds and water vole inhabit the loch shore. During the winter months large numbers of geese migrate to Loch Lomond, including over 1% of the entire global population of Greenland white-fronted geese (around 200 individuals), and up to 3,000 greylag geese.

In January 2023 RSPB Scotland released a family of beavers into the southeastern area of the loch under licence from NatureScot. The beaver family, consisting of an adult pair and their five offspring, were translocated from a site in Tayside, where beaver activity was having a negative impact that could not be mitigated.

One of the loch's islands, Inchconnachan, is home to a colony of red-necked wallabies.

Invasive species pose a significant threat to the biodiversity and ecological balance of Loch Lomond and its surrounding habitats. Several invasive non-native species have established themselves in the area, particularly along riverbanks and loch shores, where they outcompete native plants and disrupt local ecosystems. The most problematic invasive plant species in the Loch Lomond catchment include Giant Hogweed (Heracleum mantegazzianum), Japanese Knotweed (Fallopia japonica), Himalayan Balsam (Impatiens glandulifera), and American Skunk Cabbage (Lysichiton americanus). These species are targeted for control by local conservation organisations, as their rapid spread and dense growth can threaten native flora and fauna, destabilise riverbanks, and reduce habitat quality for wildlife. Efforts to manage and eradicate these invasives are ongoing, with volunteers and park authorities working to monitor, map, and treat affected areas to protect the loch's unique biodiversity.

=== Conservation designations ===
As well as forming part of the Loch Lomond and the Trossachs National Park, Loch Lomond holds multiple other conservation designations. 428 ha of land in the southeast, including five of the islands, is designated as national nature reserve: the Loch Lomond National Nature Reserve. Seven islands and much of the shoreline form a Special Area of Conservation (SAC), the Loch Lomond Woods. This designation overlaps partially with the national nature reserve, and is protected due to the presence of Atlantic oak woodlands and a population of otters. Four islands and a section of the shoreline are designated as a Special Protection Area due to their importance for breeding capercaillie and visiting Greenland white-fronted geese: this designation overlaps partially with both the national nature reserve and the SAC. Loch Lomond is also a designated Ramsar site, again for the presence of Greenland white-fronted geese.

Peatlands are a significant feature within the catchment, particularly on upland estates, where they have historically been used for rough grazing and game management. However, these peatlands are now recognised for their vital role in carbon storage, water management, and biodiversity, leading to increased efforts in restoration and sustainable management. Integrated land management approaches within Loch Lomond and The Trossachs National Park encourage collaboration between farmers, estate managers, and conservation bodies to restore degraded peatlands while maintaining productive agricultural systems, thereby supporting both climate resilience and rural livelihoods.

The loch and its surrounding are designated as a national scenic area, one of forty such areas in Scotland, which have been defined so as to identify areas of exceptional scenery and to ensure its protection from inappropriate development.

== Leisure activities ==
=== Boating and watersports ===
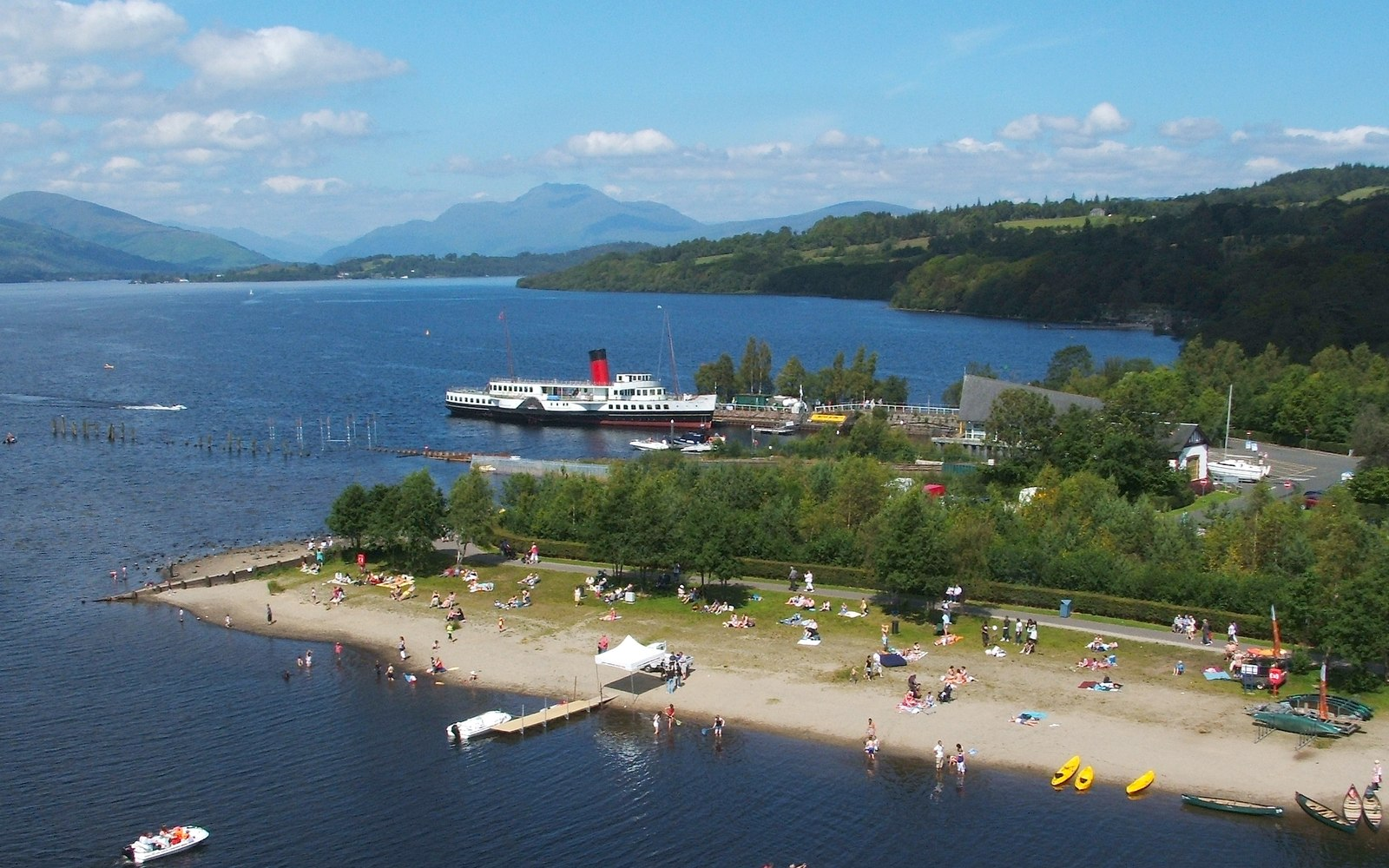
Maid of the Loch at Balloch pier, with various other leisure activities taking place

Loch Lomond is one of Scotland's premier boating and watersports venues, with visitors enjoying activities including kayaking, Canadian canoeing, paddle boarding, wake boarding, water skiing and wake surfing. The national park authority has tried to achieve a balance between land-based tourists and loch users, with environmentally sensitive areas subject to a strictly enforced 11 km/h (5.9 kn; 6.8 mph) speed limit, but the rest of the loch open to speeds of up to 90 km/h (49 kn; 56 mph).

The Maid of the Loch was the last paddle steamer built in Britain. Built on the Clyde in 1953, she operated on Loch Lomond for 29 years. She is now being restored at Balloch pier by the Loch Lomond Steamship Company, a charitable organisation, supported by West Dunbartonshire Council. Cruises also operate from Balloch, Tarbet, Inversnaid, Luss and Rowardennan.

Loch Lomond Rescue Boat provides 24-hour safety cover on the loch. The rescue boat is a volunteer organisation and a registered charity. The national park authority also have other boats on the loch such as The Brigadier. Police Scotland also operates on the loch using RIBs and jet skis and work in conjunction with the national park authority.

Loch Lomond, spanning the Highland Boundary Fault. Pictured are two locals doing a traditional winter dive.

The loch has served as the venue for the Great Scottish Swim, which is held each year in August.

=== Angling ===
Fly and coarse fishing on Loch Lomond is regulated by the Loch Lomond Angling Improvement Association, who issue permits to members and visiting anglers. The association employ water bailiffs to monitor the actions of anglers on the loch and ensure angling is carried out in accordance with permit conditions.

=== Land-based activities ===
Loch Lomond Golf Club is situated on the south-western shore. It has hosted many international events including the Scottish Open. Another golf club, "The Carrick" has opened on the banks of the Loch adjacent to the Loch Lomond Club.

The West Highland Way runs along the eastern bank of the loch, and Inveruglas on the western bank is the terminus of the Loch Lomond and Cowal Way. The West Loch Lomond Cycle Path runs from Arrochar and Tarbet railway station, at the upper end of the loch, to Balloch railway station, at the south end. The 17-mile-long (28 km) long cycle path runs along the west bank.

At the southern end of the loch near Balloch is a large visitor and shopping complex named Loch Lomond Shores.

=== Access and camping ===
As with all land and inland water in Scotland there is a right of responsible access to the loch and its shoreline for those wishing to participate in recreational pursuits such as walking, camping, swimming and canoeing. In 2017 the national park authority introduced byelaws restricting the right to camp along much of the shoreline of Loch Lomond, due to issues such as litter and anti-social behaviour that were blamed on irresponsible campers. Camping is now restricted to designated areas, and campers are required to purchase a permit to camp within these areas between March and October. The byelaws were opposed by groups such as Mountaineering Scotland and Ramblers Scotland, who argued that they would criminalise camping even where it was carried out responsibly, and that the national park authority already had sufficient powers to address irresponsible behaviour using existing laws.

== Transport ==
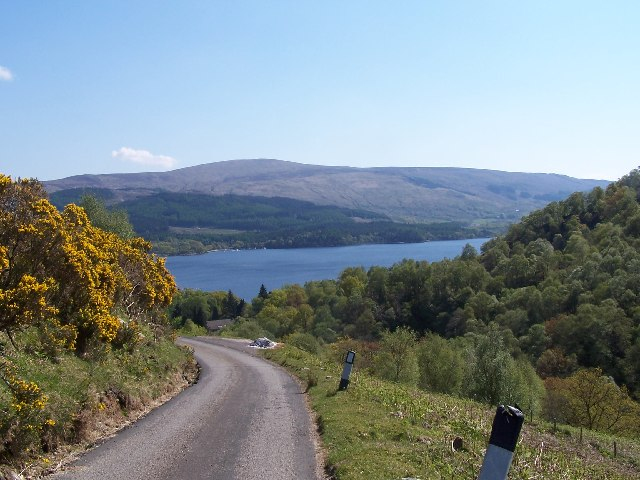
B–road approach Loch Lomond, with Glen Douglas in the background

The main arterial route along the loch is the A82 road which runs the length of its western shore, following the general route of the Old Military Road. The road runs along the shoreline in places, but generally keeps some distance to the west of the loch in the "lowland" section to the south. Much of the southern section of the road was widened to a high quality single carriageway standard over the 1980s, at an estimated cost of £24 million (£82 million as of 2025), while Luss itself is now bypassed to the west of the village along a single carriageway bypass constructed between 1990 and 1992. At Tarbet, the A83 branches west to Campbeltown while the A82 continues to the north end of the loch. This part of the road is currently of a lower standard than the sections further south. It is sandwiched between the shoreline of the loch and the mountains to the west, and it runs generally alongside the West Highland Line. The road narrows to less than 7.3 metres (24 ft) in places and causes significant problems for heavy goods vehicles, which have to negotiate tight bends and the narrow carriageway width. At Pulpit rock, the road was single-track, with traffic flow controlled by traffic lights for over 30 years. The road was widened in 2015 as part of a £9 million improvement programme, including a new viaduct bringing the carriageway width to modern standards.

The A811 runs to the south of Loch Lomond between Balloch and Drymen, following the route of another military road at a distance of between 2 and 3 kilometres from the loch. From Drymen the B837 extends north, meeting the eastern shore of the loch at Balmaha where the road terminates. A minor road extends north as far as Rowardennan, a further 11 km away, however beyond this point no road continues along the eastern shore, although there is road access to Inversnaid via another minor road that comes in from Loch Katrine to the east via the northern shore of Loch Arklet. As Loch Arklet is over 100 m above Loch Lomond and less than 2 km to the east this road must descend steeply to reach Inversnaid.

The West Highland railway line joins the western shore of the loch just north of Arrochar and Tarbet railway station. There is a further station alongside the loch at Ardlui. This line was voted the top rail journey in the world by readers of independent travel magazine Wanderlust in 2009, ahead of the iconic Trans-Siberian line in Russia and the Cuzco to Machu Picchu line in Peru. The railway system also reaches the loch at Balloch railway station, which is the terminus of the North Clyde Line.

Several different operators offer ferry and waterbus services on the loch. From 2004 to 2025 Loch Lomond Seaplanes operated seaplane services from a base near Cameron. On 22 April 1940, a BOAC Lockheed Model 14 Super Electra (Loch Invar, registration G-AFKD) aircraft flying from Perth Airport to Heston Aerodrome in London crashed at Loch Lomond, killing all five passengers and crew.

== Hydroelectricity ==
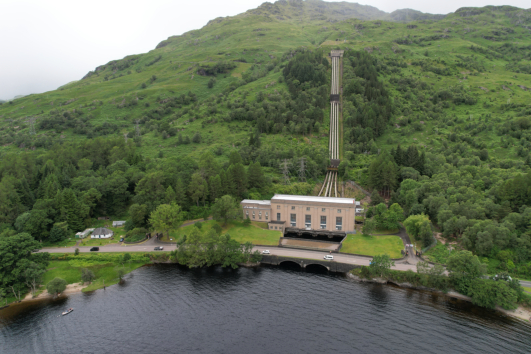
The power station at Inveruglas on the west bank of Loch Lomond.

The Loch Sloy Hydro-Electric Scheme is situated on the west bank of Loch Lomond. The facility is operated by Scottish and Southern Energy, and is normally in standby mode, ready to generate electricity to meet sudden peaks in demand. It is the largest conventional hydro electric power station in the UK, with an installed capacity of 152.5 MW, and can reach full-capacity within 5 minutes from a standing start. The hydraulic head between Loch Sloy and the outflow into Loch Lomond at Inveruglas is 277 m. Loch Lomond's limnological characteristics, including its classification as a dimictic lake, can influence thermal stratification and oxygen distribution, which may interact with hydroelectric operations through alterations in inflow and outflow patterns. Additionally, the deep inflow of cold, oxygen-rich water from the Sloy system can affect hypolimnetic conditions, potentially enhancing oxygenation at depth and modifying nutrient cycling within the loch.

== In popular culture ==
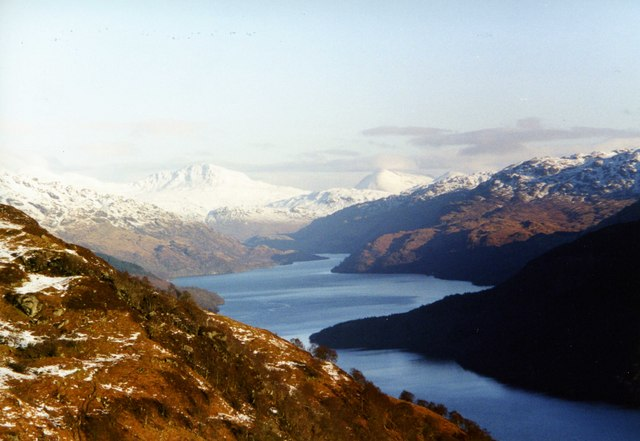
Loch Lomond from just below Beinn Dubh and Creag an t-Seilich

=== Song ===
The loch is featured in a well-known song which was first published around 1841. The chorus is:

Oh, ye'll tak the high road, and I'll tak the low road,
And I'll be in Scotland afore ye;
But me and my true love will never meet again
On the bonnie, bonnie banks o' Loch Lomond.

The song has been recorded by many performers over the years. The original author is unknown. One story is that the song was written by a Scottish soldier who awaited death in enemy captivity; in his final letter home, he wrote this song, portraying his home and how much he would miss it. Another tale is that during the Jacobite rising of 1745 a soldier on his way back to Scotland during the 1745–46 retreat from England wrote this song. The "low road" may be a reference to the Celtic belief that if someone died away from his homeland, then the fairies would provide a route of this name for his soul to return home. Within this theory, it is possible that the soldier awaiting death may have been writing either to a friend who was allowed to live and return home, or to a lover back in Scotland.

=== Other ===
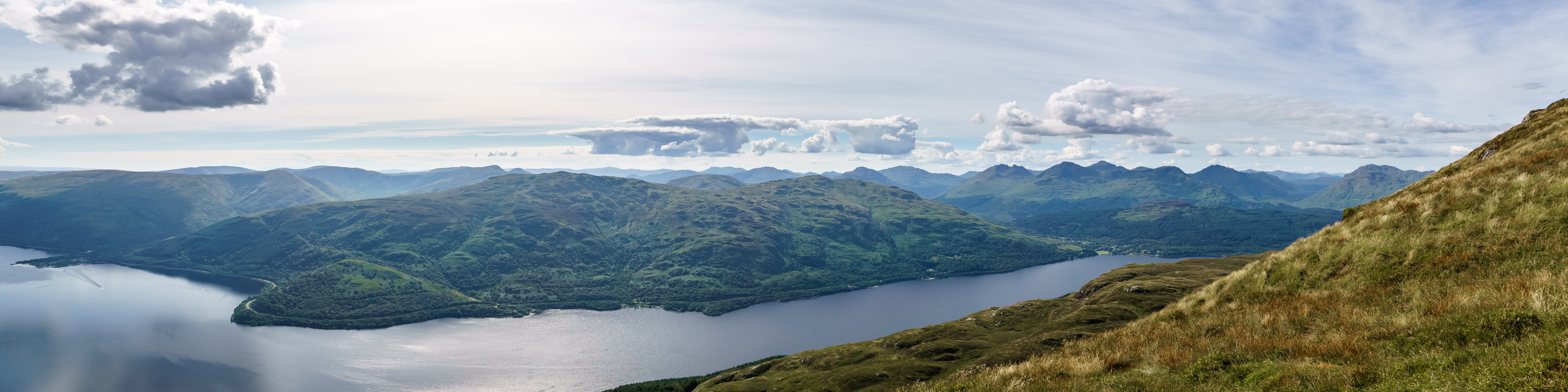
Loch Lomond, looking west from Ben Lomond

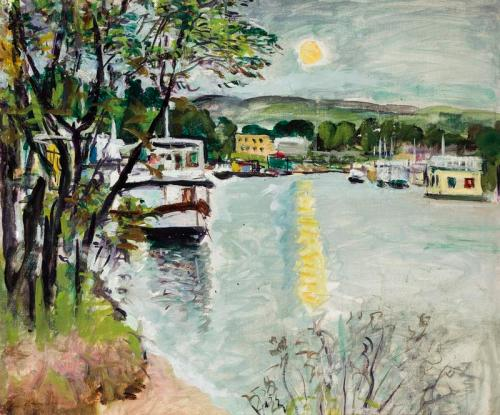
Moonlight, Loch Lomond by George Leslie Hunter, c.1924

- Loch Lomond (like Loch Ness) is often used as a shorthand for all things Scottish, an image partly reinforced by the self-titled song. An archetype is the Lerner and Loewe musical Brigadoon. The opening lyrics of the song "Almost Like Being in Love" are: "Maybe the sun gave me the power/For I could swim Loch Lomond and be home in half an hour/Maybe the air gave me the drive/For I'm all aglow and alive!"
- It is mentioned in the song "You're All the World to Me" from the musical film Royal Wedding in the line: "You're Loch Lomond when autumn is the painter!"
- The village of Luss ("Glendarroch") on the shores of the loch was the location for the TV soap Take the High Road, and the loch itself was given the fictional name Loch Darroch for the purpose of the series.
- Luss ("Lios") and the islands nearby were used as the setting for E. J. Oxenham's first book, Goblin Island, published in 1907.
- Loch Lomond is also the brand name of the Scotch whisky drunk by Captain Haddock in Hergé's comic book series The Adventures of Tintin, featured prominently in The Black Island. A non-fictional whisky by the same name is produced at the Loch Lomond distillery.
- "Loch Lomond" is the opening track on guitarist Steve Hackett's 2011 album Beyond the Shrouded Horizon.
- In The Three Stooges episode "Pardon My Scotch" a gentleman asks 'Are you laddies by any chance from Loch Lomond?', whereupon Curly replies 'No we're from lock jaw'.
- One of the road signs in the Merrie Melodies short My Bunny Lies over the Sea points to Loch Lomond.
- Spike Milligan created an episode of The Goon Show entitled The Treasure of Loch Lomond. The main character, Neddie Seagoon, discovers he has Scottish heritage and travels to Scotland to claim a fortune owned by his uncle, who discovered a galleon full of treasure at the bottom of the loch.
- In the Mel Brooks film Spaceballs, the character "Snotty" delivers the line "Lock one... lock two... lock three... Loch Lomond..." while locking transporters onto "President Skroob".
- In Santa Cruz County, California, United States, lies Loch Lomond, a small body of water named after Loch Lomond in Scotland. Near Loch Lomond, California, is Ben Lomond which was named by Scot John Burns in 1851.
- In Canada, there is a Loch Lomond by Thunder Bay, Ontario; a Loch Lomond in Richmond County, Nova Scotia; as well as a Hamlet named for the loch in southern Alberta.
- Loch Lomond features as the backdrop for a song sequence in the 1998 Bollywood film Kuch Kuch Hota Hai.

== See also ==
- Inverarnan Canal – a short waterway that once allowed Loch Lomond steamers to reach Inverarnan
- List of freshwater islands in Scotland
- List of lochs in Scotland
