= List of United Kingdom locations: Ef-El =

The United Kingdom

This is part of the list of United Kingdom locations: a gazetteer of place names in the United Kingdom showing each place's locality and geographical coordinates.

== Ef ==
Location	Locality	Coordinates (links to map & photo sources)	OS grid reference
Efail-fach	Neath Port Talbot	51.64°N 03.76°W	SS7895
Efail Isaf	Rhondda, Cynon, Taff	51.54°N 03.32°W	ST0884
Efailnewydd	Gwynedd	52.88°N 04.45°W	SH3535
Efailwen	Carmarthenshire	51.89°N 04.71°W	SN1325
Efenechtyd	Denbighshire	53.08°N 03.33°W	SJ1155
Effingham	Surrey	51.26°N 00.41°W	TQ1153
Effirth	Shetland Islands	60.25°N 01.44°W	HU3152
Effledge	Scottish Borders	55.42°N 02.71°W	NT5515
Efflinch	Staffordshire	52.75°N 01.71°W	SK1917
Efford	Devon	50.38°N 04.11°W	SX5056

== Eg ==
Location	Locality	Coordinates (links to map & photo sources)	OS grid reference
Egbury	Hampshire	51.26°N 01.38°W	SU4352
Egdon	Worcestershire	52.15°N 02.13°W	SO9151
Egerton	Kent	51.19°N 00.71°E	TQ9047
Egerton	Bolton	53.62°N 02.43°W	SD7114
Egerton Forstal	Kent	51.18°N 00.70°E	TQ8946
Egerton Green	Cheshire	53.06°N 02.71°W	SJ5252
Egford	Somerset	51.23°N 02.35°W	ST7548
Eggbeare	Cornwall	50.66°N 04.36°W	SX3388
Eggborough	North Yorkshire	53.70°N 01.15°W	SE5623
Eggbuckland	Devon	50.39°N 04.11°W	SX5057
Eggesford Station	Devon	50.88°N 03.87°W	SS6811
Eggington	Bedfordshire	51.91°N 00.62°W	SP9525
Egginton	Derbyshire	52.84°N 01.61°W	SK2628
Egginton Common	Derbyshire	52.85°N 01.60°W	SK2729
Egglesburn	Durham	54.61°N 02.03°W	NY9824
Egglescliffe	Stockton-on-Tees	54.51°N 01.36°W	NZ4113
Eggleston	Durham	54.60°N 02.00°W	NZ0023
Egham	Surrey	51.42°N 00.56°W	TQ0071
Egham Hythe	Surrey	51.42°N 00.53°W	TQ0270
Egham Wick	Surrey	51.42°N 00.59°W	SU9870
Egilsay	Shetland Islands	60.40°N 01.43°W	HU314694
Egilsay	Orkney Islands	59.15°N 02.93°W	HY469298
Egleton	Rutland	52.65°N 00.71°W	SK8707
Eglingham	Northumberland	55.46°N 01.84°W	NU1019
Egloshayle	Cornwall	50.51°N 04.82°W	SX0072
Egloskerry	Cornwall	50.64°N 04.44°W	SX2786
Eglwysbach	Conwy	53.21°N 03.79°W	SH8070
Eglwys-Brewis	Vale of Glamorgan	51.41°N 03.43°W	ST0069
Eglwys Cross	Wrexham	52.95°N 02.79°W	SJ4740
Eglwys Fach	Ceredigion	52.53°N 03.94°W	SN6895
Eglwyswen	Pembrokeshire	51.99°N 04.69°W	SN1536
Eglwyswrw	Pembrokeshire	52.00°N 04.71°W	SN1438
Egmanton	Nottinghamshire	53.20°N 00.90°W	SK7368
Egmere	Norfolk	52.89°N 00.82°E	TF9037
Egremont	Cumbria	54.47°N 03.52°W	NY0110
Egremont	Wirral	53.42°N 03.03°W	SJ3192
Egton	North Yorkshire	54.44°N 00.76°W	NZ8006
Egton Bridge	North Yorkshire	54.43°N 00.76°W	NZ8005
Egypt	Hampshire	51.15°N 01.34°W	SU4640
Egypt	Buckinghamshire	51.55°N 00.61°W	SU9685
Egypt	Berkshire	51.48°N 01.36°W	SU4476
Egypt	Bradford	53.79°N 01.86°W	SE0933

== Ei ==
Location	Locality	Coordinates (links to map & photo sources)	OS grid reference
Eigg	Highland	56.89°N 06.15°W	NM474861
Eight Ash Green	Essex	51.89°N 00.81°E	TL9425
Eighton Banks	Gateshead	54.91°N 01.58°W	NZ2758
Eign Hill	Herefordshire	52.04°N 02.70°W	SO5239
Eilanreach	Highland	57.19°N 05.64°W	NG8017
Eildon	Scottish Borders	55.58°N 02.68°W	NT5732
Eilean a' Chalmain	Argyll and Bute	56.29°N 06.37°W	NM297195
Eilean a' Chùirn	Argyll and Bute	55.66°N 06.02°W	NR471488
Eilean a' Ghobha	Western Isles	58.28°N 07.64°W	NA691463
Eilean an Eòin	Argyll and Bute	55.99°N 06.24°W	NR356857
Eileanan Iasgaich	Western Isles	57.14°N 07.30°W	NF792185
Eilean Annraidh	Argyll and Bute	56.34°N 06.37°W	NM297260
Eilean an Ròin Mòr	Highland	58.47°N 05.12°W	NC177587
Eilean an t-Snidhe	Highland	56.85°N 05.88°W	NM631809
Eilean a' Phidhir	Highland	56.95°N 05.76°W	NM711916
Eilean Balnagowan	Highland	56.63°N 05.33°W	NM953536
Eilean Bàn	Highland	56.96°N 05.78°W	NM702920
Eilean Beag	Highland	57.35°N 05.85°W	NG684356
Eilean Bhrìde	Argyll and Bute	55.86°N 05.91°W	NR552700
Eilean Buidhe	Western Isles	57.58°N 07.28°W	NF846673
Eilean Chalmain	Argyll and Bute	56.27°N 06.35°W	NM308173
Eilean Chaluim Chille	Western Isles	58.10°N 06.44°W	NB382213
Eilean Chathastail	Highland	56.87°N 06.12°W	NM490829
Eilean Creagach	Highland	57.59°N 06.53°W	NG292649
Eilean Dubh (Mull)	Argyll and Bute	56.28°N 06.38°W	NM286194
Eilean Dubh (Loch Craignish)	Argyll and Bute	56.15°N 05.55°W	NM794017
Eilean Dubh	Highland	57.97°N 05.42°W	NB973035
Eilean Dubh Beag	Argyll and Bute	56.23°N 05.72°W	NM695111
Eilean Dubh Mòr	Argyll and Bute	56.23°N 05.72°W	NM694104
Eilean Dùin	Argyll and Bute	56.32°N 05.58°W	NM783208
Eilean Duirinnis	Argyll and Bute	56.44°N 05.24°W	NN0033
Eilean Eachainn	Highland	57.68°N 05.46°W	NG936718
Eilean Fada Mòr	Highland	58.01°N 05.43°W	NB973076
Eilean Fladday	Highland	57.48°N 06.02°W	NG588512
Eilean Flodigarry	Highland	57.66°N 06.22°W	NG479714
Eilean Garave	Highland	57.58°N 06.51°W	NG300639
Eilean Ghaoideamal	Argyll and Bute	56.00°N 06.22°W	NR368871
Eilean Hoan	Highland	58.56°N 04.67°W	NC443675
Eilean Horrisdale	Highland	57.70°N 05.71°W	NG789743
Eilean Iarmain	Highland	57.14°N 05.82°W	NG6912
Eilean Ighe	Highland	56.91°N 05.88°W	NM636875
Eilean Imersay	Argyll and Bute	55.63°N 06.09°W	NR425459
Eilean Iosal (Loch Snizort)	Highland	57.59°N 06.54°W	NG287653
Eilean Iosal (Eilean nan Ròn, off Sutherland)	Highland	58.56°N 04.35°W	NC631661
Eilean Iubhard	Western Isles	58.00°N 06.44°W	NB378100
Eilean Kearstay	Western Isles	58.20°N 06.77°W	NB196334
Eilean Leathann	Western Isles	57.53°N 07.18°W	NF899616
Eilean Meadhonach	Highland	57.34°N 05.84°W	NG687346
Eilean Mhic an Fhularaich	Highland	57.68°N 05.45°W	NG941714
Eilean Mhic Chrion	Argyll and Bute	56.16°N 05.53°W	NM806029
Eilean Mhuire	Western Isles	57.90°N 06.33°W	NG430984
Eilean Mòr (Loch Baghasdail)	Western Isles	57.14°N 07.33°W	NF775184
Eilean Mòr (off Grimsay)	Western Isles	57.48°N 07.27°W	NF843562
Eilean Mòr (Loch Orasaigh)	Western Isles	58.16°N 06.45°W	NB384281
Eilean Mòr (off Kirkibost)	Western Isles	57.55°N 07.41°W	NF766649
Eilean Mòr (off Coll)	Argyll and Bute	56.69°N 06.44°W	NM281649
Eilean Mòr (Sound of Jura)	Argyll and Bute	55.91°N 05.73°W	NR667750
Eilean Mòr	Highland	58.10°N 05.30°W	NC055174
Eilean Mullagrach	Highland	58.04°N 05.46°W	NB958117
Eilean Musdile	Argyll and Bute	56.45°N 05.60°W	NM782348
Eilean nam Ban	Argyll and Bute	56.33°N 06.36°W	NM301244
Eilean nan Caorach	Argyll and Bute	56.56°N 05.41°W	NM900462
Eilean nan Coinein	Argyll and Bute	55.84°N 05.92°W	NR542683
Eilean nan Each	Highland	56.84°N 06.27°W	NM395812
Eilean nan Gabhar	Argyll and Bute	55.83°N 05.93°W	NR537675
Eilean nan Gamhna	Argyll and Bute	56.48°N 05.51°W	NM834376
Eilean nan Ròn	Argyll and Bute	55.99°N 06.27°W	NR335866
Eilean nan Ròn	Highland	58.55°N 04.34°W	NC637656
Eilean Ornsay	Argyll and Bute	56.60°N 06.52°W	NM225550
Eilean Rìgh	Argyll and Bute	56.15°N 05.53°W	NM803013
Eilean Ruairidh Mòr	Highland	57.70°N 05.52°W	NG901733
Eilean Shona	Highland	56.79°N 05.85°W	NM648737
Eilean Sùbhainn	Highland	57.69°N 05.48°W	NG927721
Eilean Thoraidh	Western Isles	58.09°N 06.38°W	NB420201
Eilean Taigh	Highland	57.50°N 06.00°W	NG603536
Eilean Taighe	Western Isles	58.28°N 07.58°W	NA728463
Eilean Trodday	Highland	57.72°N 06.29°W	NG442782
Eilt	Highland	56.87°N 05.62°W	NM790820
Eisgein	Western Isles	58.01°N 06.54°W	NB3212
Eisingrug	Gwynedd	52.88°N 04.06°W	SH6134

== El ==
=== Ela-Elm ===
Location	Locality	Coordinates (links to map & photo sources)	OS grid reference
Eland Green	Northumberland	55.05°N 01.75°W	NZ1673
Elan Village	Powys	52.27°N 03.56°W	SN9365
Elberton	South Gloucestershire	51.58°N 02.57°W	ST6088
Elborough	North Somerset	51.32°N 02.90°W	ST3759
Elbridge	West Sussex	50.81°N 00.70°W	SU9102
Elbridge	Shropshire	52.81°N 02.95°W	SJ3624
Elburton	Devon	50.34°N 04.06°W	SX5352
Elcock's Brook	Worcestershire	52.27°N 01.98°W	SP0164
Elcombe	Gloucestershire	51.67°N 02.31°W	ST7897
Elcombe	Swindon	51.51°N 01.81°W	SU1380
Elcot	Berkshire	51.41°N 01.44°W	SU3969
Eldene	Swindon	51.55°N 01.74°W	SU1884
Eldernell	Cambridgeshire	52.56°N 00.06°W	TL3198
Eldersfield	Worcestershire	51.97°N 02.29°W	SO8031
Elderslie	Renfrewshire	55.82°N 04.49°W	NS4462
Elder Street	Essex	51.98°N 00.28°E	TL5734
Eldon	Durham	54.63°N 01.64°W	NZ2327
Eldon Lane	Durham	54.63°N 01.66°W	NZ2227
Eldroth	North Yorkshire	54.08°N 02.36°W	SD7665
Eldwick	Bradford	53.85°N 01.81°W	SE1240
Elemore Vale	Durham	54.79°N 01.45°W	NZ3545
Elerch	Ceredigion	52.45°N 03.94°W	SN6886
Elford	Staffordshire	52.68°N 01.72°W	SK1910
Elford Closes	Cambridgeshire	52.32°N 00.19°E	TL5072
Elgin	Moray	57.64°N 03.32°W	NJ2162
Elgin Lane	Dumfries and Galloway	55.14°N 04.44°W	NX443859
Elgol	Highland	57.14°N 06.10°W	NG5213
Elham	Kent	51.14°N 01.10°E	TR1743
Eliburn	West Lothian	55.88°N 03.55°W	NT0367
Elim	Isle of Anglesey	53.32°N 04.47°W	SH3584
Eling	Hampshire	50.90°N 01.48°W	SU3612
Eling	Berkshire	51.47°N 01.25°W	SU5275
Elkesley	Nottinghamshire	53.26°N 00.98°W	SK6875
Elkington	Northamptonshire	52.37°N 01.09°W	SP6276
Elkins Green	Essex	51.68°N 00.31°E	TL6001
Elkstone	Gloucestershire	51.80°N 02.05°W	SO9612
Ellacombe	Devon	50.46°N 03.52°W	SX9264
Ellan	Highland	57.27°N 03.84°W	NH8922
Elland	Calderdale	53.68°N 01.83°W	SE1121
Elland Lower Edge	Calderdale	53.68°N 01.81°W	SE1221
Elland Upper Edge	Calderdale	53.67°N 01.81°W	SE1220
Ellary	Argyll and Bute	55.92°N 05.63°W	NR7376
Ellastone	Staffordshire	52.98°N 01.83°W	SK1143
Ellel	Lancashire	53.99°N 02.79°W	SD4856
Ellenabeich	Argyll and Bute	56.29°N 05.65°W	NM7417
Ellenborough	Cumbria	54.70°N 03.49°W	NY0435
Ellenbrook	Hertfordshire	51.75°N 00.26°W	TL2008
Ellenglaze	Cornwall	50.37°N 05.13°W	SW7757
Ellenhall	Staffordshire	52.83°N 02.23°W	SJ8426
Ellen's Green	Surrey	51.10°N 00.44°W	TQ0935
Ellerbeck	North Yorkshire	54.35°N 01.33°W	SE4396
Ellerburn	North Yorkshire	54.24°N 00.71°W	SE8484
Ellerby	North Yorkshire	54.51°N 00.78°W	NZ7914
Ellerdine	Shropshire	52.77°N 02.59°W	SJ6020
Ellerdine Heath	Shropshire	52.79°N 02.57°W	SJ6122
Ellerhayes	Devon	50.80°N 03.46°W	SS9702
Ellerker	East Riding of Yorkshire	53.74°N 00.60°W	SE9229
Ellerton	East Riding of Yorkshire	53.84°N 00.93°W	SE7039
Ellerton / Ellerton-on-Swale	North Yorkshire	54.36°N 01.61°W	SE2597
Ellerton	Shropshire	52.82°N 02.43°W	SJ7125
Ellesborough	Buckinghamshire	51.74°N 00.79°W	SP8306
Ellesmere	Shropshire	52.90°N 02.90°W	SJ3934
Ellesmere Park	Salford	53.48°N 02.34°W	SJ7799
Ellesmere Port	Cheshire	53.26°N 02.88°W	SJ4175
Ellicombe	Somerset	51.18°N 03.46°W	SS9844
Ellingham	Hampshire	50.87°N 01.80°W	SU1408
Ellingham	Norfolk	52.47°N 01.47°E	TM3692
Ellingham	Northumberland	55.51°N 01.73°W	NU1725
Ellingstring	North Yorkshire	54.24°N 01.74°W	SE1783
Ellington	Cambridgeshire	52.32°N 00.31°W	TL1571
Ellington	Northumberland	55.21°N 01.57°W	NZ2791
Ellington Thorpe	Cambridgeshire	52.31°N 00.31°W	TL1570
Elliot	Angus	56.54°N 02.63°W	NO6139
Elliots Green	Somerset	51.20°N 02.30°W	ST7945
Elliot's Town	Caerphilly	51.71°N 03.24°W	SO1402
Ellisfield	Hampshire	51.20°N 01.09°W	SU6346
Ellishadder	Highland	57.60°N 06.18°W	NG5065
Elliston	Scottish Borders	55.54°N 02.69°W	NT5628
Ellistown	Leicestershire	52.69°N 01.36°W	SK4311
Ellon	Aberdeenshire	57.36°N 02.08°W	NJ9530
Ellonby	Cumbria	54.70°N 02.90°W	NY4235
Ellough	Suffolk	52.41°N 01.58°E	TM4486
Elloughton	East Riding of Yorkshire	53.73°N 00.57°W	SE9427
Ellwood	Gloucestershire	51.76°N 02.59°W	SO5908
Elm	Cambridgeshire	52.63°N 00.17°E	TF4706
Elmbridge	Gloucestershire	51.86°N 02.21°W	SO8519
Elmbridge	Worcestershire	52.30°N 02.14°W	SO9067
Elm Corner	Surrey	51.30°N 00.46°W	TQ0757
Elmdon	Solihull	52.44°N 01.75°W	SP1783
Elmdon	Essex	52.03°N 00.12°E	TL4639
Elmdon Heath	Solihull	52.41°N 01.76°W	SP1680
Elmer	West Sussex	50.79°N 00.61°W	SU9800
Elmers End	Bromley	51.39°N 00.06°W	TQ3568
Elmers Green	Lancashire	53.54°N 02.77°W	SD4906
Elmers Marsh	West Sussex	51.04°N 00.77°W	SU8628
Elmfield	Isle of Wight	50.71°N 01.15°W	SZ6091
Elm Hill	Dorset	51.03°N 02.22°W	ST8426
Elmhurst	Buckinghamshire	51.82°N 00.81°W	SP8215
Elmhurst	Staffordshire	52.70°N 01.83°W	SK1112
Elmley Castle	Worcestershire	52.06°N 02.03°W	SO9841
Elmley Lovett	Worcestershire	52.31°N 02.19°W	SO8769
Elmore	Gloucestershire	51.83°N 02.32°W	SO7815
Elmore Back	Gloucestershire	51.84°N 02.33°W	SO7716
Elm Park	Havering	51.54°N 00.19°E	TQ5285
Elmscott	Devon	50.96°N 04.52°W	SS2321
Elmsett	Suffolk	52.07°N 00.99°E	TM0546
Elms Green	Herefordshire	52.20°N 02.73°W	SO5056
Elms Green	Worcestershire	52.29°N 02.41°W	SO7266
Elmslack	Lancashire	54.16°N 02.82°W	SD4675
Elmstead	Essex	51.89°N 00.99°E	TM0626
Elmstead Heath	Essex	51.85°N 00.99°E	TM0622
Elmstead Market	Essex	51.87°N 00.99°E	TM0624
Elmstead	Bromley	51.41°N 00.04°E	TQ4270
Elmsted	Kent	51.15°N 01.01°E	TR1144
Elmesthorpe	Leicestershire	52.56°N 01.32°W	SP4696
Elmstone	Kent	51.29°N 01.22°E	TR2560
Elmstone Hardwicke	Gloucestershire	51.93°N 02.11°W	SO9226
Elmswell	East Riding of Yorkshire	54.00°N 00.49°W	SE9958
Elmswell	Suffolk	52.22°N 00.89°E	TL9863
Elmton	Derbyshire	53.25°N 01.25°W	SK5073

=== Elp-Ely ===
Location	Locality	Coordinates (links to map & photo sources)	OS grid reference
Elphin	Highland	58.05°N 05.03°W	NC2111
Elphinstone	East Lothian	55.91°N 02.97°W	NT3970
Elrick	Aberdeenshire	57.14°N 02.29°W	NJ8206
Elrig	Dumfries and Galloway	54.79°N 04.61°W	NX3247
Elrington	Northumberland	54.96°N 02.22°W	NY8663
Elsdon	Herefordshire	52.18°N 02.99°W	SO3254
Elsdon	Northumberland	55.23°N 02.11°W	NY9393
Elsecar	Barnsley	53.49°N 01.42°W	SE3800
Elsenham	Essex	51.91°N 00.22°E	TL5326
Elsfield	Oxfordshire	51.78°N 01.21°W	SP5410
Elsham	North Lincolnshire	53.59°N 00.44°W	TA0312
Elsing	Norfolk	52.70°N 01.03°E	TG0516
Elslack	North Yorkshire	53.93°N 02.12°W	SD9249
Els Ness	Orkney Islands	59.22°N 02.57°W	HY673380
Elson	Hampshire	50.80°N 01.14°W	SU6001
Elson	Shropshire	52.90°N 02.92°W	SJ3835
Elsrickle	South Lanarkshire	55.67°N 03.49°W	NT0643
Elstead	Surrey	51.17°N 00.71°W	SU9043
Elsted	West Sussex	50.96°N 00.84°W	SU8119
Elstob	Durham	54.60°N 01.47°W	NZ3423
Elston	Devon	50.80°N 03.73°W	SS7802
Elston	Nottinghamshire	53.02°N 00.88°W	SK7548
Elston	Wiltshire	51.19°N 01.91°W	SU0644
Elstone	Devon	50.92°N 03.89°W	SS6716
Elstow	Bedfordshire	52.10°N 00.46°W	TL0546
Elstree	Hertfordshire	51.64°N 00.31°W	TQ1795
Elstronwick	East Riding of Yorkshire	53.77°N 00.15°W	TA2232
Elswick	Gateshead	54.96°N 01.65°W	NZ2263
Elswick	Lancashire	53.83°N 02.88°W	SD4238
Elswick Leys	Lancashire	53.82°N 02.88°W	SD4237
Elsworth	Cambridgeshire	52.24°N 00.08°W	TL3163
Elterwater	Cumbria	54.42°N 03.04°W	NY3204
Eltham	Greenwich	51.44°N 00.04°E	TQ4274
Eltham Park	Greenwich	51.457°N 00.058°E	TQ431752
Eltisley	Cambridgeshire	52.21°N 00.14°W	TL2759
Elton	Cambridgeshire	52.52°N 00.40°W	TL0893
Elton	Herefordshire	52.32°N 02.80°W	SO4570
Elton	Gloucestershire	51.81°N 02.45°W	SO6913
Elton	Stockton-on-Tees	54.54°N 01.38°W	NZ4017
Elton	Bury	53.58°N 02.31°W	SD7910
Elton	Cheshire	53.26°N 02.82°W	SJ4575
Elton	Derbyshire	53.13°N 01.67°W	SK2260
Elton Green	Cheshire	53.26°N 02.82°W	SJ4575
Elton on the Hill	Nottinghamshire	52.93°N 00.87°W	SK7638
Elton's Marsh	Herefordshire	52.08°N 02.74°W	SO4943
Eltringham	Northumberland	54.95°N 01.87°W	NZ0862
Elvanfoot	South Lanarkshire	55.43°N 03.66°W	NS9517
Elvaston	Derbyshire	52.88°N 01.39°W	SK4132
Elveden	Suffolk	52.38°N 00.67°E	TL8280
Elvet Hill	Durham	54.76°N 01.59°W	NZ2641
Elvingston	East Lothian	55.95°N 02.86°W	NT4674
Elvington	Kent	51.20°N 01.24°E	TR2750
Elvington	York	53.91°N 00.93°W	SE7047
Elwell	Devon	51.06°N 03.91°W	SS6631
Elwell	Dorset	50.65°N 02.48°W	SY6684
Elwick	Hartlepool	54.68°N 01.30°W	NZ4532
Elwick	Northumberland	55.61°N 01.82°W	NU1136
Elworth	Cheshire	53.14°N 02.39°W	SJ7461
Elworthy	Somerset	51.10°N 03.31°W	ST0835
Ely	Cambridgeshire	52.39°N 00.26°E	TL5480
Ely	Cardiff	51.47°N 03.25°W	ST1376
