= Eling =

Eling may refer to the following places:

- Eling, Berkshire, England
- Eling, Hampshire, England
- Eling Park, Chongqing

== See also ==
- Ealing (disambiguation)
- Eeling
