= Summer Isles (disambiguation) =

Summer Isles may refer to:

- The Summer Isles, a small archipelago in Scotland
- The Summer Isles, a novella by Ian R. MacLeod, later expanded into a novel. Both forms won the Sidewise Award.
- The Summer Isles, a region of the Known World in George R.R. Martin's A Song of Ice and Fire series

== The Wicker Man ==
- The Wicker Man (1973 film) is set on the fictional location of Summerisle in Scotland and includes the character Lord Summerisle
- The Wicker Man (2006 film) is set on the fictional location of Summersisle in the USA and includes the character Lady Summerisle

== See also ==
- The Somers Isles, an alternative name for Bermuda
- Somers Isles Company, which ran Bermuda as a commercial venture in the 17th century
- Summerisle, a Scottish indie pop band
