= Tanera Beag =

British and Scottish island

Tanera Beag (Gaelic)

Location
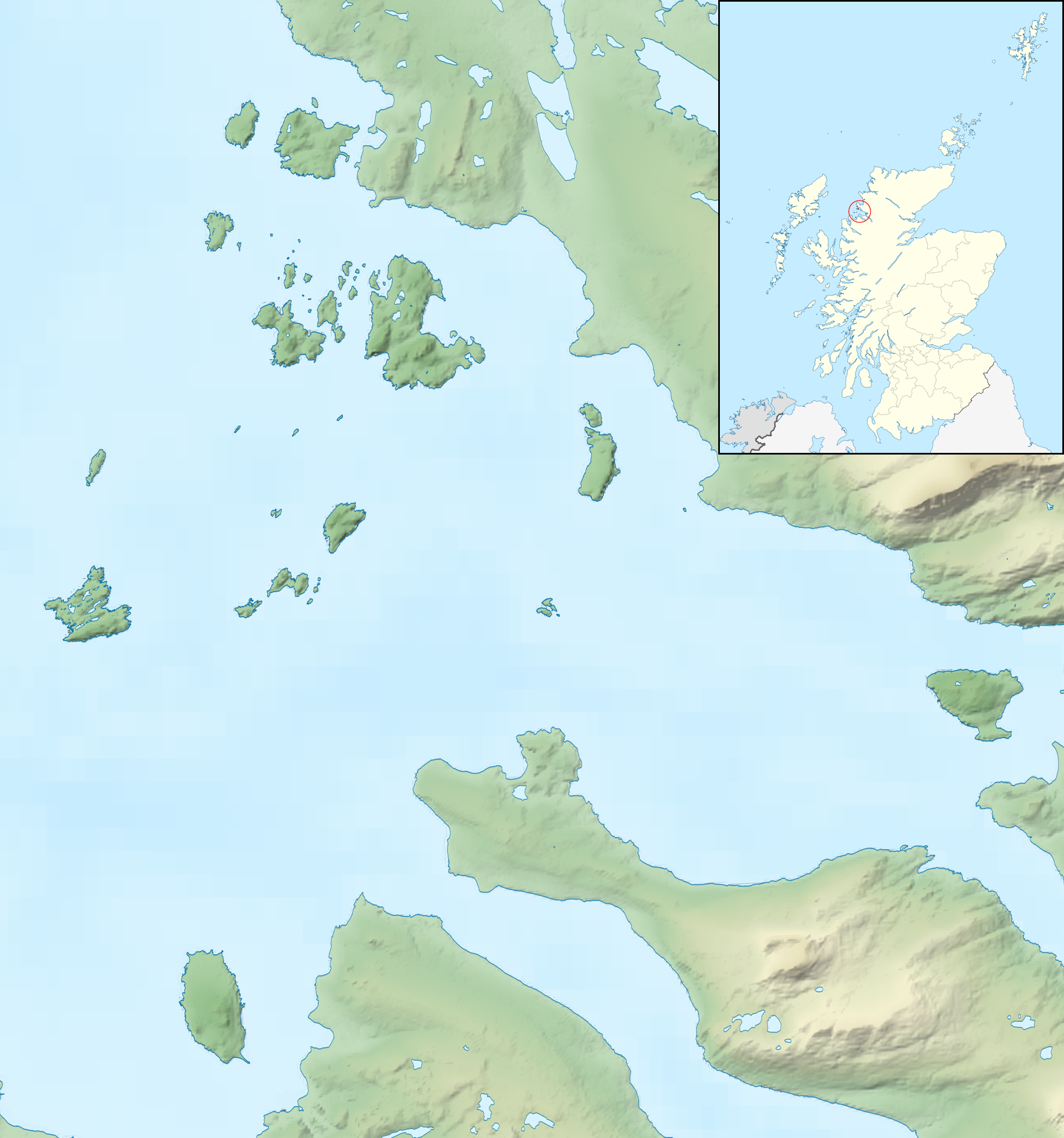
- Tanera Beag shown within the Summer Isles Tanera Beag shown within the Highlands
- OS grid reference: NB965074
- Coordinates: 58.01°N 5.44°W

Name
- Name meaning: "Harbour island", from Norse
- Old Norse name: hawnar-øy

Physical geography
- Island group: Summer Isles
- Area: 66 ha (1/4 sq mi)
- Area rank: 178=
- Highest elevation: 83 m (272 ft)

Administration
- Council area: Highland
- Country: Scotland
- Sovereign state: United Kingdom

Demographics
- Population: 0

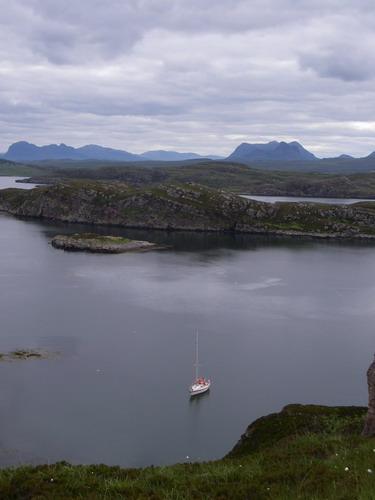
Eastern anchorage, Tanera Beag; Suilven and Cul Mòr are in the background

Tanera Beag or Tanera Beg is an uninhabited island in the Summer Isles off north west Scotland.

It is called "Tanera Beag" ("Little Tanera") to distinguish it from Tanera Mòr, "Big Tanera".
