= Ealing (disambiguation) =

Ealing is a suburb of London, England.

Ealing can also refer to:

- Ealing, New Zealand
- London Borough of Ealing
- Ealing (electoral division), Greater London Council
- Municipal Borough of Ealing
- Ealing (UK Parliament constituency)

== See also ==
- Ealing Studios
- Eling (disambiguation)
