= Eilean Dubh, Summer Isles =

Uninhabited island in Loch Broom in Scotland

Eilean Dubh
Eilein Dhuibh (Gaelic)

Location
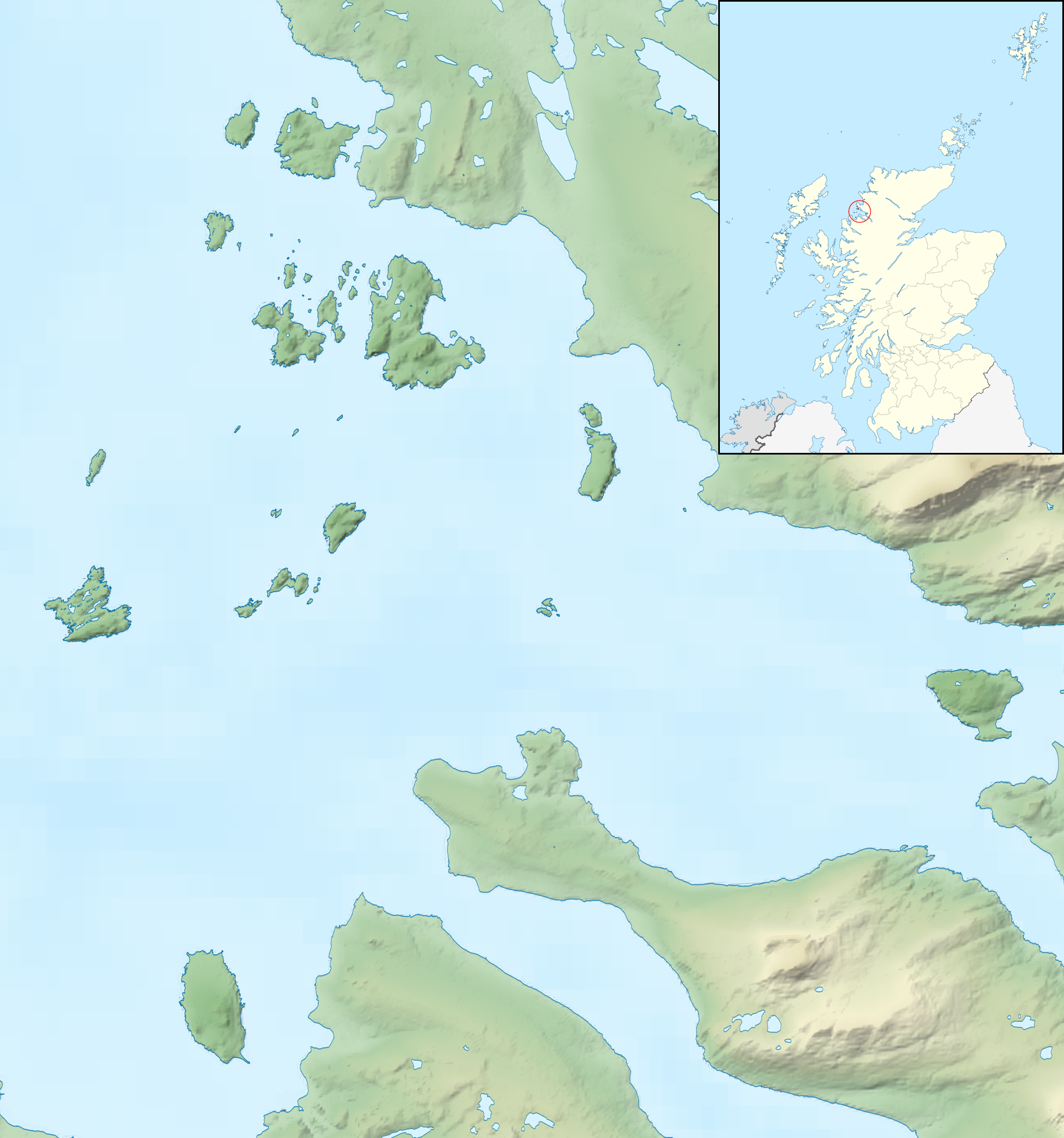
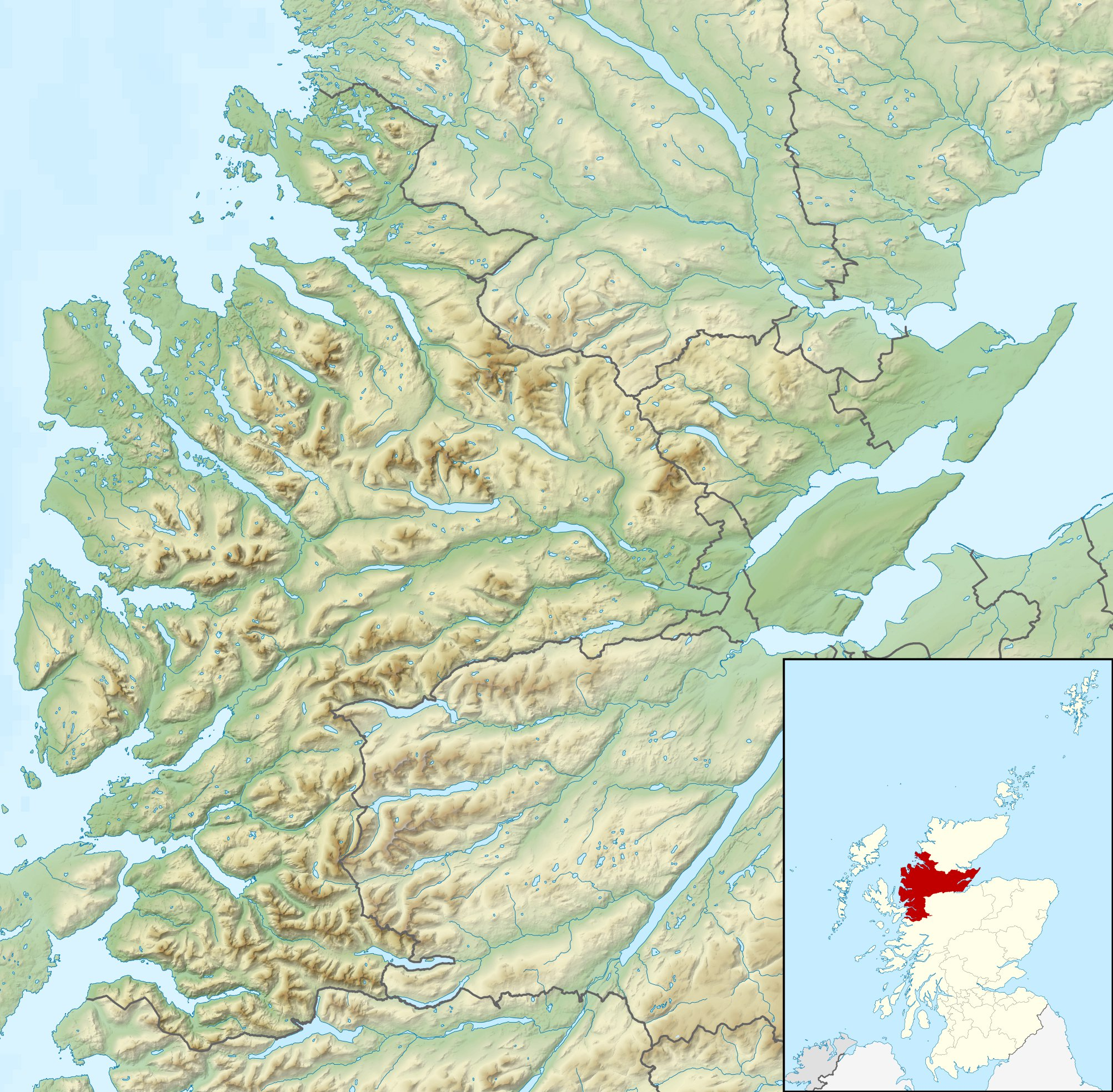
- Eilean Dubh shown within the Summer Isles Eilean Dubh shown within Ross and Cromarty
- OS grid reference: NB 972038
- Coordinates: 57.978°N 5.430°W

Name
- Name meaning: black island

Physical geography
- Island group: Summer Isles
- Area: 37 hectares (0.14 sq mi)
- Highest elevation: An Uspairn 87 metres (285 ft)

Administration
- Council area: Highland
- Country: Scotland
- Sovereign state: United Kingdom

Demographics
- Population: 0

Eilean Dubh is an uninhabited island in Loch Broom, one of the smaller Summer Isles. It lies about two miles south of Tanera Beag and has probably not been permanently occupied. Eilean Dubh is owned by Dr Van Arman, who built a substantial wooden chalet in the north-east cove.

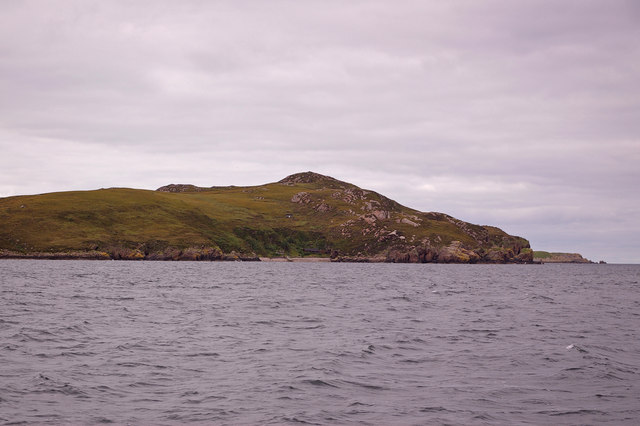
Eilean Dubh

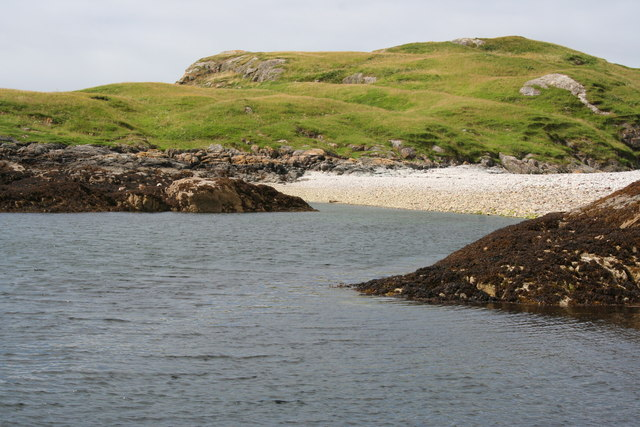
Beach on Eilein Dhuibh
