= Bottle Island =

One of the Summer Isles in Loch Broom, Scotland

Coordinates: 57°57′39″N 5°27′35″W

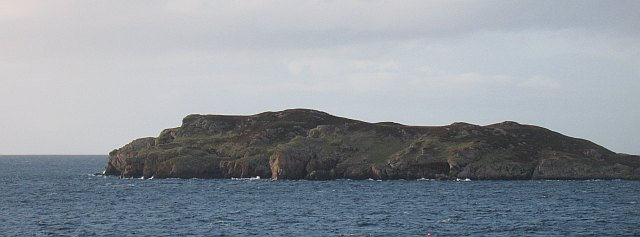

Location
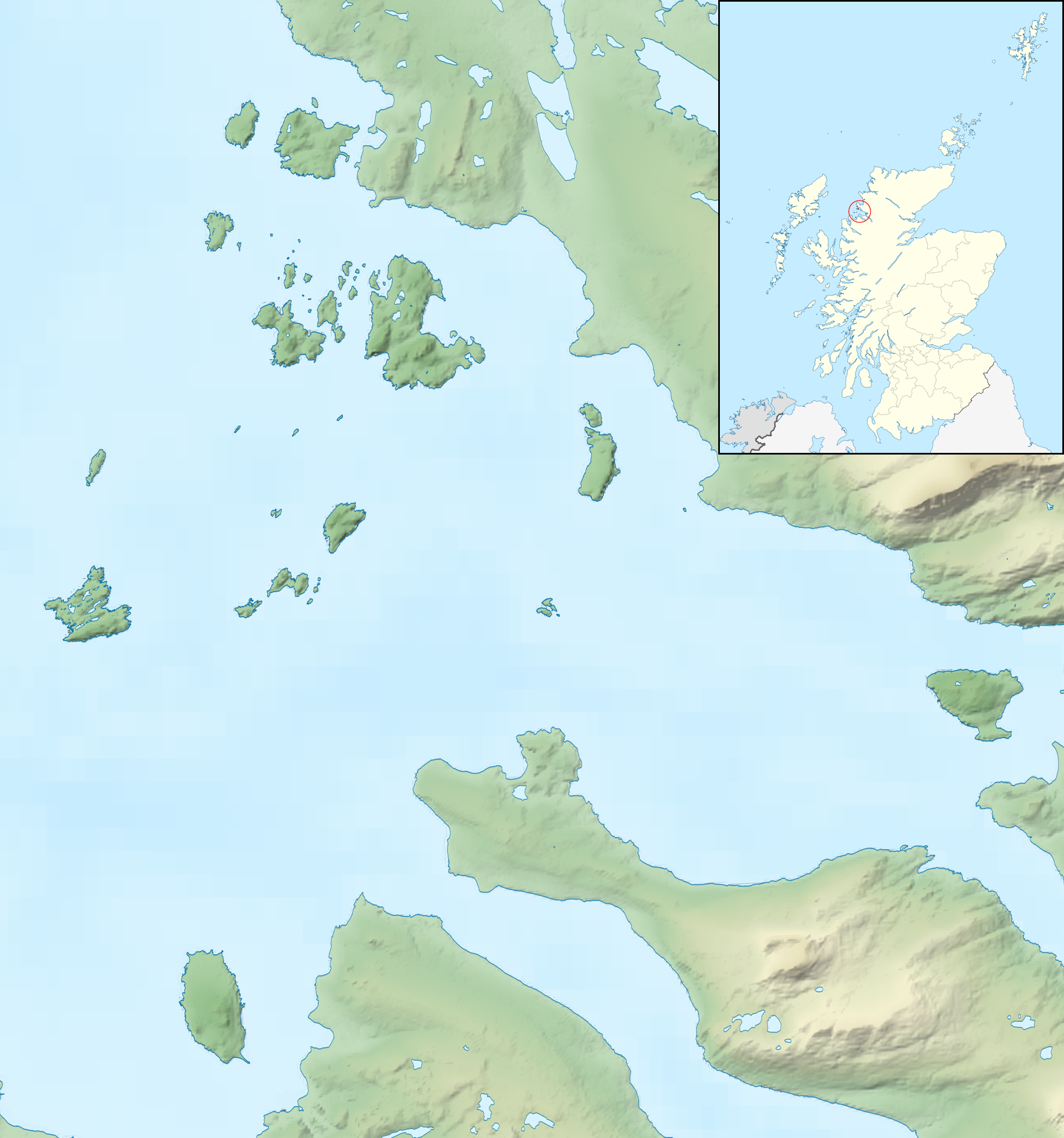
- Bottle Island shown within the Summer Isles Bottle Island shown within the Highlands
- OS grid reference: NB9541802002

Physical geography
- Island group: Summer Isles

Administration
- Council area: Highland
- Country: Scotland
- Sovereign state: United Kingdom

Bottle Island (Scottish Gaelic: Eilean a' Bhotail) is one of the Summer Isles in Loch Broom, Scotland. So called because of its shape, an alternative name is Eilean Druim Briste, "broken ridge island".

It is a popular dive site.
