= Eilean Mòr, Crowlin Islands =

Island of the Crowlin Islands, Scotland

Eilean Mòr
Eilean Mòr (Gaelic)

Location
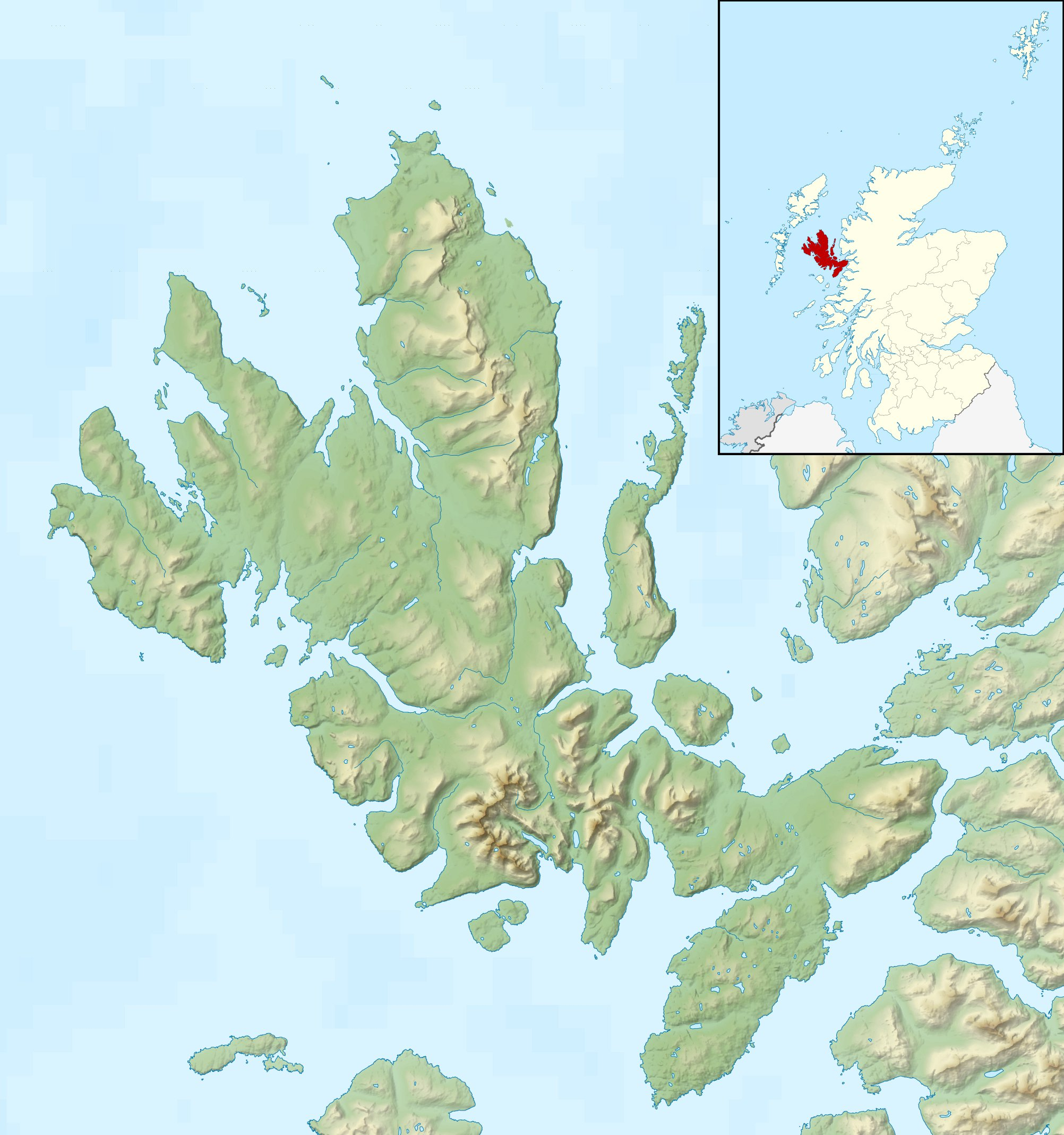
- Eilean Mòr shown relative to Skye
- OS grid reference: NG695343
- Coordinates: 57.34°N 05.83°W

Name
- Gaelic pronunciation: [ˈelan ˈmoːɾ]
- Name meaning: big island

Physical geography
- Island group: Skye
- Area: 170 ha (11/16 sq mi)
- Area rank: 118
- Highest elevation: Meall a' Chòis, 114 m (374 ft)

Administration
- Council area: Highland
- Country: Scotland
- Sovereign state: United Kingdom

Demographics
- Population: 0

Eilean Mòr is the largest of the Crowlin Islands in the Inner Sound off the Isle of Skye, Scotland.

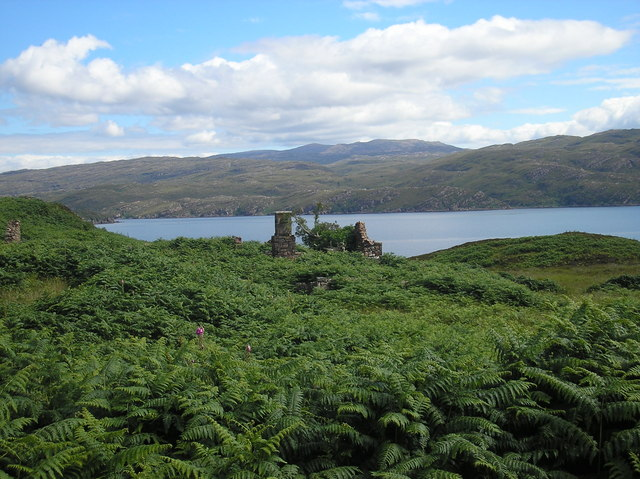
A ruined cottage on Eilean Mòr

Eilean Mòr is situated at the mouth of Loch Carron, off the south coast of Applecross in Wester Ross. It is connected to the adjacent Eilean Meadhonach at low tide.

Excavations on Eilean Mòr have shown evidence of human settlement in Mesolithic times 8,000 years ago. Ruined cottages can be seen in the north-east corner, near Camas na h-Annait (Scottish Gaelic: church bay). In the middle of the nineteenth century tenants were cleared from Applecross to make way for sheep. A group of families unwilling to take passage from Scotland to far-off lands were settled on Crowlin Mòr (Eilean Mòr), to make what living they could by fishing and farming. From about 1810 to 1920 Eilean Mòr was home to several families. In the course of time, the families slipped back to Applecross and the island has been uninhabited since about 1920.
