= Crowlin Islands =

Island group in the Inner Hebrides, Scotland

Coordinates: 57°21′N 5°50′W

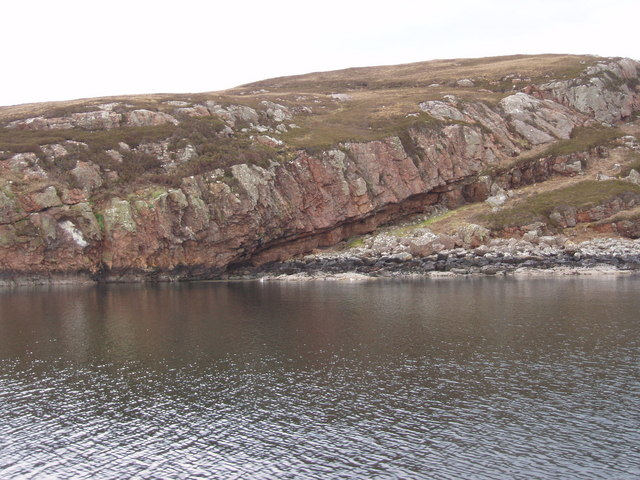
Eilean Mòr

The Crowlin Islands (Scottish Gaelic: Na h-Eileanan Cròlainneach) are a group of uninhabited islands in the Inner Hebrides of Scotland. They lie between Skye and the Applecross peninsula on the mainland.

The individual islands are:

- Eilean Mòr (big island)
- Eilean Meadhonach (middle island)
- Eilean Beag (little island)

== Prehistory ==
Between 1999 and 2004 a large scale archaeological project, Scotland's First Settlers, was undertaken in the Inner Sound to locate and examine sites relating to the Mesolithic period in the strait. The entire coastline of the Inner Sound together with its islands was walked by volunteers and archaeologists. On the Crowlin Islands they found six caves and rock shelters with evidence of prehistoric habitation. The midden at Crowlin 1 suggested sporadic activity from the Iron Age into the 16th century AD. Three other sites produced evidence for post-medieval occupation.

Excavations on Eilean Mòr have shown evidence of human settlement in the Mesolithic. Ruined cottages can be seen in the north-east corner, near Camas na h-Annait.

== History ==
From about 1810 to 1920 Eilean Mòr was home for several families, evicted from Applecross, but unwilling to take passage from Scotland to far-off lands. By agreement with the landowning Mackenzie laird they were allowed to settle on the islands and make what living they could by fishing, pasturing sheep, gathering kelp and farming. The ruins of drystone shielings and a chapel are still visible on the islands.

The steam trawler the Scomber was sunk off the coast of Eilean Beag in 1923, though the exact location of the wreck is unknown.

== Images ==
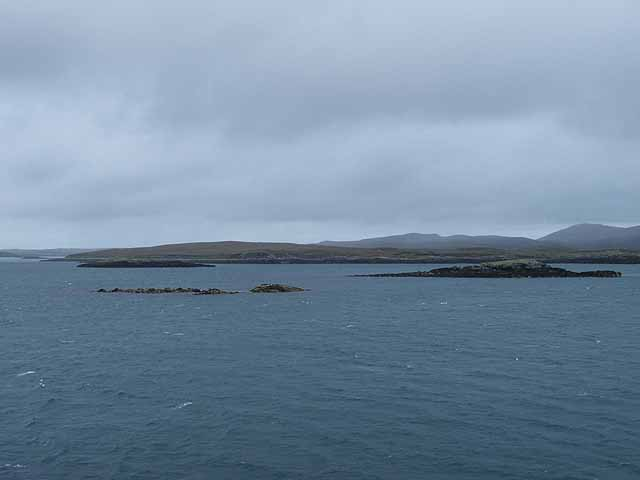

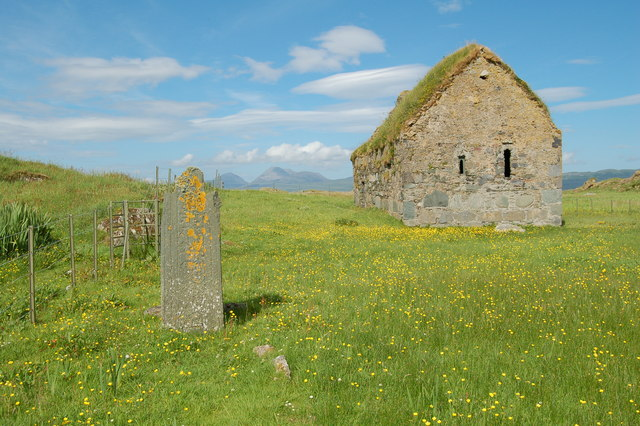

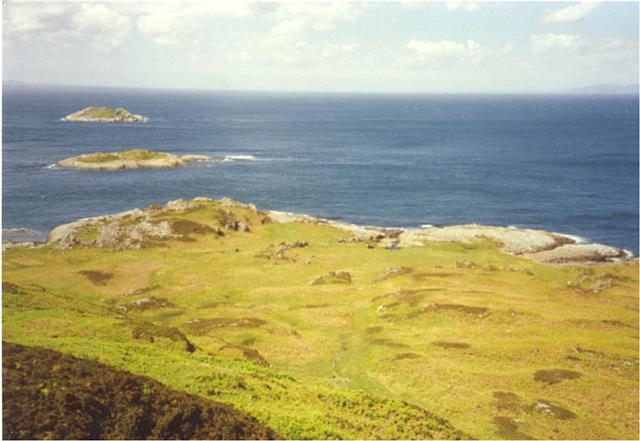

== See also ==
- List of islands of Scotland
