= Eilean Mullagrach =

Island in the Summer Isles of Scotland

Coordinates: 58°2′50.17″N 5°27′39.82″W

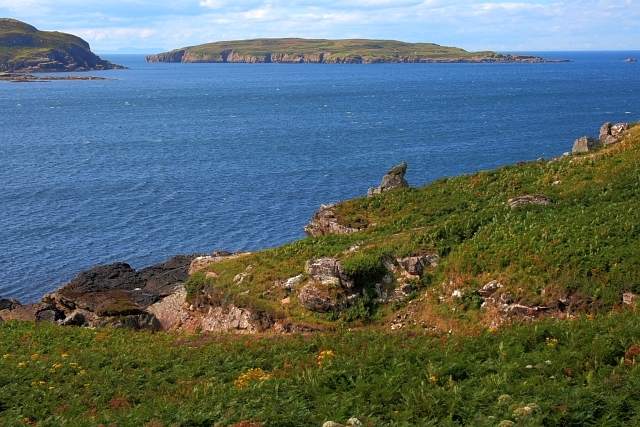

Location
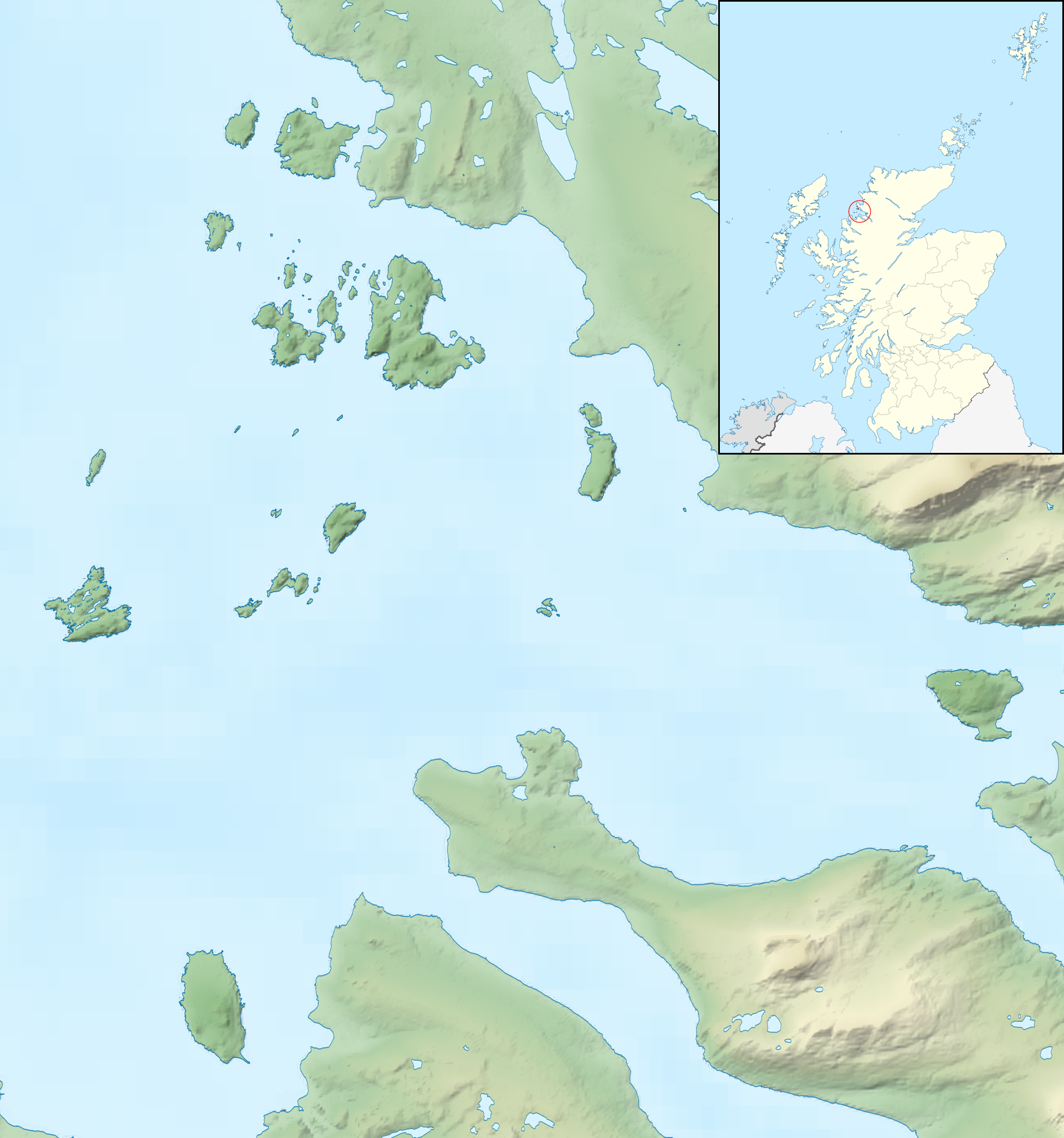
- Eilean Mullagrach shown within the Summer Isles Eilean Mullagrach shown within the Highlands

Physical geography
- Area: 39 hectares (0.15 sq mi)
- Highest elevation: 46 metres (151 ft)

Administration
- Council area: Highland
- Country: Scotland
- Sovereign state: United Kingdom

Eilean Mullagrach is an island in the Summer Isles of Scotland. It is located in Highland council area, in the northwestern part of the country, 800 km northwest of the United Kingdom capital London. It is the most northerly of the Summer Isles. Its area is 39 hectares (Note: The Gazetteer for Scotland states 75 ha and "Rick Livingstone's Tables" has 29 ha but the BBC's estimate corresponds more closely to an approximation from Ordnance Survey maps. Haswell-Smith does not include it in his tables of islands greater in area than 40 ha.) and the maximum elevation is 46 metres (151 ft).

In 2024 the island, which has a small cabin and landing point with ladders for a small boat, was put up for sale for "offers over £500,000".

Bird life on the island includes kittiwakes, bonxies, shags and fulmars.

== Gallery ==
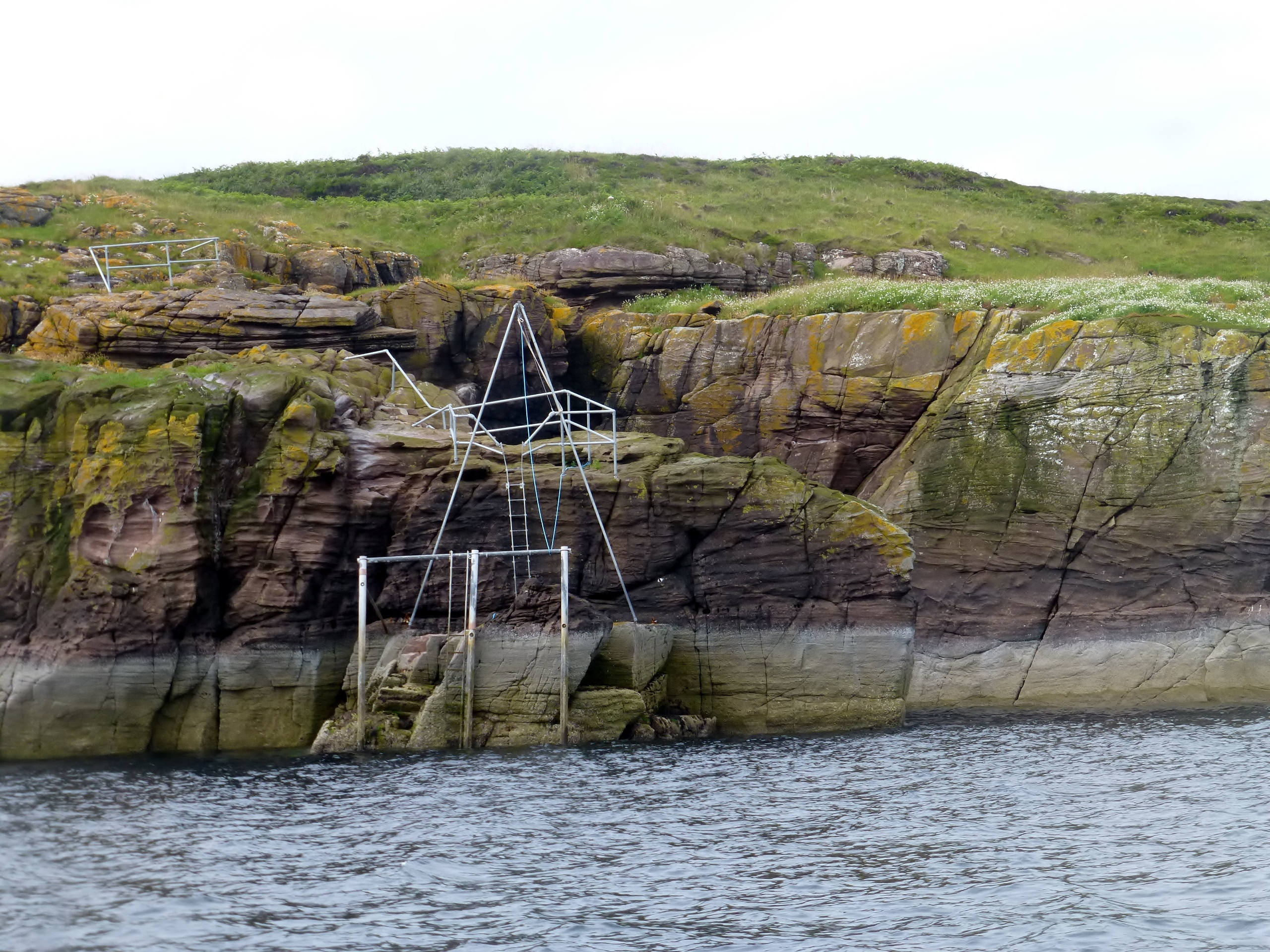
The landing point

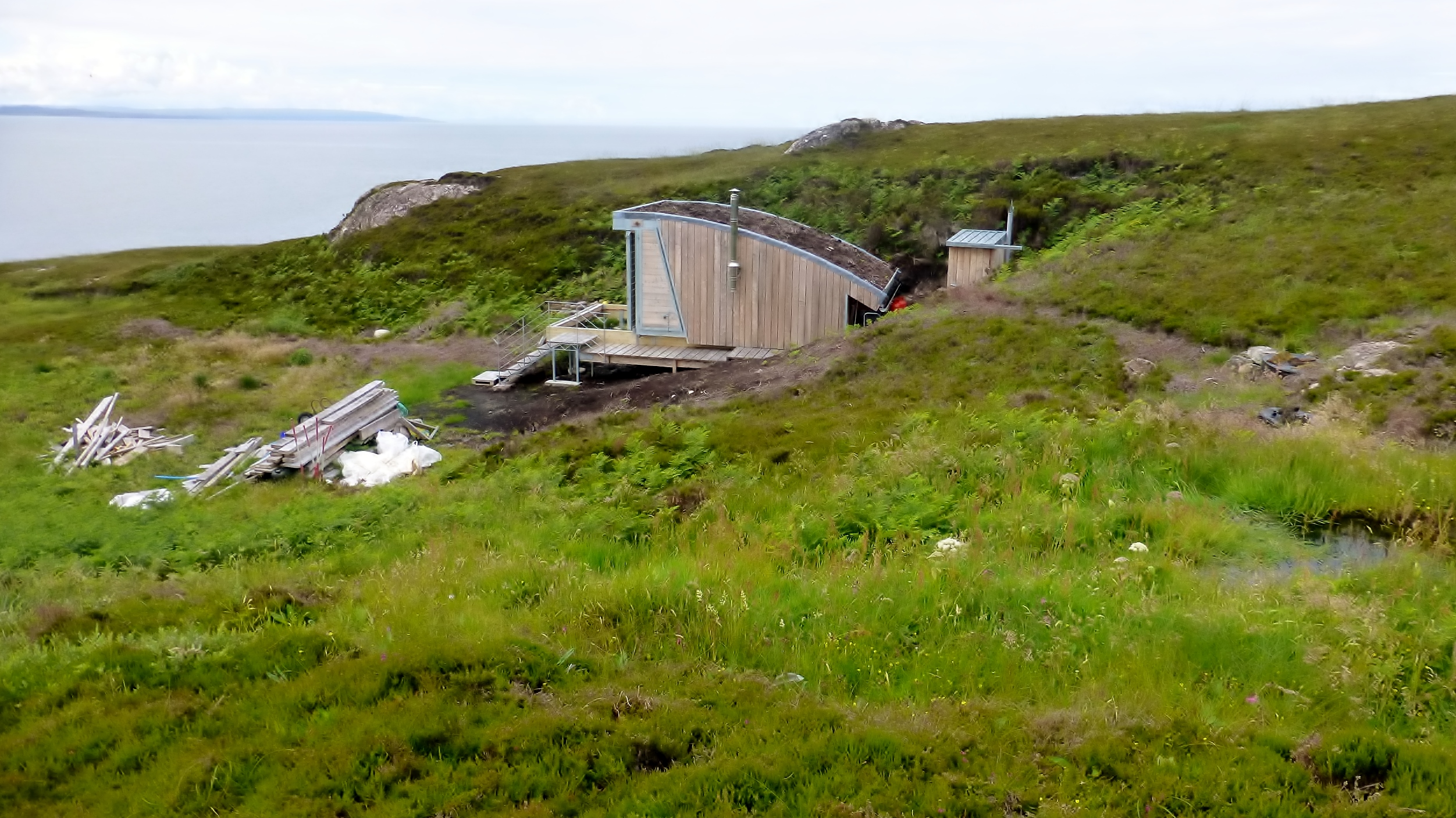
The cabin

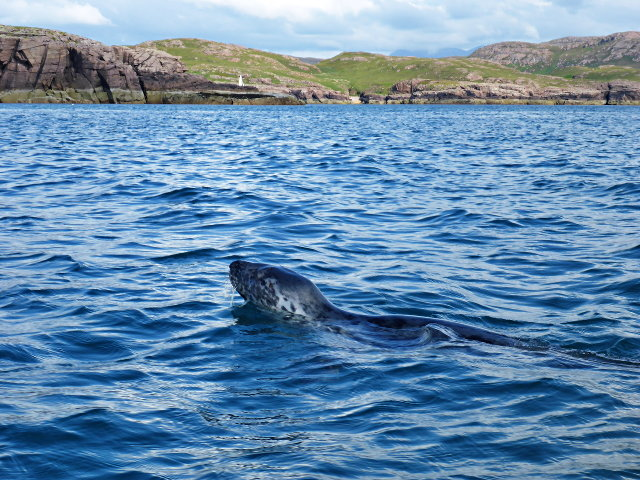
Grey seal near the island

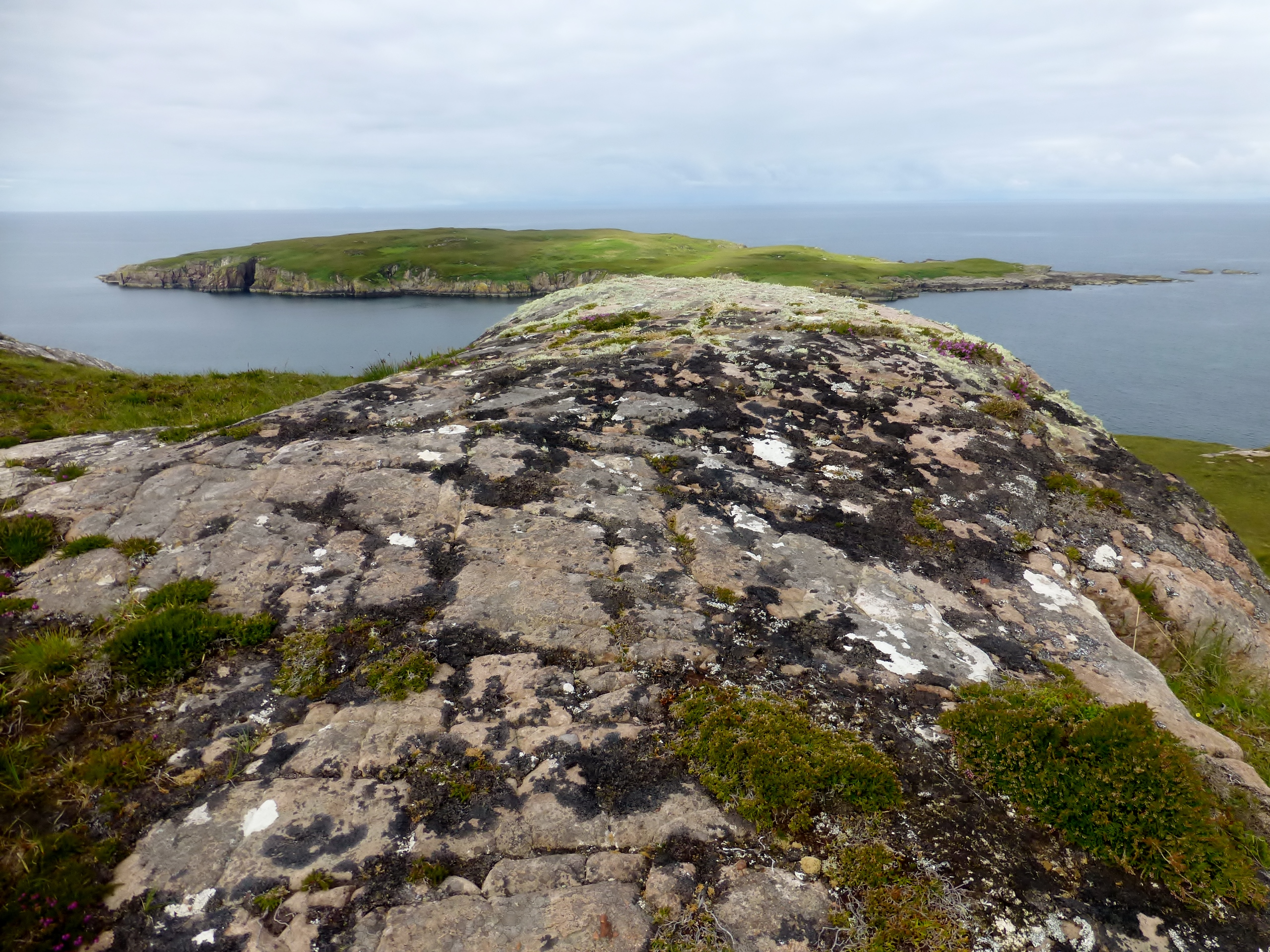
Eilean Mullagrach from Isle Ristol
