= Tanera Mòr =

Sporadically inhabited island in Loch Broom in the Inner Hebrides of Scotland

Tannara Mòr (Gaelic)

Location
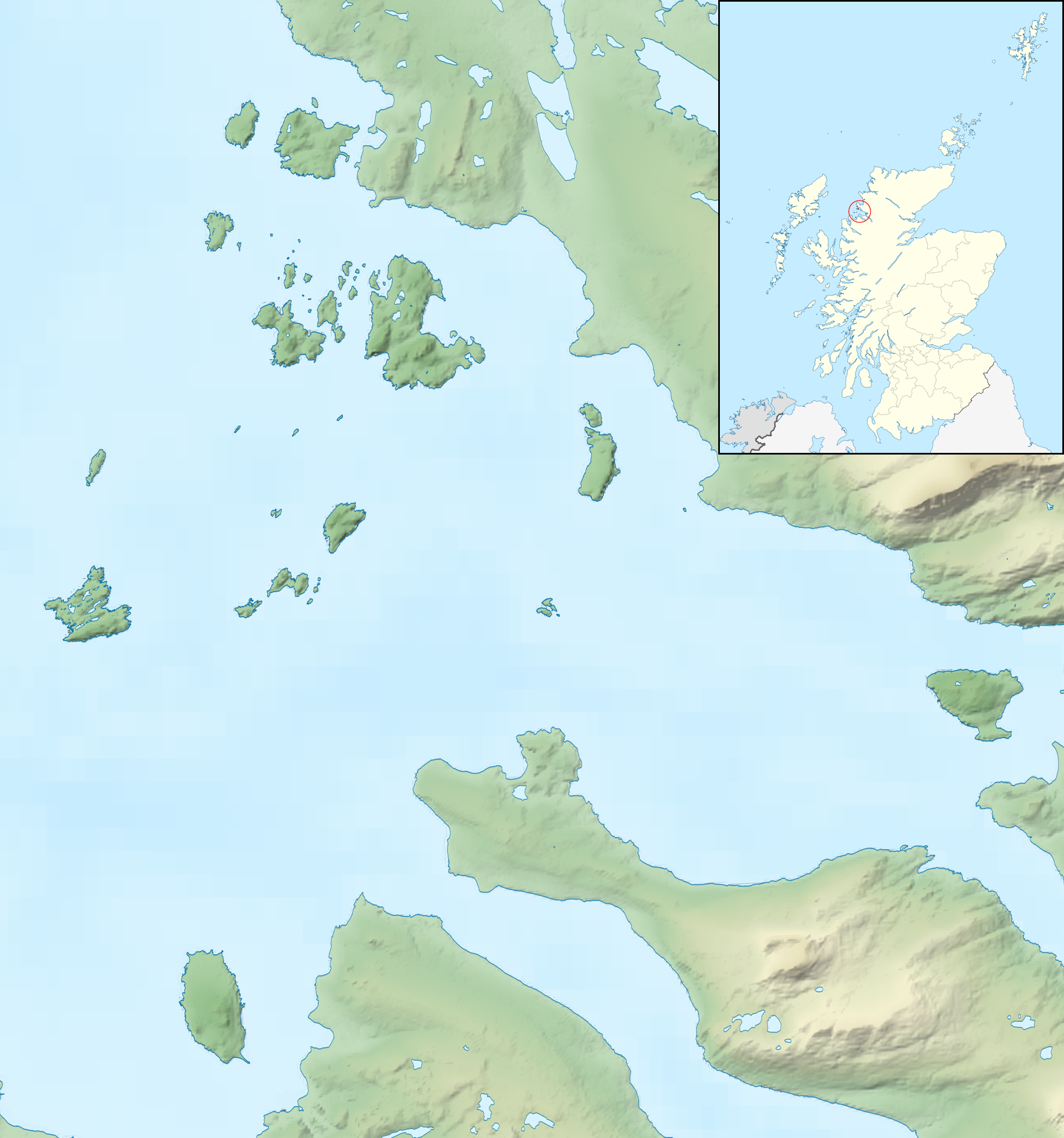
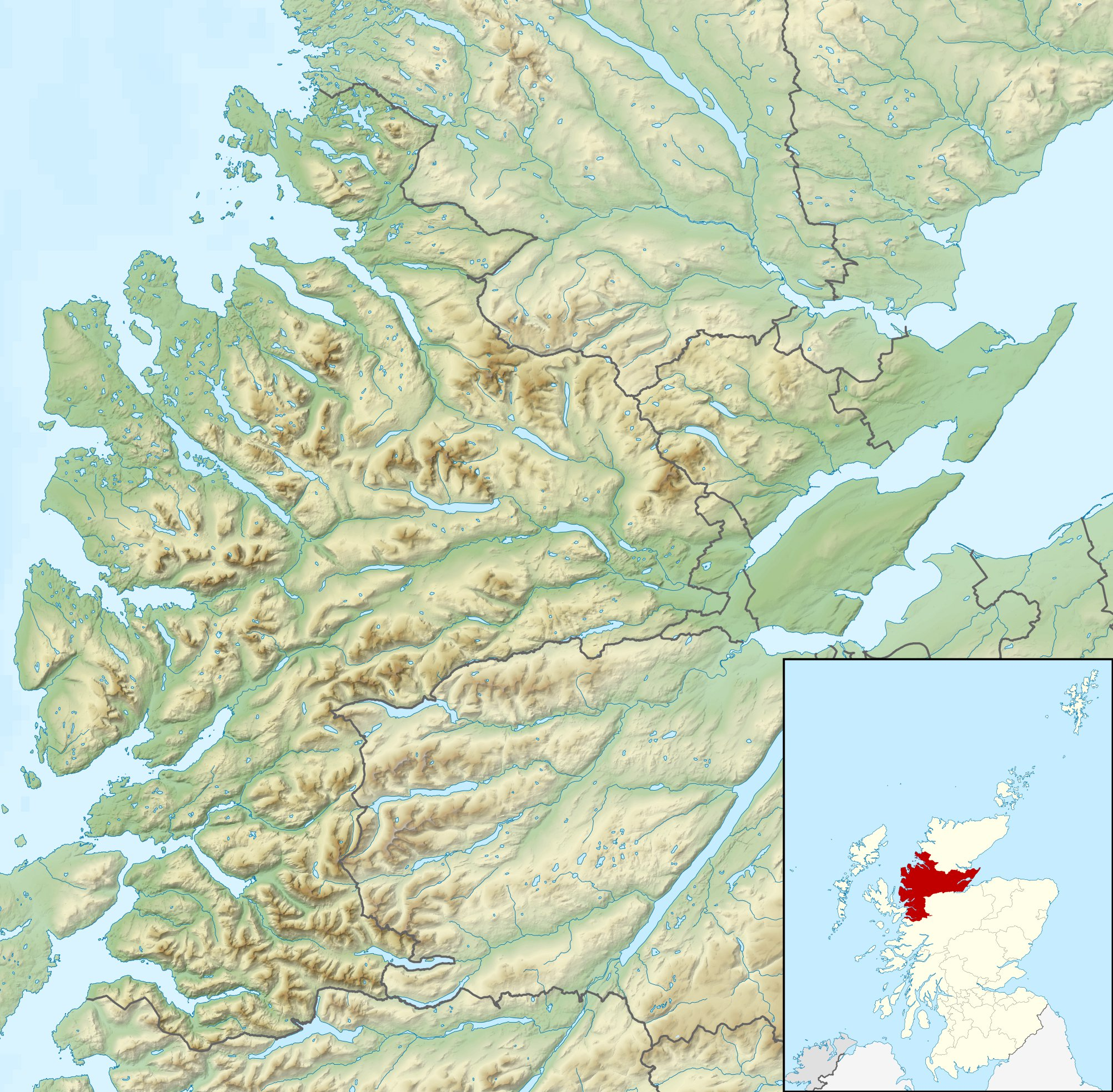
- Location within Summer Isles & Gruinard Island Location within Ross and Cromarty
- OS grid reference: NB992067
- Coordinates: 58.01°N 5.42°W

Name
- Name meaning: "Harbour island", from Norse

Physical geography
- Island group: Summer Isles
- Area: 310 ha (1 1/4 sq mi)
- Area rank: 86
- Highest elevation: Meall Mòr, 124 m (407 ft)

Administration
- Council area: Highland
- Country: Scotland
- Sovereign state: United Kingdom

Demographics
- Population: 4 (2011) 0 (2014)
- Population rank: 77 (2011)
- Population density: 3.2/km^{2} (8.3/sq mi)

Tanera Mòr (Scottish Gaelic: Tannara Mòr) is a sporadically inhabited island in Loch Broom in the Inner Hebrides of Scotland, the largest of the Summer Isles. It was the last permanently inhabited island in that group. Tanera Mòr has issued its own postage stamps and was the location of Frank Fraser Darling's book Island Years. In 2014, it was reported that it was purchased by Ian Wace, with the intention of regenerating the decaying island.

== Geography ==
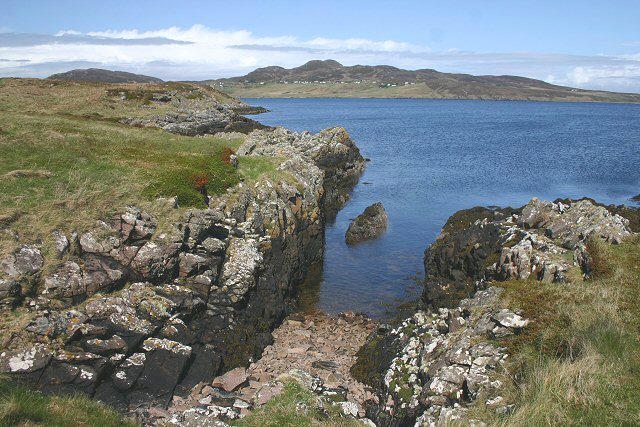
Looking northwards from Rubh' Ard-na-goine on Tanera Mòr. The village of Polbain can be seen on the mainland in the distance.

Tanera Mòr is around 310 hectares (766 acres) and reaches a height of 124 metres (407 feet). The highest hill is Meall Mòr (a common Scottish mountain name, meaning a "big rounded hill").

The rock is Torridonian sandstone covered with peat and pasture.

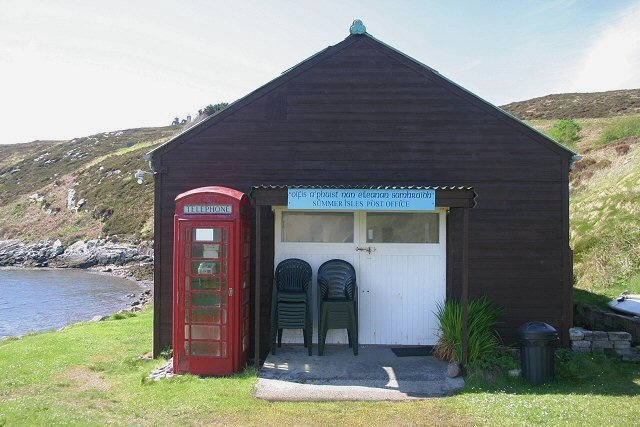
The post office and café.

== History ==
The island was a port for herring fishing, and suffered the decline of that industry. The two settlements were known as Ardnagoine and Garadheancal.

In 1881, 118 people lived on Tanera Mòr, all of whom had left by 1931 (one year after St Kilda was abandoned). The island was bought in the early 1960s by Ken Frampton.

There was intermittent permanent habitation since the island was abandoned, with six people identified as resident in 1961, eight in 1981, none in 1991 and five at the 2001 census and four in 2011.

In September 2012 the island's owners, Lizzie and Richard Williams, were considering a community buyout with residents on the mainland nearby. The price to the Coigach development trust was assessed at £2.6 million. This proposal did not progress, however, and the island was placed on the open market in May 2013 for £2.5 million. By 2014 the price had been dropped to £1.95 million by owners Richard and Lizzie Williams, the last residents, who had moved to the mainland.

In June 2017, Ian Wace purchased the island for £1.7 million, far less than the £2.5 million asking price when it was put on the market in 2013. The island was overgrown with bracken, moss and brambles, had an abandoned herring station but no proper roads; he said he thought "it was an extraordinary place". It was reported that he would oversee a four-year development of Tanera Mòr, which could become an "idyllic retreat capable of hosting up to 60 paying guests".

In the eight years to 2025 Wace is reported to have invested about £100m to regenerate the island, supporting the local community, with the purposes of rural and community regeneration, environmental restoration and protection, and support for public service. As of 2025 130 people, mostly in their 30s, were on the island working on the project to restore the island. This has included building five kilometres of roads and renovating a dozen derelict buildings. The former café and post office became the epicentre of the island's communal life. Ruined cottages were restored using traditional carpentry and stonemasonry skills, hand-building and repurposing where possible. Chrome basins in the cinema's bathroom are repurposed from wartime German U-boats. Tobin Irvine, who lived on Tanera as a teenager, in 2025 was leading the regeneration and communities group at the organisation regenerating Tanera, Summer Isles Enterprises, owned by the Jagclif Charitable Trust.

== Facilities and infrastructure ==
Tanera Mòr is home to a salmon fish farm, several holiday cottages, a small sailing school, a café and a post office, which has operated its own local post and printed its own stamps since 1970. The island previously had no roads, and the only recognisable path went around An Acarsaid ("The Anchorage"), the sheltered bay on the east side of the island.

Since 2017, the redevelopment of the island has involved the creation of several roads. Tanera Mòr, like the other Summer Isles, can be seen from the Stornoway to Ullapool ferry. The island can be reached by boat from either Achiltibuie in Wester Ross, or Ullapool.

== Literary references ==
Tanera Mòr was the location for Frank Fraser Darling's book Island Years (published 1940), which describes experiences living on a remote island. Living in Tanera Mòr and Dundonnell before that, Fraser Darling began the work that was to mark him as a naturalist-philosopher of original turn of mind and great intellectual drive. He described the social and breeding behaviour of the red deer, gulls, and the grey seal respectively, in the three academic works A Herd of Red Deer, Bird Flocks and the Breeding Cycle and A Naturalist on Rona. The outbreak of World War II put an end to Fraser Darling's hopes of undertaking further research on the grey seal, and being too old for active military service, he chose to farm rather than leave the west coast of Scotland for wartime civilian work. Between 1939 and 1943 Fraser Darling reclaimed derelict land to agricultural production on Tanera Mòr in the Summer Isles, an undertaking described in his 1943 book Island Farm. In 1942 the wartime Secretary of State for Scotland, Tom Johnston, asked Fraser Darling if he would run an agricultural advisory programme in the crofting areas of the Scottish Highlands and Islands. He agreed, and for two years he travelled, taught and wrote articles that were later published in book form as Crofting Agriculture.

The pagan-cult island of Summerisle featured in the motion picture The Wicker Man (filmed 1973) is thought by some film critics to be set in this archipelago, although the movie itself was filmed in Galloway and Skye.

Tanera Mòr and the Summer Isles feature lightly in the novel 'The Summer Isles' by Philip Marsden (2019). Marsden writes about his voyage from Cornwall around Ireland's West coast to the North of Scotland. Marsden paints a haunting picture of his journey, discussing themes of loss, grief, liminality and communion with the sea.

The Summer Isles feature in a novella of the same name by Ian R. MacLeod. Tanera Mòr also serves as the setting for the novella Ailie's Island by Antal Khripko (2023).

== Wildlife ==
The island's floral diversity is strong due to the lack of grazing over the last 25 years, with northern marsh orchids and greater butterfly-orchids particularly strong. Eurasian otters are active, whilst common and grey seals frequently visit from the other nearby Summer Isles, and basking sharks and porpoises pass by in summer. Bird species include common eider, grey heron, red grouse, and common buzzards.

== See also ==
- List of islands of Scotland
