= Elland Upper Edge =

Village in West Yorkshire, England

Coordinates: 53.683°N 1.814°W

- Dewsbury Road, looking east

- Location within West Yorkshire
- Metropolitan borough: Calderdale
- Metropolitan county: West Yorkshire
- Region: Yorkshire and the Humber
- Country: England
- Sovereign state: United Kingdom
- Police: West Yorkshire
- Fire: West Yorkshire
- Ambulance: Yorkshire

Elland Upper Edge is a village on the B6114 road, near the town of Elland, in the Calderdale district, in the English county of West Yorkshire.

== Amenities ==
Baptist church

Elland Upper Edge has one church, Upper Edge Baptist Church, and a pub, The Rock Tavern.
