= Summer Isles =

Archipelago in the Highland region of Scotland

Na h-Eileanan Samhraidh (Gaelic)
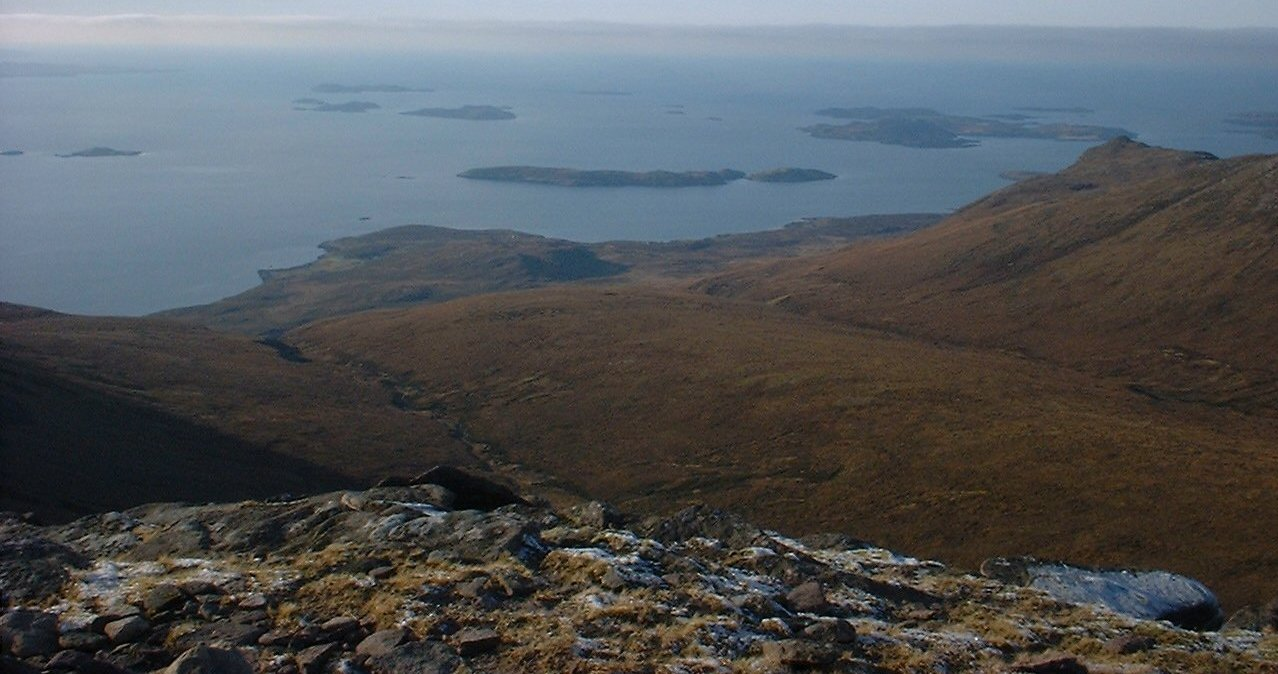
- The Summer Isles from Ben Mòr Coigach

Location
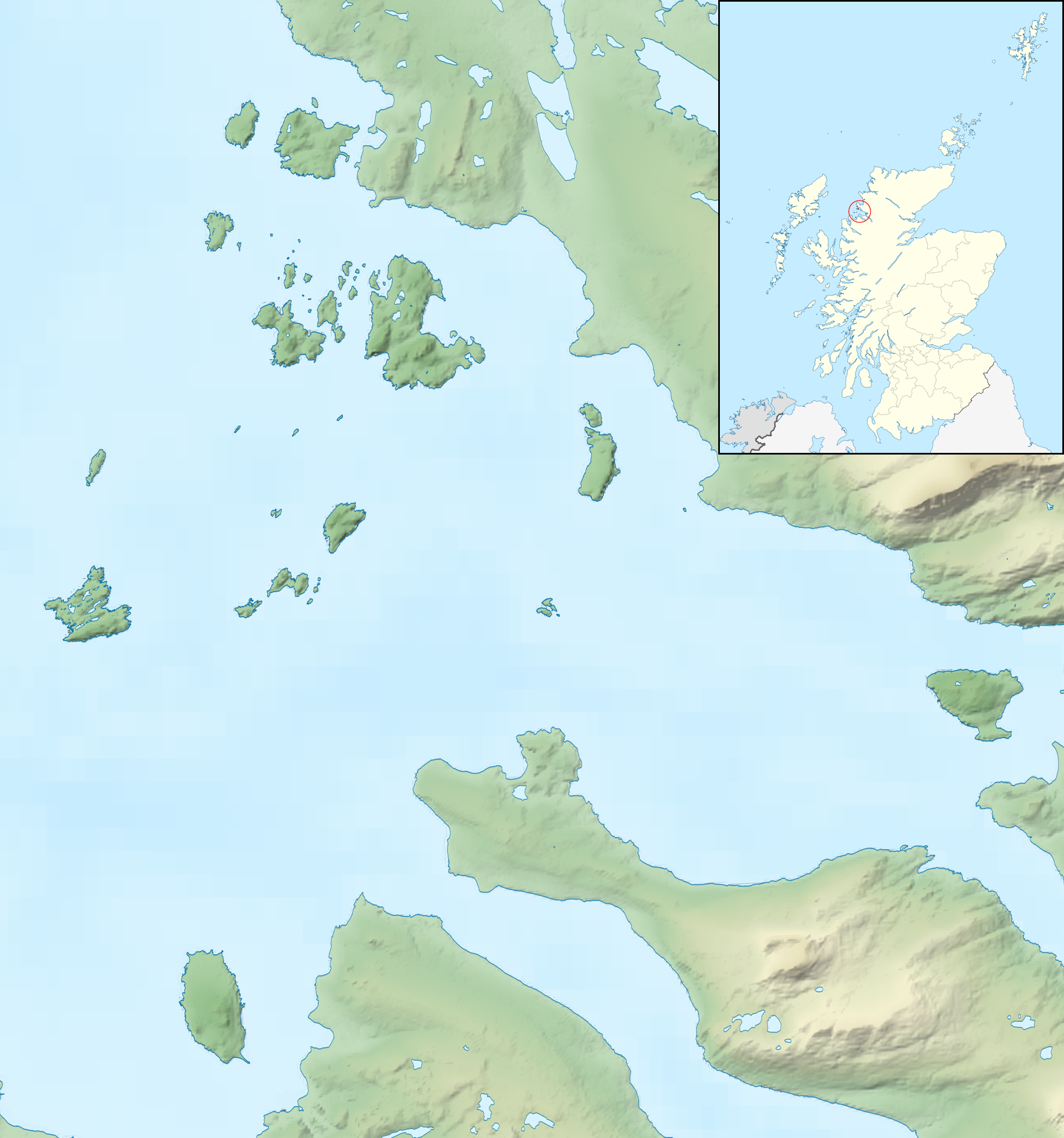
- Map of the Summer Isles, alongside Gruinard Island Summer Isles shown within Scotland
- OS grid reference: NB992067
- Coordinates: 58.02°N 5.44°W

Name
- Gaelic pronunciation: [nə ˈhelanən ˈs̪ãũɾɪ]

Administration
- Council area: Highland
- Country: Scotland
- Sovereign state: United Kingdom

Demographics
- Population: 0

The Summer Isles (Scottish Gaelic: Na h-Eileanan Samhraidh, pronounced [nə ˈhelanən ˈs̪ãũɾɪ]) are an archipelago lying in the mouth of Loch Broom, in the Highland region of Scotland.

== Geography ==
Tanera Mòr is the largest island and was the last one to remain inhabited. It was formerly home to an Atlantic salmon fish farm, some rental holiday homes, a café and a post office, which operated its own local post and printed its own stamps from 1970 until 2013, but a new set is planned for 2016. The island has no roads, and the only recognisable path goes around the Anchorage, the sheltered bay on the east side of the island. Boats sail to the island from Achiltibuie and Ullapool.

=== Other islands ===
- Bò Bhùiridh
- Bottle Island
- Càrn Deas
- Càrn Iar
- Càrn nan Sgeir
- Eilean a' Chàr
- Eilean Choinaid
- Eilean Dubh
- Eilean Fada Beag
- Eilean Fada Mòr
- Eilean Mullagrach
- Eilean na Saille
- Glas-leac Beag
- Glas-leac Mòr
- Horse Island
- Iolla Mhòr
- Isle Martin
- Isle Ristol
- Meall nan Caorach
- Meall nan Gabhar
- Priest Island (Eilean a' Chlèirich)
- Sgeir an Aon Iomairt
- Sgeir Bhuidhe Mòr
- Sgeir Loisgte
- Sgeir nam Mult
- Sgeir Ribhinn
- Sgeirean Glasa
- Stac Mhic Aonghais
- Tanera Beag

== Conservation ==
The islands are part of the Assynt-Coigach National Scenic Area, one of 40 in Scotland.

Frank Fraser Darling, an important figure in the development of Scottish conservation, lived on Tanera Mòr for two years in the 1930s. His book, Island Years (published 1940), records his time in the Summer Isles, painting Priest Island as a place of great beauty as well as great wildlife.

== Literature, film, and music ==
- The Summer Isles feature in a novella of the same name by Ian R. MacLeod.
- The fictional Summer Isle, Cladach Duillich (Sad Shore), features in the 1977 Desmond Bagley novel The Enemy.
- The third movement of a guitar suite, "The Great Western Road," on the album of the same name by Tim Slemmons, is entitled, "III. Evening in the Summer Isles."
- The Children's Film Foundation (CFF) The Big Catch (1968) features a group of boys who plan to sail to The Summer Isles to capture a wild pony. Filming took place in and around Ullapool and Lochinver.
- The pagan island of "Summerisle" featured in the motion picture The Wicker Man (filmed in 1973 and directed by Robin Hardy) is sometimes mistakenly associated with this archipelago, but in actuality The Wicker Man was filmed around Newton Stewart in Dumfries and Galloway.

== Summer Isles Philatelic Bureau ==
Since 1970 the Summer Isles Philatelic Bureau has been issuing stamps of the islands for tourists who place them on mail to be carried to the nearest GPO Post Box on the mainland.

== Culture ==
The musician Mairearad Green grew up in Achiltibuie on the Coigach peninsula, overlooking the Summer Isles. She has released an album entitled Summer Isles.

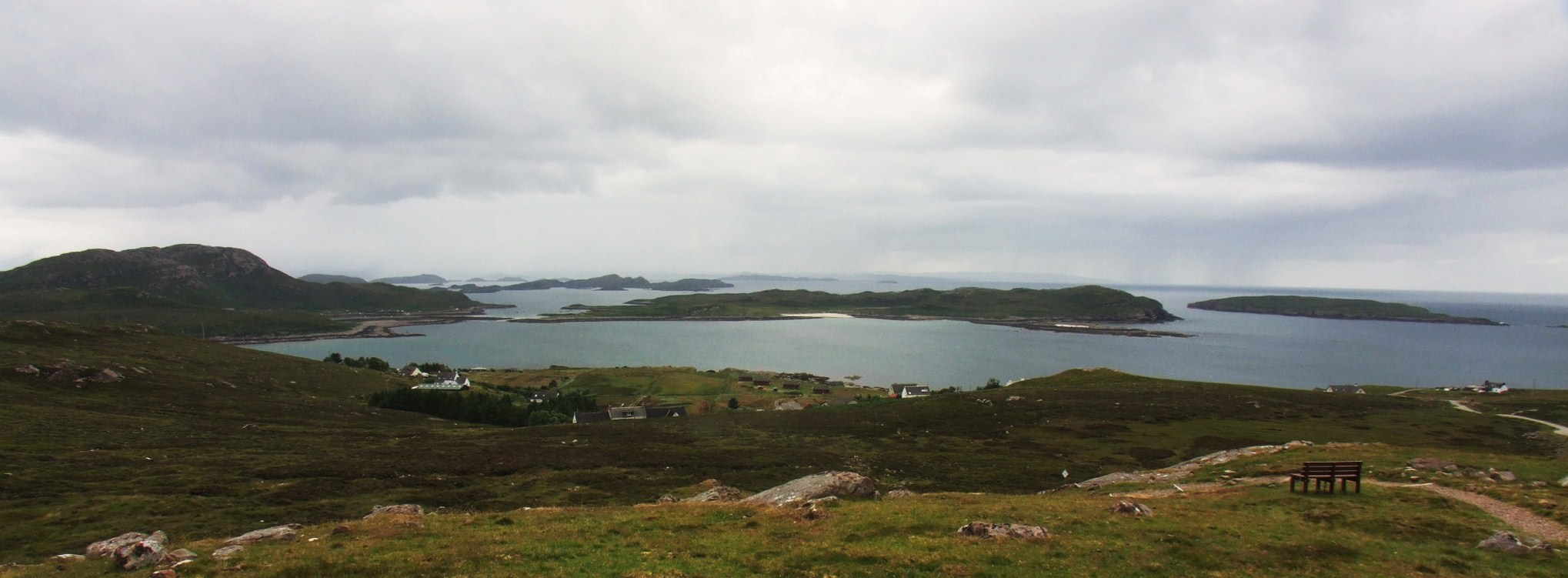
View south, over Altandhu and in Loch an Alltain Duibh, of the Summer Isles. Isle Ristol is in the foreground with Eilean Mullagrach to the right.

== See also ==
- List of islands of Scotland
