= Isle Ristol =

Innermost of the Summer Isles in Scotland

Eilean Ruisteil (Gaelic)
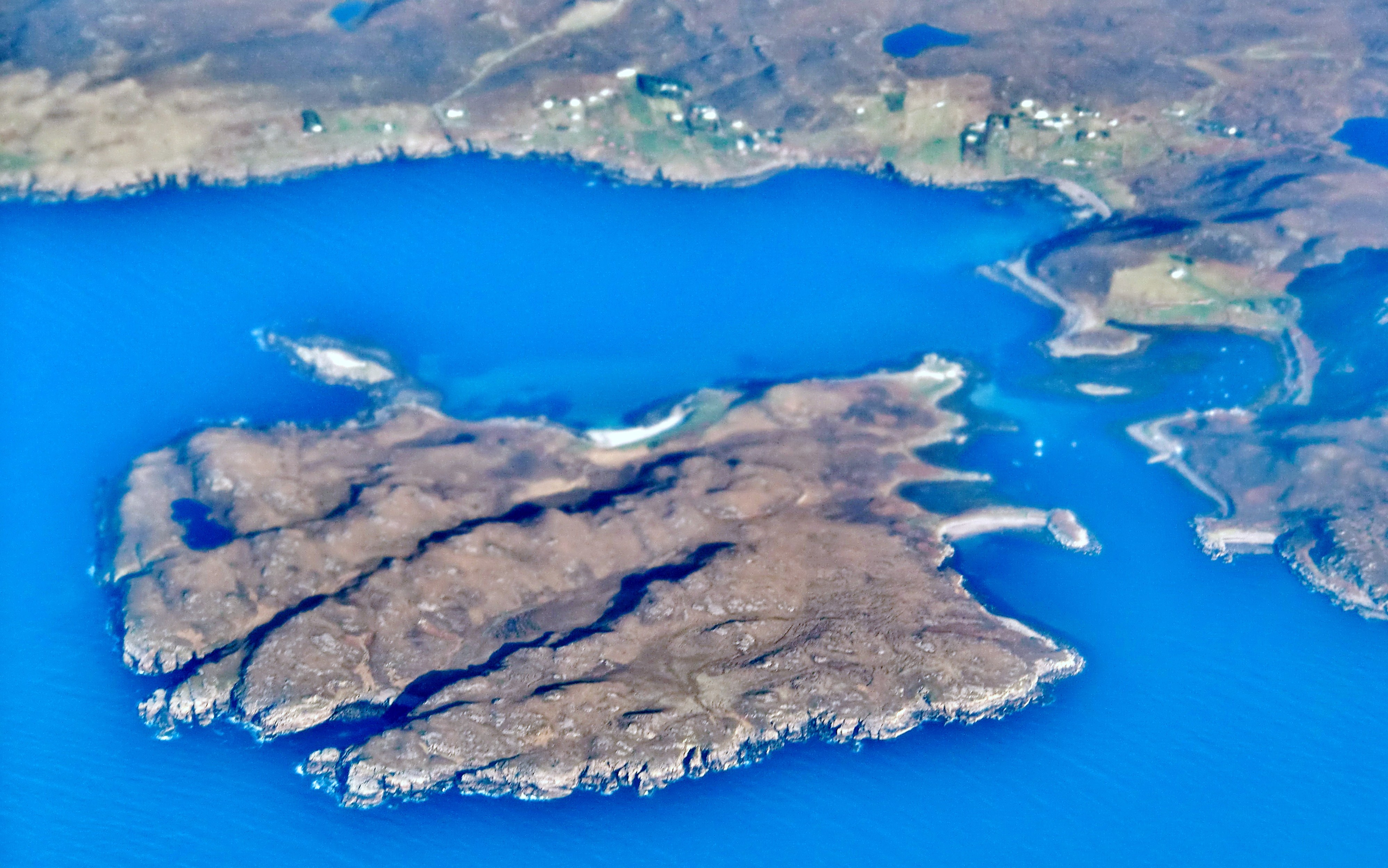
- Isle Ristol from the air

Location
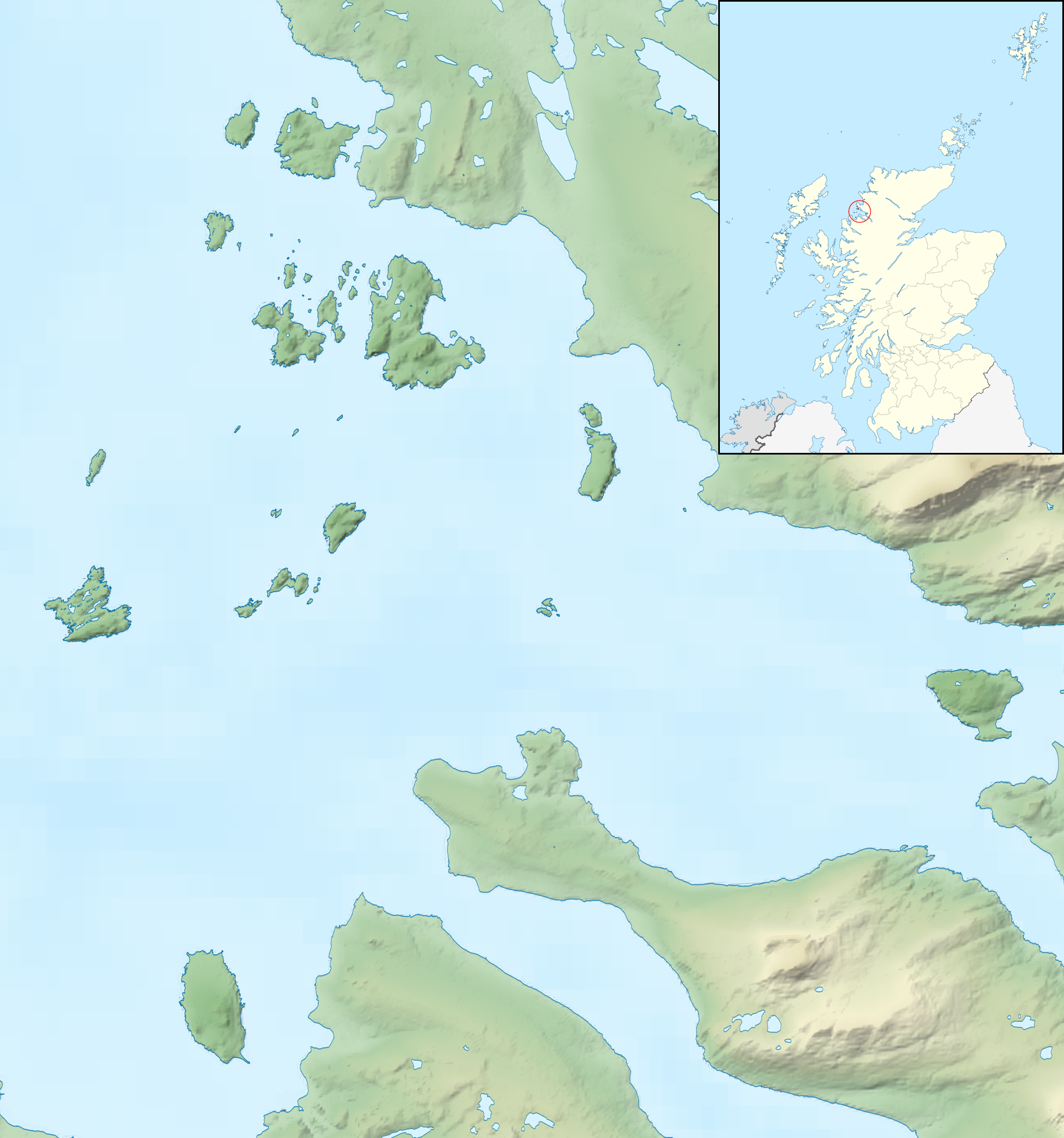
- Isle Ristol shown within Scotland Isle Ristol (Sutherland)
- OS grid reference: NB971112
- Coordinates: 58.044°N 05.437°W

Name
- Name meaning: 'island with the horse valley' from Gaelic and Norse.

Physical geography
- Island group: Summer Isles
- Area: 225 ha (7/8 sq mi)
- Area rank: 103
- Highest elevation: 71 m (233 ft)

Administration
- Council area: Highland
- Country: Scotland
- Sovereign state: United Kingdom

Demographics
- Population: 0

Isle Ristol, the innermost of the Summer Isles in Scotland, is a Scottish Wildlife Trust Reserve.

Lying roughly 12 miles (19 kilometres) north of Ullapool in Wester Ross, it is a tidal island, in Loch an Alltain Duibh, that is separated by a narrow channel from Old Dorney Bay. Access is by boat from Old Dornie.

Over fifty higher species have been identified amongst the flora on the Isle Ristol machair, amongst which are moonwort and adder's tongue.

Isle Ristol was a site of a British Fishery Society station in the late 18th century.

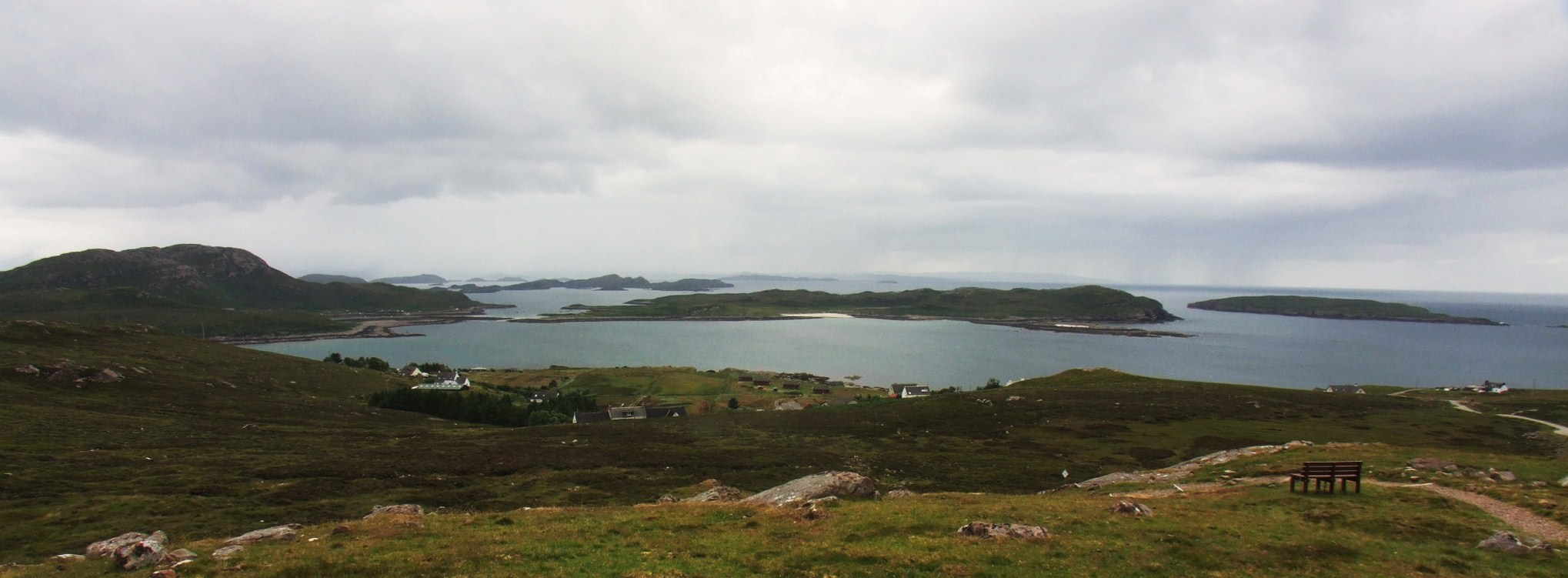
View south, over Altandhu, of Isle Ristol, in Loch an Alltain Duibh, with Eilean Mullagrach to the right
