= Egdon =

Hamlet in Worcestershire, England

Coordinates: 52.159°N 2.121°W

Egdon is a hamlet located in the county of Worcestershire and falls with the civil parish of Stoulton (to the south west) and White Ladies Aston (to the north east).

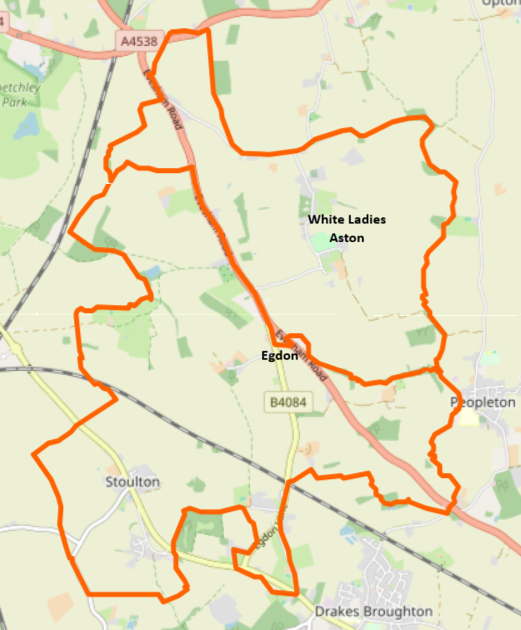
Boundary of White Ladies Aston and Stoulton with Egdon marked

The name, Egdon, is believed to be a place name derived from two Anglo-Saxon terms: eg and dun. Eg meaning "island of dry" or "raised land in a marsh or wetlands" and Dun meaning "hill". Thus Egdon can mean "hill on a ridge above a wetland area".

Today Egdon stands by the junction of the A44 and the B4084, Egdon Lane. Salt Street, currently the A44, was a major saltway from Martin Hussingtree to the Avon Valley that dates back to the Iron Age (500 B.C.- 43 A.D.). Later this route became the roman road running from Droitwich, through the Vale of Evesham, to Oxford.

== History ==
=== Anglo-Saxon ===
In Anglo-Saxon times the custom of describing boundaries in charters to form parish boundaries first appeared. The first mention of the Stoulton area occurred in 840, which may have included the west side of Egdon, was when Beorhtwulf of Mercia is said to have restored it to the Bishop of Worcester, Egdon was certainly in the possession of Bishop Oswald in 984.

During the 10th Century, Oswald, Bishop of Worcester reorganised the ancient land holding system. To strengthen the power of the newly constructed monasteries a triple hundred was created for Worcester Cathedral Priory at Oswaldslow with its hundred court on Low Hill located in Egdon. Low Hill House stands on this site today.

Egdon is referred to in a charter of 984 A.D. when describing the south west and southern boundary of the parish with White Ladies Aston

From Snaet's [Snaetch's] Spring above the Marsh along the Rommes Valley to the Salt Street, thence southward past Oswald's Low to the Salters' Well and along the dyke to the Saw Brook and along this brook to the Bow Brook and along the Bow Brook to the Wood Ford at Beornwynn's Valley.

The mentioned "Salters' Well" was at the Egdon fork for the convenience of packhorse trains carrying Droitwich Salt south.

=== Domesday Book (1086) ===
At the time of the Domesday Survey Egdon was part of the Oswaldslow hundred.

Egdon is included in the estate of the manor of Over Wolverton (Wulfringtune meaning Wulfhere’s estate or farm appearing as Vlfrintun). The record shows:

Of this manor Urso the Sheriff holds 3 outliers at 7 hides: Mucknell, Stoulton, Wolverton. 7 ploughs. 7 villagers, 7 smallholders and 7 slaves. Meadow, 16 acres. Revenue was paid from these three lands before 1066, because they were always for supplies. Value 100s.

=== Middle Ages ===
The overlordship of Over Wolverton passed from Urse to his descendants the Beauchamps, and was probably held by William de Beauchamp in demesne early in the 13th century. Later it was held under them by a family called Bruly or Brayly. At some point between 1280 and 1316 it passed to Walter de Bruly, who held it by service of keeping the Earl of Warwick's warren at Stoulton. He was succeeded by John de Bruly, who with Joan, his wife, settled it and passed it on to his son John and Alice, his wife, in 1336. There appears to be no later mention of it as a separate holding, but it evidently came into the possession of the Beauchamps, and was annexed to their manor of Stoulton.

=== 17th Century Legal Disputes ===
The hamlet was involved in legal disputes in the 17th century. In the spring of 1600, John Greaves, the Miller of, Windmill Hill, Egdon Lane, accused Richard Pratt, a White Ladies Aston resident of breaking into his windmill and taking away “an instrument very necessary to the said windmill called a levy”. Worcester Quarter Sessions Court heard that there had long been a history of bad blood between the two men.

Later, in the winter of 1633, White Ladies Aston villagers (of which some would have likely lived in Egdon) were again before the Worcester Quarter Sessions for the state of repair of the Saltway through their Parish. “It’s nothing but deep ruts and quagmires” complained the Chairman. “The whole length of the road is often impassable but nearby parishes keep it in better order than White Ladies” he added. (7)
