= Eling Park =

Park in Chongqing, China

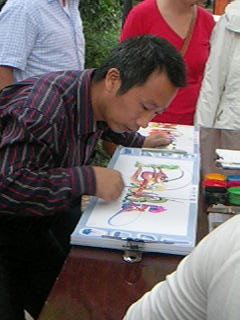
Artist in Eling Park.

Eling Park (Chinese: 鹅岭公园; lit. 'Goose Range Park or Goose Hill Park') is a park located on Changjiang Road in the Yuzhong District of Chongqing Municipality, People's Republic of China. Eling Park is also known as 'courteous park' (宜园 Yí Yuán) and is home to special plant species as well as a newly built tower, the Liangjiang Pavilion, which provides a view of the entire city.

Eling Park is one of the key state parks of China and is noted as a national protected area of China.

== History ==
Eling Park was built in 1909 and originally the home of Li Yaoting (李耀庭), a rich businessman at the end of Qing Dynasty (1644–1911). The park was originally called Edingling ("Goose Nape Hill") due to its narrow and steep shape that resembles the nape of a goose.

== Restoration ==
In 1958, a large-scale of restoration was carried out on the site of the Li Garden and the park became 'Eling Park'.
