= Elland Lower Edge =

Human settlement in the United Kingdom

Coordinates: 53.689°N 1.810°W

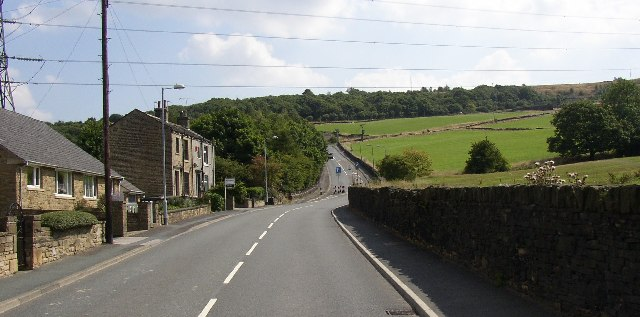
- Road from Elland to Wakefield climbing Lower Edge

- Location within West Yorkshire
- Metropolitan borough: Calderdale
- Metropolitan county: West Yorkshire
- Region: Yorkshire and the Humber
- Country: England
- Sovereign state: United Kingdom
- Police: West Yorkshire
- Fire: West Yorkshire
- Ambulance: Yorkshire

Elland Lower Edge is an area of Rastrick near the town of Brighouse, in the Calderdale district, in the English county of West Yorkshire.
