= Eilean Leathann =

Bridged island in the Outer Hebrides of Scotland

Eilean Leathann (Gaelic)
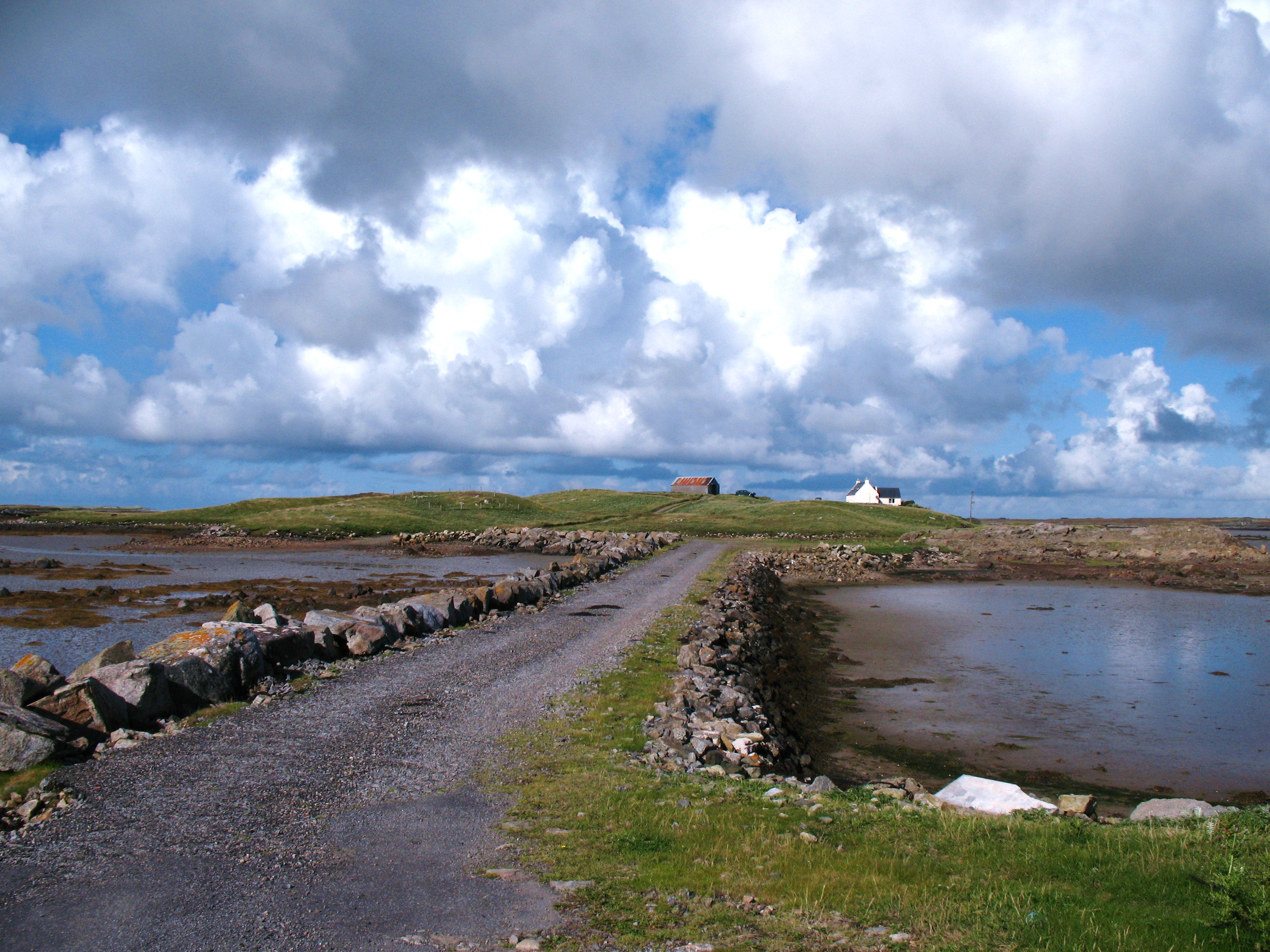
- The causeway to Eilean Leathann from Garbh-eilean

Location
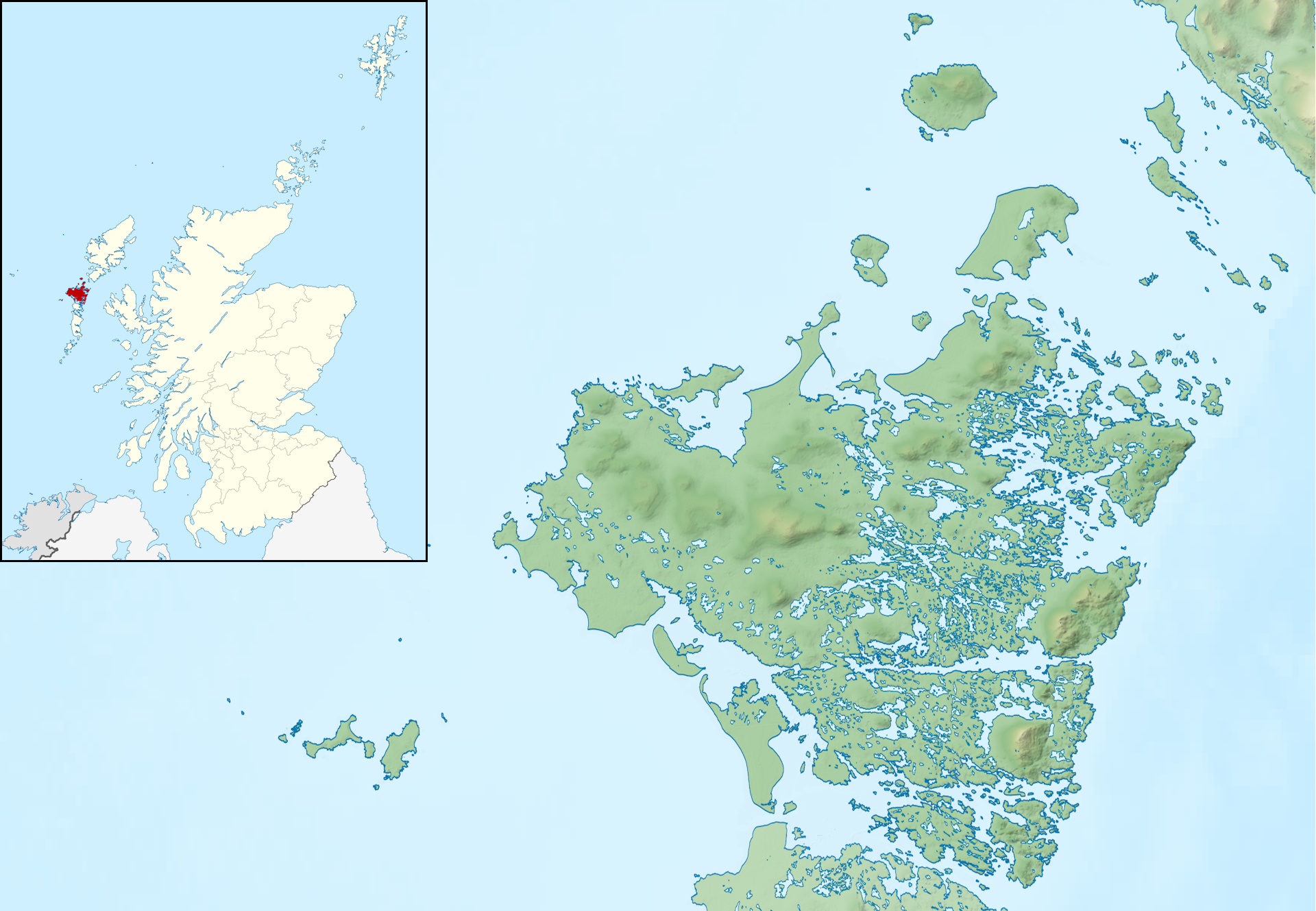
- Location within North Uist Location within Outer Hebrides
- OS grid reference: NF841587
- Coordinates: 57.508°N 7.275°W

Name
- Name meaning: Broad island

Physical geography
- Island group: Uists and Barra
- Area: 6.5 ha (0 sq mi)
- Highest elevation: 10 m (33 ft)

Administration
- Council area: Na h-Eileanan Siar
- Country: Scotland
- Sovereign state: United Kingdom

Demographics
- Population: 1
- Population rank: 95=
- Population density: 15.4/km^{2} (40/sq mi)

Eilean Leathann is an island that is connected to the nearby Garbh-eilean by a narrow road running over a short causeway that then joins the main North Ford Causeway or Oitir Mór between North Uist and Benbecula in the Outer Hebrides of Scotland. In 2022 the census recorded a permanent population on the island of a single individual.
