= Eilean Meadhonach =

Island in the Crowlin Islands, Scotland

Eilean Meadhonach (Gaelic)

Location
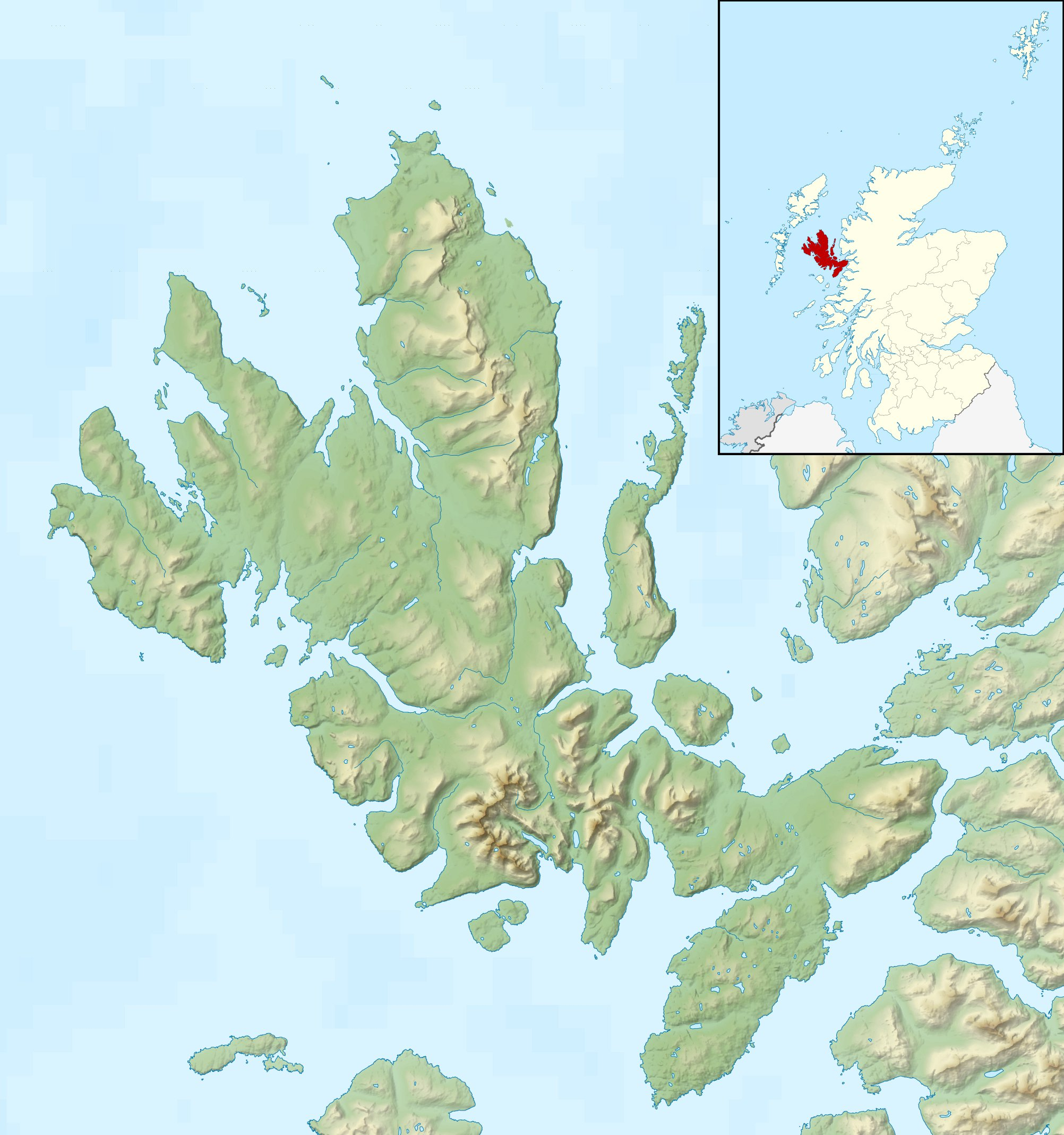
- Eilean Meadhonach shown relative to Skye
- OS grid reference: NG687348
- Coordinates: 57.345°N 05.845°W

Name
- Gaelic pronunciation: [ˈelan ˈmia.anəx]
- Name meaning: middle island

Physical geography
- Island group: Skye
- Area: 77 ha
- Area rank: 166=
- Highest elevation: 54 m

Administration
- Council area: Highland
- Country: Scotland
- Sovereign state: United Kingdom

Demographics
- Population: 0

Eilean Meadhonach is the second largest of the Crowlin Islands, located in the Inner Sound off the island of Skye, Scotland.

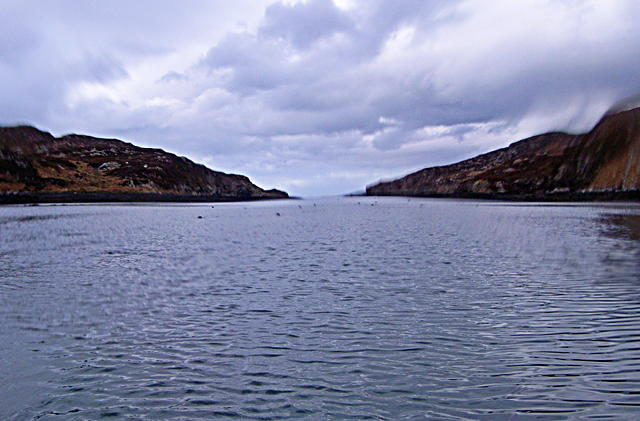
Crowlin Harbour

It is situated immediately to the west of Eilean Mòr, and to the north is Eilean Beag, both of which it is connected to at low tide. The total area is 77 hectares (190 acres) although Haswell-Smith also provides a figure of 50 hectares (120 acres) for the area. The larger figure may include Eilean Beag and the lower one Eilean Meadhonach alone at high tide.

Crowlin Harbour is at the northern end of the 50-metre-wide (160 ft) gap between Eilean Meadhonach and Eilean Mòr and provides a natural shelter from westerly and southerly winds. It is also possible to anchor in a small pool at the centre of this strait.

Excavations on Eilean Mòr have shown evidence of Mesolithic human settlement and there are the remains of a midden and rock shelter on the north west coast of Eilean Meadhonach. Eilean Mòr has ruined cottages from historic times although there is no evidence of permanent recent habitation on Eilean Meadhonach. Eilean Beag has a light beacon and the remains of an old shieling.
