= Horse Island, Summer Isles =

Island in the Summer Isles, Scotland

Horse Island
Eilean nan Each (Gaelic)

Location
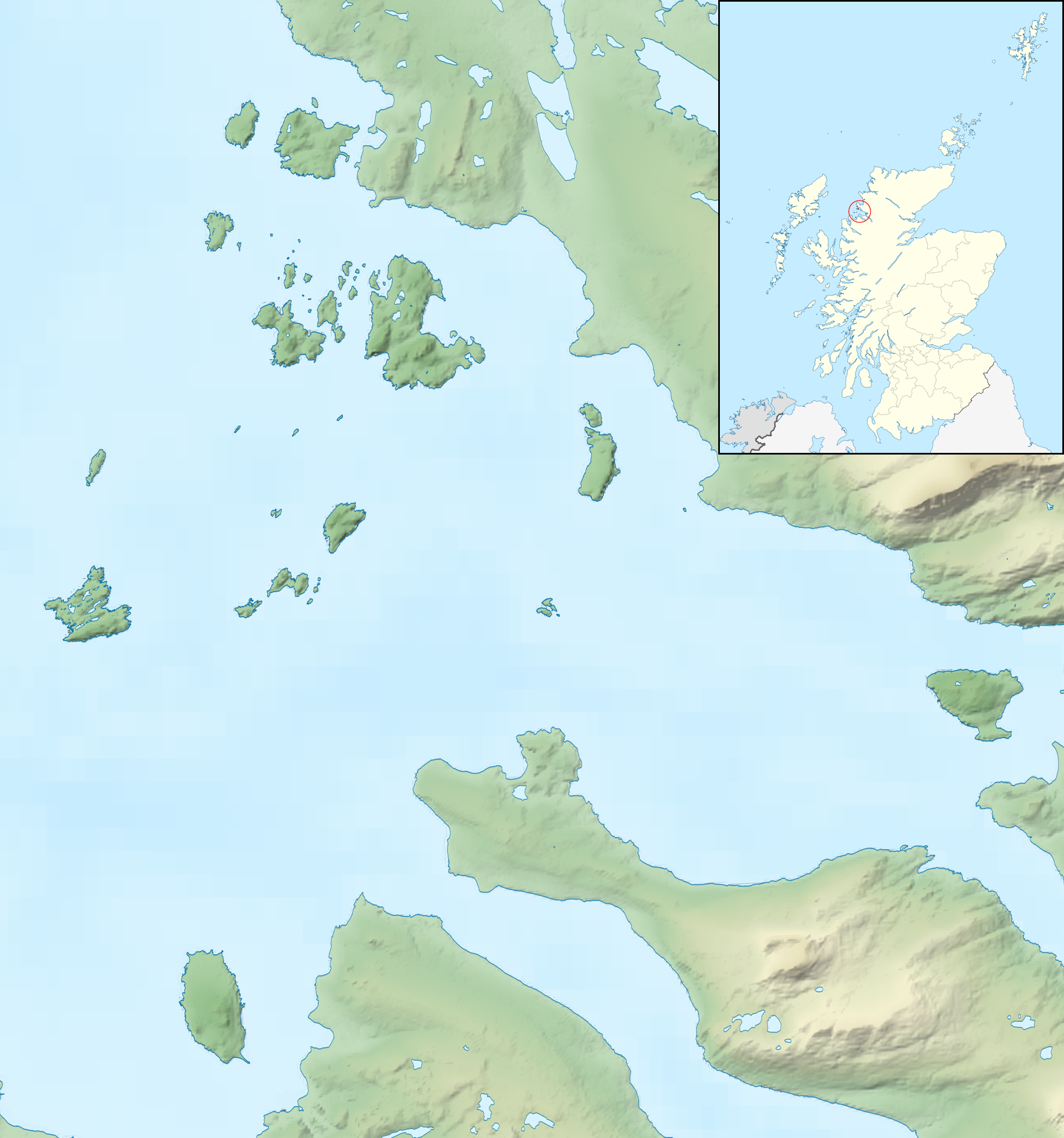
- Horse Island shown within the Summer Isles Horse Island shown within the Highlands
- OS grid reference: NC023045
- Coordinates: 57.99°N 5.34°W

Physical geography
- Island group: Summer Isles
- Area: 53 ha (3/16 sq mi)
- Area rank: 196=
- Highest elevation: Sgùrr nan Uan, 60 m (197 ft)

Administration
- Council area: Highland
- Country: Scotland
- Sovereign state: United Kingdom

Demographics
- Population: 0

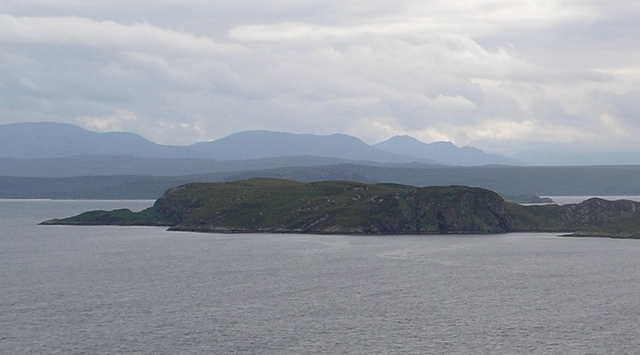
Horse Island from Badenscaillie

Horse Island (Scottish Gaelic: Eilean nan Each) is an uninhabited island in the Summer Isles, in the west of Scotland.

Once inhabited, the island now only supports a herd of wild goats. It rises to a maximum elevation of 60 metres (197 feet) at Sgùrr nan Uan ("peak of the lambs").
