= Eling, Berkshire =

Hamlet in Berkshire, England

Coordinates: 51.471136°N 1.247745°W

Eling
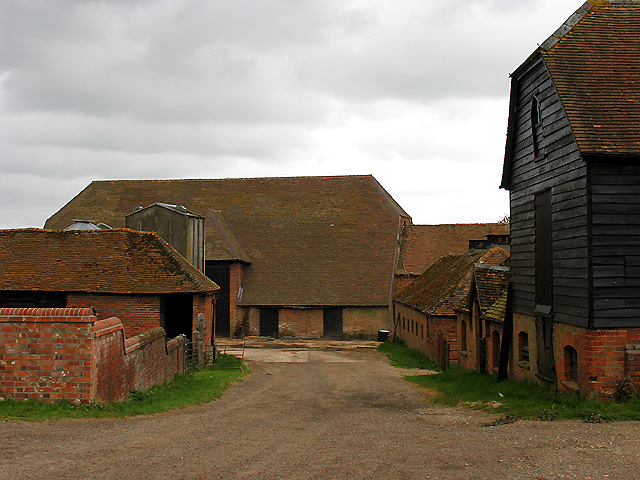
- Eling Farm

- Location within Berkshire
- OS grid reference: SU523750
- Metropolitan borough: West Berkshire
- Metropolitan county: Berkshire
- Region: South East
- Country: England
- Sovereign state: United Kingdom
- Post town: NEWBURY
- Postcode district: RG18
- Dialling code: 01635
- Police: Thames Valley
- Fire: Royal Berkshire
- Ambulance: South Central
- UK Parliament: Reading West and Mid Berkshire

Eling is a hamlet in the civil parish of Hampstead Norreys in the English county of Berkshire. The settlement lies next to the M4 motorway, and is located approximately 5 miles (8.0 km) north-east of Newbury. The Eling estate was owned by Gerald Palmer and is now administered by a charitable trust. The nearby hamlet of Eling Hermitage is on Everington Lane.
