= List of freshwater islands in Scotland =

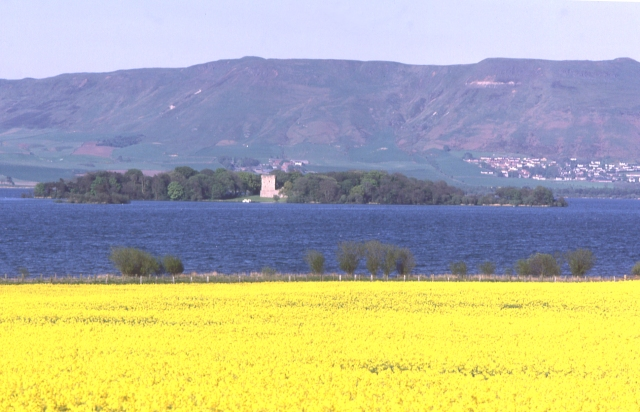
Loch Leven Castle island, where Mary, Queen of Scots, was imprisoned in 1567.

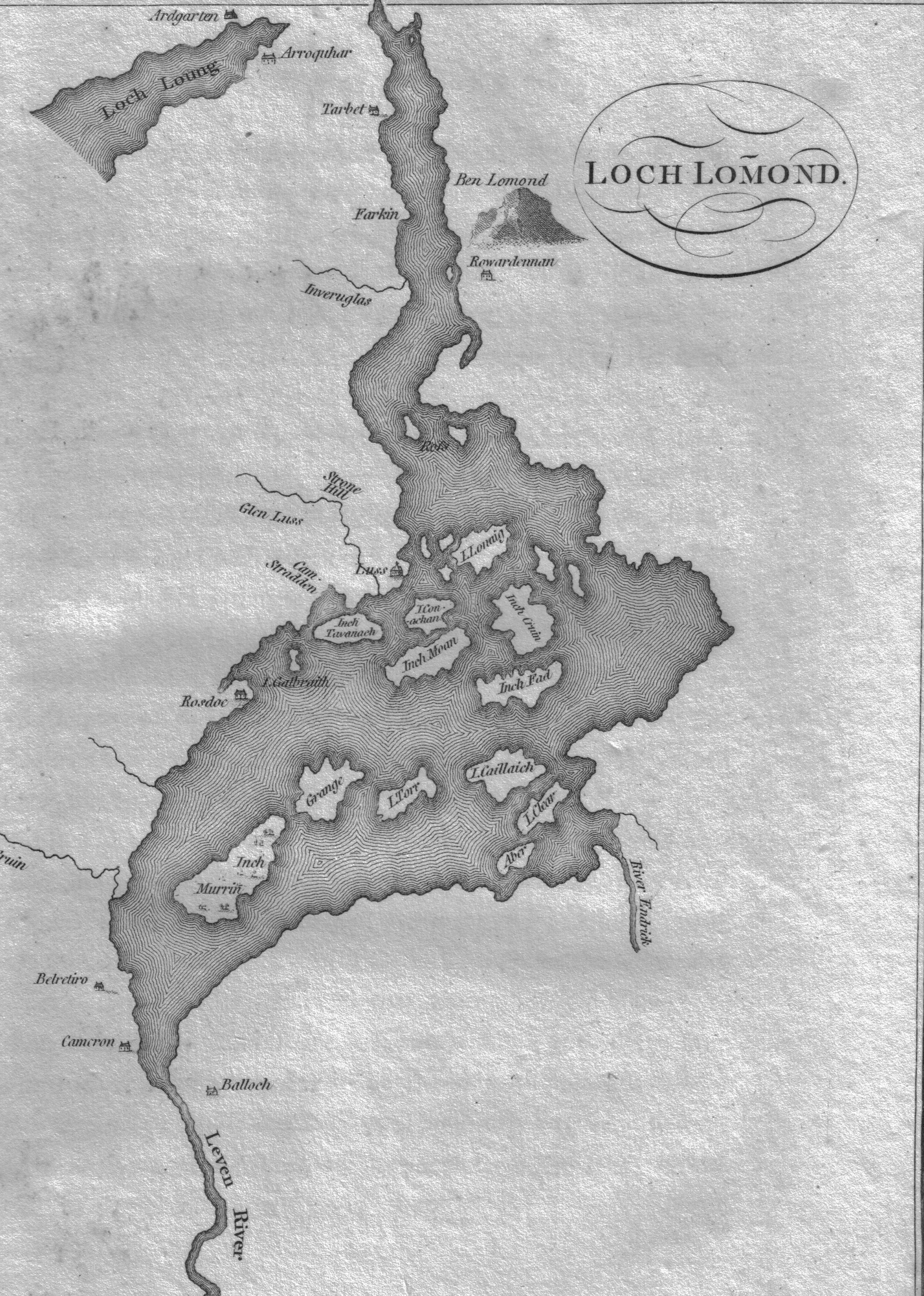
A map of the 1800s showing the islands of Loch Lomond

The freshwater islands in Scotland include those within freshwater lochs and rivers – including tidal areas, so the islands may not always be surrounded by freshwater. It has been estimated that there are at least 31,460 freshwater lochs in Scotland and that 1.9 per cent of the land surface is covered by freshwater. The distribution has a north-west to south-east gradient, with the highest concentrations occurring on the islands of the Outer Hebrides. (Note: "Loch" is a Scottish Gaelic word for both a lake and a fiord that has been borrowed by Scots and Scottish English to apply to such bodies of water. The Lake of Menteith is the only natural body of water called a "lake" in Scotland.)

The more notable freshwater islands include Lochindorb Castle Island, Loch Leven Castle Island, St Serf's Inch and Inchmahome, each of which have had a role to play in Scottish history. Inchmurrin, the largest freshwater island in the British Isles, is in Loch Lomond, which contains thirty or more other islands. (Note: Some of the islets in Loch Lomond may only appear when the water levels are low and although many sources provide a figure of up to sixty islands this may derive from a poetic 9th century description. Other sources suggest a total of 30 or 38 islands.)

Various names are used repeatedly. "Inch" or Innis is a Scots word that can mean 'island' (although it is also used for terra firma surrounded by marsh). Similarly, Eilean is the Gaelic for 'island'. A common suffix for offshore islands in the north of Scotland is "-holm", derived from the Old Norse holmr, meaning a 'small and rounded islet'. This list excludes artificial crannógs and the numerous small freshwater islands with no recorded name. (Note: Crannógs are excluded as they are both artificial and very numerous. There are at least 600 of these small prehistoric structures in Scotland.) (Note: There is a significant difference between the Ordnance Survey (OS) treatment of freshwater and offshore islands. See for example Loch Snigiscleit at grid reference NF802254. If the islands here were offshore it is virtually certain that there would be three substantial named islands and probably half a dozen named smaller ones. There are several examples – Loch Druidibeag has two named islands and about a dozen un-named. It is not clear whether this because the OS only chose to list a few larger ones and those identified by RCAHMS, or if for some reason local people did not give names to smaller islands in lochs.)

== Larger islands ==
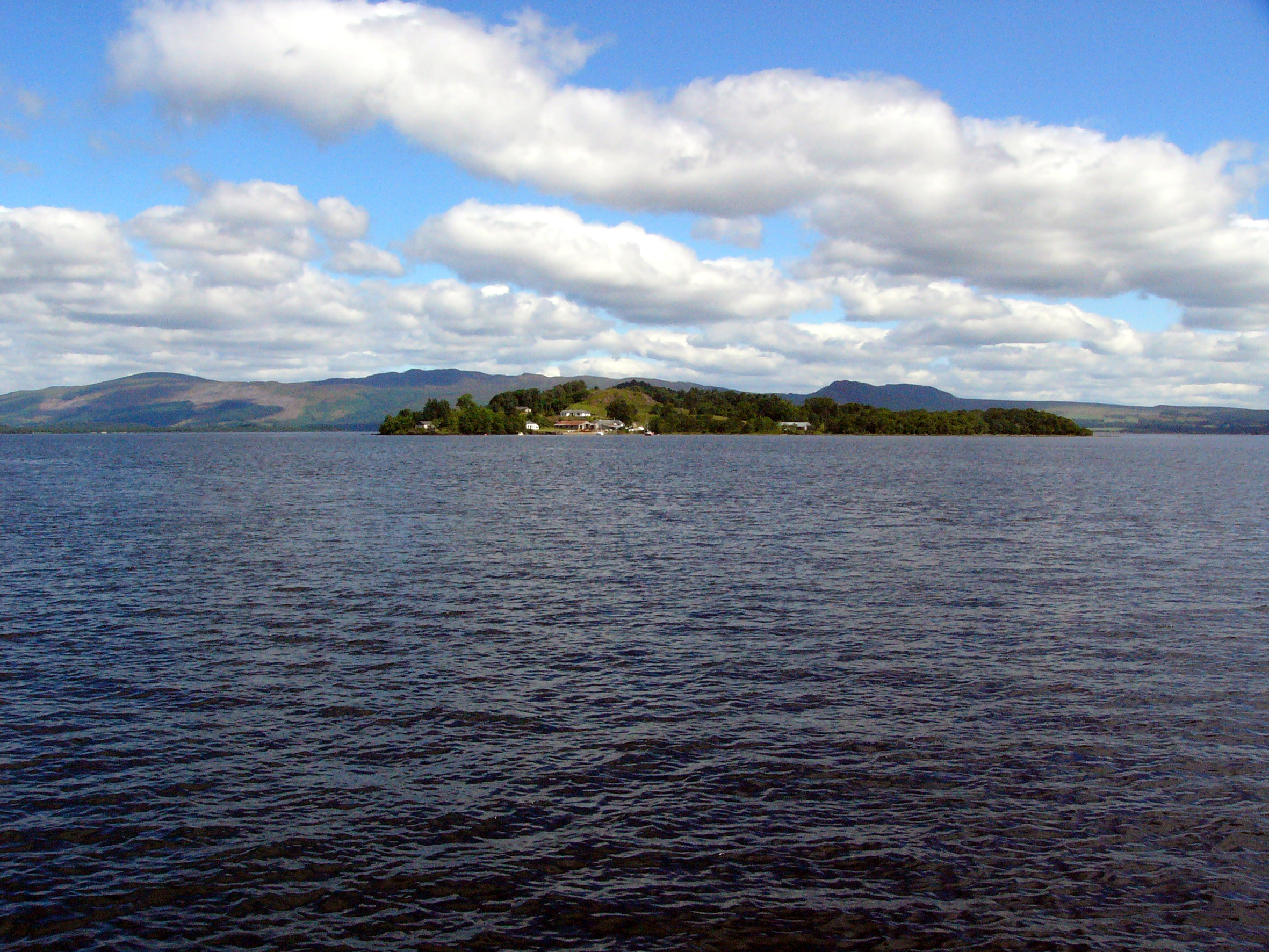
Inchmurrin in Loch Lomond, Scotland's largest freshwater island

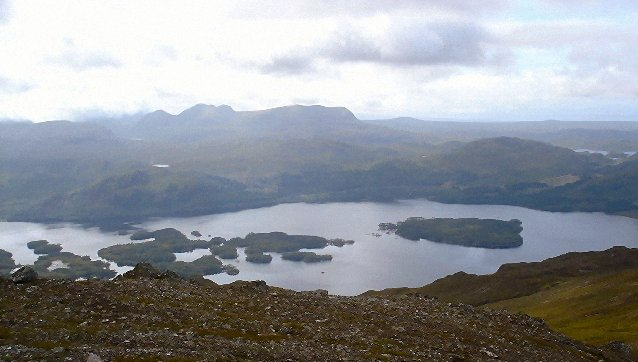
The islands of Loch Maree

This table includes all of the freshwater islands that exceed 35 hectares (86 acres) in size and/or are populated.

Island	Location	Area	Population
Dunglass Island	River Conon	40 ha (99 acres)	0
Eilean Mòr	Loch Langavat	59 ha (150 acres)	0
Eilean Ruairidh Mòr	Loch Maree	38 ha (94 acres)	0
Eilean Sùbhainn	Loch Maree	118 ha (290 acres)	0
Garbh Eilean	Loch Maree	39 ha (96 acres)	0
Inchcailloch	Loch Lomond	50 ha (120 acres)	0
Inchconnachan	Loch Lomond	35 ha (86 acres)	0
Inchfad	Loch Lomond	35 ha (86 acres)	1
Inchlonaig	Loch Lomond	80 ha (200 acres)	0
Inchmurrin	Loch Lomond	120 ha (300 acres)	10
Inchtavannach	Loch Lomond	70 ha (170 acres)	3
Innis Chonan	Loch Awe	8 ha (20 acres)	2
Moncreiffe Island	River Tay	46 ha (110 acres)	1
St Serf's Inch	Loch Leven	31 ha (77 acres)	0

Inchlonaig and Inchcruin (Note: Referred to by the National Records of Scotland (2013) as "Inchruin", which is a typographical error.) are classified by the National Records of Scotland as "inhabited islands but had no usual residents at the time of either the 2001 or 2011 censuses." It is likely that Eilean Aigas and Contin Island are inhabited, at least from time to time as well, although they were not listed as such by the Census in 2001 or 2011.

== In mainland lochs ==
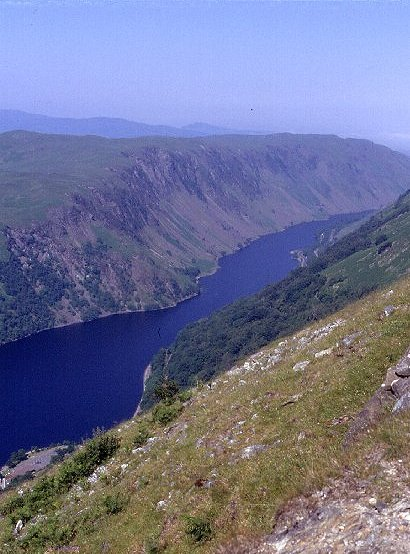
Loch Awe

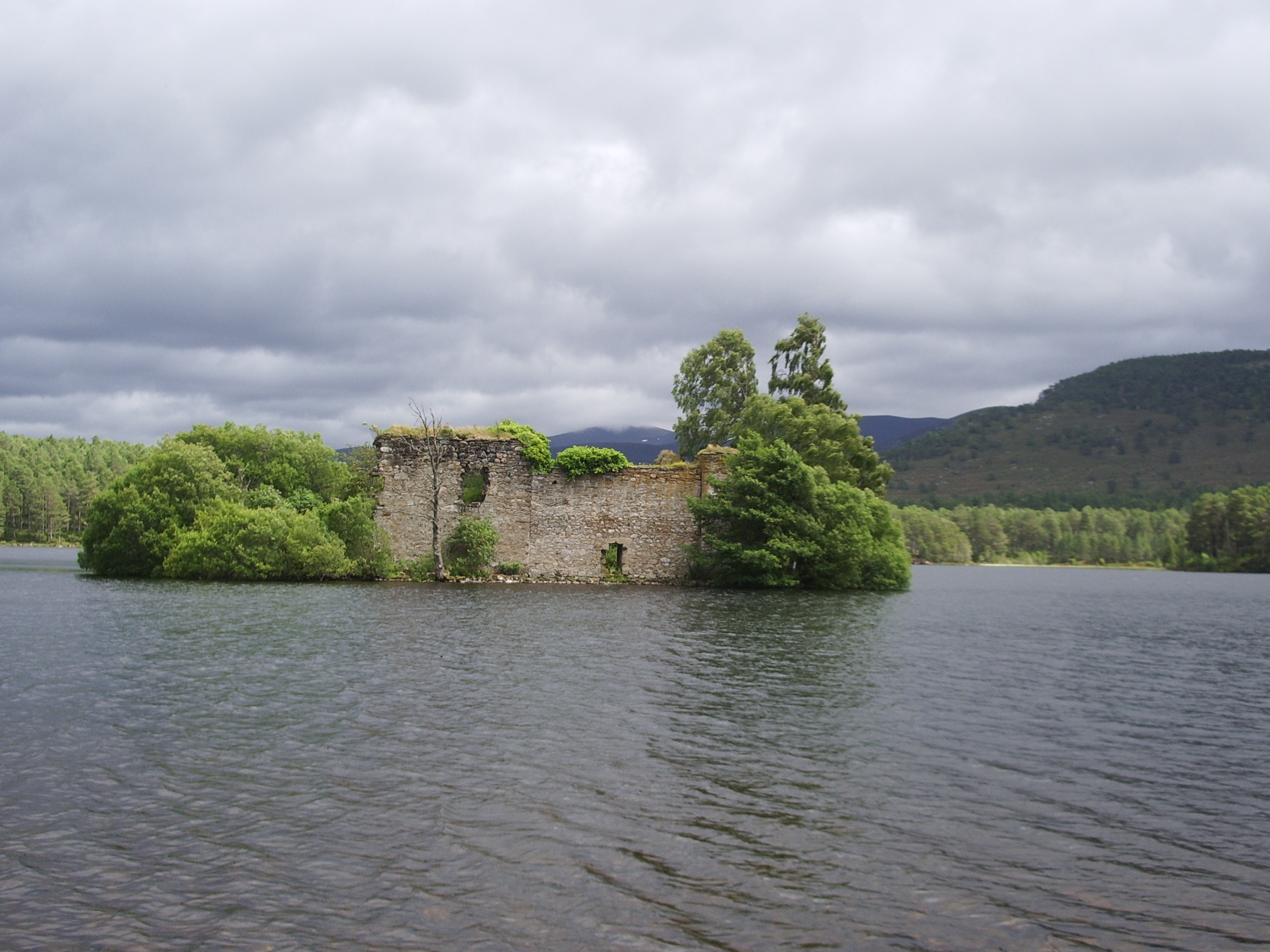
The ruins of Loch an Eilein castle with Cairn Gorm beyond

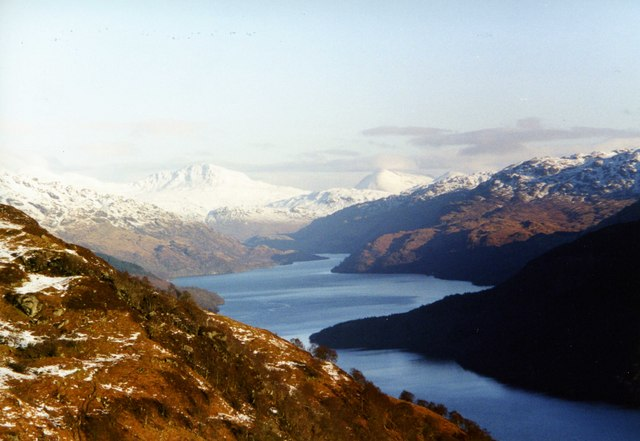
The upper reaches of Loch Lomond in winter

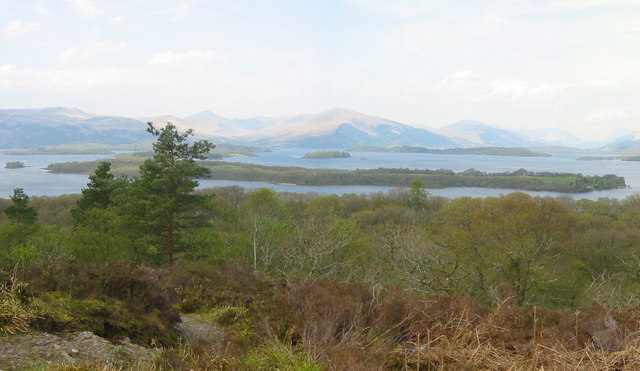
Inchfad in Loch Lomond

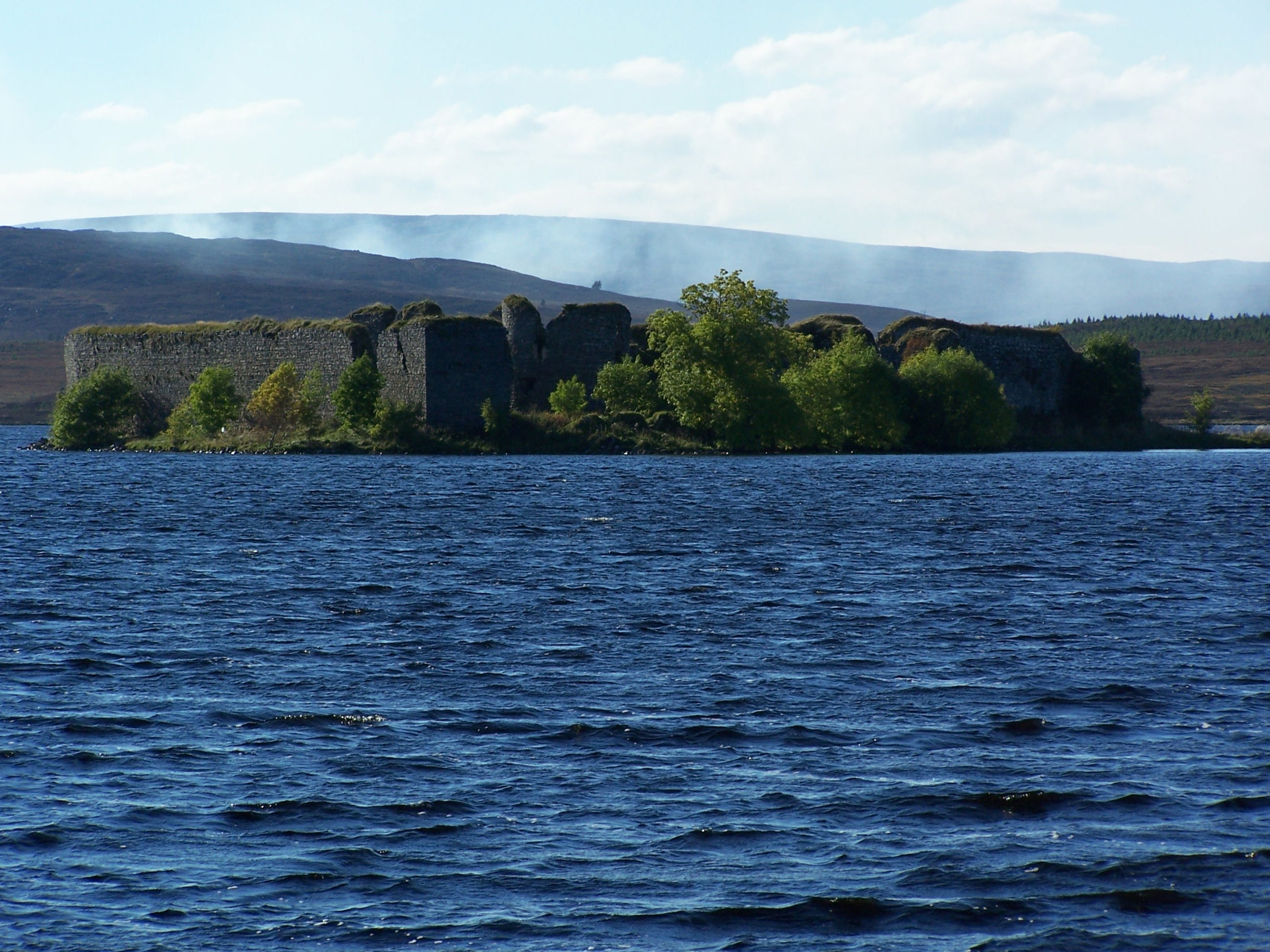
Lochindorb Castle Island

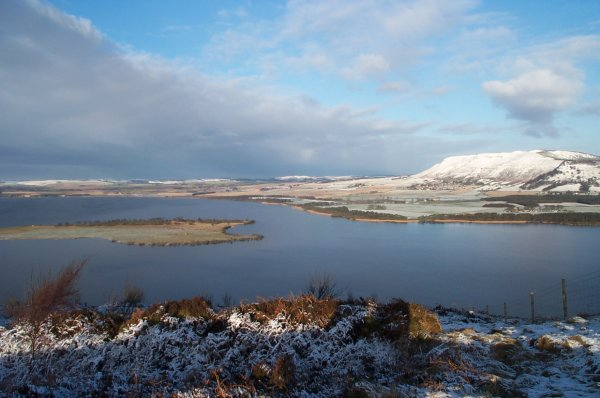
St Serf's Inch and Loch Leven in winter, from Vane Farm on Benarty Hill

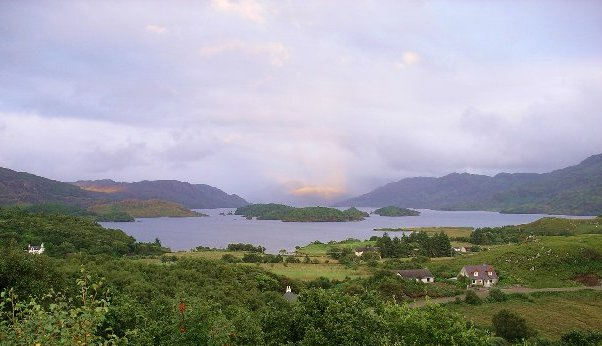
Islands in Loch Morar

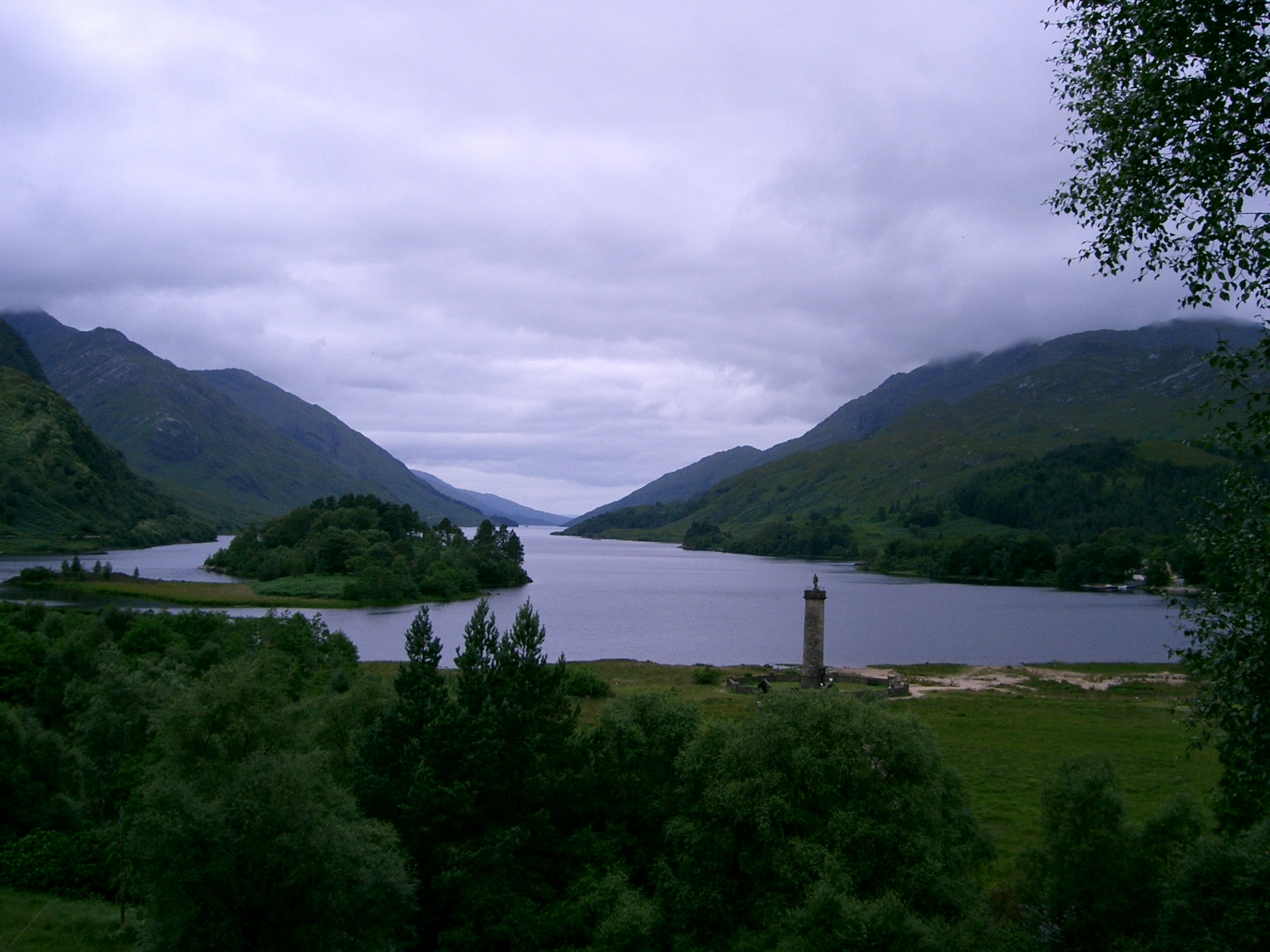
The east end of Loch Shiel: the Glenfinnan monument and Eilean Ghleann Fhionainn

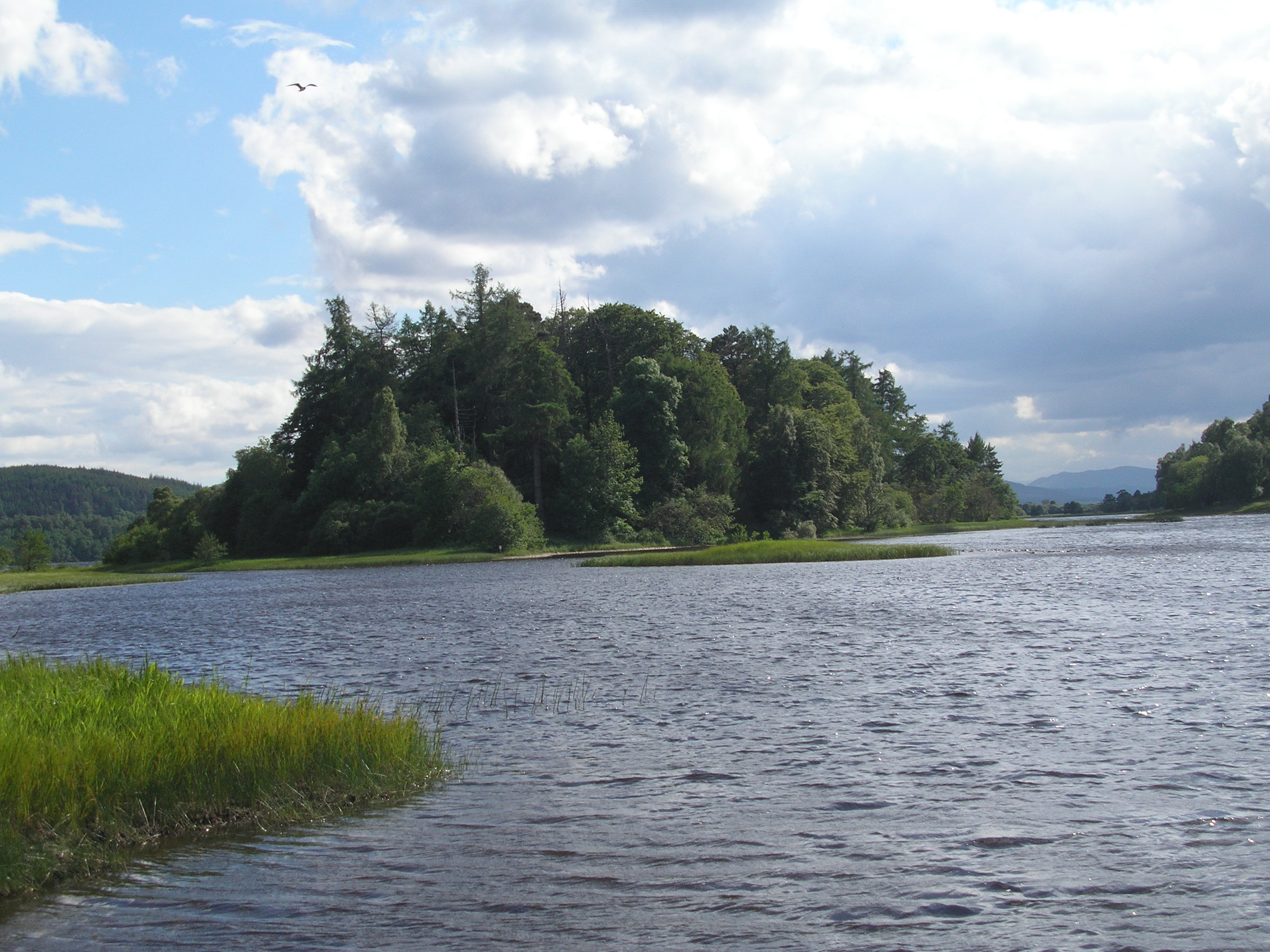
Tom Dubh in Loch Insh

Loch Awe is Scotland's longest loch and abounds with islands and crannógs. Several of the islands are, or have in the past, been inhabited; there are two castles and the remains of a chapel on the islands. Inistrynich, Eilean na Maodail, Eilean Dubh and Liever Island are all promontories as opposed to islands despite their names. The loch's water levels have fluctuated so some of them may have been islands in recent history, as the promontory on which Kilchurn Castle stands once was.

There may be up to sixty islands in the Loch Lomond including Inchmurrin, the largest freshwater island anywhere in the Britain and Ireland, and Inchconnachan, which has hosted a small population of Red-necked Wallaby since at least 1975. The isolated strongholds of Lochindorb Castle and Loch an Eilein Castle were once in the hands of the 14th century nobleman Alexander Stewart, the infamous "Wolf of Badenoch". There are numerous unnamed small islands in mainland lochs, including those where the water level has been artificially raised by the creation of dams for the production of hydro-electricity. This process has created new islands that would previously have been small eminences.

Local authority (Note: As there are numerous lochs in Highland, which is large council area covering over 30,000 square kilometres (12,000 mi^{2}) the area committee designations of Badenoch and Strathspey, Caithness, Inverness, Lochaber, Nairn, Ross and Cromarty, Skye and Lochalsh and Sutherland are used to identify the location.)	Loch	OS Grid reference	Islands (Note: Numbers in brackets indicate that there are (2) or (3) islands of the same name in the body of water referred to.)
Aberdeenshire	Loch of Strathbeg	NK067591	Red Rock
Argyll and Bute	Loch Avich	NM928138	Eilean Fraoch, Innis Luana
Argyll and Bute	Loch Awe	NN108253	Badan Tomain, Black Islands, Eilean Beith, Eilean a' Chòmhraidh, Eilean a' Chrochaidh, Eilean an t-Sagairt (2), Eilean an t-Slinne, Eilean nam Meann, Eilean Seileachan, Fraoch Eilean, Innis Chonan, Innis Chonnel, Innis Errich, Innis Sèa-ràmhach, Innis Stiùire, Inishail
Argyll and Bute	Loch Bà	NN317505	Eilean Molach
Argyll and Bute/Stirling/West Dunbartonshire	Loch Lomond	NS380911	Aber Isle, Bucinch, Ceardach, Clairinsh, Creagan Dubha, Creinch, Eilean Deargannan, Eilean na h-Aon Chraoibhe, Ellanderroch, Fraoch Eilean, Inchcailloch, Inchconnachan, Inchcruin, Inchfad, Inchgalbraith, Inchlonaig, Inchmoan, Inchmurrin, Inchtavannach, Inveruglas Isle, Island I Vow, Keppinch, Stot Isle, Ross Isles, Tarbet Isle, Torrinch, Wallace's Isle
Ayrshire	Bogton Loch	NS470055	Elizabeth Isle
Ayrshire	Loch Doon	NX487944	Castle Isle
Ayrshire	Loch Finlas	NX466976	McDowalls Island
Ayrshire	Loch Macaterick	NX440915	Blaeberry Isle, Deer Isle, Eagles Isle
Badenoch and Strathspey	Loch an Eilein	NH900080	Loch an Eilein Castle
Badenoch and Strathspey	Loch Insh	NH833052	Tom Dubh
Dumfries and Galloway	Black Loch or Loch Crindil	NX114611	Heron Isle
Dumfries and Galloway	Carlingwark Loch	NX763613	Fir Island, Ash Island
Dumfries and Galloway	Fell Loch	NX309551	Fern Island
Dumfries and Galloway	Loch Kindar	NX970642	Kirk Kindar Island
Dumfries and Galloway	Loch Ken	NX729652	Burned Island, Corselands, Danevale Island, Green Island, Kenmure Holms, Parton Island, Parton Ward
Dumfries and Galloway	Loch Moan	NX350857	Black Island, White Island
Dumfries and Galloway	Loch Trool	NX415800	Maiden Isle, Ringielawn or the Soldiers' Holm
Dumfries and Galloway	Loch Urr	NX758847	Rough Island
Dumfries and Galloway	Mochrum Loch	NX297526	Gargrie Island, Kid Islands, Long Island, Round Island, Rowan Island, Scar Island, Scart Islands, Underwood
Dumfries and Galloway	White Loch or Loch of Inch	NX106610	Inch Crindil
Inverness	Loch a' Mhuillidh	NH276381	Eilean a' Mhuillidha
Inverness	Loch Laggan	NN484865	Eilean an Righ
Inverness	Loch Moy	NH774345	Eilean nan Clach, Isle of Moy
Lochaber	Loch Arkaig	NN161888	An t-Eilean Beag, Eilean a' Ghiubhais, Eilean Loch Airceig
Lochaber	Loch Bà	NN322504	Eilean Molach, Eilean na h-Iolaire
Lochaber	Loch Eilt	NM807821	Eilean an Tighe, Eilean Gaineamhach, Eilean Mòr, Eilean na Moine, Eilean nan Corra-ghriodhach
Lochaber	Loch Morar	NM700917	An t-Eilean Meadhoin, Brinacory Island, Eilean Allmha, Eilean a' Phidhir, Eilean Bàn, Eilean Ghibbi, Eilean nam Breac, Eilean nan Reithean
Lochaber	Loch Quoich	NH058011	Rubha Dubh nam Fiad
Lochaber	Loch Shiel	NM904803	Eilean Comlach, Eilean Drollaman, Eilean Dubh, Eilean Fhianain, Eilean Ghleann Fhionainn, Eilean Mhic Dhomhnuill Dhuibh, Seilag
Moray	Lochindorb	NH974361	Lochindorb Castle island
Perth and Kinross	Loch Earn	NN690242	Neish Island
Perth and Kinross	Loch Leven	NO144013	Loch Leven Castle Island, St Serf's Inch
Perth and Kinross	Loch of Clunie	NO115444	Clunie Castle Island
Perth and Kinross	Loch Tay	NN766452	Isle of Spar
Perth and Kinross	Loch Tummel	NN852595	An Dùn
Perth and Kinross/Lochaber	Loch Laidon	NN378542	Eilean Iubhair
Ross and Cromarty	Fionn Loch	NG945803	Eilean a' Garbh Uilt, Eilean an Eich Bhàin, Eilean Fraoich, Eilean nan Corrichean
Ross and Cromarty	Loch Maree	NG914730	Eilean Camas a' Chonnaidh, Eilean nan Clachairean, Eilean a' Chlamhain, Eilean na Craoibhe, Eilean na Creige Giubhas, Eilean Dubh na Sròine, Eilean Eachainn, Eilean Ghrùididh, Eilean Loisgte, Eilean Mhic a' Fhùlaraich, Eilean Ruairidh Beag, Eilean Ruairidh Mòr, Eilean Sùbhainn, Garbh Eilean, Isle Maree
Ross and Cromarty	Loch Monar	NH190408	Creag Ghrada
Ross and Cromarty	Loch Sionasgaig	NC114143	Eilean Dubh (3), Eilean Mòr, Sgeirean Dubha
Ross and Cromarty	Loch Ussie	NH503571	Eilean Beag, Eilean Mòr
Stirling	Loch Ard	NN468017	Briedach, Dundochill, Eilean Gorm
Stirling	Loch Dochart	NN404257	Loch Dochart Castle Island
Stirling	Loch Katrine	NN488079	Black Island, Eilean Bàn, Eilean Dharag, Eilean Molach, Lady's Isle, Otter Island
Stirling	Lake of Menteith	NN574005	Dog Isle, Inchmahome, Inch Talla
Sutherland	Loch Assynt	NC193257	Eilean an Sgudain, Eilean Assynt, Eilean Dubh
Sutherland	Loch Loyal	NC626463	Eilean Mòr, Eilean na Gaire, Eilean nan Crodh, Eilean Fraoich
Sutherland	Loch nan Clàr	NC767349	Eilean nam Meann, Rubha Mòr

== On offshore islands ==
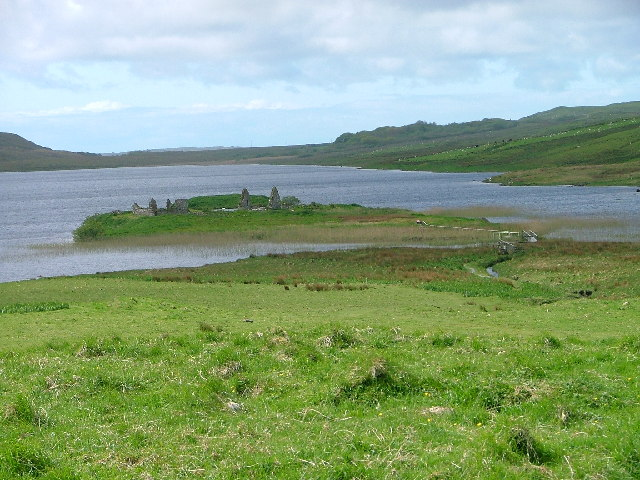
Ruins on Eilean Mòr (in the foreground) and Eilean na Comhairle, Loch Finlaggan, Islay

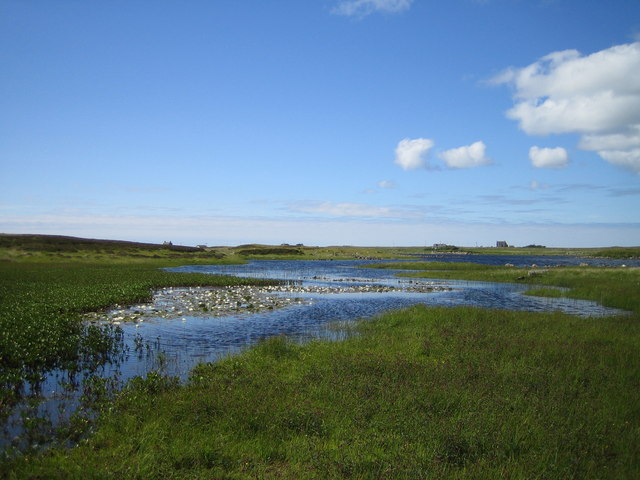
Loch Olabhat (south) on Benbecula

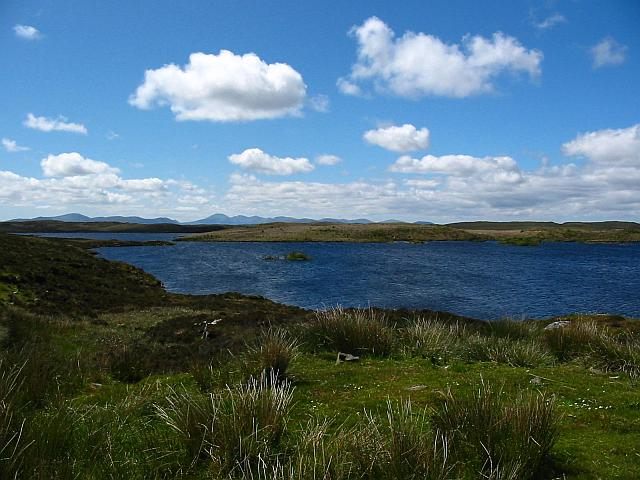
Loch Orasaigh and Rainish Eilean Mòr with the hills of Harris beyond

Although there are many crannógs in the lochs of the Inner Hebrides there are relatively few substantive, naturally occurring islands and of those that exist many are unnamed. (Note: In a few cases the presence of islands provides a loch with its name such as Loch an Eilein on Mull or Loch nan Eilean on Jura.) By contrast there are innumerable small islands in the estimated 7,500 lochs of the Eilean Siar, only a small proportion of which are named by the Ordnance Survey.

The Orkney and Shetland archipelagos to the north are similarly lacking in freshwater islands. Law Ting Holm, now attached to Mainland Shetland, was the location of the national þing, or Norse parliament of Shetland.

Archipelago	Island	Loch	OS Grid reference	Islands
Inner Hebrides	Loch Finlaggan	NR386673	Eilean Mòr, Eilean na Comhairle (Note: Eilean Mhuireill at the south end of the loch (grid reference NR386673) is identified by the Ordnance Survey as a crannog.)	
Inner Hebrides	Islay	Loch Gorm	NR227656	Eilean Mòr, Eilean nan Uan
Inner Hebrides	Mull	Loch Frisa	NM480493	Eilean Bàn, Eilean Dubh
Outer Hebrides	Benbecula	Loch Dùn Mhurchaidh	NF794546	Dùn Buidhe, Eilean Dubh
Outer Hebrides	Benbecula	Loch Eilean Iain	NF786533	Eilean Iain
Outer Hebrides	Benbecula	Loch Langabhat	NF827490	Eilean Ghillechriosda
Outer Hebrides	Benbecula	Loch Olabhat	NF812419	Eilean Fiadhaich
Outer Hebrides	Benbecula	Loch Olabhat	NF796514	Dùn Aonias, Dùn Ruadh
Outer Hebrides	Great Bernera	Loch Barabhat	NB157355	Dùn Barabhat (Note: Dun Baravat has an Iron Age roundhouse dated from between 300 and 300 BC.)
Outer Hebrides	Lewis	Loch Airigh Seibh	NB259388	Eileanan Dubh
Outer Hebrides	Lewis	Loch Fada Gobha	NB245232	Eilean Cro Balair
Outer Hebrides	Lewis	Loch Lagasbhat Àrd	NB243378	Eilean Ard, Eilean na Cachlaidh
Outer Hebrides	Lewis	Loch Lagasbhat Ìarach	NB229388	Eilean Cleit Surraidh, Eilean Choinoich
Outer Hebrides	Lewis	Loch Langavat	NB197205	Eilean a' Faof, Eilean Mhic Fail, Eilean Mòr, Tearead, Tearead Thioram, Tearead Fhliuch
Outer Hebrides	Lewis	Loch Mòr Bharabhais	NB345496	Eilean Àird Fhianuis
Outer Hebrides	Lewis	Loch Morsgail	NB138220	Eilean an Tighe
Outer Hebrides	Lewis	Loch Orasaigh	NB386279	Rainish Eilean Mòr (Note: Rainish Eilean Mòr at grid reference NB388281 is about 27 hectares (67 acres) in extent. This makes it one of the larger freshwater islands, but it is probably the largest relative to the size of the body of water it sits in, Loch Orasaigh being only about 125 hectares (310 acres) all told.)
Outer Hebrides	Lewis	Loch Trealalabhal	NB274236	Eilean nan Cnàmh, (Note: Eilean nan Cnàmh is in Loch nam Faoileag, an arm of Loch Trealalabhal separated from the main body by a causeway. The former loch is "commonly regarded" as part of the latter.) Eilean nan Uan, Eilean Mòr Loch Trealaval, Eilean Dubh Mhic Leoid
Outer Hebrides	North Uist	Loch an Eilean	NF747759	Dùn a' Ghaillain
Outer Hebrides	North Uist	Loch an t-Sruith Mhòir	NF902695	Eilean Glas Mòr, Eilean na Caora Glaise, Eilean nam Faoileag
Outer Hebrides	North Uist	Loch Aonghais	NF855738	Dùn Aonghais
Outer Hebrides	North Uist	Loch Carabhat	NF848611	Dùn Bàn, Eilean Dubh, Eilean Glas
Outer Hebrides	North Uist	Loch Dùn an t-Siamain	NF885593	Dùn an t-Siamain
Outer Hebrides	North Uist	Loch Eubhal	NF726711	Dùn Mhic Raouill
Outer Hebrides	North Uist	Loch Fhada	NF871712	Adam Fraoich, Eilean Dubh Mòr, Eilean Mossam
Outer Hebrides	North Uist	Loch Hundair	NF905657	Dùn Bàn
Outer Hebrides	North Uist	Loch nan Eun	NF843674	Eilean Buidhe
Outer Hebrides	North Uist	Loch nan Garbh Chlachan	NF860599	Dùn Bàn
Outer Hebrides	North Uist	Loch nan Geireann	NF845727	Aird Reamhar, Eilean Glas
Outer Hebrides	North Uist	Loch nan Strùban	NF807646	Eilean Achotain
Outer Hebrides	North Uist	Loch Obasaraigh	NF894613	Eilean Fada, Eilean Leathann, Eilean Mòr
Outer Hebrides	North Uist	Loch Olabhat	NF749753	Eilean Dòmhnuill
Outer Hebrides	North Uist	Loch Sgadabhagh	NF854683	Eilean Dubh Mòr
Outer Hebrides	North Uist	Loch Sgealtair	NF893683	Dùn Eilean Buidhe
Outer Hebrides	South Uist	Loch an Dùin Mhor	NF775414	Dùn Mòr
Outer Hebrides	South Uist	Loch an Eilein	NF762371	Eilean Bheagram
Outer Hebrides	South Uist	Loch Bì	NF773438	Brostam More, Brostam Beg, Chiasmul, Eilean a Charnan, Eilean Dubh an Tairbeirt, Limalum More
Outer Hebrides	South Uist	Loch Druidibeag	NF777460	Dùn Buidhe, Dùn Ragbhail, Eilean an Rana
Outer Hebrides	South Uist	Loch Dùn na Buail'-uachdraich	NF777460	Dùn na Buail'-uachdraich
Outer Hebrides	South Uist	Loch Dùn na Cille	NF748185	Dùn na Killie, Eilean Buidhe, Eilean Fraoich
Outer Hebrides	South Uist	Unnamed lochan (Note: This loch is not named by the Ordnance Survey and at one time it may have been an extension of the saltwater Loch Boisdale. Its size has been enhanced artificially in that a small dam has been constructed, that prevents brackish water entering from Poll a' Fearchadh.)	NF758200	Eilean nan Rámh
Orkney	Mainland	Loch of Harray	HY291160	Holm of Kirkness, Ling Holm, Ling Holms, Long Holm, Sand Holm
Orkney	Mainland	Loch of Swannay	HY312279	Muckle Holm
Orkney	Rousay	Loch of Wasbister	HY397333	The Burrian
Shetland	Mainland	Loch of Tingwall	HU416427	Holme of Setter
Shetland	Unst	Loch of Watlee	HP594055	Little Holm

== In rivers ==
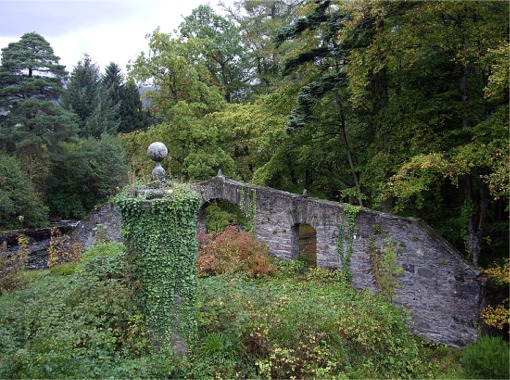
The MacNab burial ground on Inchbuie

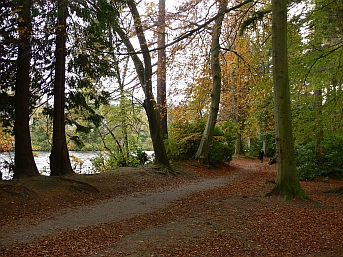
Woods on the Ness Islands

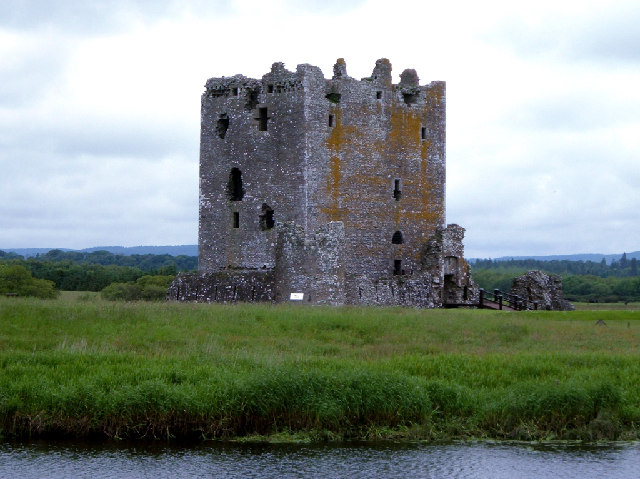
Threave Castle on Threave Island in the River Dee

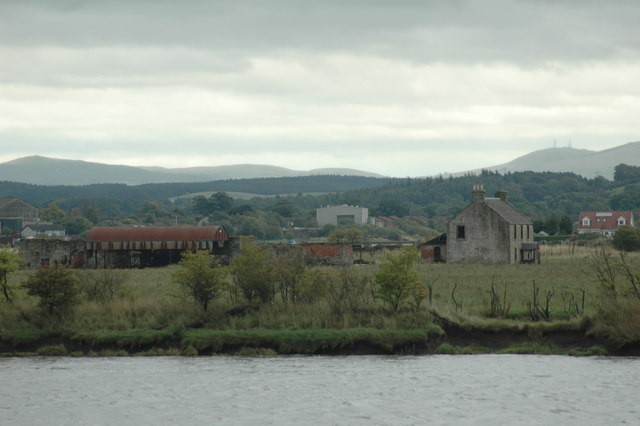
Alloa Inch, showing the ruins

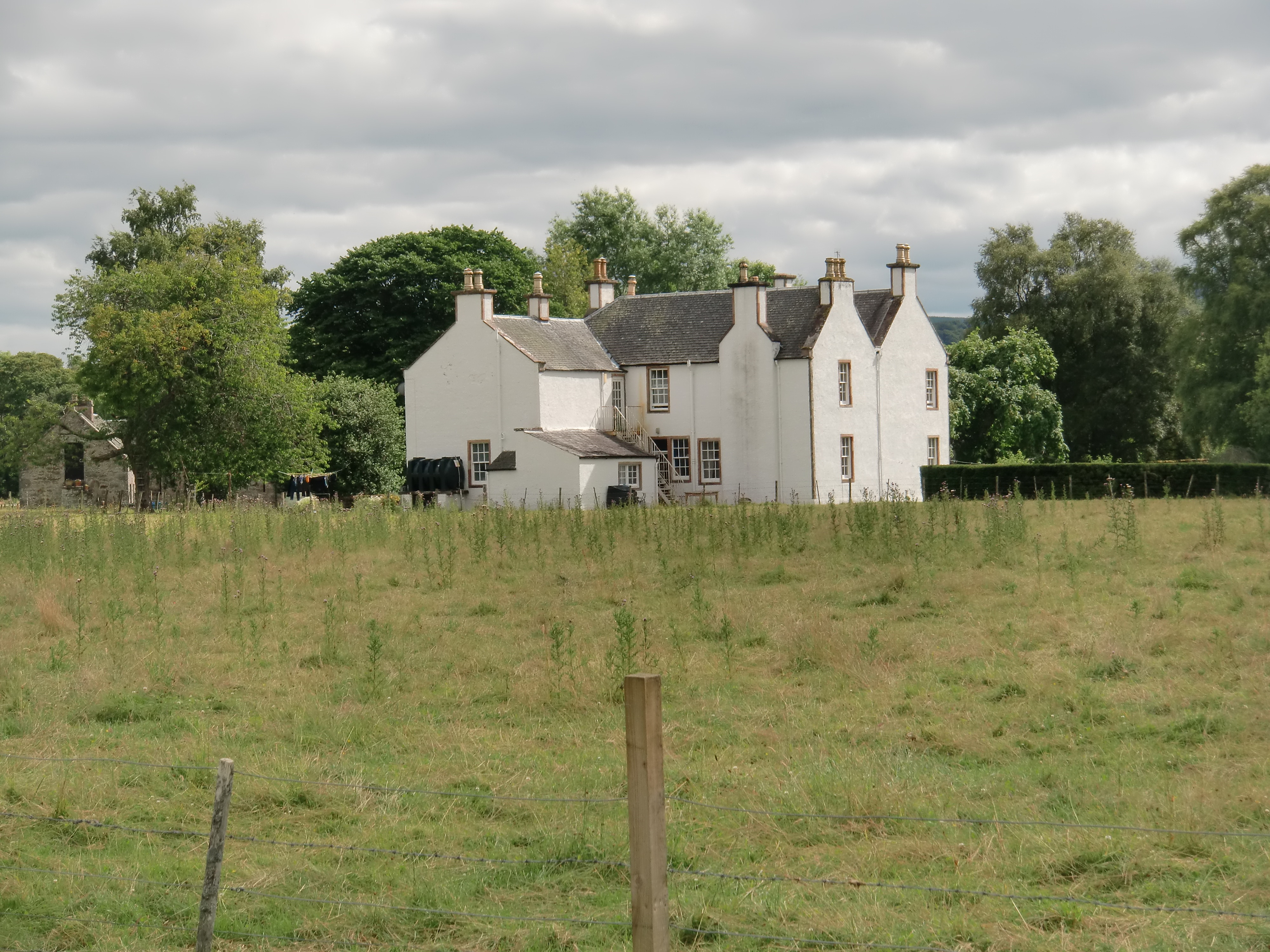
The manse on Contin Island

No part of Scotland is more than about 80.4 kilometres (50 mi) from the sea and as a result Scotland's rivers are neither very wide nor long (although Scotland has many substantial salt water estuaries called firths). The below are islands in freshwater, or where indicated, occasionally reached by high tides and in brackish water.

Local authority	River	OS Grid reference	Islands (Note: (b) Indicates those that from time to time lie in brackish water, as indicated by the Ordnance Survey as lying below the "Mean High Water Springs".)
Aberdeenshire	River Deveron	NJ683625	Scury Islands
Aberdeenshire	River Deveron	NJ637471	Logg Island
Aberdeenshire	River Ythan	NJ998274	Inch Geck (b)
Argyll and Bute	River Orchy	NN160275	Eilean a' Phortair, Garbh Eilean
Argyll and Bute	River Shira	NN139153	Eilean an Eagail
Clackmannanshire	River Forth	NS869918	Alloa Inch (b), Tullibody Inch (b)
Dumfries and Galloway	Carsphairn Lane	NX532961	Wright's Knowe
Dumfries and Galloway	River Annan	NY191692	Rabbit Island
Dumfries and Galloway	River Cree	NX383700	Auchie Isle, Cut Island, Fauld Carnahan Isle
Dumfries and Galloway	River Dee	NX740623	Danevale Island, Float Cock Island, Grainyford Isle, Kennan's Isle, Lamb Island, Lodge Island, (Note: Lodge Island is 20.4ha in extent, making it one of the larger riverine islands.) Stony Island, Threave Island, Whaup Islands
Highland	River Beauly	NH468416	Eilean Aigas
Highland	Black Water	NH438590	Eilean an Daraich, Contin Island
Highland	River Conon	NH533546	Dunglass Island (b), Garrie Island (b), Moy Island
Highland	River Oykel	NC398001	Eilean Thùrnaig
Highland	River Ness	NH663437	Ness Islands
Highland	River Snizort	NG416485	Island of St Columba
Highland	River Spean	NN333803	Eilean an Tulaich
Highland	River Spey	NN599937	Eilean Dubh
Highland	River Spey	NN504946	Eilean Longart
Highland	River Spey	NN551937	Eilean Mhic Rath
Moray	River Spey	NJ287450	Heathery Isle
Moray	River Spey	NJ201415	Island Roary
Moray	River Spey	NJ186413	Stony Island
Scottish Borders	Ettrick Water	NT463285	The Island
Scottish Borders	River Tweed	NT907483	Blount Island (Note: Canny Island at NT891467 is in the middle of the Tweed but on the English side of the border as identified by the Ordnance Survey.)
Scottish Borders	River Tweed	NT882448	Kippie Island (Note: Kippie Island is in the middle of the Tweed on the Scottish side of the border as identified by the Ordnance Survey but is conjoined to Dreeper Island which is on the English side. Historical OS maps show that the channel between the two, once separate, islands narrowed progressively eventually closing sometime between 1922 and 1967.)
Scottish Borders	River Tweed	NT748353	Sharpitlaw Anna
Scottish Borders	River Tweed	NT926495	St. Thomas's Island
South Lanarkshire	River Clyde	NS868438	Clydesholm
Stirling	River Dochart	NN571325	Inchbuie
Perth and Kinross	River Tay	NN998477	Dowally Island, Woodinch
Perth and Kinross	River Tay	NO122222	Moncreiffe Island (b), Insherrit Island (b), The Scone Isles, The Stanners (b)

== Former islands ==
Broch of Clickimin was an islet in Loch of Clickimin just west of Lerwick in Shetland that is now attached to mainland Shetland by a stone causeway. Similarly, 5 kilometres (3.1 mi) to the northwest Law Ting Holm was an islet in Loch of Tingwall attached to mainland Shetland by a submerged stone causeway but with changing water levels of the loch it is now a promontory. Although thought to be the site of last þing held in Shetland it has never been excavated.

There are several former islands in the Tay, created by natural silting and artificial reclamation including: Big Island, Bloody Inches near Murthly, North Inch and South Inch in Perth, Richards Islands, Sleepless Inch and The Inch near Inchtuthil. (Note: North and South Inch are reclaimed parks on the right bank of the Tay, now within the bounds of the town of Perth. Sleepless Island is now a sewage works at NO146220 Bloody Inches is at NO139391 and The Inch at NO106391. Big Island is a former gravel bank at NN992494 and Richards Islands are further upstream on the River Tummel (a tributary of the Tay) at NN955557)

== See also ==
- Battle of the North Inch
- Loch Gorm Castle on Eilean Mòr in Loch Gorm, Islay
- Mugdrum Island, which lies in tidal waters in the Firth of Tay.
- List of islands of Scotland
- List of lochs in Scotland
- List of rivers in Scotland
- Scottish island names
- Waterfalls of Scotland

== References and footnotes ==
General references

- Barrow, G.W.S. (ed.), The Kingdom of the Scots: Government, Church and Society from the Eleventh to the Fourteenth Century (2003) Edinburgh University Press. ISBN 0-7486-1803-1
- Coventry, Martin (2008) Castles of the Clans. Musselburgh. Goblinshead. ISBN 978-1-899874-36-1
- General Register Office for Scotland (28 November 2003) Occasional Paper No 10: Statistics for Inhabited Islands. Retrieved 9 July 2007.
- Grant, Alexander "The Wolf of Badenoch" in W.D.H. Sellar (ed.) (1993) Moray: Province and People. Scottish Society for Northern Studies. Edinburgh; ISBN 0-9505994-7-6
- Haswell-Smith, Hamish (2004). The Scottish Islands. Edinburgh: Canongate. ISBN 978-1-84195-454-7.
- Mac an Tàilleir, Iain (2003) Goireasan Cànain / Language Resources - Tadhail is Ionnsaich : Pàrlamaid na h-Alba. (pdf) Pàrlamaid na h-Alba. Retrieved 26 October 2025.
- Murray, Sir John and Pullar, Laurence (1910) Bathymetrical Survey of the Fresh-Water Lochs of Scotland, 1897-1909. London; Challenger Office.
- Ordnance Survey (2009) "Get-a-map". Retrieved January 2010.

Notes

Citations
