= Falls of Dochart =

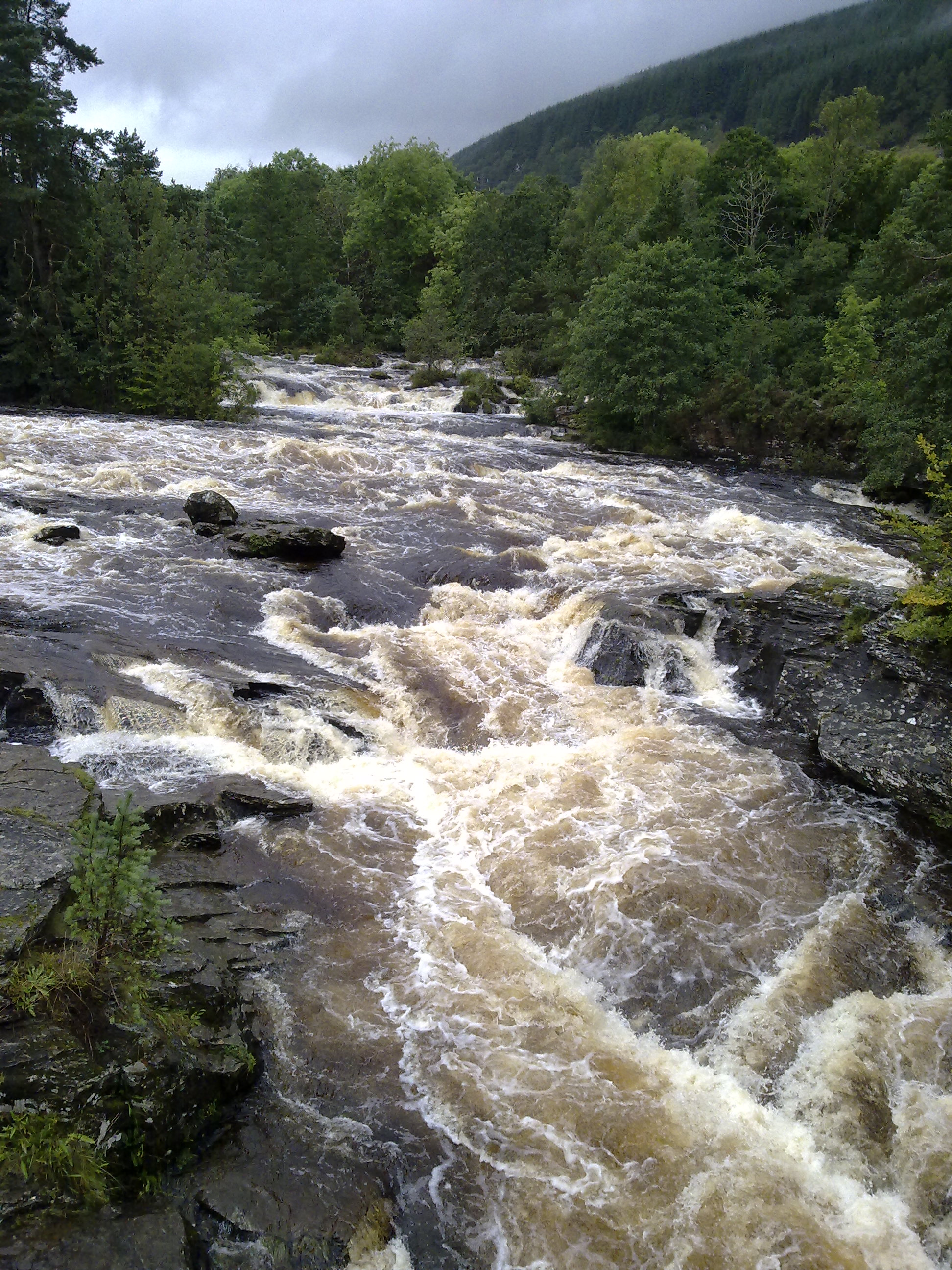
- Falls of Dochart

- Location within Scotland
- Location: Killin, Perthshire, United Kingdom
- Coordinates: 56.462661°N 4.320232°W
- Watercourse: River Dochart

The Falls of Dochart (Scottish Gaelic: Eas Dochart) are a cascade of waterfalls on the River Dochart at Killin in Stirling, Scotland, near the western end of Loch Tay. The Bridge of Dochart, first constructed in 1760, crosses the river at Killin offering a view of the falls as they cascade over the rocks and around the island of Inchbuie, which is the ancient burial place of the MacNab clan.

== Nature conservation ==
The waterfall and its surrounding area belongs to the Loch Lomond and The Trossachs National Park.
