= Garbh Eilean, Loch Maree =

Island in Loch Maree, Scotland

Garbh Eilean
Garbh Eilean (Gaelic)

Location
- Garbh Eilean shown within Highland Scotland
- OS grid reference: NG911725
- Coordinates: 57.7°N 5.5°W

Name
- Name meaning: Rough Island

Physical geography
- Island group: Loch Maree
- Area: 39 ha (96 acres)
- Area rank: (Freshwater: 9)
- Highest elevation: 25 m (82 ft)

Administration
- Council area: Highland
- Country: Scotland
- Sovereign state: United Kingdom

Demographics
- Population: 0

Garbh Eilean is a forested island in Loch Maree, Wester Ross, Scotland.

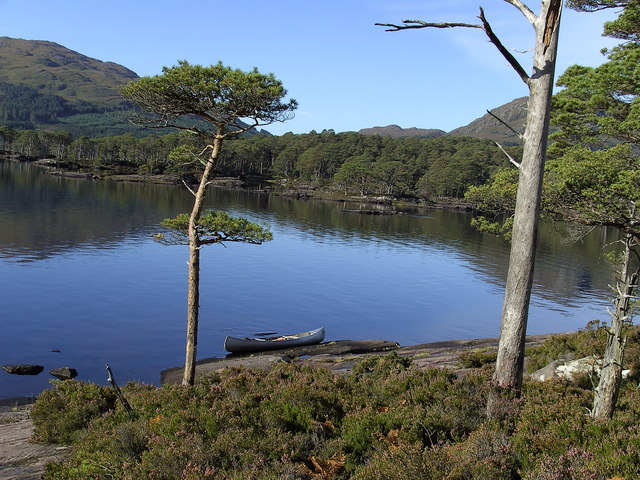
Garbh Eilean looking to Eilean Ruairidh Mòr

Garbh Eilean lies between Eilean Sùbhainn and Eilean Ruairidh Mòr. The islands are among the least disturbed in Britain. They are managed as the Loch Maree National Nature Reserve by agreements between Scottish Natural Heritage and their owners.
