= Dunglass Island =

Uninhabited island in Scottish Highlands

Innis Dhùn Ghlais (Gaelic)

Location
- Location within Scotland
- OS grid reference: NH535545
- Coordinates: 57.5572°N 4.4493°W

Name
- Name meaning: grey fort island

Physical geography
- Island group: Freshwater
- Area: 40 hectares (99 acres)
- Area rank: 220= (Freshwater: 8)
- Highest elevation: 8 metres (26 ft)

Administration
- Council area: Highland
- Country: Scotland
- Sovereign state: United Kingdom

Demographics
- Population: 0

Dunglass Island is an uninhabited island in the River Conon south-west of the village of Conon Bridge in the Highlands of Scotland. At approximately 40 hectares (99 acres) in extent, it is one of Scotland's largest freshwater islands.

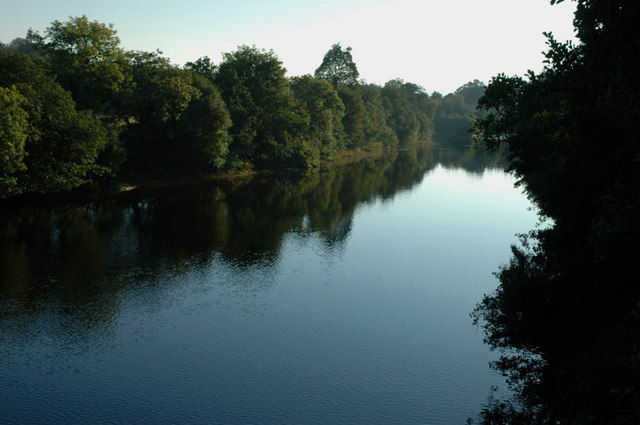
Dunglass island and River Conon

The island, which contains the site of an Iron Age fort, can be reached by a wooden road bridge accessed by a track leading from the farm of Dunglass on the west side of the river or across a footbridge that spans a weir at the south-west extremity of the island.

Following a substantial flood in 1892, Nairne described the island as follows:

Port of Dunglass farm, about 100 acres (40 ha), consists of Dunglass Island in the river and the embankment here broke, with the result that over twenty acres was covered with a thick layer of gravel that renders it unfit for further tillage. The Conon channel used to be the larger of the two but a gravel bank was thrown across above the Islands, and the greatest part of the river, for a time flowed through the Dunglass channel. The diversion of the river caused enormous damage to salmon ova, as the breeding banks were left dry, and something like a million ova practically became useless.

In 2004, a £38,000 biodiversity project involving Scottish Natural Heritage, Conon District Salmon Fishery Board, Brahan Estates, the Highland Council and Ross and Cromarty Enterprise was undertaken. Dense plantation woodland was removed and 400 tonnes (390 long tons) of cobblestones repositioned to aid salmon spawning, which also benefited other river species such as lampreys. This work restored an alder-lined channel through the island, which had become "defunct".
