= Ann Davison (sailor) =

English sailor

Ann Davison (5 June 1913 – 12 May 1992) was an author and sailor. At the age of 39, she was the first woman to single-handedly sail the Atlantic Ocean. She departed Plymouth, England in her 23-foot boat Felicity Ann on 18 May 1952.

== Early life and education ==
Margaret Ann Longstaffe was born on 5 June 1913, in Carshalton, South London, to Josephine (nee Pattison Boutflour) (1891–1928) and William Longstaffe, an accountant. She was interested in horses which led to a brief period at the London Veterinary College. She then became interested in planes and she trained as a pilot. She earned her pilot's licence on 5 February 1935 at the Insurance Flying Club in Hanworth, flying a De Havilland DH 60 Moth. She held a 'B' licence and worked as a freelance commercial pilot flying both people and cargo. She met owner and manager of Hooton Airfield, Frank Davison through this line of work, which led to his divorce from pilot Elsie Joy Davison, who later died in the service of the Air Transport Auxiliary during World War Two. The couple married in 1939 and Longstaffe became known as Ann Davison.

== Voyages ==
In 1949 Ann and Frank Davison attempted to sail to the Caribbean, to start a new life. They hit bad weather and battled gales in the English Channel for 19 days. Their boat crashed against rocks in southern England, leading to Frank Davison's death the following morning. Ann Davison came close to death but survived.

On 18 May 1952 Ann Davison set sail from Plymouth, England in her 23-foot boat Felicity Ann, having vowed to finish the journey she had originally set out on with her late husband. She landed in Brittany, Portugal, Morocco and the Canary Islands, before setting sail across the Atlantic on 20 November 1952, aiming to make land-fall in Antigua. In the event storms pushed her south and having been driven past Barbados she eventually touched land in Dominica on 23 January 1953. After an extended stopover in the Caribbean she sailed north to Florida and finally to New York by way of the Intracoastal Waterway.

== Books ==
Davison was the author of several other autobiographical works. Her first two books Last Voyage: An Autobiographical Account of All That Led Up to an Illicit Voyage and the Outcome Thereof and Home was an Island were written and published in 1952 to pay off debts incurred with her husband in re-furbishing a 70-foot ketch, "Reliance". which they bought at the end of the Second World War with the aim of crossing the Atlantic and a new life.

In her first book, Last Voyage, she describes her life in the early 1930s as an aviator, delivering mail around the UK, and her marriage to Frank Davison, another aviator, with whom she worked at a small commercial airfield at Hooton, Wirral Peninsula, which had to be closed at the start of World War II. But the main part of the book, and the title, is about their ill-fated purchase of Reliance.

The boat, which was alongside at Fleetwood, Lancashire, required more refurbishment than anticipated and Frank was unwilling to compromise on standards. Debts grew, and with a writ of repossession about to be nailed to the mast, Ann and Frank hurriedly set sail for the West Indies, with the boat unfinished, and into the teeth of a gale. After intense hardship, first blown down the Irish Sea then to the East along the English Channel, they were wrecked on the east side of Portland Bill on 4 June 1949, where he drowned. Ann Davison managed to scramble ashore.

Her second book, Home was an Island, describes their life after the sale of their airfield and before the purchase of Reliance, during which time they bought and farmed the small islands of Inchmurrin and then Inchfad on Loch Lomond.

Her autobiographical account was published as My Ship is so Small.

== Later life ==
Davison settled in Florida and married Bert Billheimer, a former Miami Herald photographer. The couple shared an interest in boats, but Davison sold the Felicity Ann and gave up solo sailing, stating in her book, My Ship Is So Small, that she “knew what single-handed sailing was like now, the experience was complete."

She spent her final years in relative obscurity, residing on a ranch in Lorida, Florida where she raised exotic cats with her second husband. Davison died on May 12, 1992. She was 78.

== Legacy and commemoration ==
The Felicity Ann, built by Mashford Bros of Cremyll (Cornwall) in 1939, has recently (2008–2009) been in private possession in Haines, Alaska undergoing initial restoration, but has now been donated to the Northwest School of Boatbuilding in Port Hadlock, Washington for further restoration. The original design for the Felicity Ann and three other identical hulls are from 1936. The Felicity Ann has been almost fully restored, and on 6 August 2017 the title was transferred to the Community Boat Project in Port Hadlock, WA by the Northwest School of Wooden Boatbuilding where students and volunteers did most of the planking restoration. The boat will be finished by volunteers and will be sailed around the Puget Sound area next year before being used for sailing instruction.

In 2017 a blue plaque recognising Davison was unveiled at Mere Brook House (where she lived from 1939) which is near Thornton Hough, Wirral.

Ann Davison was the subject of a New York Times Overlooked article on 3 December 2022.

== Bibliography ==
- Davison, Ann. (1952). Last Voyage: An Autobiographical Account of All That Led Up to an Illicit Voyage and the Outcome Thereof. London, Peter Davies.
- Davison, Ann. (1952). Home was an Island. London, Peter Davies.
- Davison, Ann. (1956). My Ship is so Small. London, Peter Davies.
- Davison, Ann. (1962). By Gemini or Marshmallows in the Salad. London, Peter Davies.
- Davison, Ann. (1964). Florida Junket. London, Peter Davies.
