= Eilean Mòr, Loch Langavat =

Scottish island

Eilean Mòr
Eilean Mòr (Gaelic)
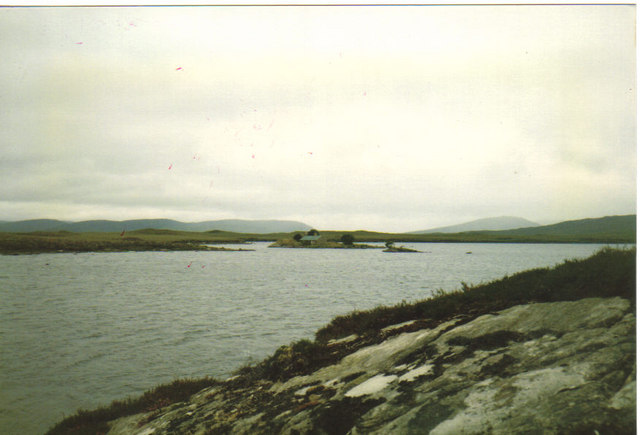

Location
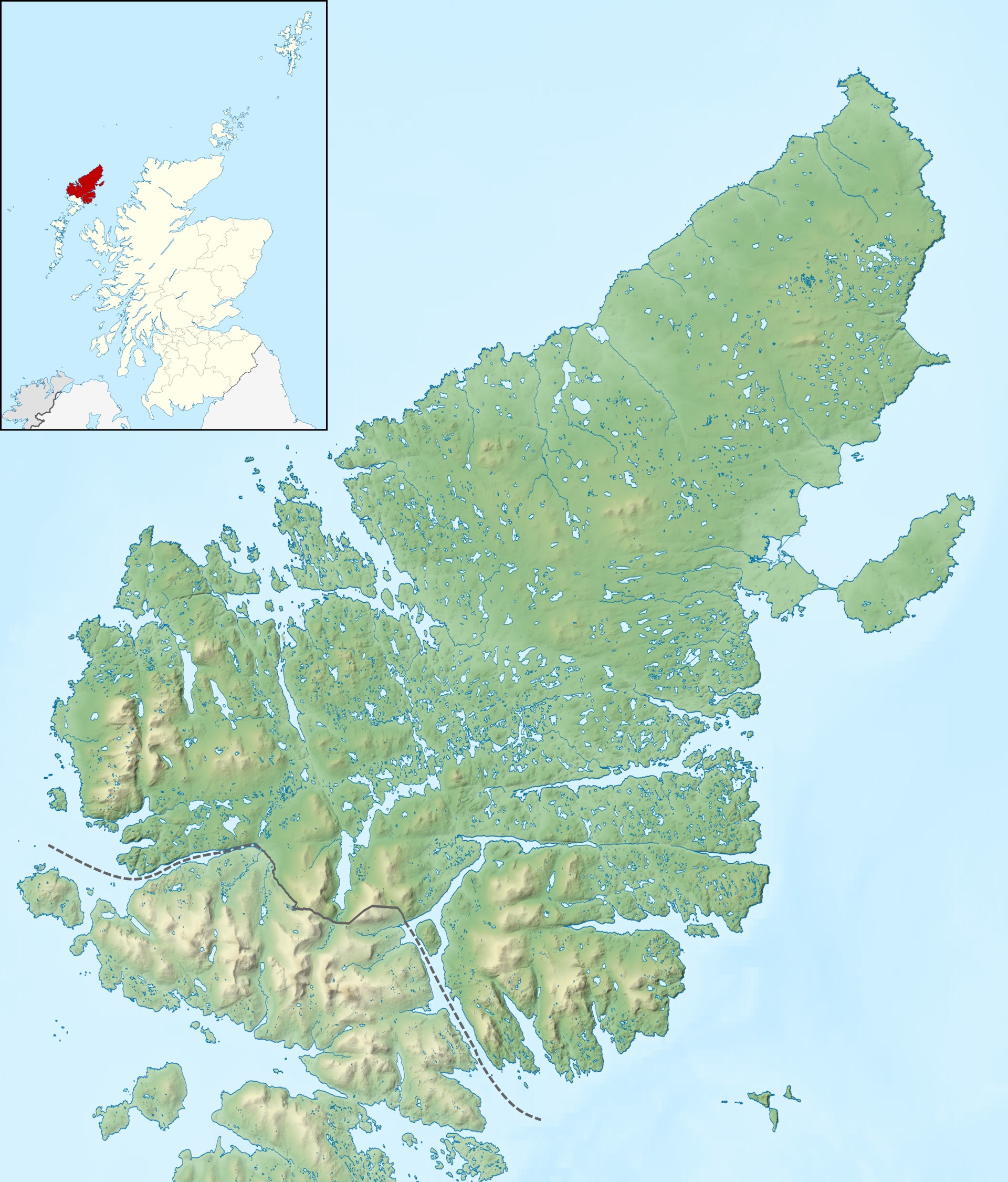
- Eilean Mòr shown next to Lewis Eilean Mòr shown within the Outer Hebrides
- OS grid reference: NB217221
- Coordinates: 58.101°N 6.725°W

Name
- Name meaning: Big island

Physical geography
- Island group: Lewis
- Area: 59 hectares (150 acres)
- Area rank: 183= (Freshwater 5)
- Highest elevation: 64 metres (210 ft)

Administration
- Council area: Na h-Eileanan Siar
- Country: Scotland
- Sovereign state: United Kingdom

Demographics
- Population: 0

Eilean Mòr is an island in Loch Langavat on the Isle of Lewis in the Outer Hebrides of Scotland.
