= Rainish Eilean Mòr =

Island in the Outer Hebrides, Scotland

Rainish Eilean Mòr (Gaelic)

Location
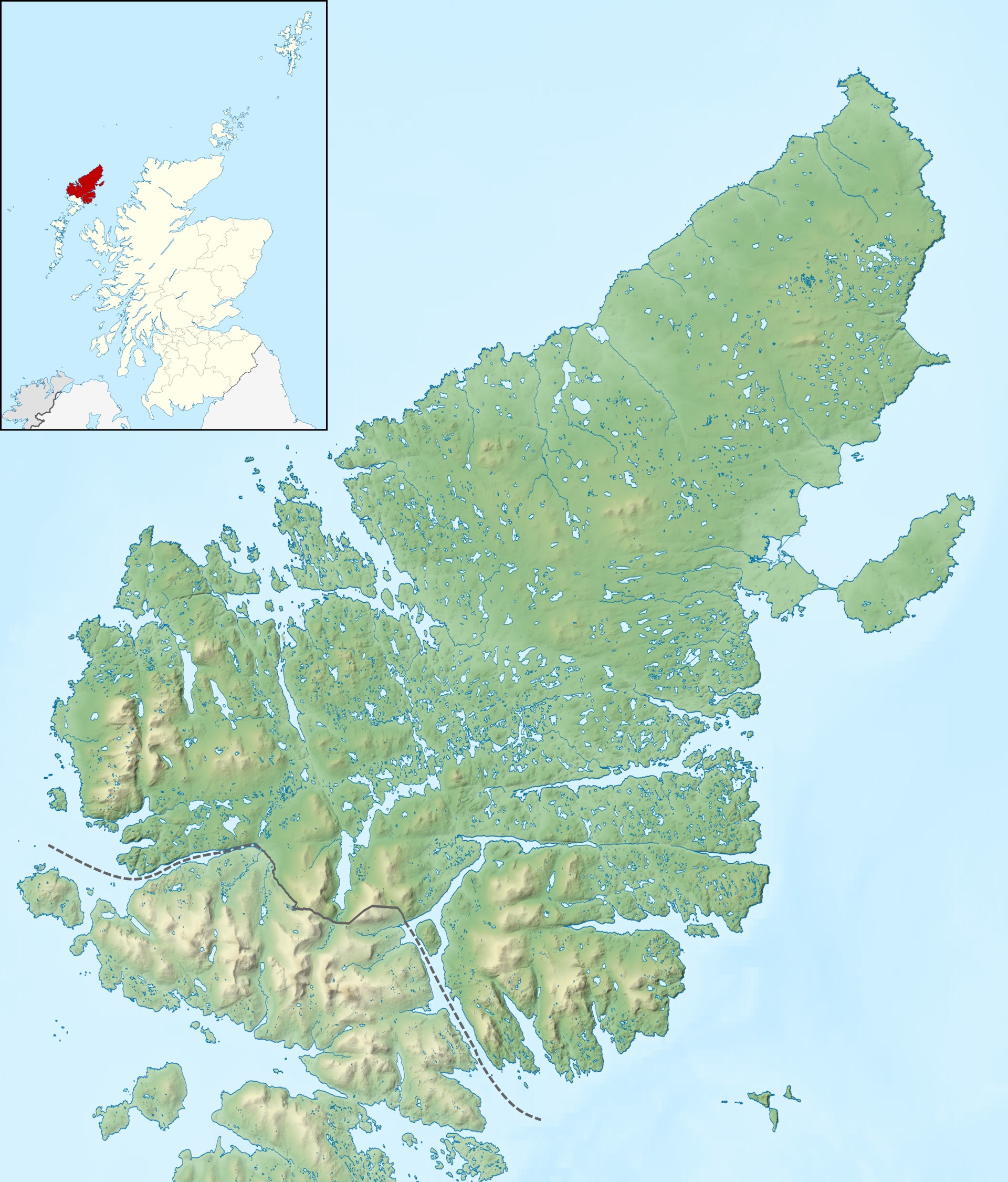
- Rainish Eilean Mòr shown next to Lewis Rainish Eilean Mòr shown within the Outer Hebrides
- OS grid reference: NB386280
- Coordinates: 58.1637°N 6.44°W

Name
- Name meaning: large island of Rainish

Physical geography
- Island group: Freshwater
- Area: 27 ha (67 acres)
- Highest elevation: 70 m (230 ft)

Administration
- Council area: Na h-Eileanan Siar
- Country: Scotland
- Sovereign state: United Kingdom

Demographics
- Population: 0

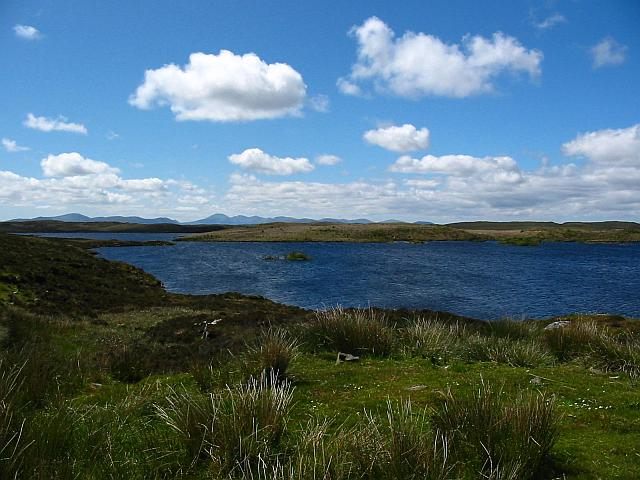
Loch Orasaigh and Rainish Eilean Mòr with the hills of Harris beyond.

Rainish Eilean Mòr is an uninhabited island in Loch Orasaigh, north of the village of Leurbost in the area of South Lochs on the Isle of Lewis, Lewis and Harris. At 27 hectares (67 acres) in extent, it is one of Scotland's larger freshwater islands, but it is probably the largest relative to the size of the body of water in which it sits, Loch Orasaigh being only about 125 hectares (310 acres) in area.

The entirety of the loch has been an SSSI since 1983 and the island's perimeter and the neighbouring islet to the south west have woodland cover including the species of Rowan, Aspen, Downy Birch, Grey Willow and Sallow Willow. The underlying geology is Lewisian Gneiss overlain by peaty podzols and gleys.

The Gaelic name of the island means "large island of Rainish" and is taken from the surrounding area, which itself means "Roe deer headland", from Old Norse.
