= Felicity Ann =

History
- Name: Felicity Ann
- Builder: Mashfords Brothers, Cremyll, Cornwall, England
- Laid down: 1939
- Launched: 1949
- Fate: Restored 2018

General characteristics
- Type: Sloop
- Tonnage: 4 tons (Thames Measurement)
- Length: 23 ft (7.0 m) o/a; 19 ft (5.8 m) w/l
- Beam: 7 ft 6 in (2.29 m)
- Draught: 4 ft 6 in (1.37 m)
- Propulsion: 1 × 5 hp (4 kW) Coventry-Victor diesel engine
- Sail plan: Fore-and-aft rig; Sail area 237 sq ft (22.0 m^{2})

Felicity Ann is the 23-foot (7.0 m) wooden sloop sailed in 1952–1953 by Ann Davison in the first singlehanded transatlantic crossing by a woman. The vessel was designed and built by Mashfords Brothers Ltd at the Cremyll Shipyard in Cornwall, England.

When construction commenced in 1939 the boat was originally built under the name Peter Piper, but, delayed by World War II, it was launched in 1949 as Felicity Ann. It was purchased by Ann Davison in 1952, using funds from her book detailing the sailing misadventure that resulted in her husband's death, Last Voyage. In 1956 her story of the 254-day transatlantic crossing in Felicity Ann was published as My Ship is So Small.

In 2007 Felicity Ann was in private possession in Haines, Alaska, and it underwent some restoration. Felicity Ann left Alaska in 2009 and is now in the hands of the Northwest School of Wooden Boatbuilding at Port Hadlock, Washington, where she was restored and launched in May 2018.
