= Loch Insh =

Freshwater lake in the Scottish Highlands

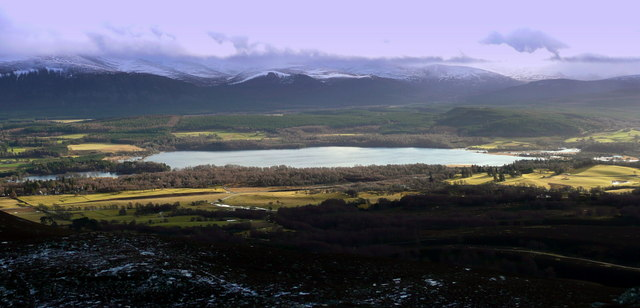

- Location within Highland
- Location: Highlands, Scotland
- Coordinates: 57°07′N 3°55′W
- Type: freshwater loch
- Catchment area: 762 km^{2} (294 sq mi)
- Basin countries: United Kingdom
- Surface area: 1.3 km^{2} (0.50 sq mi)
- Average depth: 11.4 m (37 ft)
- Max. depth: 30.5 m (100 ft)

Loch Insh is a loch in the Scottish Highlands. It is situated in the Cairngorms National Park on the River Spey, in the heart of Badenoch and Strathspey, immediately downstream of the Insh Marshes. It is around six miles (10 km) south-west of Aviemore and five miles (8 km) north-east of Kingussie. The nearest village to the loch is Kincraig, just to the north.

The loch is a popular location for sailing, windsurfing and kayaking/canoeing, and has a watersports and outdoor centre on the eastern side of the loch. It is also a popular fishing spot for Brown trout and Pike, either from the banks or a boat, although a permit is required.

Loch Insh is roughly rectangular, about 1.4 km (0.9 mi) long and 0.8 km (0.5 mi) wide, with a small island, Tom Dubh near the outlet. The loch is fairly shallow, with an average depth of 11.4 m (37 ft), and is 214 m (702 ft) above Ordnance datum.

== Loch Insh Outdoor Centre ==
A water sports centre was set up on Loch Insh in 1969 by Clive Freshwater and his wife Sally, leasing a small boathouse from the Forestry Commission. It has since been developed into a multi-sport outdoor centre with a restaurant, bar and shop, plus a range of accommodation including chalets and Insh Hall. In 2005, the Princess Royal opened an extension to the centre.

Freshwater offered trips down the River Spey, but the landowners argued they were disturbing the Salmon fisheries. After protracted wrangling, he eventually won the case four years later. The "Spey Canoe Case" was decided in the House of Lords, having been described as "the biggest case on water rights in Scotland for the last 250 years". Freshwater had personally gathered evidence to show the river was being used for public navigation in the 18th century, thus the Spey was a public navigable waterway.

== Loch Insh Ospreys ==
The island of Tom Dubh at the outlet of Loch Insh has been the nesting site for pairs of Osprey since 1993. By August 2020, 53 young Ospreys had been successfully raised, with three siblings in that year alone. The island is part of the RSPB's Insh Marshes reserve, and spikes were added to the tree in 1995 to deter egg thieves.

== Gallery ==
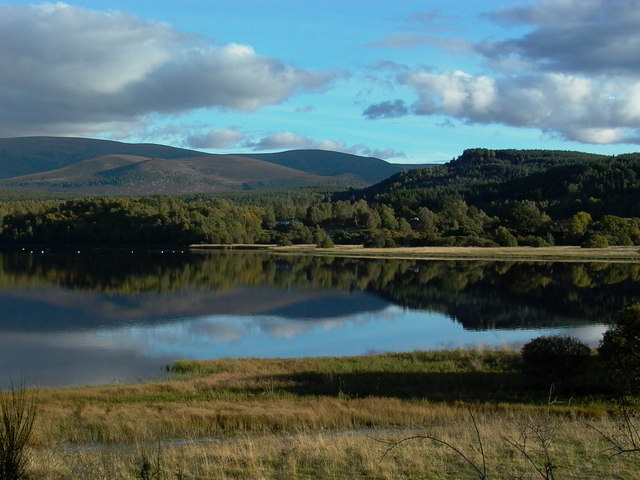
Skyline across Loch Insh

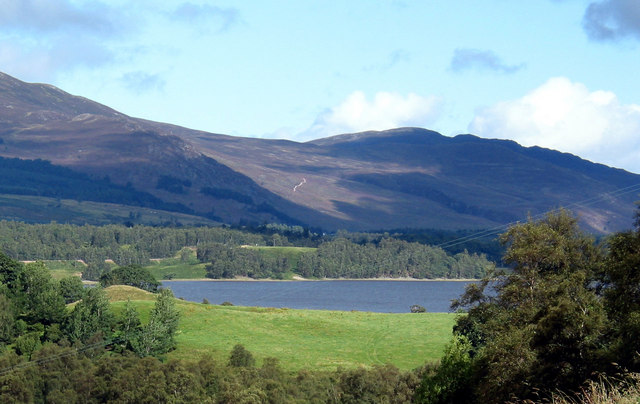
Loch Insh

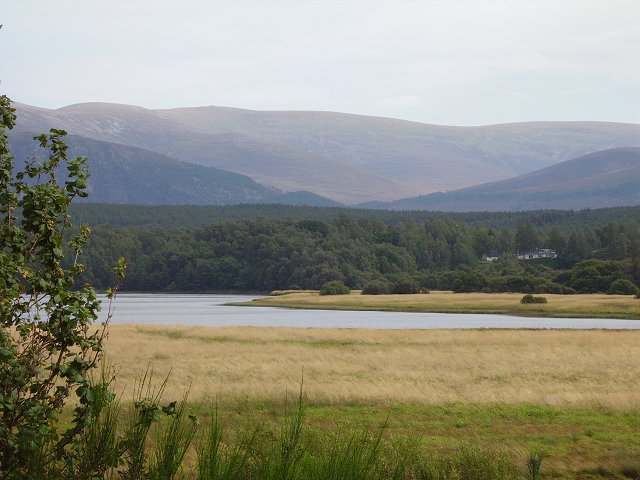
Loch Insh with miles of marshland upstream towards Kingussie

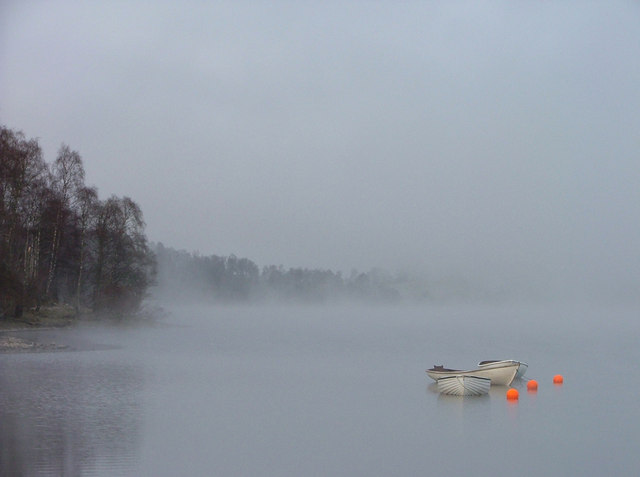
Loch Insh in the mist

== See also ==
- List of freshwater islands in Scotland
