= Loch an Eilein =

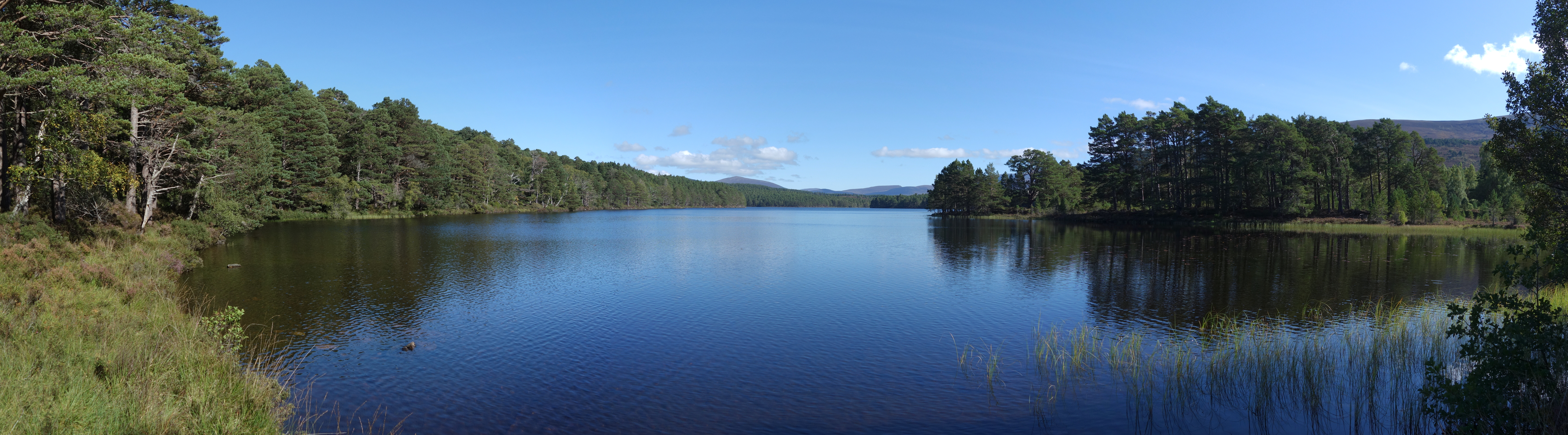

- Location within Highland
- Location: Badenoch and Strathspey, Scotland
- Coordinates: 57°08′49″N 3°49′27″W
- Type: freshwater loch
- Primary outflows: Milton Burn
- Basin countries: United Kingdom
- Max. length: > 1 mi (1.6 km)
- Max. width: < 0.5 mi (0.80 km)
- Surface area: 56.1 ha (139 acres)
- Average depth: 25.5 ft (7.8 m)
- Max. depth: 66 ft (20 m)
- Water volume: 144,000,000 ft^{3} (4,100,000 m^{3})
- Surface elevation: 256 m (840 ft)
- Islands: 1 island with ruined castle

Loch an Eilein is a small irregularly shaped, freshwater loch in the Rothiemurchus Forest about 5 km (3.1 mi) south of Aviemore, Scotland in Cairngorms National Park. Loch an Eilein comes from the Scottish Gaelic and means 'Loch of the island'. Walks around the loch are popular.

== History of usage ==
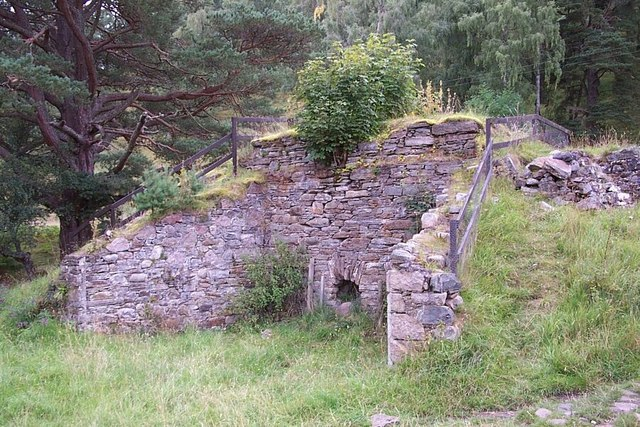
Lime kiln at Loch an Eilein

In the late 18th and early 19th century, the loch was used mainly for two things. On the banks of the loch there is a limestone kiln where the limestone was collected from a rockface looking over the loch. Also loggers used the connecting river to float logs down to the wood-treating factories downstream. Rob Roy and other cattle rustlers used the loch, and one side of the loch is called 'Robbers Way'. There are only three remaining houses on the banks of the loch. One of the former farm sites is now being used as the location for the Loch an Eilein Gallery.

== Loch an Eilein castle ==
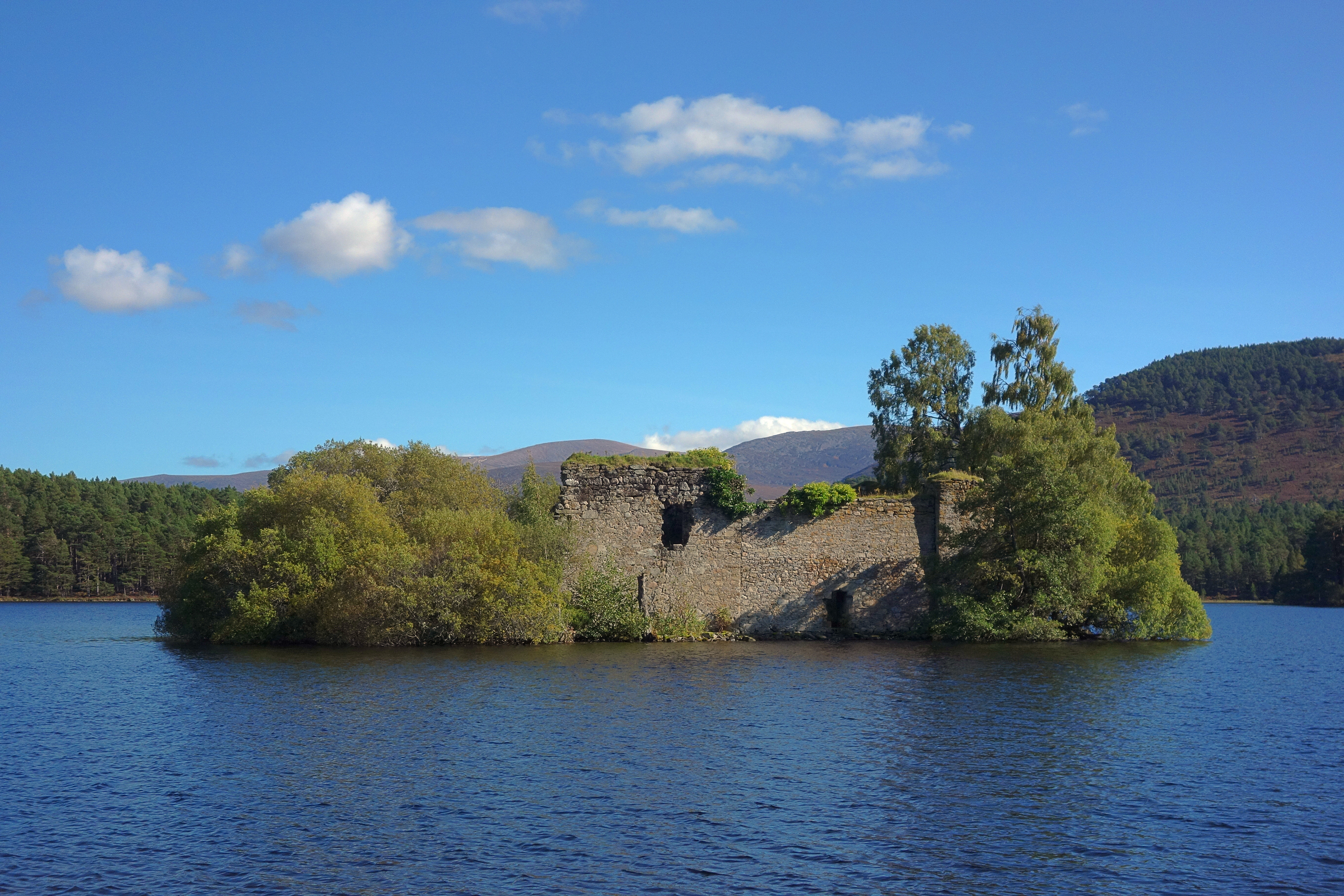
Loch an Eilein Castle

On an island in the middle of the Loch are the ruins of a small 14th century castle. It was originally constructed as a place of refuge from thieves and threatening activities. The castle is said to have once been the property of Alexander Stewart the Wolf of Badenoch.

The castle was the site of conflict. The Jacobites, retreating from Cromdale in 1690, besieged the castle. Dame Grizel Mor Grant, widow of the fifth laird Grant, held the castle against the Jacobites. The castle fell out of use in the late 18th century.

The castle may have originally been connected to the shore by a causeway. The causeway became submerged when the water level in the loch was raised by estate work and the building of a dam in the 18th century. The castle was used as the site of the island graveyard in BBC TV’s ‘Monarch of the Glen’.

== About the park ==
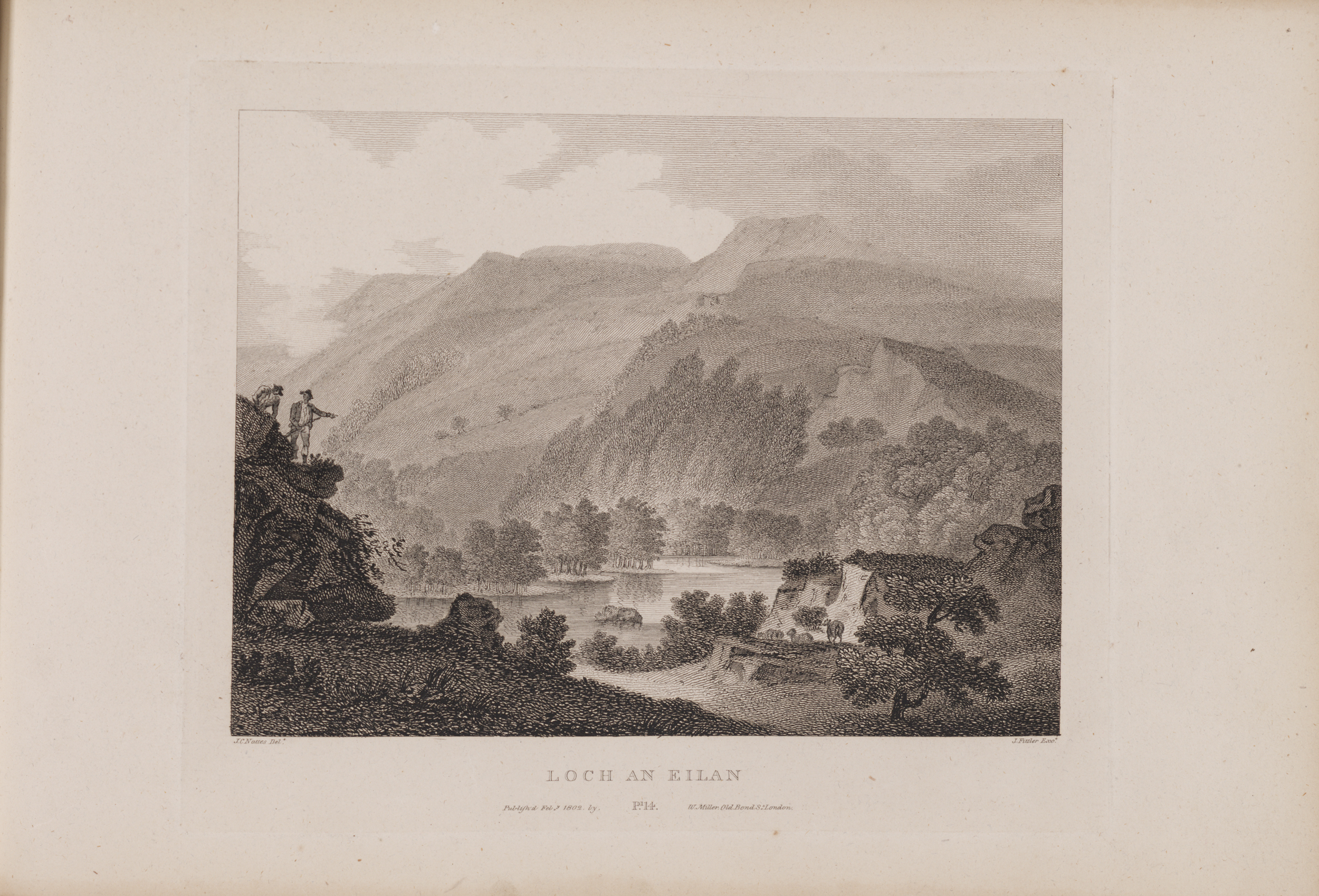
Engraving of a view of the loch by James Fittler in Scotia Depicta, published 1804

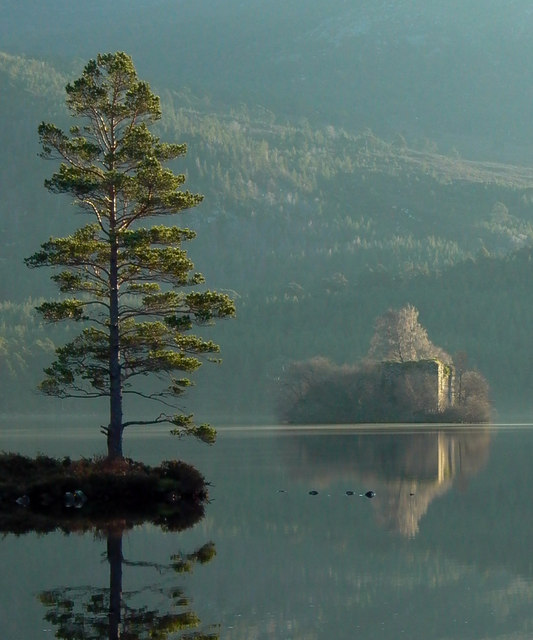
Pine tree at Loch an Eilein

Located in Cairngorms National Park, the loch and the forest around it are popular with birdwatchers, walkers, mountain bikers and day-trippers. Among the birds found on or around Loch an Eilein are the crested tit, common redstart, spotted flycatcher, tree pipit, red-throated diver, common sandpiper, whinchat, and the occasional merlin. The Loch has been voted on the UK's best picnic spot. The Loch an Eilein park has numerous facilities, including washrooms, visitor centre, and a car park. It is notable for its accessibility due to the flat and even nature of the five kilometre trail which loops around the loch.
