= Inchlonaig =

Island in Loch Lomond, Scotland

Location
- Location within Scotland
- OS grid reference: NS380934
- Coordinates: 56.10°N 4.60°W

Name
- Name meaning: "Island of Yew Trees"

Physical geography
- Island group: Loch Lomond
- Area: 80 ha
- Area rank: 162= (Freshwater: 3)
- Highest elevation: 62 m (203 ft)

Administration
- Council area: Argyll and Bute
- Country: Scotland
- Sovereign state: United Kingdom

Demographics
- Population: 0

Inchlonaig is an island in Loch Lomond in Scotland.

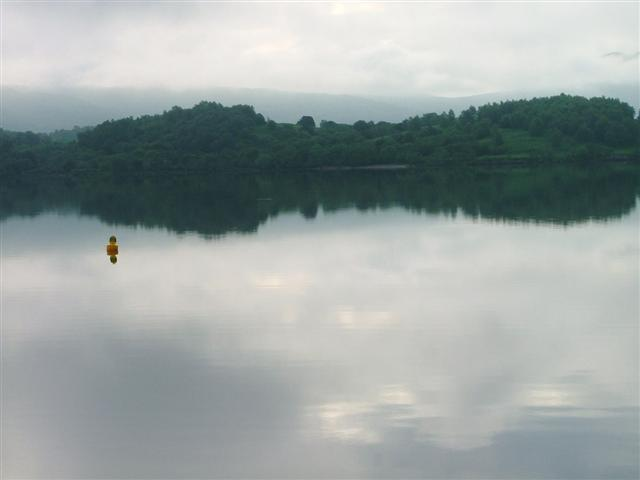
Inchlonaig viewed from Luss across Loch Lomond

== Geography and geology ==
Inchlonaig is the most northerly of the larger islands in the Loch Lomond, just south of where it narrows into a ribbon loch, and north of Inchconnachan.

== History ==
Inchlonaig has traces of human habitation dating back to 5000BC.

Scattered across the island are yew trees. The travel writer, H.V. Morton visited in the 1930s, and mentions:

Inchclonaig [sic], the 'marsh isle' whose yew trees, it is said, were planted by Robert the Bruce for his archers.

It is also stated that King Robert used this supply to make bows before the fourteenth century Battle of Bannockburn. The island was thus of great value and the trees maintained with the utmost care.

Strathcashel, a stronghold of the Dukes of Montrose was opposite Inchlonaig.

Rob Roy fixed the amount of money he was to extort from Clan Colquhoun here.

At various times, the island has been a deer park, especially by Sir James Colquhoun in the 17th century and a place of confinement for drunkards and the mentally ill.

In 1873, Sir James Colquhoun, the clan chief, and some ghillies drowned after going hunting here, and they are buried together at Luss.

== Current use ==
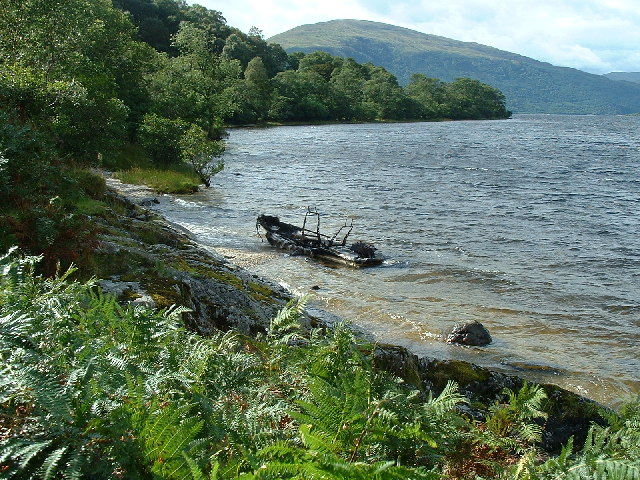
Shore on the east side of Inchlonaig

A stone cottage is now used as a holiday home. The island is classified by the National Records of Scotland as an inhabited island that "had no usual residents at the time of either the 2001 or 2011 censuses."

The beaches on the island are also a common location for campers who are looking for a more quiet campsite.

== See also ==
- List of islands of Scotland
