= Inchfad =

Island in Scotland

Innis Fada (Gaelic)

Location
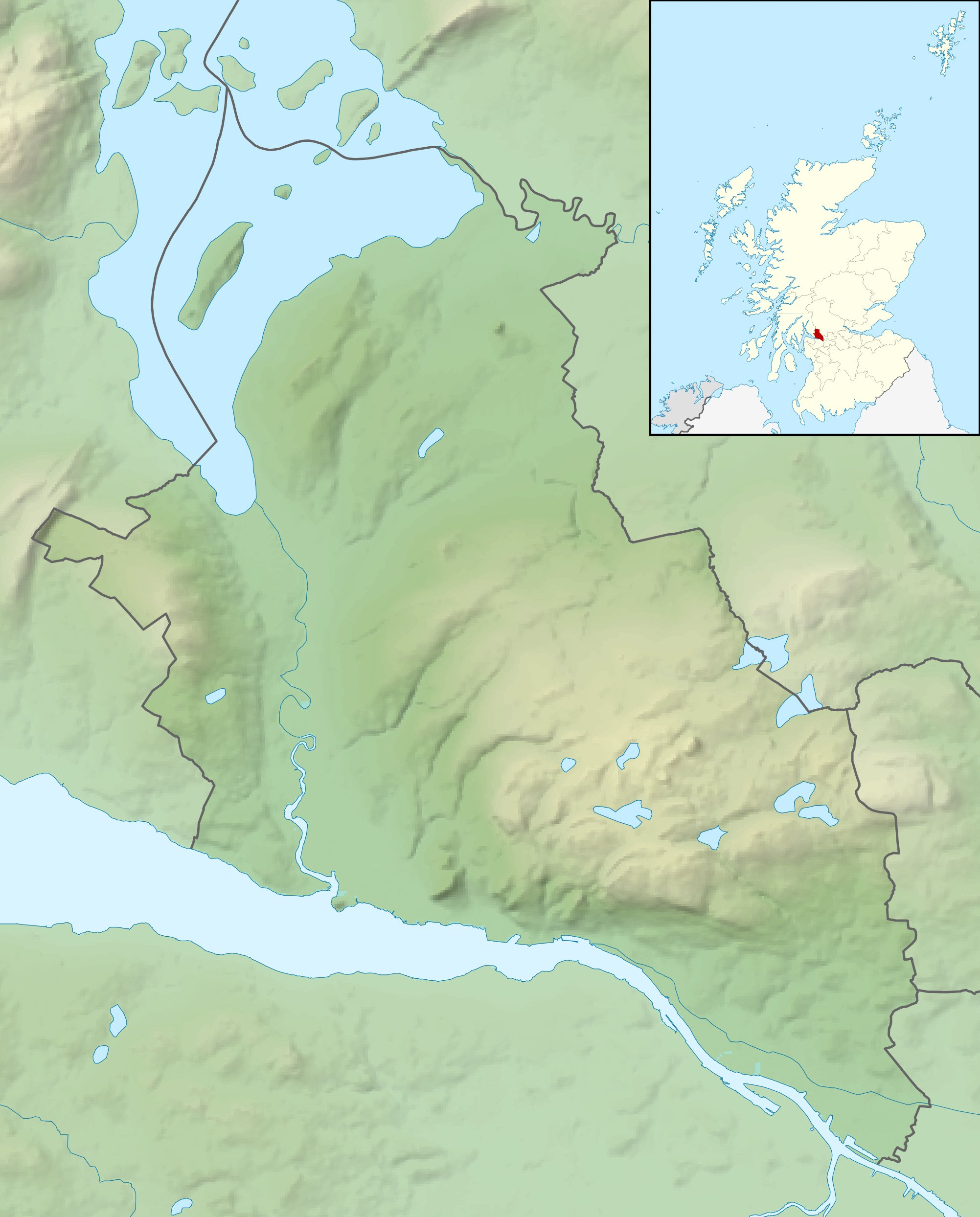
- Location within West Dunbartonshire
- OS grid reference: NS400910
- Coordinates: 56.085°N 4.572°W

Name
- Name meaning: long island

Physical geography
- Island group: Loch Lomond
- Area: 35 ha
- Area rank: (Freshwater: 11)
- Highest elevation: 24 m (79 ft)

Administration
- Council area: Stirling
- Country: Scotland
- Sovereign state: United Kingdom

Demographics
- Population: 1
- Population rank: 95= (Freshwater: 4=)

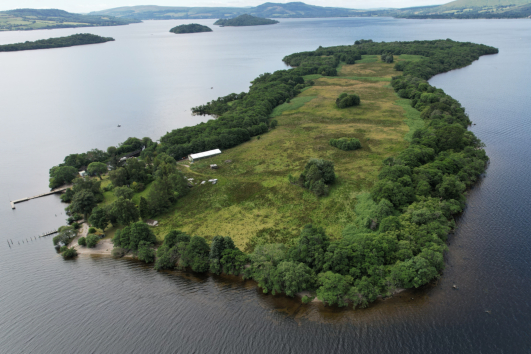
Inchfad in 2022

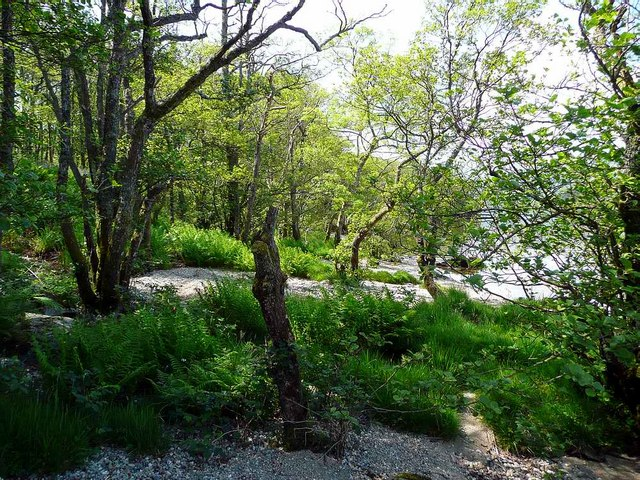
Woodland on Inchfad

Inchfad (Scottish Gaelic: Innis Fada, "long island") is an island in the south east of Loch Lomond in Scotland.

Inchfad is 1.35 km (0.84 mi) long and 35 hectares in area. Its highest point is 25 metres. The island forms part of the parish of Buchanan in west central Scotland, formerly part of Stirlingshire and now under Stirling Council.

Inchfad is partially wooded and has a single permanent resident as of 2022. There are four houses on Inchfad, a modernized bungalow which served as the original farmhouse and a wooden house used as a holiday home.

The very small island of Ellanderroch is just off its south-western tip.

There is a canal on the island which is 1/4 mile (400 metres) long, connected with the distillery.

== History ==
After the closure of illicit whisky stills around the loch, Inchfad became the home of a registered distillery. The ruins can be seen to this day.

Inchfad was taken over by the MacFarlanes in the early 18th century, who ran a government distillery until the mid 19th century, and their descendants run the boatyard at Balmaha nearby, as well as the island's mail service. Other owners have included the Dukes of Montrose, and Charles Collins, founder of the publishing dynasty.

The island was bought in 1944 by an English couple called Davison, who set about restoring the farm to working condition. Everything was brought up by train from the Wirral, including livestock. After they succeeded, they sold the island, and set off in a converted fishing vessel, which was wrecked off Portland Bill drowning Frank Davison. His widow Ann Davison later wrote an autobiography called Home was an Island about their life on Inchmurrin and Inchfad.

In 1953 Ann Davison then went on to sail the Atlantic single handed and was the first woman to accomplish this. She spent her later life in the US.

== See also ==
- List of islands of Scotland
- Inverarnan Canal
