= Ellanderroch =

Island in Scotland

Coordinates: 56°4′46″N 4°34′52″W

Ellanderroch (Scottish Gaelic: Eilean Darach/Eilean nan Darach meaning "oak island") is an island in Loch Lomond in Scotland.

It is a very small island, 100 metres in breadth at its widest point. It lies a short distance to the south-west of the larger island of Inchfad.

The island has been used as a shelter for fishermen. There are many oaks left on the small island; a hollow one was filled in with concrete, but was struck by lightning, and now only the concrete remains.

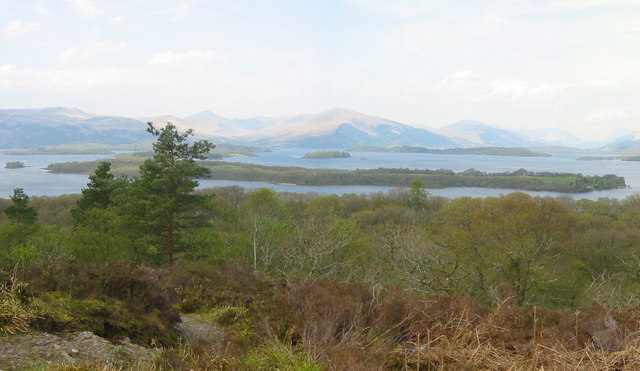
Ellanderoch is the small island on the far left, taken from Inchcailloch with Inchfad in the middle distance.
