= Eilean nan Deargannan =

Island in Scotland

Coordinates: 56.150872°N 4.647474°W

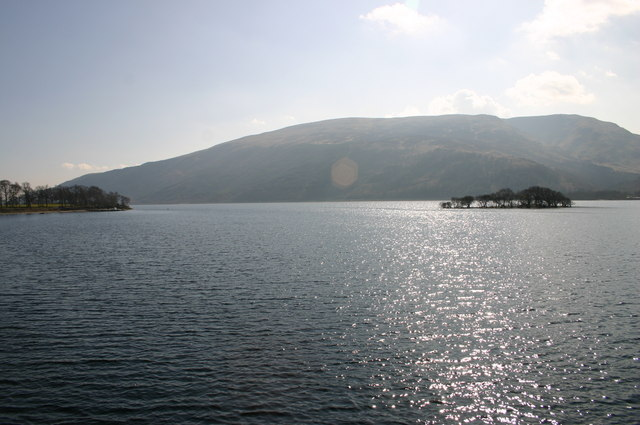
Eilean nan Deargannan

Eilean nan Deargannan (sometimes written as Eilean Deargannan) is a small island in Loch Lomond, in west central Scotland. It lies between Rowardennan (to the east) and Inverbeg.

== Etymology ==
The name is thought to mean "Island of fleas or sandhoppers" in Scottish Gaelic. It has euphemistically been suggested to come from "purple island" as well.
