= River Dochart =

River in Perthshire, Scotland

Coordinates: 56°29′N 4°18′W

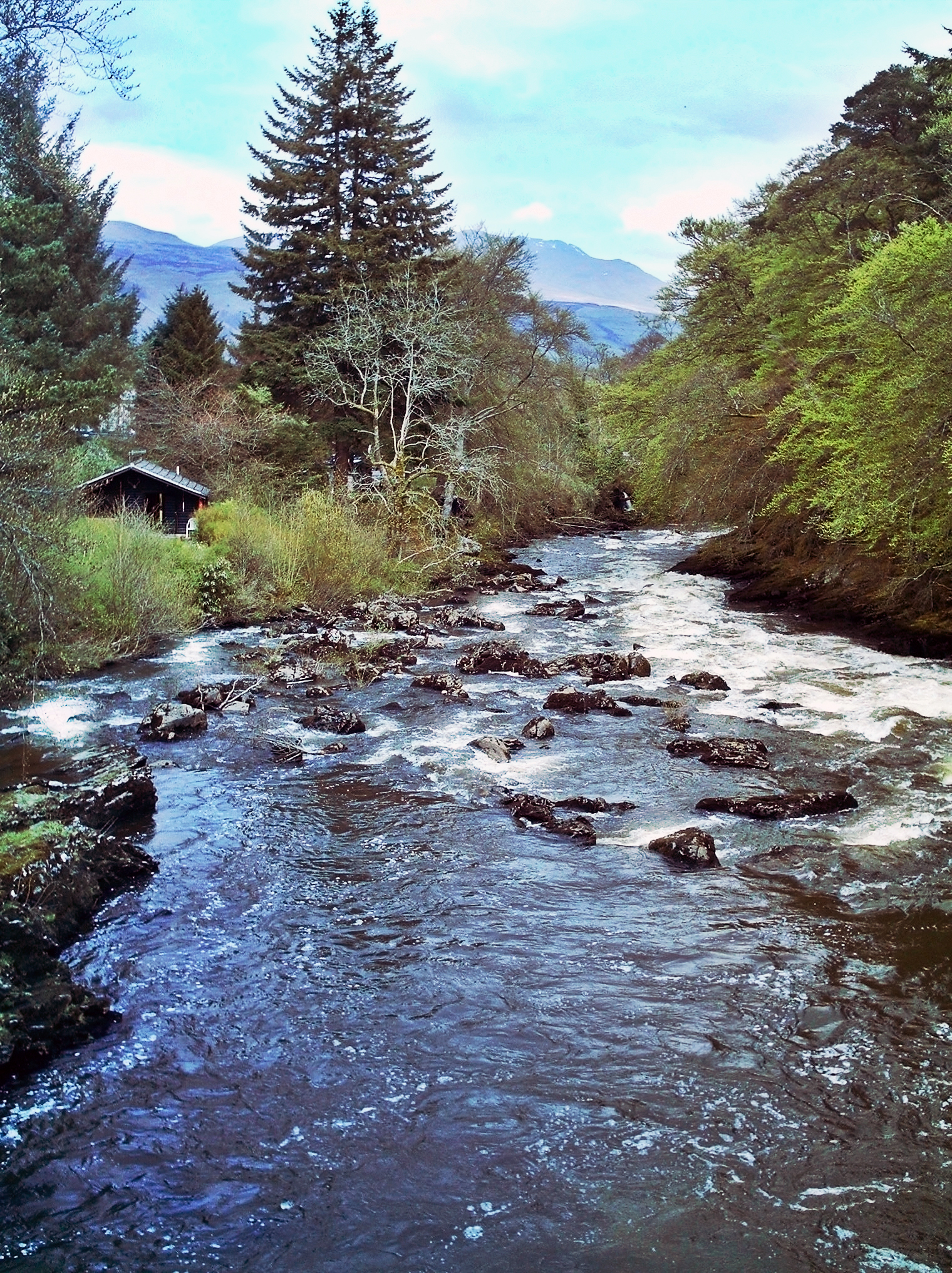
River Dochart

The River Dochart (Scottish Gaelic: Dochard) is in Perthshire, Scotland.

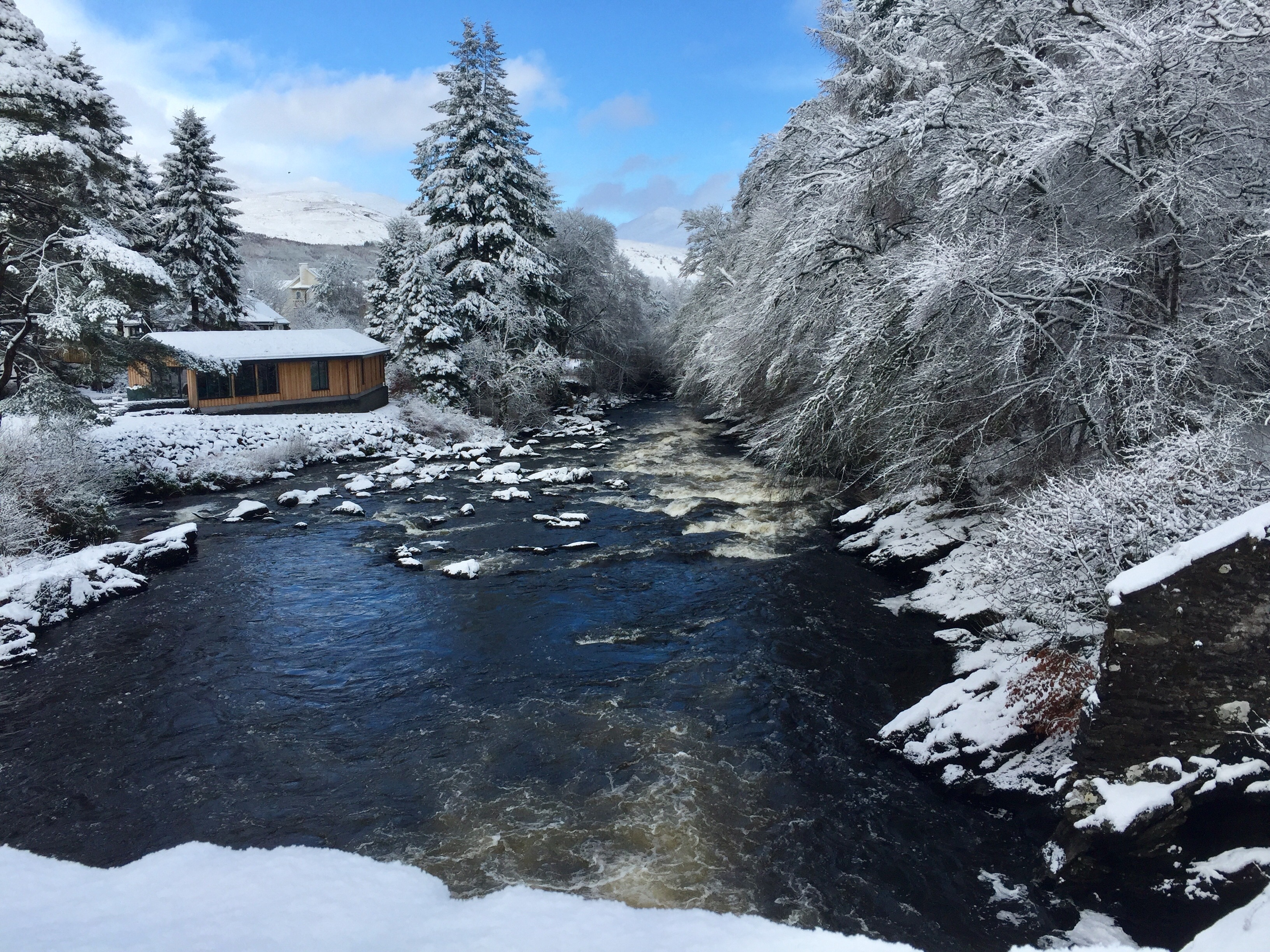
River Dochart in Winter

Coming from Ben Lui, it flows east out of Loch Dochart and through the glen of the same name. At Killin just before it enters Loch Tay are the Falls of Dochart. The river is sometimes also considered to be a part of the upper reaches of the River Tay.

== See also ==
- Inchbuie
