= Loch Langavat =

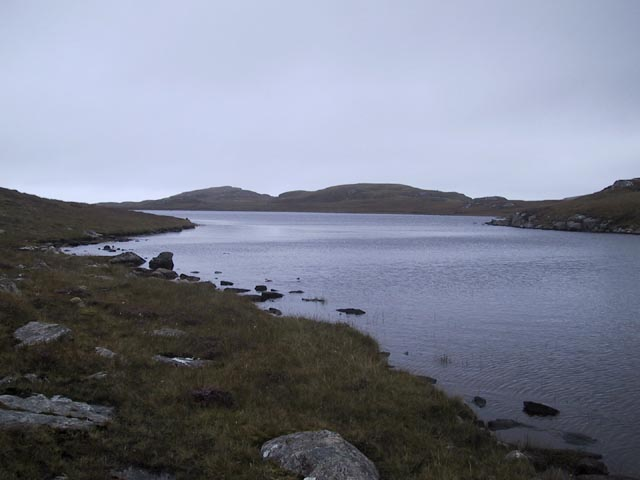
Loch Langavat, to the northeast of Carlabhagh

Loch Langavat (Scottish Gaelic: Langabhat) is the name of several freshwater lochs in the Outer Hebrides of Scotland. The name is a Gaelic rendition of Old Norse lang "long" and vatn, meaning "lake".

Most of these lochs are on the island of Lewis and Harris

1. Loch Langavat (NB525545) is a loch in the Ness district of Lewis. It lies midway between the Butt of Lewis and Tolsta Head, 12 miles (19 km) northeast of Stornoway.
2. Loch Langabhat (NB197205) is the biggest freshwater loch on Lewis. It is over 7 miles long and at the head of the Grimersta system, with spectacular scenery and frequent sightings of golden eagles and red deer. The loch is fished for salmon and brown trout. The loch lies at 33 metres (108 ft) above sea level, its total area is 906.5 hectares (2,240 acres) and its maximum depth 30 metres (98 ft).
3. Loch Langabhat (NB217437) is a small loch north of Carlabhagh, Lewis.
4. Loch Langabhat (NB484445) is a small loch northwest of Gress, Lewis.
5. Loch Langabhat (NB022092) is a loch about 700 m long west of Amhuinnsuidhe, Harris.
6. Loch Langabhat (NG044897) in central Harris is in a steep-sided valley and more than 4 kilometres (2.5 mi) long.

There is another Loch Langabhat on Benbecula at NF827490, which is over 4 kilometres (2.5 mi) long.

According to Sinclair (1890), John Macaulay, known as Iain Ruadh MacDhughaill, "was celebrated as a hunter. He was drowned in Loch Langabhat whilst swimming to an Island in the middle of that lake, an t-Eilaln Dubh. A large stone marks the spot on which his body was laid after it was taken out of the water. His bereaved mother used to visit this spot on almost every Wednesday of the year. He was born about the year 1600." It is not clear which of the Loch Langavats this incident refers to.
