= Eilean Ruairidh Mòr =

Island in Loch Maree, Scotland

Eilean Ruairidh Mòr (Gaelic)
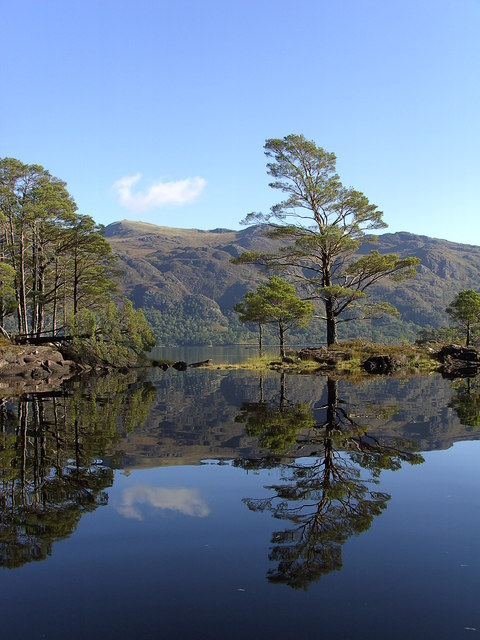

Location
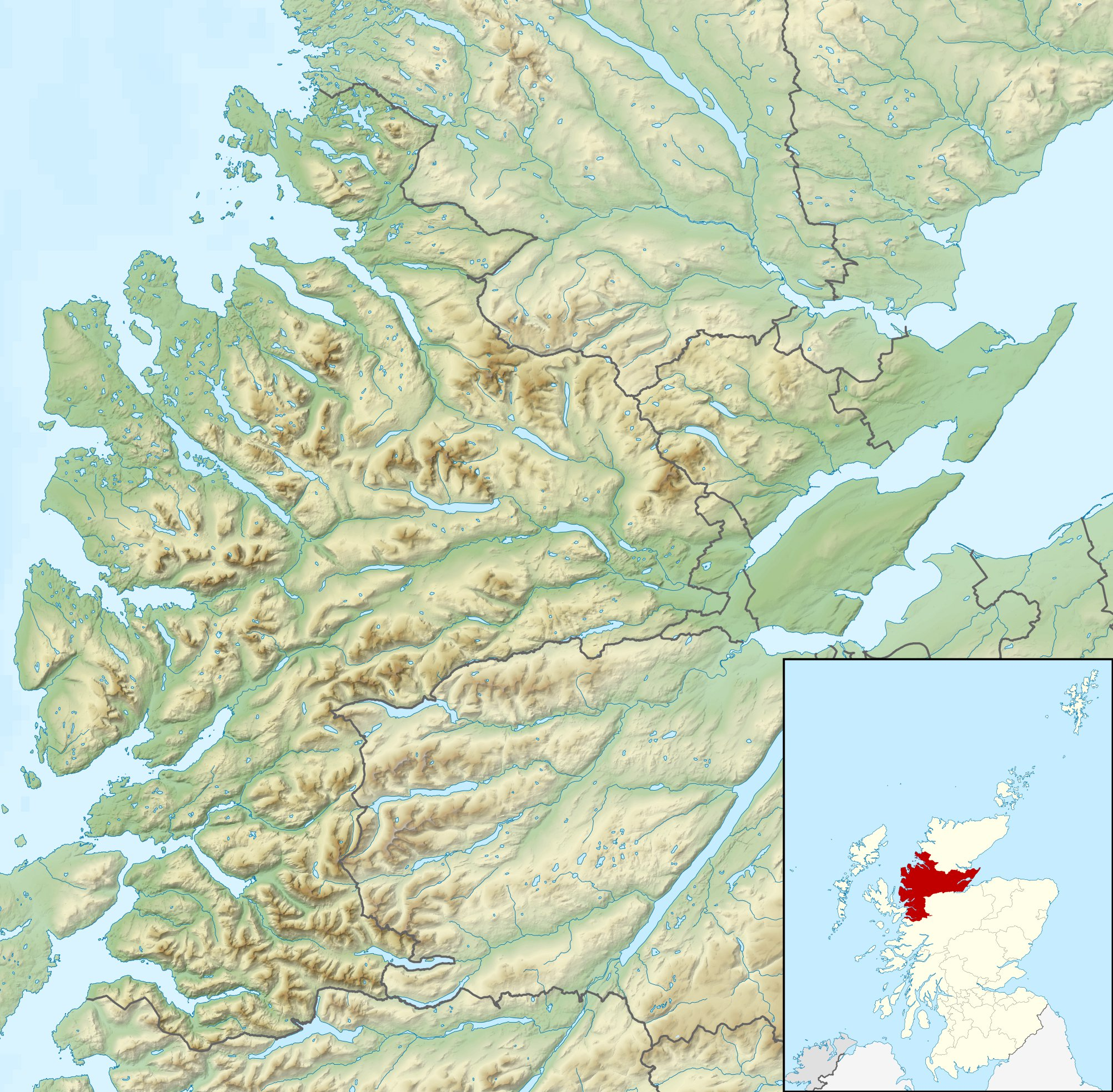
- Location within Ross and Cromarty
- OS grid reference: NG897733
- Coordinates: 57.7°N 5.53°W

Name
- Name meaning: Island of Big Rory/Roderick

Physical geography
- Island group: Loch Maree
- Area: 38 ha
- Area rank: (Freshwater: 10)
- Highest elevation: 51 m (167 ft)

Administration
- Council area: Highland
- Country: Scotland
- Sovereign state: United Kingdom

Demographics
- Population: 0

Eilean Ruairidh Mòr is a forested island in Loch Maree, Wester Ross, Scotland. Its name was formerly anglicised as "Ellan-Rorymore".

The island is owned by Forestry and Land Scotland, as is the Slattadale Forest on the southern shore of Loch Maree. The islands in Loch Maree are among the least disturbed in Britain and are managed as a national nature reserve.

== History ==
Eilean Ruairidh Mòr was planted with pines in about 1815. There are remains of a subterranean circular structure, similar to a Scandinavian dùn or burgh. The ancestors of the Mackenzies of Gairloch held it as a place of security from the attacks of the Macleods.
