= Inchbuie =

Island of the River Dochart in Scotland

Coordinates: 56°27′45″N 4°19′3″W

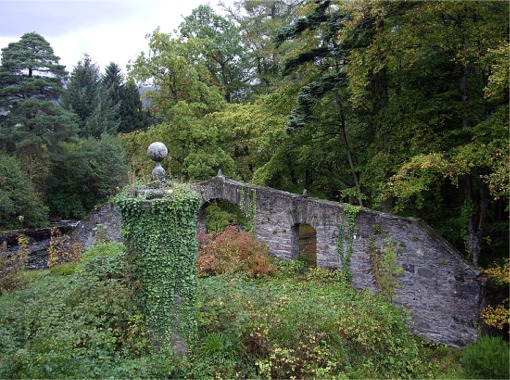
The MacNab burial ground on Inchbuie

Inchbuie (Scottish Gaelic: Innis Bhuidhe, 'yellow island') is an island of the River Dochart, near Killin. A bridge links it with both riverbanks, just below the Falls of Dochart.

The MacNab Clan were once dominant here, and have long been associated with Killin. Their ancient burial ground which is still in use is visible from the bridge. The walled enclosure features two 18th-century naive 'busts' on top of the walls, and the monuments within include a late medieval effigy of a warrior in the West Highland style (one of only two known examples outside Argyll and the Hebrides).
