= Eilean Sùbhainn =

Island in Loch Maree, Scotland

Location
- Eilean Sùbhainn shown within Highland Scotland
- OS grid reference: NG923722
- Coordinates: 57.69°N 5.48°W

Name
- Name meaning: Possibly "island of berries"

Physical geography
- Island group: Loch Maree
- Area: 118 ha (290 acres)
- Area rank: 141 (Freshwater: 2)
- Highest elevation: 36 m (118 ft)

Administration
- Council area: Highland
- Country: Scotland
- Sovereign state: United Kingdom

Demographics
- Population: 0

Eilean Sùbhainn is the largest of several small islands in Loch Maree, Wester Ross, Scotland. It is the second largest freshwater island in Scotland after Inchmurrin.

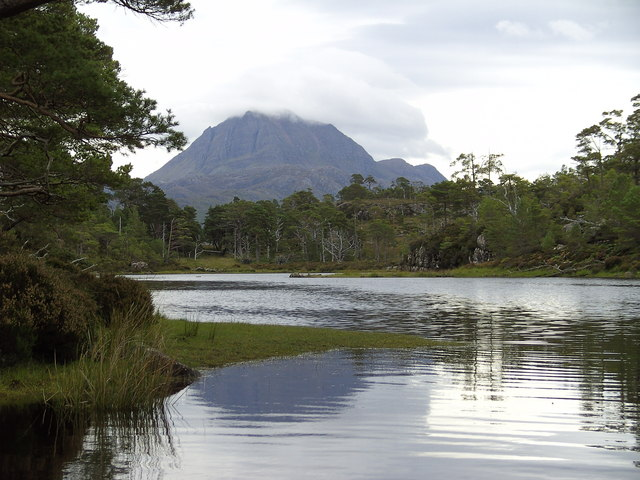
Lochan on Eilean Sùbhainn

Lying 1 mile (1.5 kilometres) northeast of Talladale, the island is partially forested and uninhabited. It rises to 36 metres (118 feet) and extends to 118 hectares (290 acres). The island is a nature reserve and includes several small lochans.
