= Ardery =

Coordinates: 56.69181°N 5.66859°W

- Location within the Lochaber area
- OS grid reference: NM754615
- Council area: Highland
- Country: Scotland
- Sovereign state: United Kingdom
- Postcode district: PH36 4
- Police: Scotland
- Fire: Scottish
- Ambulance: Scottish
- UK Parliament: Ross, Skye and Lochaber
- Scottish Parliament: Skye, Lochaber and Badenoch

Ardery is a village in Acharacle in Lochaber, Argyll, located a quarter mile from the north shore of Loch Sunart in the Highland, and is in the Scottish council area of the Highland Scotland.
