= Eilean Mòr =

Eilean Mòr, literally meaning "large island" in Scottish Gaelic, is the name of several Scottish islands. In some areas, the term merely refers to the large island of a group, and may be used in place of the actual name:

== Saltwater ==
- Eilean Mòr, Cairns of Coll, see Cairns of Coll
- Eilean Mòr, Crowlin Islands in the Crowlin Islands
- Eilean Mòr, Burnt Islands in the Burnt Islands, Firth of Clyde
- Eilean Mòr, Dunstaffnage Bay, see Dunstaffnage Bay
- Eilean Mòr, Loch Dunvegan
- Eilean Mòr, Enard Bay, see Enard Bay
- Eilean Mòr, Flannan Isles
- Eilean Mòr, Loch Fyne, see Loch Fyne
- Eilean Mòr, Gulf of Corryvreckan, see Gulf of Corryvreckan
- Eilean Mòr, Loch Greshornish, see Loch Greshornish
- Eilean Mòr, MacCormaig Isles
- Eilean Mòr, Sandaig Islands, see Sandaig Islands
- Eilean Mòr, Loch Sunart
- Eilean Mòr, Loch Sunart (inner), further inland than the above island, lying south of Ceol na Mara

== Freshwater ==
- Eilean Mòr, Loch Finlaggan, a freshwater loch on Islay
- Eilean Mòr, Loch Gorm, the location of Loch Gorm Castle, Islay
- Eilean Mòr, Loch Langavat, Lewis
- Eilean Mòr, Loch Sionascaig, see Loch Sionascaig
- Rainish Eilean Mòr, Lewis

== See also ==
- Eilean Dubh Mòr in the Firth of Lorn
- Eilean Ruairidh Mòr in Loch Maree
