= Soa, Tiree =

Tidal island off the coast of Tiree, Scotland

Soa
Sòthaigh (Gaelic)
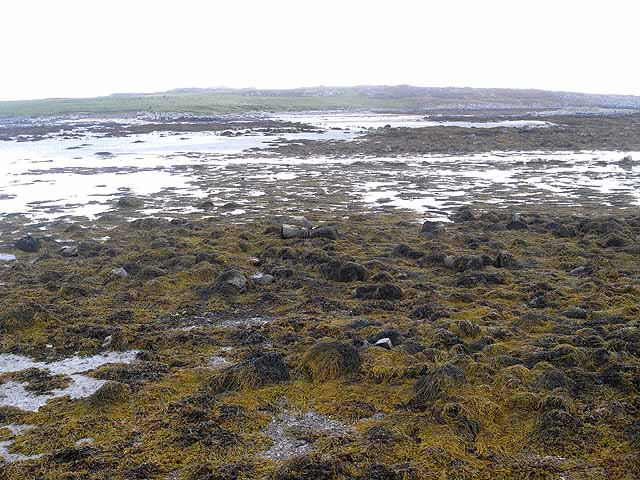

Location
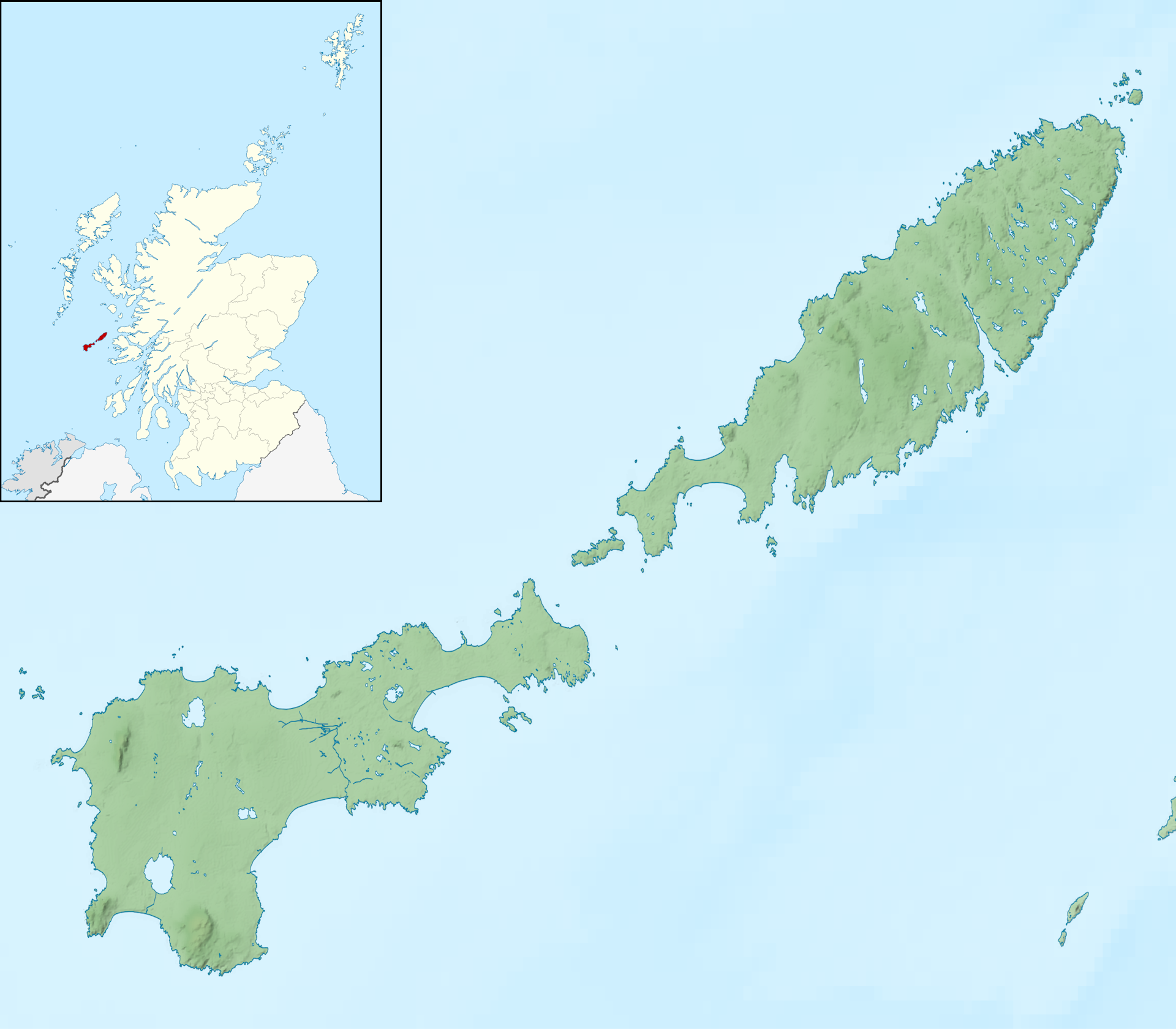
- Soa shown next to Coll and tiree Soa shown within Argyll and Bute
- Coordinates: 56.516369°N 6.7645097°W

Name
- Name meaning: Sheep island

Physical geography
- Area: 24 hectares (0.09 sq mi)
- Highest elevation: 12 m (39 ft)

Administration
- Council area: Argyll and Bute
- Country: Scotland
- Sovereign state: United Kingdom

Demographics
- Population: 0

Soa (Scottish Gaelic: Sòthaigh) is an uninhabited tidal island off the coast of Tiree, to the south of the settlement of Ruaig.

At low tide it is joined to mainland Tiree by a sand tombolo and numerous rocky outcrops. The largest of the rock platforms, Carsamull is itself a little island at high tide.

Soa is not populated and probably never was on a permanent basis, but a former building has been identified on the south-eastern limb (Eilean an Triogh)

There is also a track which runs along the northern coast of Soa.

Statistics: (Areas calculated based MHWS contour using Magic.defra)

Soa - Area 24.9 hectares (62 acres) - High point c.12m (40')

Carsamull - Area 2.1 hectares (5.2 acres) (only rises to a few metres/feet)

At low tide the area of rocky land separated from the mainland by sand and incorporating Soa, Carsamull and other rocky outcrops more than doubles to c. 58 hectares (140 acres)

== History ==
The name "Soa" is Old Norse and means "sheep island".
