= Ardmenish =

Coordinates: 55.8985°N 5.8867°W

Ardmenish: Scottish Gaelic: Àird Mhèanais
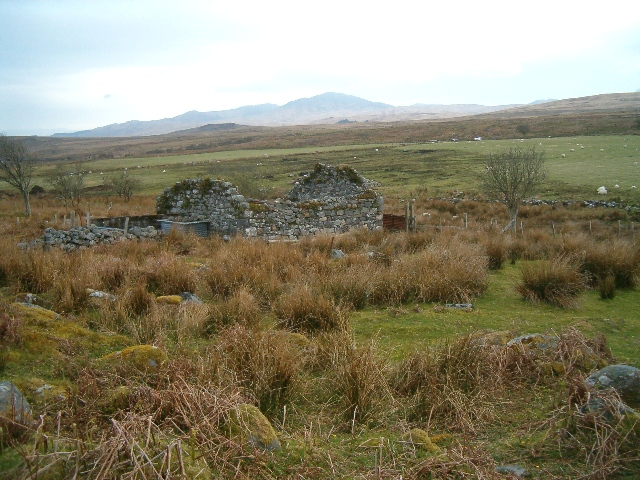
- The ruins of a farmhouse at Ardmenish

- Location within Argyll and Bute
- OS grid reference: NR5773
- Council area: Argyll and Bute
- Country: Scotland
- Sovereign state: United Kingdom
- Police: Scotland
- Fire: Scottish
- Ambulance: Scottish

Ardmenish (Scottish Gaelic: Àird Mhèanais) is a largely cleared village on the island of Jura, in Argyll and Bute, Scotland. In 2003 the Rozga family were the sole inhabitants of Ardmenish.

== History ==
The name "Ardmenish" means "The headland of the narrow point" which is Gaelic/Norse.
