= Achinhoan =

Coordinates: 55°23′45″N 5°32′19″W

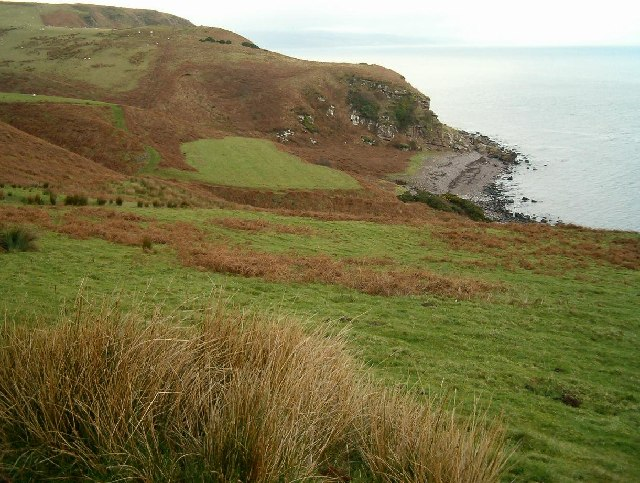
The shoreline near Achinhoan

Achinhoan is a settlement on the Kintyre Peninsula in Argyll and Bute, west of Scotland. It consists of a handful of buildings, half a mile (one km) west of Achinhoan Head and three miles (five km) southeast of Campbeltown.
