= Lussa Loch =

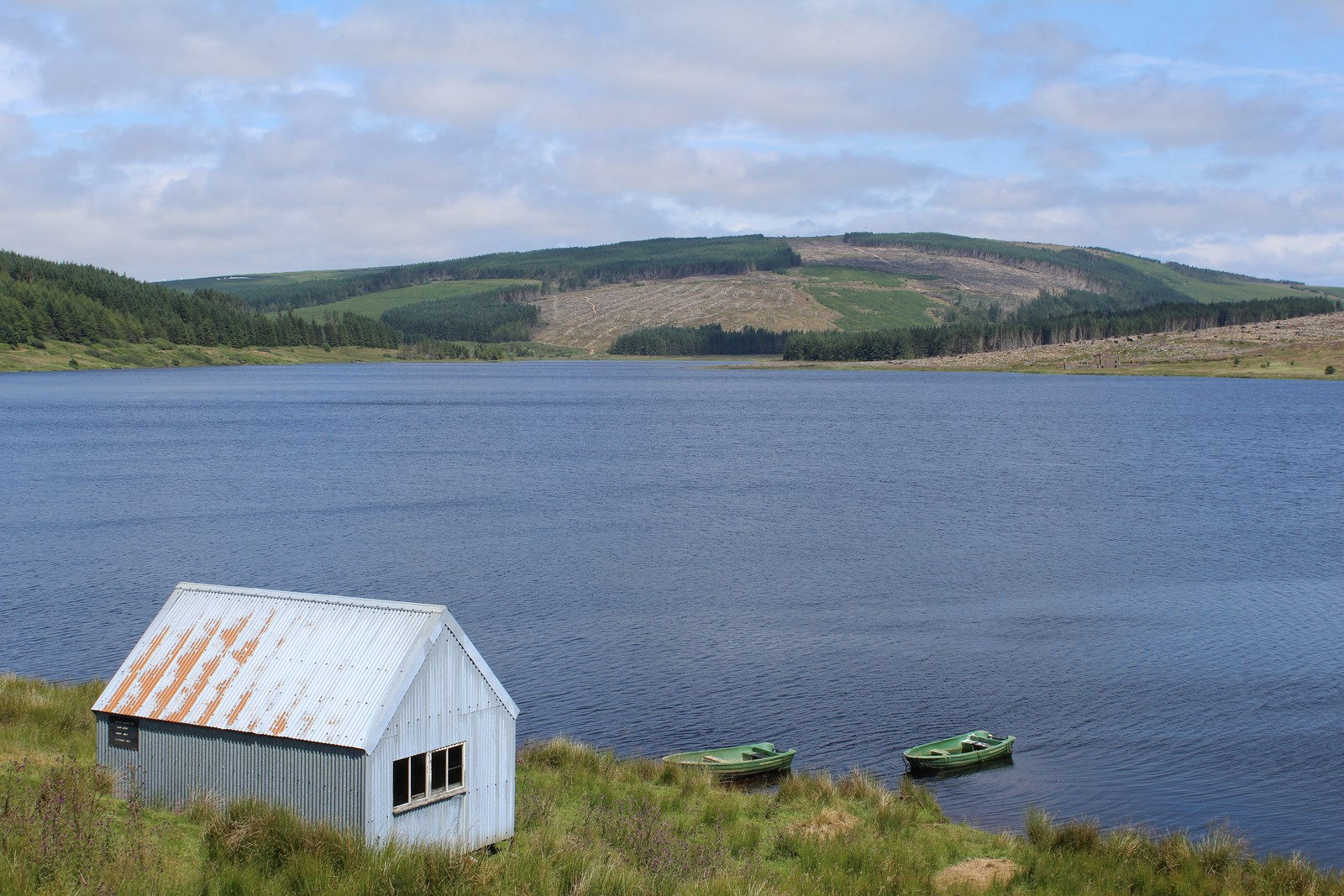
- Lussa Loch from its western shore

- Location within Argyll and Bute
- Location: Scottish Highlands
- Coordinates: 55°30′43″N 5°37′41″W
- Primary inflows: Strathduie Water
- Primary outflows: Glenlussa Water
- Basin countries: Scotland, United Kingdom
- Max. length: 2.66 km (1.65 mi)
- Max. width: 757 m (2,484 ft)
- Surface elevation: 134 m (440 ft)

Lussa Loch is an artificial reservoir in Kintyre, Scotland, roughly 8 km north of Campbeltown.

It was constructed between 1947 and 1956 by damming the Strathduie Water, as part of a larger hydroelectric scheme in Kintyre. The damming submerged one farm (Gobagrennan), and caused another (Stramollach) to be abandoned.

The loch's name may derive from the same Scottish Gaelic root as the village of Luss in Argyll and Bute, luibh meaning "herb".

Loch Lussa has a large stock of brown and rainbow trout, and Kintyre Angling Club holds angling competitions on the loch.

The Kintyre Way runs along a small road on the loch's western shore.
