= Loch Doilet =

Loch in Lochaber Scotland

- Loch Doilet on a hazy summers day

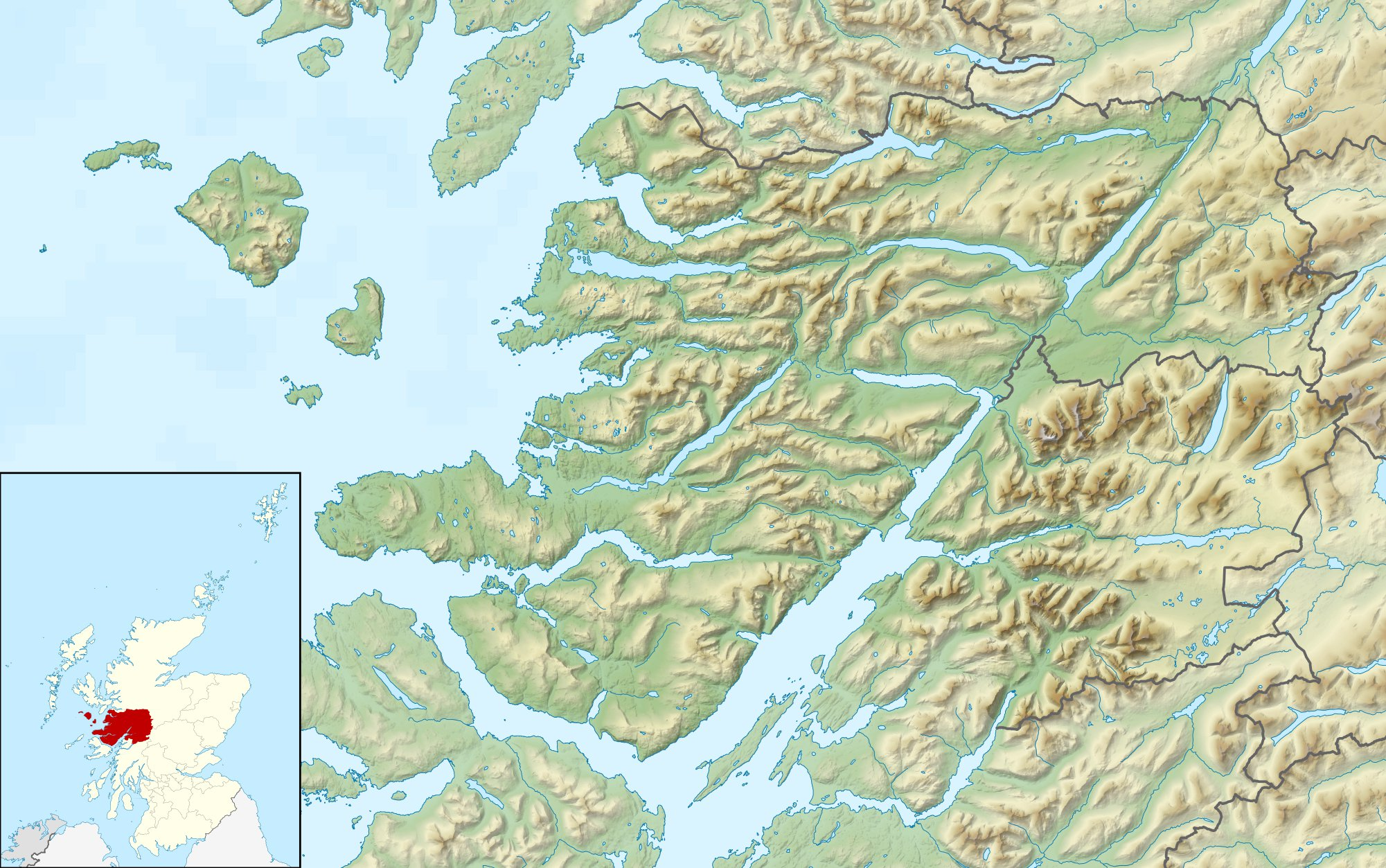
- Location in Lochaber
- Location: NM80716770
- Coordinates: 56.7491°N 5.5899°W
- Type: freshwater loch
- Basin countries: Scotland
- Max. length: 2.4 km (1.5 mi)
- Max. width: 0.25 km (0.16 mi)
- Surface area: 39 ha (96 acres)
- Average depth: 23.6 ft (7.2 m)
- Max. depth: 55.118 ft (16.800 m)
- Water volume: 134,057,476.6 ft^{3} (3,796,085.00 m^{3})
- Shore length^{1}: 5 km (3.1 mi)
- Surface elevation: 8 m (26 ft)
- Max. temperature: 62.3 °F (16.8 °C) at 0 feet.
- Min. temperature: 54.3 °F (12.4 °C) at 40 feet.
- ^{1} Shore length is not a well-defined measure.

Loch Doilet is a small remote freshwater loch that is orientated north-west to south-east that is situated about 1.5 miles south-east of the east lower portion of Loch Shiel in east Ardnamurchan, Lochaber, Highland, Scotland. The loch is drained by the River Polloch into Loch Schiel.
