= Eilean Mòr, Loch Sunart =

Scotland uninhabited tidal island

Eilean Mòr
Location
- Eilean Mòr shown within Highland
- OS grid reference: NM587612
- Coordinates: 56.68054°N 5.940381°W

Name
- Name meaning: large island

Physical geography
- Island group: Inner Hebrides
- Area: 28 hectares (0.11 sq mi)
- Highest elevation: 37 metres (121 ft)

Administration
- Council area: Highland
- Country: Scotland
- Sovereign state: United Kingdom

Demographics
- Population: 0

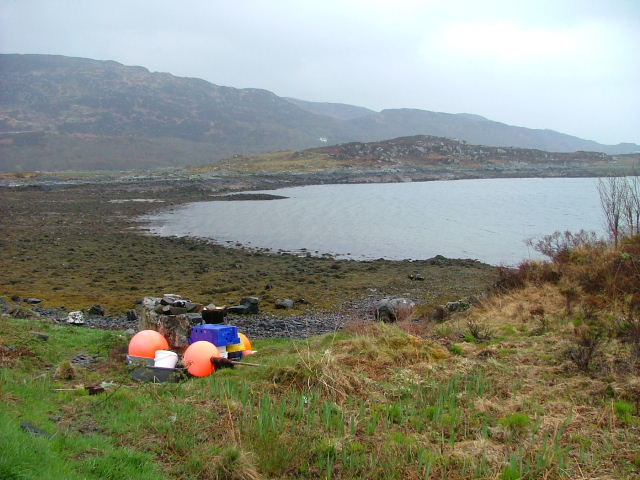
View of Port na Croisg on Loch Sunart

Eilean Mòr is an uninhabited, tidal island opposite Oronsay at the entrance to Loch Sunart, an arm of the sea on the west coast of Scotland. At low tide it is attached to Glenmore on the Ardnamurchan peninsula. The highest elevation is 123 feet (37 m). At low tide it is attached to Glenmore on the Ardnamurchan peninsula. The water around Eilean Mòr contains flame shells.
