= Lochan na Stainge =

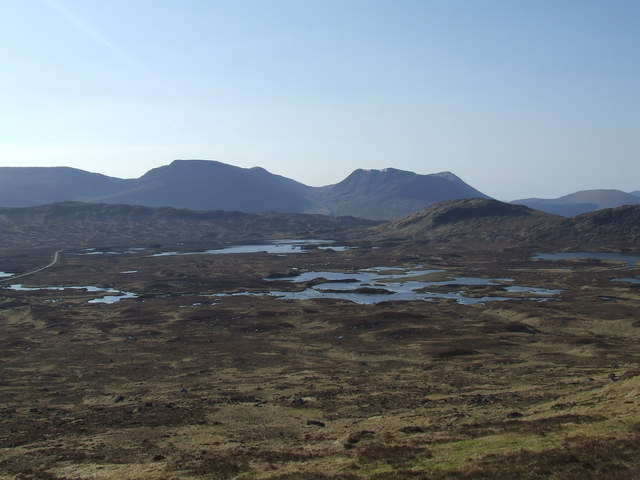
- Lochan na Stainge

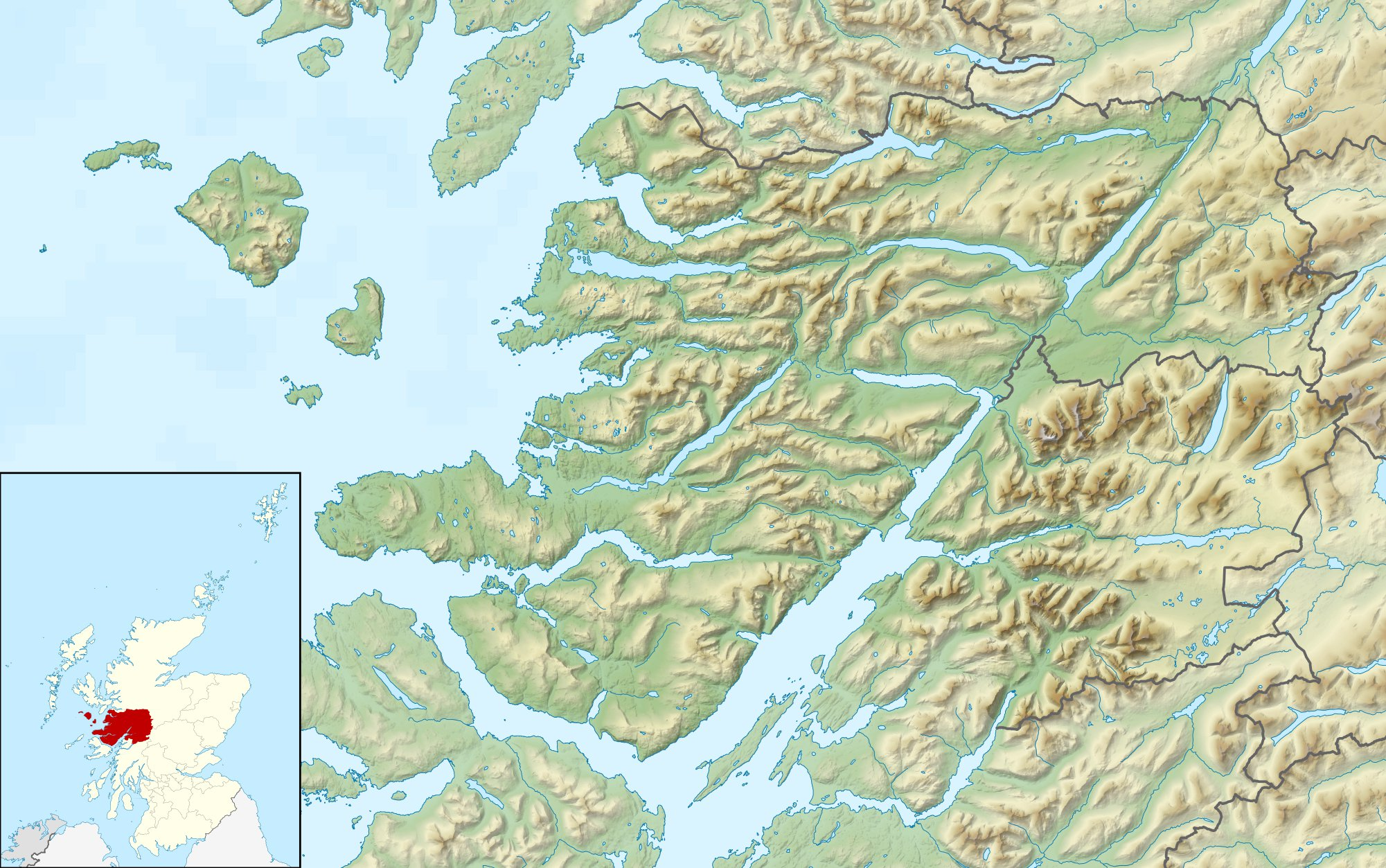
- Location within Lochaber
- Location: NN302491
- Coordinates: 56.6037°N 4.7675°W
- Type: freshwater loch
- Primary inflows: River Bà
- Primary outflows: River Bà
- Max. length: 0.804 km (0.500 mi)
- Max. width: 0.643 km (0.400 mi)
- Surface area: 23.6 ha (58 acres)
- Average depth: 5 ft (1.5 m)
- Max. depth: 14 ft (4.3 m)
- Shore length^{1}: 7.2 km (4.5 mi)
- Surface elevation: 296 m (971 ft)
- ^{1} Shore length is not a well-defined measure.

Lochan na Stainge is a fresh water loch on Rannoch Moor, Argyll and Bute within Highland council area, Scotland.
