= Tullochgorm =

- Township
- Tullochgorm
- Coordinates: 56.106911°N 5.267944°W
- Country: Scotland
- Lieutenancy: Argyll and Bute

Tullochgorm is an old township parish which lies one mile south of Minard in the county of Argyll and Bute in Western Scotland and today comprises only six inhabited cottages.

The parish originally supported more scattered hillside crofts; these gradually fell into disuse during the Highland Clearances and the closure of the timber mill on the Minard Estate at the turn of the 19th century. Some of the original dwellings, in ruins, were absorbed by forestation by the Forestry Commission. Smithy Cottage is the oldest remaining inhabited dwelling. During its time it served as the blacksmith's house (the old blacksmiths forge remains as a ruin), the village school, and as a post office.
