= Newton of Ardtoe =

Coordinates: 56.76768°N 5.84979°W

- Location within the Lochaber area
- OS grid reference: NM648706
- Council area: Highland
- Country: Scotland
- Sovereign state: United Kingdom
- Post town: Newton
- Postcode district: PH36 4
- Police: Scotland
- Fire: Scottish
- Ambulance: Scottish

Newton of Ardtoe is a scattered crofting hamlet near Acharacle in Lochaber, Scottish Highlands and is in the council area of Highland.
