= Loch Achtriochtan =

Loch in the highlands of Scotland

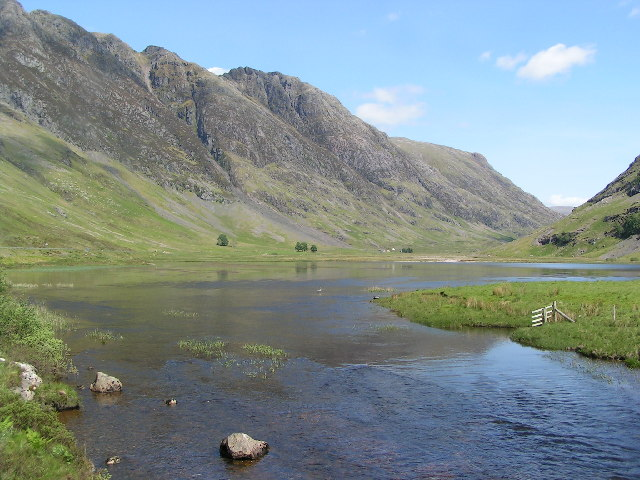
- A loch with a wide stream flowing towards the camera, and steep mountainsides

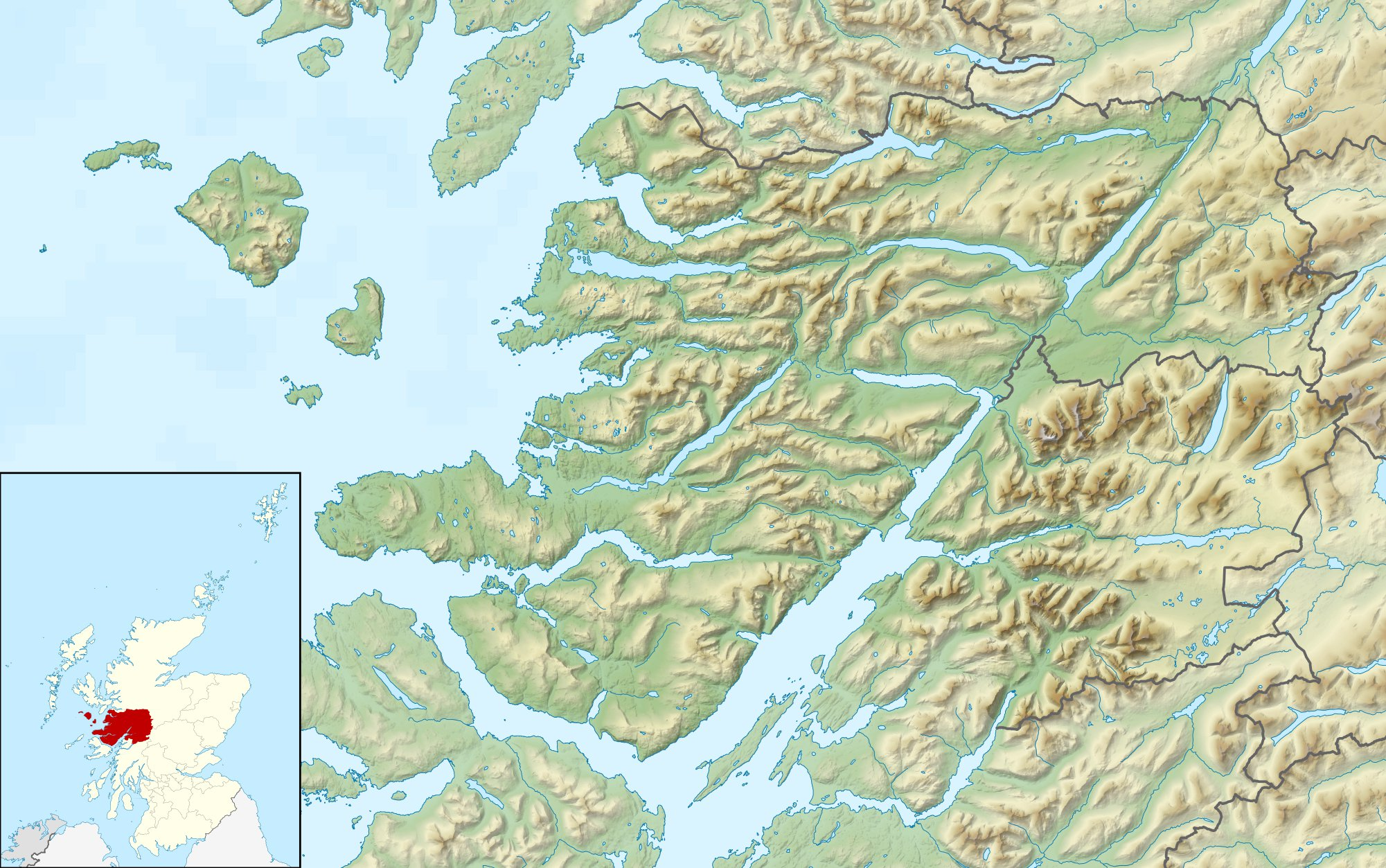
- Location in Lochaber
- Location: Near Glencoe, Highland, Scotland
- Coordinates: 56.6654°N 5.0336°W
- Type: Freshwater loch
- Primary inflows: River Coe
- Primary outflows: River Coe
- Catchment area: 2,576 hectares (6,370 acres)
- Max. length: 0.32 km (0.20 mi)
- Max. width: 0.28 km (0.17 mi)
- Surface area: 15 ha (37 acres)
- Average depth: 15.7 ft (4.8 m)
- Water volume: 24,060,518.1 ft^{3} (681,318.00 m^{3})
- Shore length^{1}: 2 km (1.2 mi)
- Surface elevation: 86 m (282 ft)
- Islands: 0
- ^{1} Shore length is not a well-defined measure.

Loch Achtriochtan or Loch Trychardan is a small shallow freshwater loch located to the east of Glencoe village in Lochaber in the Scottish Highlands. It is now under the care of the National Trust for Scotland. During the 18th century, the loch flooded and nearby inhabitants had to abandon the area.

== Topography ==
Loch Achtriochtan is a small fresh water lochan in Glencoe, fed by the River Coe, which eventually flows into Loch Leven at Invercoe. It is considered relatively oligotrophic. To the south of the Loch is Achnambeithach Cottage, accessible from the A82 road. To the north, there are the mountains Sgorr nam Fiannaidh and Stob Coire Leith and, to the south, the Three Sisters. Loch Actriochtan sits about three miles from Glencoe village.

== See also ==
- Glen Coe
- Glencoe, Highland
- Three Sisters (Glen Coe)
