= Ardilistry =

Settlement in Argyll and Bute, Scotland

Coordinates: 55.66°N 06.09°W

- Location within Argyll and Bute
- OS grid reference: NR425489
- Council area: Argyll and Bute
- Country: Scotland
- Sovereign state: United Kingdom
- Police: Scotland
- Fire: Scottish
- Ambulance: Scottish
- UK Parliament: Argyll, Bute and South Lochaber
- Scottish Parliament: Argyll and Bute

Ardilistry is a settlement in Argyll and Bute, Scotland.

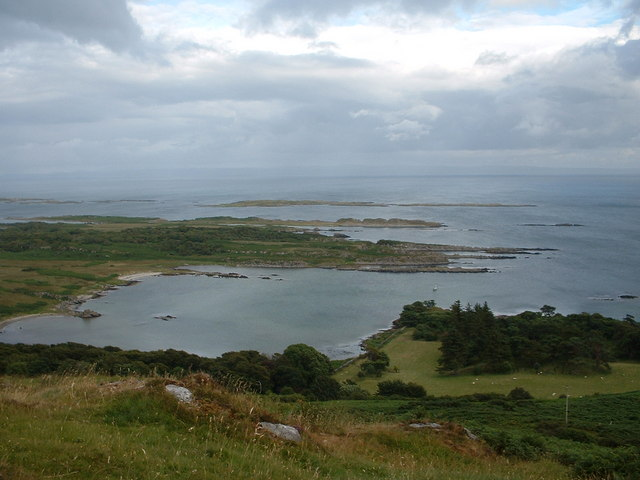
Ardilistry Bay from Cnoc Rhaonastil
