= Duisky =

Coordinates: 56.84013°N 5.26225°W

Duisky: Scottish Gaelic: Dubh-uisge
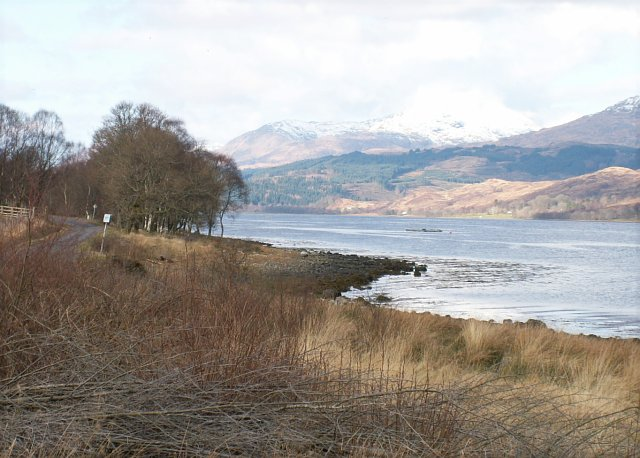
- Loch Eil, looking west near Duisky

- Location within the Lochaber area
- OS grid reference: NN011768
- Council area: Highland
- Country: Scotland
- Sovereign state: United Kingdom
- Post town: Fort William
- Postcode district: PH33 7
- Police: Scotland
- Fire: Scottish
- Ambulance: Scottish

Duisky (Scottish Gaelic: Dubh-uisge – "black water", referring to the dark appearance of Loch Eil) is a small hamlet on the south shore of Loch Eil, directly across from Fassfern, and approximately six miles (ten kilometres) west of Fort William on the south shore of Loch Eil, Lochaber, Scottish Highlands and is in the Scottish council area of Highland.
