= Loch Dochard =

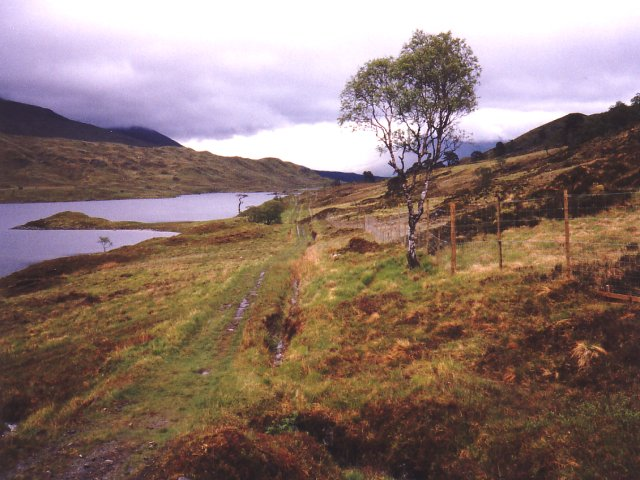

- Location within Argyll and Bute
- Location: Argyll and Bute, Scotland
- Coordinates: 56.5358°N 4.9074°W
- Type: freshwater loch
- Basin countries: Scotland
- Max. length: 1.06 km (0.66 mi)
- Max. width: 0.48 km (0.3 mi)
- Surface area: 35.9 ha (89 acres)
- Average depth: 3.7 m (12 ft)
- Max. depth: 13 m (42 ft)
- Water volume: 1,500,000 m^{3} (54,000,000 ft^{3})
- Shore length^{1}: 5.7 km (3.5 mi)
- Surface elevation: 221 m (725 ft)
- Islands: 1
- ^{1} Shore length is not a well-defined measure.

Loch Dochard is an upland freshwater loch lying approximately 6 km (3.7 mi) west of Bridge of Orchy in Argyll and Bute, Scottish Highlands. The loch has an irregular shape with a perimeter of 3 km (1.9 mi). It is approximately 1.06 km (0.66 mi) long, has an average depth of 3.7 m (12 ft) and is 13 m (42 ft) at its deepest. The loch was surveyed on 18 May 1903 by Sir John Murray and later charted as part of his Bathymetrical Survey of Fresh-Water Lochs of Scotland 1897-1909.
