= Barmore Island =

Peninsula in Scotland

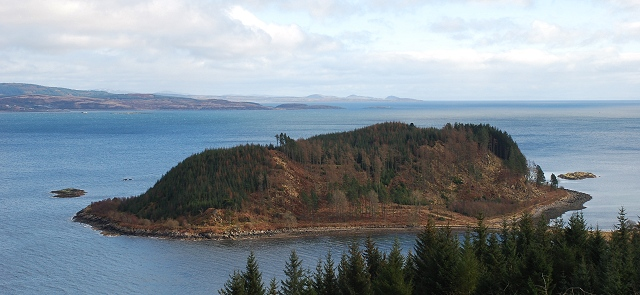
- Interactive map of Barmore Island

Geography
- Location: Loch Fyne
- Coordinates: 55.890°N 5.408°W

Administration
- Scotland

Barmore Island is a peninsula in Scotland located on the east of Knapdale, in the council area of Argyll and Bute. It is 1 and a half miles north from Tarbert.

The peninsula is attached to the main land by a narrow strip.

== Shipwrecks ==
The PS Chevaliar wrecked here in the year 1927.

The ship Nancy Glen is thought to have wrecked 400 feet near Barmore Island.
