= Oronsay, Loch Sunart =

Island in Scotland

Oronsay
Orasaigh (Gaelic)

Location
- Oronsay shown within Highland Scotland
- OS grid reference: NM591592
- Coordinates: 56.66°N 5.93°W

Name
- Name meaning: tidal island (Norse via Gaelic)
- Old Norse name: Örfirirsey

Physical geography
- Island group: Inner Hebrides
- Area: 240 hectares (0.93 sq mi)
- Area rank: 99=
- Highest elevation: 58 metres (190 ft)

Administration
- Council area: Highland
- Country: Scotland
- Sovereign state: United Kingdom

Demographics
- Population: 0

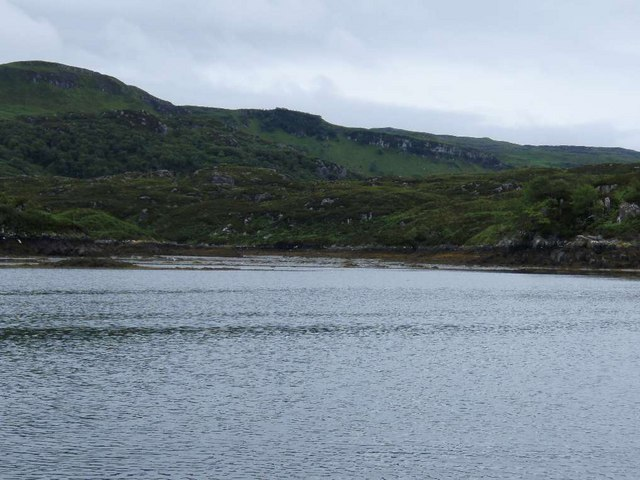
Oronsay from southern end of Sàilean Mòr

Oronsay is an uninhabited island in Loch Sunart, Scotland.

It is low-lying, barren and rocky, deeply indented with sea lochs.

The island encloses Loch Drumbuie (Scottish Gaelic: Loch na Droma Buidhe), a popular anchorage for yachts and a temporary home to fish farm cages.
