= Kilmory, Ardnamurchan =

Coordinates: 56.756°N 6.043°W

Kilmory: Scottish Gaelic: Cill Mhoire
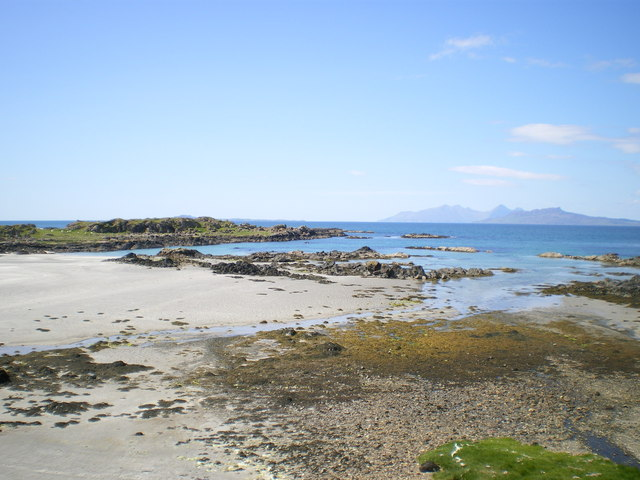
- Kilmory beach

- Location within the Lochaber area
- OS grid reference: NM529700
- Council area: Highland
- Country: Scotland
- Sovereign state: United Kingdom
- Post town: ACHARACLE
- Postcode district: PH36
- Police: Scotland
- Fire: Scottish
- Ambulance: Scottish

Kilmory (Cill Mhoire in Gaelic "Church of Mary") is a small crofting (township) hamlet on the north coast of Ardnamurchan, western Scotland.

== Geography ==
Kilmory is reached by a branch road off the B8007 road that runs from Salen to Achosnich by way of Kilchoan. All the roads in Ardnamurchan are single track. There is a view north from the junction with the B8007 to the islands of Rùm, Eigg, Muck and Canna. The road descends northwards, crosses the Achateny Water that drains Loch Mudle, passes through Branault and on to Kilmory, Swordle and Ockle. The branch road that enters Kilmory continues to its end at Balnaha Croft.

A rough track (access on foot only) leads to very beautiful, wild and unspoilt Kilmory Bay, a sheltered bay with clear water, white sands and black, volcanic rock. It is one of the few sandy beaches on Ardnamurchan.

Kilmory is overlooked by Dun Mhurchaidh (grid reference NM354706).

== Archaeology ==
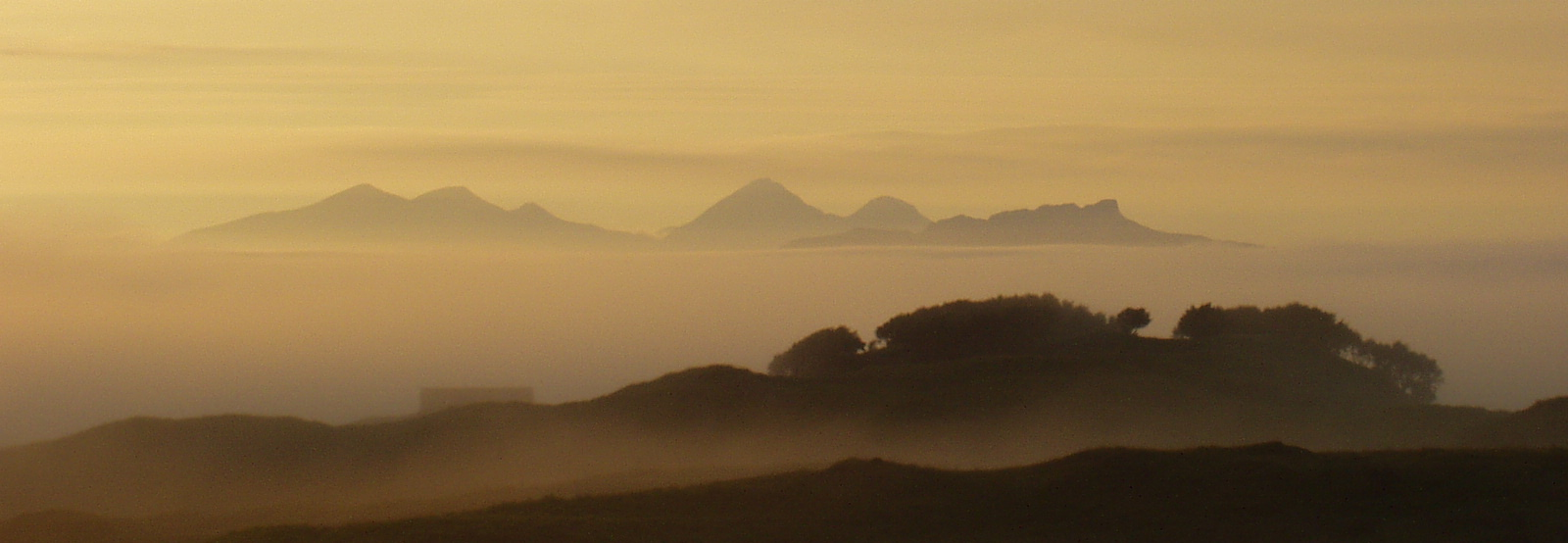
Looking north from Kilnory over Eigg and Rhum

A prominent feature in Kilmory is the graveyard. This is said to be the site of the original "Church of Mary", and it is suggested that outlines visible under the grass are part of that structure. Also lying in the grass near the centre of the graveyard is a stone said to be the font stone from the original church. Locally tradition has it that this stone never dries. The graveyard is surrounded by largely circular dry stone wall.

There is a Standing Stone in the field behind Branault. (NM526695) Whilst the age and significance of this stone are unknown it aligns, almost perfectly, with Ben Hiant to the SSE (528m, NM537632, the highest point in Western Ardnamurchan) and Sgurr Dearg (986m, NG443215) to the NNW, the high point at the western end of the Skye Cuillin.

== Demographics ==
Like many other communities in remote parts of Scotland, the population of Kilmory has experienced a decline. Kilmory/Branault consists of twenty houses, out of which ten are occupied by a population of thirteen throughout the year as of January 2009. The remaining ten houses are utilized as holiday homes. The average age of the residents is 68 years, with the youngest individual being 46 years old.

== Services ==
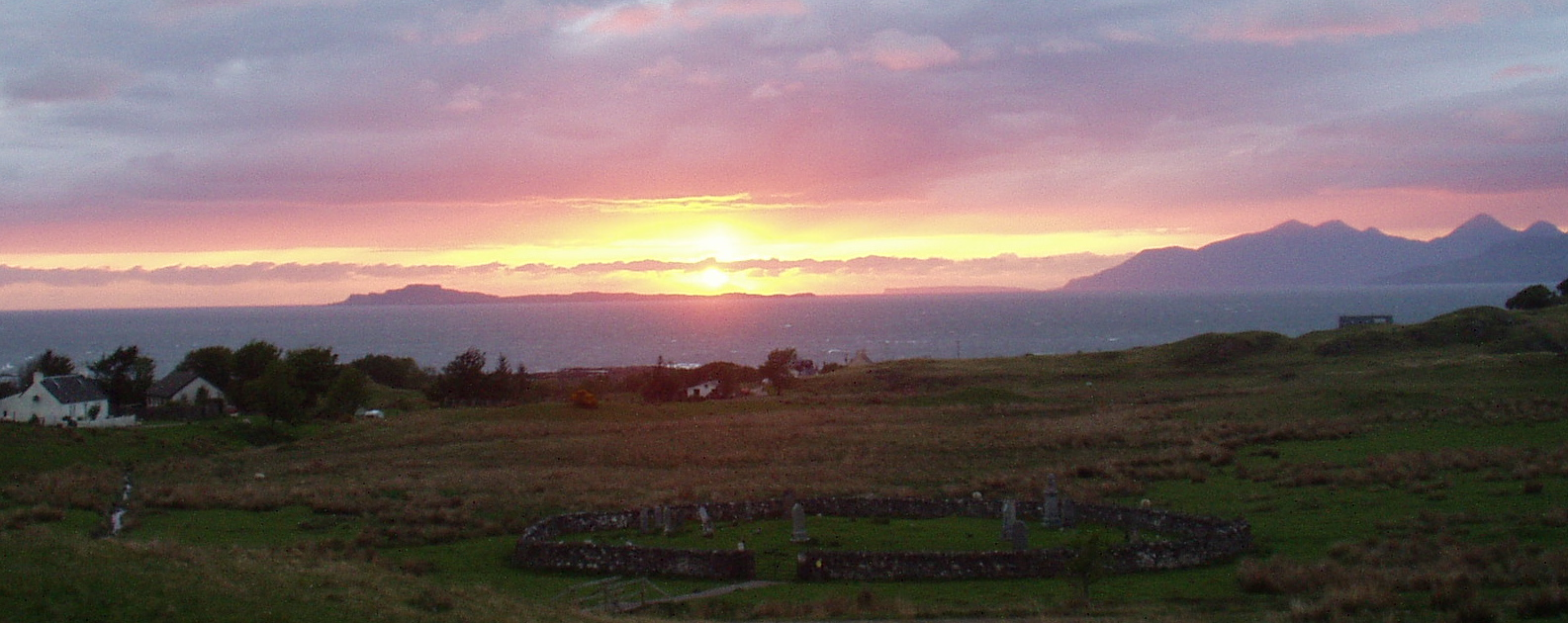
Looking northwest from Kilmory over the Isle of Muck

This decline has been mirrored by a steady decrease in services. In the early part of the 20th century, there was a shop in Branault (Mathieson) and one in Kilmory; up until the 1970s there were weekly visits by two grocery vans(mobile shops)(Burgess from Kilchoan and McColl from Acharacle) as well as the Tuesday butcher's van (Cameron from Acharacle) and the Thursday butcher's van (Connel from Salen).

In 2008 British Telecom threatened to withdraw the service from the one telephone box. June 2017, the phone was removed but then, in February 2018, reinstated on appeal. In August 2018, British Telecom still had not re-connected the telephone. It is also reported in 2017 that it is taking over a year to get a telephone "landline" installed. As of July 2024 this telephone has still not been connected, although local residents have re-painted the telephone box.

Mobile phone reception in Kilmory is very poor as is the terrestrial television signal. In 2019 it has become possible to pick up a 4G signal in isolated spots around Kilmory.

There are neither mains water nor mains drains in Kilmory.

Internet access in Kilmory is difficult, even in 2017. There is no cable service; Kilmory is too far from the exchange to get Broadband through the phone line and the very very patchy mobile signal only offers a very slow GPRS signal, sometimes. A number of houses in Kilmory have installed satellite broadband systems. In 2019 Sunart Telecom, a locally based company, introduced a wireless broadband service. Some households have replaced their satellite services with the wireless broadband.

Kilmory school closed in 1962 and the sub post office was closed in 2004.

There was a notice board in Kilmory which usually lists the times of the Kilchoan-Tobermory ferry, but this fell into disrepair in Autumn 2023 and has not been replaced.

== Religion ==
Kilmory supported two churches. Members of the Free Church of Scotland worshipped in a wooden building set amongst trees to the east of the village whilst members of the Church of Scotland worshipped in Kilmory Church which stands to the south of the village; services ceased here in 1989.

== Development Issues ==
In 2009 and 2010 there has been talk of up to four new houses being built in Kilmory. One of these projects was abandoned as access was too difficult: progress on two others is delayed as there have been problems securing a reliable water supply. The spring from which most of the existing dwellings are provided with water has been deemed to not have sufficient flow to sustain the additional houses.
