= Kentra =

Coordinates: 56.74962°N 5.8231°W

Kentra: Scottish Gaelic: Ceann Tràgha
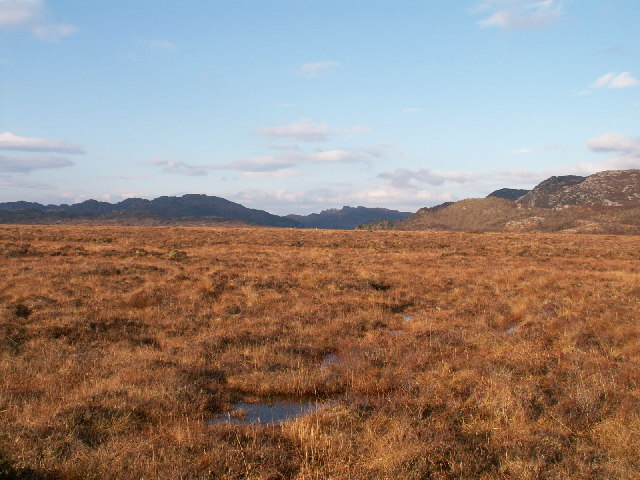
- Kentra Moss near Kentra. Kentra Moss looking north. Very flat.

- Location within the Lochaber area
- Population: 25 (2011)
- OS grid reference: NM663685
- Council area: Highland
- Country: Scotland
- Sovereign state: United Kingdom
- Post town: Acharacle
- Postcode district: PH36 4
- Police: Scotland
- Fire: Scottish
- Ambulance: Scottish

Kentra is a hamlet overlooking the east coast of Kentra Bay, on the north east end of the Ardnamurchan peninsula near Acharacle, Scottish Highlands. It is in the Scottish council area of Highland.

The small hamlet of Ardtoe is located 1 mile northwest along the B8044 road and is accessible from the A861 road from the east at Acharacle.

== See also ==
- Claish Moss
