= Achateny =

Coordinates: 56.755556°N 6.045000°W

Achateny: Scottish Gaelic: Ach an Teine
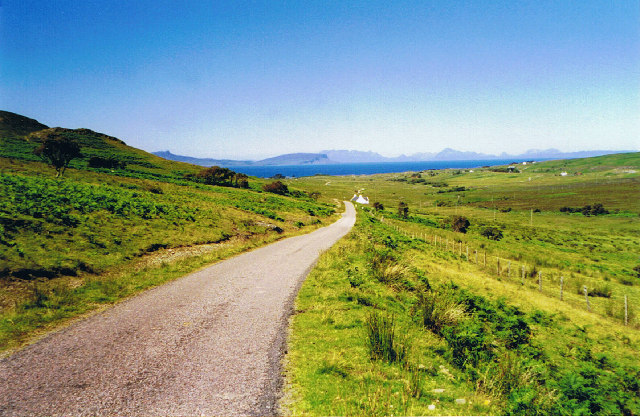
- Near Achateny

- Location within the Lochaber area
- OS grid reference: NM520700
- Council area: Highland
- Country: Scotland
- Sovereign state: United Kingdom
- Postcode district: PH36 4
- Police: Scotland
- Fire: Scottish
- Ambulance: Scottish
- UK Parliament: Ross, Skye and Lochaber
- Scottish Parliament: Skye, Lochaber and Badenoch

Achateny (Scottish Gaelic: Ach/Achadh an Teine) is a hamlet in Argyll on Ardnamurchan in the Scottish Highlands. It is in the Scottish council area of the Highland, near Branault, along a country lane off the B8007 road several hundred metres from the coast. To the east lies the village of Kilmory.

Trees in the area include typical highland birch wood, oaks and rowans and a damp rocky and mossy substrate supporting ferns. Shell sand is also present Achateny with sand dunes. The low-lying land to the west of Achateny is bog. The hamlet contains nothing more than a few scattered dwellings including a white cottage named "Caalmojo".
