= Glenmore Bay =

Bay in Lochaber, Scotland

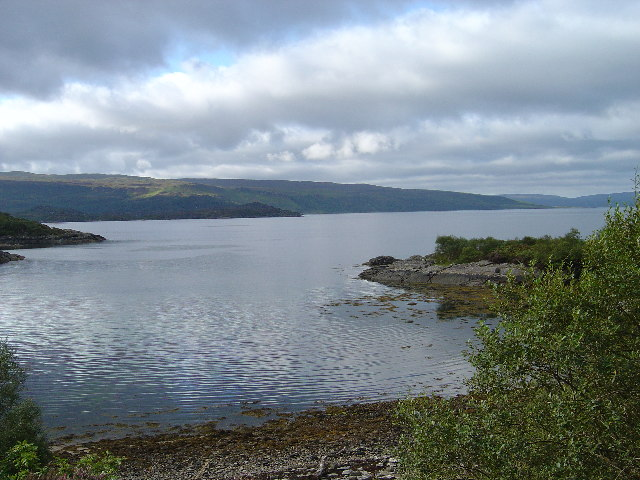
- Glenmore Bay, Loch Sunart. From the road near Glenborrodale.

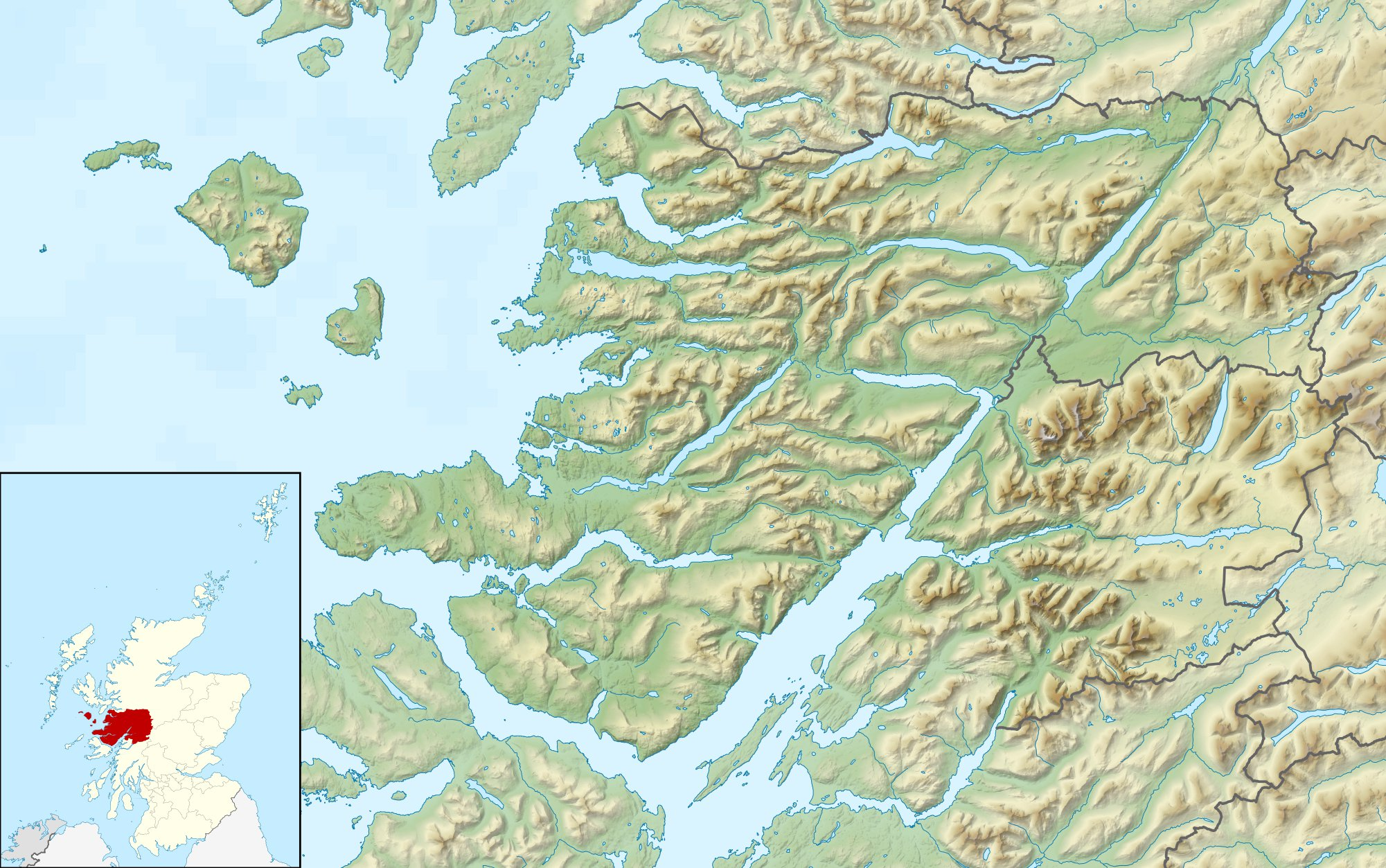
- Location within Lochaber
- Location: Loch Sunart; Ardnamurchan, Scotland
- Coordinates: 56°41′2.040″N 5°56′10.344″W
- River sources: Glenmore River
- Ocean/sea sources: Atlantic Ocean
- Basin countries: Scotland
- Max. length: 0.72 km (0.45 mi)
- Max. width: 0.6 km (0.37 mi)
- Islands: Eilean Mòr
- Settlements: Glenmore

Glenmore Bay is a remote, tidal, 150° orientated, coastal embayment, located on the southern coastline of the west to east orientated Ardnamurchan peninsula, at the head of the sea loch Loch Sunart.

== Settlements ==
Glenmore Bay has small settlement at the head of the bay, and includes the Ardnamurchan Natural History and Visitor Centre, which is a popular tourist destination. The tiny settlement of Glenbeg is east of the village. The minor single lane with passing places, B Road: B8007 provides access to the bay, and connects to the main A861 at Salen 9 miles (14 km) to the east, passing the villages of Glenborrodale, Laga and Salen, as it passes the beautiful curves of Loch Sunart.

== Geography ==
Glenmore Bay is one of a series of four bays, which are on the same chord of 1.73 miles (2.78 km), which are bounded on the bulk of the Glenborrodale nature reserve in the east and the Ardslignish peninsula on the west. Glenmore Bay is at the far eastern end of the Chord, followed by Port na Croisg to the west, followed by Camas Fearna to the final small bay, Camas Bàn before the Ardslignish peninsula. Glenmore Bay is separated from Port na Croisg, by the sometimes island of Eilean Mòr, which is separated from the land by a tidal river, and at times, a small peninsula. Glenmore Bay is a tidal bay with a long shore of machair and sea-grasses as the land meets the bay proper.

== Gallery ==
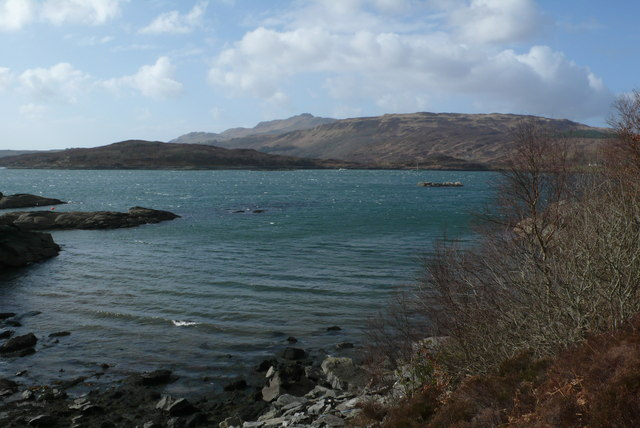
Glenmore Bay, Loch Sunart

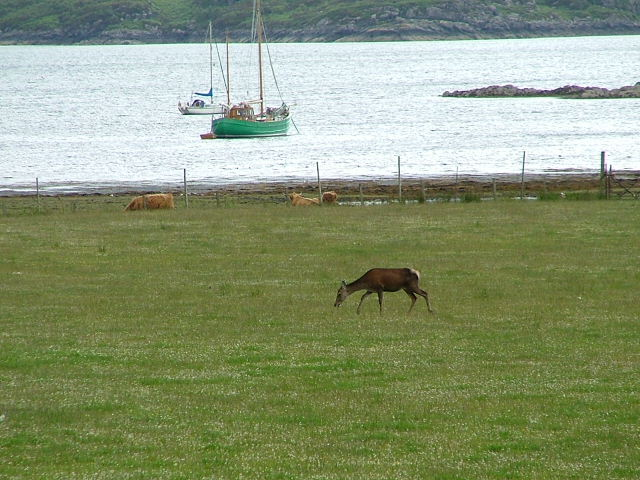
Deer, Cattle and Boats At Glenmore Bay.
