= Port an Eilean Mhòir boat burial =

Viking boat burial site

Port an Eilean Mhòir
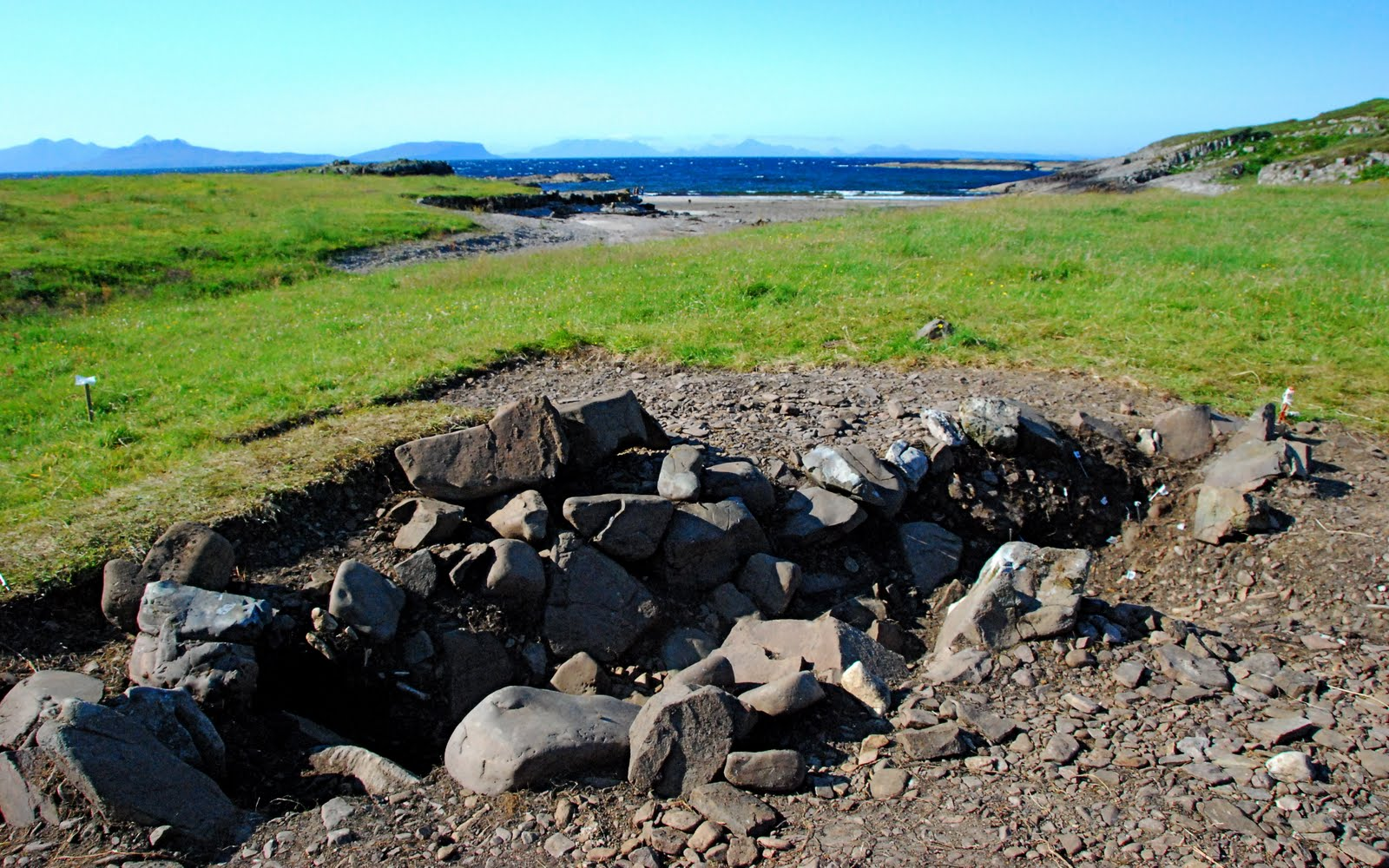
- The Port an Eilean Mhòir boat burial site

- Location of the site in Scotland
- 56°45′36″N 6°1′12″W
- Location: Highland, Scotland

The Port an Eilean Mhòir boat burial is a Viking boat burial site in Ardnamurchan, Scotland, the most westerly point on the island of Great Britain. Dated to the 10th century, the burial consists of a Viking boat about 5 metres (15 feet) long by 1.5 metres (5 ft) wide in which a man was buried with his shield, sword and spear and other grave goods.

In 1924 nails, rivets and other finds were discovered by T. C. Lethbridge at Cul na Croise (English: Gorten Bay) in Ardnamurchan, which were characterised at the time as having come from a ship burial; the exact location of this site is lost and so the nature of the finds cannot be determined with certainty. A similar case was the mainland burial site at Huna, Caithness, discovered in 1935, although this was better documented and is accepted as a ship burial. Nine other Viking ship burials, or possible burials, have been found on Scottish islands, including six in the Hebrides and another three in the Northern Isles.

The discovery was announced by archaeologists from the Ardnamurchan Transitions Project, directed by the Universities of Manchester and Leicester, CFA Archaeology and Archaeology Scotland on 18 October 2011. Students and academics have for several years investigated archaeological sites on the Ardnamurchan peninsula and have previously made a number of discoveries, including an Iron Age fort and a Neolithic chambered cairn. The project aims to examine social change on the peninsula from 6,000 years ago to the 18th- and 19th-century Highland Clearances. Its work has been supported by the Ardnamurchan Estate, which owns a large part of the peninsula.

The site is located on the north coast of Ardnamurchan at Port an Eilean Mhòir between Achateny and Ockle. The archaeologists had initially thought that the site of the burial was merely a mound of rocks cleared from fields in recent times. On further investigation it was realised that it was a boat burial.

== Finds ==
The vessel itself had almost entirely rotted away, but its outline and around 200 rivets still remained in place, some still connected to small pieces of wood. The ship had almost entirely been filled with stones in what may have been a ritual practice.

Within the boundary of the ship, archaeologists discovered the fragmentary remains of a man, including pieces of an arm bone and teeth. He had been buried with grave goods including a shield, placed over his chest in traditional Viking-style, a sword bent into an S-shape, symbolizing the death of the most important weapon, and a spear, which had been snapped in half prior to the burial, presumably part of the burial. Other grave goods consisted of an axe, a knife, a bronze ring-pin from Ireland, items of pottery, a whetstone from Norway, a drinking horn, a sickle, and a set of tongs and a ladle, which each contained traces of organic materials.

Using isotopic dating technology, which combined strontium and lead from the enamel of the teeth with nitrogen and carbon from the dentine samples from the same teeth, researchers were able to create a timeline of the life of this individual, based on the foods they ate. The enamel samples can tell a relative timeline from ages 2–6, while the nitrogen and carbon can give information of ages 2–15. By combining these two pieces of information, researchers learned that the individual had a highly terrestrial diet up until the age of 15, with a large increase of marine materials from ages 3–5. This information narrowed down the possible places of origin, based on the accessibility to a marine diet and similarity to the data of nearby locations. This, combined with the raw materials used in the grave goods and ship structure narrowed down the areas of origin to eastern Ireland, north-eastern mainland Scotland, Norway, and Sweden.

The contents of the ship and the size were rather unusual for a presumably powerful and wealthy warrior being honored in death. The size of the boat was small enough to raise the question whether it was intended for funerary purposes. It perhaps could have been a part of a larger flotilla, and was used for the burial out of convenience. This can imply a sudden death, or the lack of resources for a lavish burial that is so common among the Norse. The contents of the ship are cramped and close together, with everything in the singular opening, having no smaller compartments or sections for grave goods. The spear, had it not been broken prior to the burial, would have been too large to fit in the ship. Additionally, the shield, placed on the chest of the individual, was re-adjusted to give more space in the small opening. It is noted that while there are both domestic possessions and possessions of war, the burial lacks many items of personal value, apart from the Irish pin. The implications of whether this individual could have been a merchant or an explorer rather than a warrior are still being debated by scholars.

After the finds have been examined and conserved, it is expected that they will be claimed by the Crown as treasure trove which will enable museums to apply to keep and display them. The local Member of the Scottish Parliament, Dave Thompson, has called for the finds to be put on display at Ardnamurchan, and local tourism chief John Peel has suggested that a permanent historical exhibition could be established on the peninsula to boost tourism. In 2014 some of the finds were put on display at the British Museum in an exhibition titled Vikings: Life and Legend.

Dr Oliver Harris lifting the axehead on site.

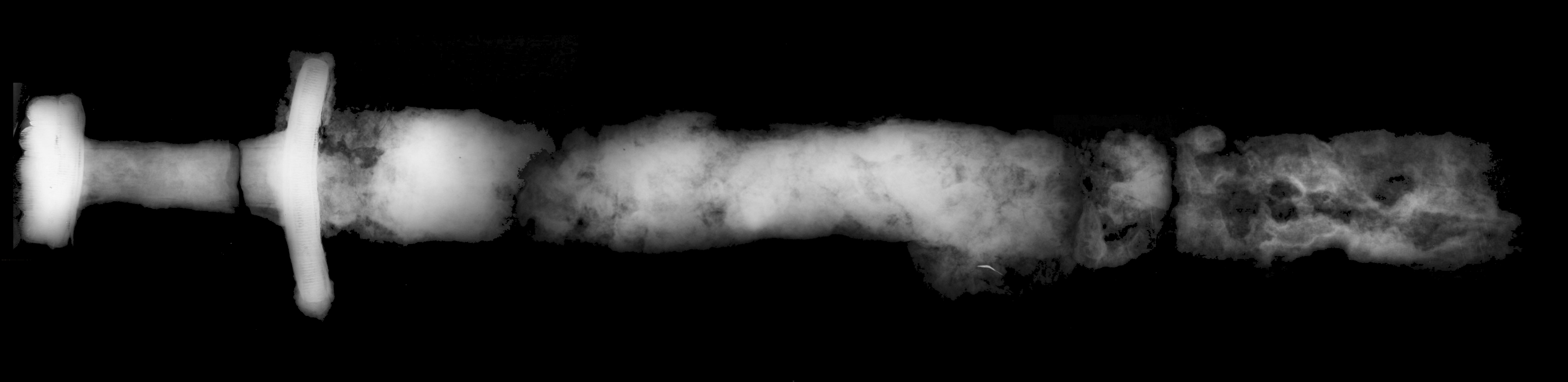
An x-ray image of the sword.

== Significance and context ==
According to Dr. Hannah Cobb, a co-director of the project from the University of Manchester, the boat burial is "one of the most important Norse graves ever excavated in Britain." It is the first time a confirmable Viking boat burial has been found fully intact on the UK mainland. Although other boat burials have been found, most famously that at Sutton Hoo in Suffolk, they had either been deposited centuries earlier or had not been successfully excavated due to deficiencies in archaeological methods.

The site's location, near existing Neolithic and Bronze Age cairns, gives it added significance. Dr. Cobb has commented: "We don't think the association with the older monuments can be a coincidence – this was a place which was very important to people over an extraordinarily long period of time." No Viking settlements have been found in the area, but the Vikings had a significant presence in Scotland. They first began raiding Scotland in the eighth century and settled in Orkney and Shetland in the ninth century. There are previously known Viking ship burials on Scottish islands at Carn nan Bharraich and Lochan Kill Mhor and one other site on Oronsay, two more on Colonsay and one on North Uist in the Hebrides, at Scar on Sanday in Orkney, one on Fetlar, and another at Ling Ness on Mainland Shetland.

Port an Eilean Mhòir is about 45 kilometres (28 mi) southeast of Loch na h-Airde in Skye, where evidence of a Norse-era maritime centre has been found, although it is not known if it was in existence as early as the 10th century. Dr Oliver Harris of the University of Leicester, one of the ATP co-directors who worked on the site, believes that the occupant of the burial was "someone of high status, who was wealthy and powerful and very interested in being seen as a warrior."

== See also ==
- Norse–Gaels
- Scandinavian Scotland
- Uí Ímair
