= Sanna, Ardnamurchan =

Coordinates: 56°44′43″N 6°10′31″W

Sanna: Scottish Gaelic: Sanna
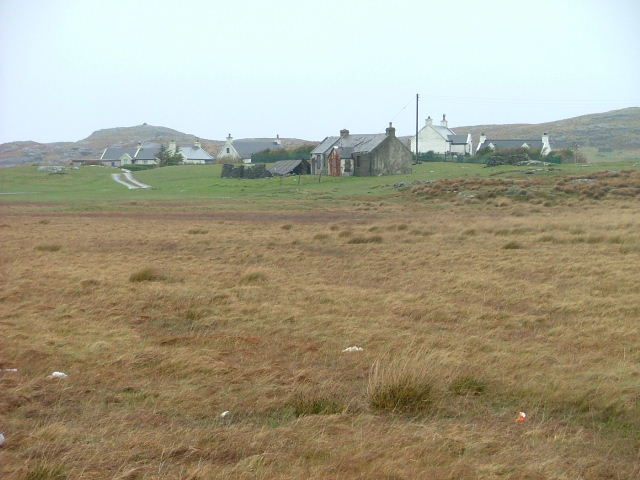
- Houses at Sanna

- Location within the Lochaber area
- OS grid reference: NM447692
- Council area: Highland
- Country: Scotland
- Sovereign state: United Kingdom
- Post town: ACHARACLE
- Postcode district: PH36
- Police: Scotland
- Fire: Scottish
- Ambulance: Scottish

Sanna (Scottish Gaelic: Sanna) is a hamlet at the far western tip of the Scottish peninsula of Ardnamurchan, in Lochaber, Highland. It is one of the most westerly settlements on the mainland of Great Britain, and consists of a small collection of crofts and houses around a series of unspoilt sandy beaches. It is the setting for most of Alasdair Maclean's autobiographical book Night Falls on Ardnamurchan.
