= B roads in Zone 8 of the Great Britain numbering scheme =

The numbering zones for roads in Great Britain

B roads are numbered routes in Great Britain of lesser importance than A roads. See the article Great Britain road numbering scheme for the rationale behind the numbers allocated.

== Zone 8 (3 digits) ==
Road	From	To	Notes
B800	Newbridge	Ferry Muir Rd. Queensferry	
B801	A838 at Richonich	Kinlochbervie	
B802	Kilsyth	B803 at Glenmavis	
B803	A73 near Glenmavis	Coatbridge	
B804	Coatbridge	Gartcosh	
B805	A9 at Laurieston	Bowhouse Roundabout	
B806	B765 at Garthamlock	Gartcosh	
B807 (defunct)	A802 Duke Street, Glasgow	A80 (later A8) Alexandra Parade, Glasgow	Now part of the B763.
B808	Partick	near Springburn	
B809 (defunct)	Trongate, Glasgow	Buchanan Street, Glasgow	Declassified.
B810	B805 at Brightons	Shieldhill, Falkirk	
B811 (defunct)	Great Western Road, Glasgow	Garscube Road, Glasgow	Declassified sometime after 1974.
B812	Springburn	near Lenzie	
B813 (defunct)	Partick	Anniesland	The northern portion became a portion of the A739 in the 1960s when the Clyde Tunnel opened while the southern portion was declassified around 1974 when the A814 was rerouted.
B814	Dalmuir	Kilbowie Roundabout	
B815	M898, A898 and A898 at Erskine	A8 at Bishopton, Renfrewshire	
B816	Bonnybridge	Glenfuir Rd. Falkirk	
B817	B9176 near Alness	Kildary	
B818	Denny	B834 near Killearn	
B819	Cadder	Chryston	
B820 (defunct)	Loop off A803 in Kirkintilloch		Declassified sometime after the early 1970s.
B821	A81 at Blanefield	Carbeth	Part of the B821 from Strathblane to Auchinreoch has become the A891
B822	Lennoxtown	B8032 and A81	
B823	A9 Stirling	A9 Bridge of Allan	
B824	A820 near Doune	Keir Roundabout	
B825	A803 at Linlithgow Bridge	A9 Caldercruix	
B826	A84 near Doune	A873 at Thornhill, Perthshire	
B827	A822 near Braco	A85 at Dalginross	
B828	A83 at Rest and Be Thankful Viewpoint	B839, Hell's Glen	Passes through Glen Mhor. Acts as a diversion when A83 closed avoiding 59 mile diversion. Known as Old Military Road. Unclassified until 1932.
B829	Aberfoyle	near Stronachlachar	
B830	Dumbarton	Barloan Toll Roundabout	
B831 (defunct)	A82 south of the Arden Roundabout	B832 in Crosskeys	Upgraded to a portion of the A818 in 2005.
B832	A82	A818	
B833	B872 at Garelochhead (east)	at Coulport (west).	The B833 is the main road on the Rosneath Peninsula.
B834	A809	Killearn	
B835	A81	A811 Buchlyvie	
B836	A815 at Dalinlongart	A886 at Auchenbreck	Passes through Glen Lean, past Loch Tarsan, round the head of Loch Striven at Ardtaraig. On the Cowal Peninsula, Argyll and Bute.
B837	Drymen	Balmaha	
B838	A83 at Arrochar	Arrochar	
B839	A815	Lochgoilhead	Passes through Hells Glen. Forms part of A83 diversion together with B828 avoiding 59 mile diversion.
B840	A816 near Carnasserie Castle	A819 at Cladich	Follows southern bank of Loch Awe for most of its length
B841	A816	Bellanoch	Ends near Bellanoch Swing Bridge.
B842	Claonaig	Southend (Scotland)	Road stops and continues at Campbelltown.
B843	near Campbelltown	Machrihanish	Connects with B842
B844	Clachan Bridge	Kilninver	
B845	A828 at Barcaldine	Loch Awe south of Kilchrenan	Crosses Loch Etive south of Bonawe; Crosses the A85 at Taynuilt
B846	Aberfeldy	Rannoch railway station	
B847	B846 Balmore	near Falls of Bruar	
B849	A884 at Lochaline	Drimnin	
B850 (defunct)	B849 at Carnoch	Acharacle Pier	Section east of Salen became a portion of the A861 around 1923–1924. Around this time (and definitely by 1932) the B850 was extended around Loch Shiel and Loch Moidart to a pier on the northern shore of the loch. The remainder also became a portion of the A861 in 1967 after the new road was built between the A830 and B850.
B851	A9 south of Daviot	B862 northeast of Errogie	Passes through Farr and East Croachy
B852	Dores Beach B862	B862	
B853	B9006 at Inverness	Southside Road, Inverness	
B854 (defunct)	Milton	Balchraggan	Renumbered as A833, likely by 1939. A 1938 map shows the route as B854, while a 1939 and 1944 map show both numbers. A 1946 map shows the route as A833.
B854 (defunct)	Drumkinnon, Balloch	Haldane's Mill	Number not allocated until 1938–1939; declassified sometime after the mid-1970s.
B855	A836 at Dunnet	Easter Head (Dunnet Head)	The most northerly numbered road on the mainland of Great Britain; Passes through Hunspow and Brough
B856	Strathcarron Junction	Strathcarron railway station	Now part of the A890.
B857	A811 Alexandria	A82	
B858	South of Drymen	North of Drymen	
B859 (defunct)	Braemore Junction	Poolewe	Became a portion of the A832 by 1932 (probably earlier).
B859 (defunct)	High Street, Dingwall	Station Road, Dingwall	One portion now part of the A862, the remainder unclassified.
B860 (defunct)	Ullapool	Ledmore	Renumbered to A835 by 1932.
B860 (defunct)	Paisley Road, Glasgow	Shieldhall	Former portion of A8; declassified when the M8 opened.
B861	B851 at Inverarnie	Inverness	
B862	Fort Augustus	Inverness	
B863	North Ballachulish	Glencoe	Via Kinlochleven
B864	A839 near Lairg	A837 at Inveran	
B865	Raigmore Interchange	Shore Street Roundabout	
B866	A886	A886	
B867	A9	A9	Passes through Bankfoot village.
B868 (defunct)	Poles	Dornoch	Renumbered to the B9168 due to extension of the A9, which would have put the B868 out-of-zone. Originally planned to be merged into the B867 (now the B9167), which would have been completely out-of-zone.
B869	A894	A837	
B870	B876	B874	
B871	A897 near Kinbrace railway station	A836 near Bettyhill	
B872	A814 at Whistlefield roundabout (north).	A814 near Faslane Cemetery (south).	
B873	A836 at Altnaharra	B871 at Syre, Highland	
B874	A99 near Wick	Thurso	
B875	A844	Drumachloy	This road is located on the Isle of Bute
B876	Castletown	A99 at Reiss	
B878	Rothesay	A844	This road is located on the Isle of Bute.
B879	B842	Carradale	
B880	A841 near Brodick	A841 near Blackwaterfoot	This road is also known as 'The String' and is located on the Isle of Arran.
B881	Rothesay	A844	This road is located on the Isle of Bute.
B882	Tobermory	B8073 near Tobermory	This road is located on the Isle of Mull.
B883	A87	Peinchorran	This road is located on the Isle of Skye.
B884	A683 at Lonmore	near Milovaig	This road is located on the Isle of Skye.
B885	Portree	Bracadale	This road is located on the Isle of Skye.
B886	A850	Waternish	This road is located on the Isle of Skye.
B887	A859 north of Ardhasaig, Isle of Harris	Huisinis, Isle of Harris	Follows the northern shore of West Loch Tarbert for the first half of its route Goes through Bun Abhainn Eadarra, Miabhaig, Abhainn Suidhe and Beitearsaig
B888	A865 at Dalabrog	Pollarchar	In the southernmost part of South Uist; Continues, unclassified, to the ferry for Barra
B889 (defunct)	B888 in Dalabrog	pier at Loch Baghasdail	Became a portion of the A865.
B889 (defunct)	Ring road on the Isle of Barra		Upgraded to the A888 by 1934.
B890	Groigearraidh	Loch Skipport	This road is located on the Isle of South Uist.
B891	A865	Peters Port	This road is located on the Isle of Benbecula
B892	A865	A865	This road is located on the Isle of Benbecula
B893	A865	Newtonferry	This road is located on the Isle of North Uist.
B894	A867	Loch Eport	This road is located on the Isle of North Uist.
B895	A857 north of Stornoway	Tolsta	Follows the western shore of Broad Bay; Goes by way of Tong
B896	Great Cumbrae	Great Cumbrae	This road circles the island.
B897	A859 approx 6 km southwest of Stornoway	Ranais	Goes via Crossbost
B898	A9	A827	
B899	Millport	B896	This road is located on the Isle of Great Cumbrae

== Zone 8 (4 digits) ==
Road	From	To	Notes
B8000	A886, Newton, Argyll	A8003, Kames, Argyll	Is a road in the west of Cowal peninsula, Argyll and Bute. Originally ran from Auchenbreck to Port Bannatyne. Swapped with the A886; one portion is now the B866.
B8001	Claonaig	A83 at Kennacraig	
B8002	A816	Aird	
B8003	near Balvicar	North Cuan	
B8004	A82 near Spean Bridge	Banavie	
B8005	B8004, near Gairlochy	Achnasaul	
B8006	A830	A830	Passes through Caol Originally ran from Dalnabreck to Daleila. Declassified in the 1960s, probably when the new section of the A861 opened.
B8007	A861, Salen, Ardnamurchan	Achosnich	the main road of the Ardnamurchan peninsula and thus the most westerly numbered road on the mainland of Great Britain
B8008	A830	Mallaig	Originally ran from Inchmore to Dunballoch. Renumbered to the B9164 (itself now out-of-zone) in 1935 after the A9 was extended, which would have put the B8008 out-of-zone.
B8009	A863	Portnalong	This road is located on the Isle of Skye.
B8010 (defunct)	Stornoway	Brasclete	Declassified in the 1970s.
B8011	Garynahine, Isle of Lewis	Timsgerraidh, Isle of Lewis	
B8012 (defunct)	Loch Laxavat	Carloway	Declassified in the 1970s.
B8013	Lìonal, Isle of Lewis	Eòropaidh, Isle of Lewis	
B8014	Port Nis, Isle of Lewis	Eòropaidh, Isle of Lewis	
B8015	Lìonal, Isle of Lewis	Sgiogarstaigh, Isle of Lewis	
B8016	A846	A846 near Bridgend	
B8017	A847	B8018	This road is located on the Isle of Islay
B8018	A847	Sanaigmore	This road is located on the Isle of Islay
B8019	B8079	A924	
B8020	Broxburn	Winchburgh	
B8021	Gairloch	Melvaig	
B8022	B825 near Avonbridge	B825 at Limerigg	
B8023	B802, near Kilsyth	A803, near Kirkintilloch	
B8024	A83	A83 at Inverneil	
B8025	A816	Keillmore	
B8026	A83	A83	Passes via West Loch Pier Originally ran from Raddery to Poyntzfield. Renumbered to the B9160 in 1935 after the A9 was extended, which would have put the B8026 out-of-zone.
B8027	Stornoway	Stornoway	This road is located on the Isle of Lewis.
B8028	Shieldhill, Falkirk	Falkirk	
B8029	Linlithgow Bridge	A706 near Linlithgow	
B8030	Milngavie	Milngavie	
B8031	A873	B822	
B8032	Doune	Doune	
B8033	Braco	Keir Roundabout	
B8034	A81 at Port of Menteith	A811 at Arnprior	
B8035	Salen	Loch Beg Bridge	This road is located on the Isle of Mull.
B8036	A87	A850	This road is located on the Isle of Skye.
B8037	A811	B822 at Kippen	
B8039	near A73	Cumbernauld	Originally ran from Windhill to Balnagown. Extended and renumbered to the B9169 after the A9 was extended, which would have put the B8039 out-of-zone.
B8040 (defunct)	A82 at Laggan	A82 at Aberchalder	Declassified and now a footpath.
B8041	A885 Argyll Street, Dunoon	A815 Alexandra Street, Dunoon	
B8042	A885 Argyll Street, Dunoon	A815 Wellington Street, Dunoon	
B8043	A861	A844	
B8044	A861 at Acharacle	near Ardtoe	
B8045	Jetty at the northern tip of Lismore	St. Moluag's Cathedral, Lismore	In the Inner Hebrides
B8046	A904	Mid Calder	
B8047	B792 at Torphichen	B8028 at Westfield	
B8048	Kirkintilloch	Junction 5, M80 at Cumbernauld	
B8049	Bearsden	Allander Toll Roundabout	
B8050	Milngavie	A810	
B8051	Stirling	Stirling	
B8052	Stirling	Stirling	
B8053	Airdrie	Airdrie	
B8054	Cumbernauld	Cumbernauld	
B8056	A832	Red Point	
B8057	A832 at Poolewe	near Cove	
B8058	Airdrie	B802	
B8059	B8011, Isle of Lewis	Barraglom, Great Bernera	Crosses to Great Bernera from Lewis via the Bernera Bridge
B8060	Balallan, Isle of Lewis	Leumrabhagh, Isle of Lewis	
B8061 (defunct)	A81/A84 in Callander	Railway yard	Declassified between 1976 and 1981.
B8062	Crieff	Dunning	
B8063	A822	near Luncarty	
B8064	Perth Road bridge, Dunblane	Fourways Roundabout, Dunblane	Former routing of the A9 through Dunblane.
B8065	Scarinish	Barrapoll	This road is located on the Isle of Tiree
B8066	B8068	Hynish	This road is located on the Isle of Tiree
B8067	B8066	Balephuil	This road is located on the Isle of Tiree
B8068	near Scarinish	B6065	This road is located on the Isle of Tiree
B8069	B8068	Caoles	This road is located on the Isle of Tiree
B8070	Arianagour	Crossapol	This road is located on the Isle of Coll
B8071	Arianagour	Ballyhaugh	This road is located on the Isle of Coll
B8072	Arnabost	Sorisdale	This road is located on the Isle of Coll
B8073	B8035	Tobermory	This road is located on the Isle of Mull.
B8074	A82, south of Bridge of Orchy	A85, near Dalmally	through Glen Orchy
B8075	A84	A811	
B8076 (defunct)	Sterling Road, Dunblane	Sunnyside, Dunblane	Became a portion of the A820 sometime after 1971.
B8077	A85	A85 at Dalmally	
B8078 (defunct)	Station Road, Sterling	Cowane Street, Sterling	Now a portion of the B8052.
B8079	near Falls of Bruar	B8019	
B8080	B816 at Falkirk	B803	
B8081	A9 at Blackford	A9	
B8082 (defunct)	A9/B9006 at Beechwood Business Park	B862 Dores Road	Inverness Southern Distributor Road; upgraded to an A road with the same number.
B8083	A87, Broadford	Elgol	This road is located on the Isle of Skye.
B8084	A706, Whitedale Roundabout	B8028	
B8085	near Scalasaig	Garvard	This road is located on the Isle of Colonsay
B8086	Kiloran	Upper Kilchattan	This road is located on the Isle of Colonsay
B8087	Glassard	Glassard	This road is located on the Isle of Colonsay
~~B8088~~ - ~~B8099~~	unused		

== See also ==
- A roads in Zone 8 of the Great Britain numbering scheme
- List of motorways in the United Kingdom
- Transport in Glasgow#Other Roads
- Transport in Scotland#Road network
