= Kentra Bay =

Bay in Scotland

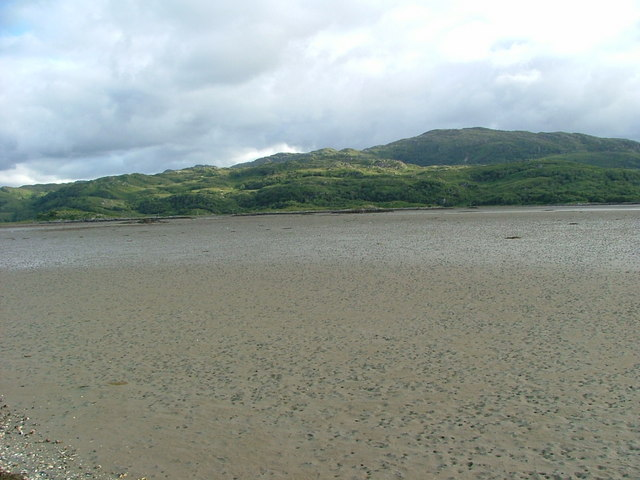
- South across the mud of Kentra Bay

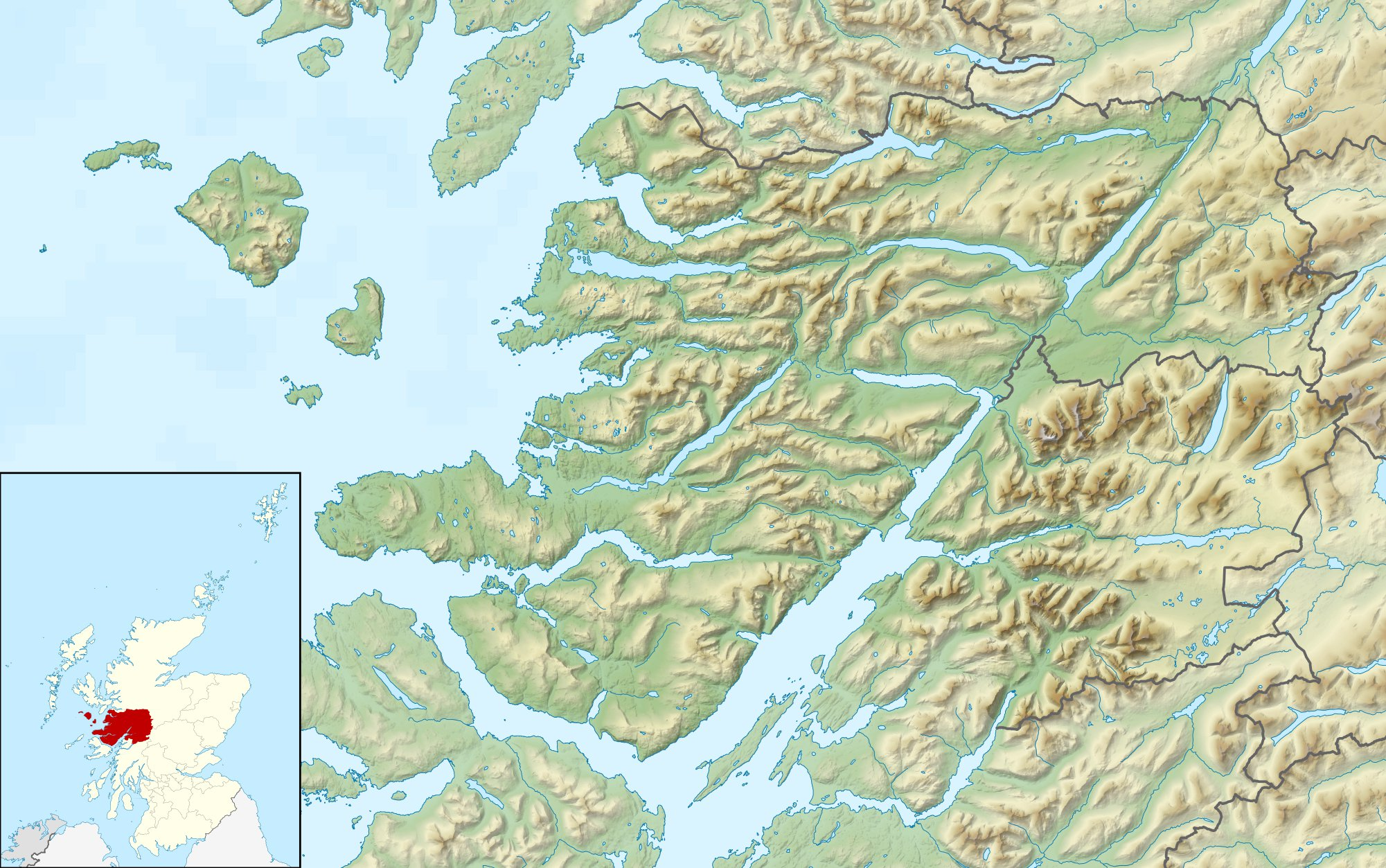
- Location within Lochaber
- Location: Northeast end of the Ardnamurchan peninsula near Acharacle, Scottish Highlands
- Coordinates: 56°44′57.844″N 5°51′40.439″W
- River sources: Dig Bhàn; Alt Eas an Taileir
- Ocean/sea sources: Atlantic Ocean
- Basin countries: Scotland
- Max. length: 2.92 km (1.81 mi)
- Max. width: 2.09 km (1.30 mi)
- Islands: Eileanan nan Gad
- Settlements: Kentra; Ardtoe

Kentra Bay, also known as the Singing Sands, is a remote tidal, 306° orientated, coastal embayment located on the northern shore of the Ardnamurchan peninsula, at the extreme eastern side, where it meets the mainland proper, near Acharacle, in the western Highlands of Scotland. Kentra Bay contains a large expanse of mudflat at low tide and small fragments of salt marsh, sand dune, and machair. Kentra Bay is an inland bay separated from the sea via a channel at the northeast side.

== Settlement ==
At the head of the channel that connects the bay to the sea on the north coast lies the small settlement of Ardtoe, which has sandy beaches with views to the island of Eigg. Further east along the B8004 is the settlement which gives the bay its name, Kentra. A short distance further east is the large village of Acharacle. To the south of Kentra, and located on the southeast coast of Kentra Bay, is the tiny former crofting settlement of Arivegaig.

== Geography ==
The bay has an irregular shape, located inland from the sea, and is connected to the sea through a channel that is only 170 metres wide at the sea with the channel widening to some 500metres when it meets the bay proper, some 1.4 km from the sea, on a bearing of 120°. To the east of the bay is Kentra Moss, which consists of several raised mires occupying the low-lying coastal flats between Kentra Bay and the River Shiel. Much of Kentra Moss has been damaged by drainage and localised peat cutting. To the west of the bay is the small peninsula of some 1.61 km in length with Kentra bay on the east side and the sea loch, Loch Ceann Traigh, on the open west side. The small peninsula is heavily forested, with several small peaks, with (Scottish Gaelic: Creag an Fhradhairc) at 88metres being the highest. The south coast of the bay consists of mixed bogs and rocky areas with three small rivers joining the bay. The first of these is the (Scottish Gaelic: Allt a' Ghoirtein eòrna), further east is the (Scottish Gaelic: Allt Eas an Failer), and east again, on the bottom right corner of the bay is the large burn (Scottish Gaelic: Allt Beithe). On the eastern shore of the bay is the small river (Scottish Gaelic: Dig Bhàn)

== Islands ==
Kentra Bay has two groups of small islands. Located close to the southern coast is the small island group, consisting of two islands, called (Scottish Gaelic: Eileanan Gad). These small islands are easily accessible at low tide. Further north, close to the east coast, and slightly north of the small settlement of Kentra, lies the group of tiny islands called (Scottish Gaelic: Eileanan Loisgte). These are also accessible at low tide. Further north at the channel that connects the bay to the sea loch are two very small, unnamed islands.

== Flora ==
Kentra Bay supports one of the largest salt marshes in the Scottish Highlands. Muddy areas in the sediment support glassworts and submerged eelgrass is common. Sheep grazing provides ideal conditions for rare pink flowered seaside centaury. The bog is an attractive location for botanists. The mildness of the climate supports species more commonly found in the New Forest in the south coast of England. These include brown beak-sedge and bog-sedge.

== Gallery ==
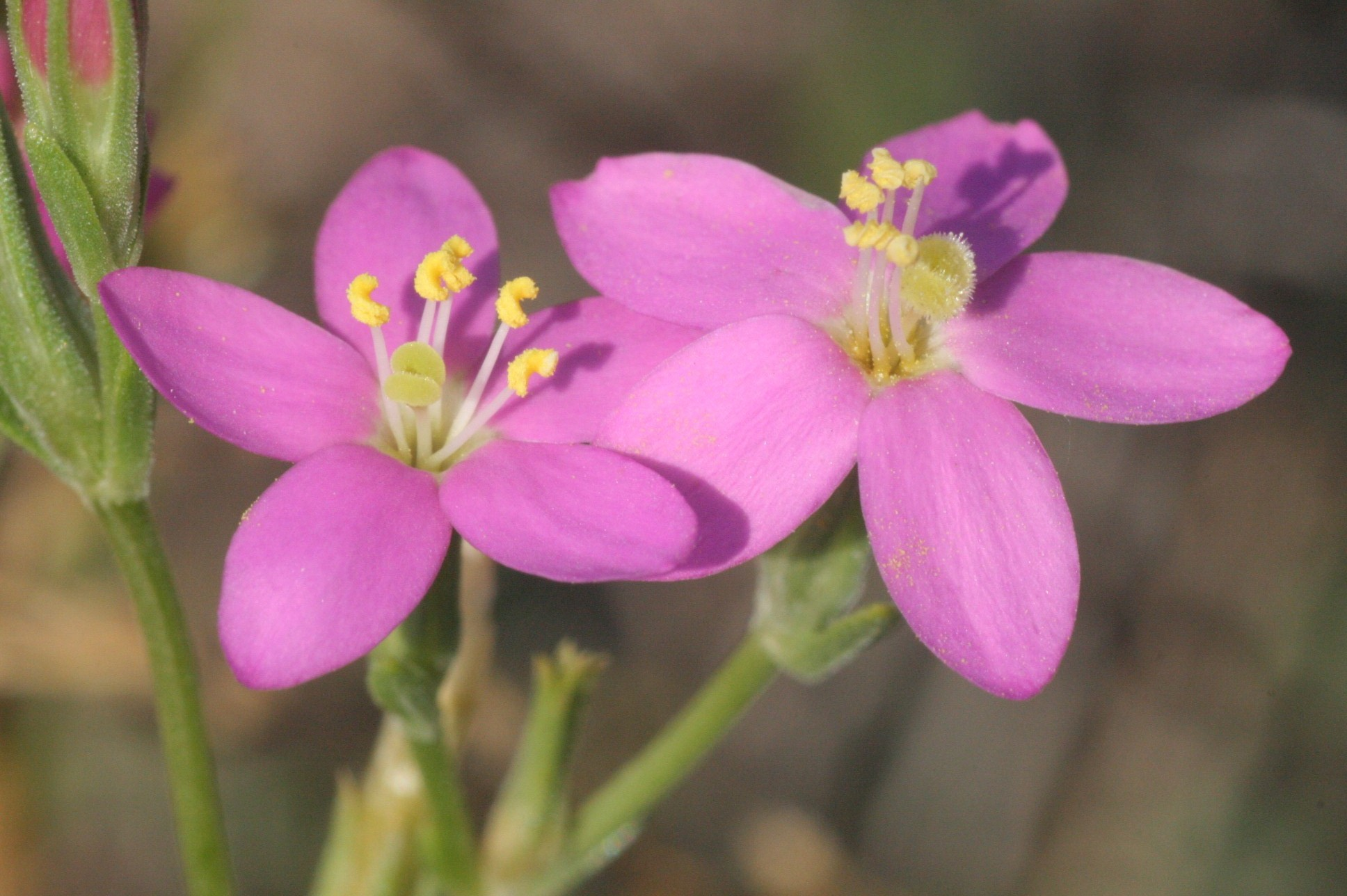
Seaside Centaury

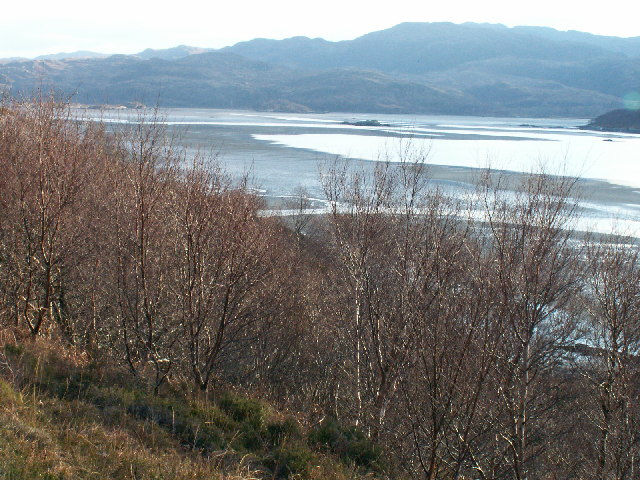
Sand and mud flats in Kentra Bay. This shot taken from the north edge is looking due south across the whole square.

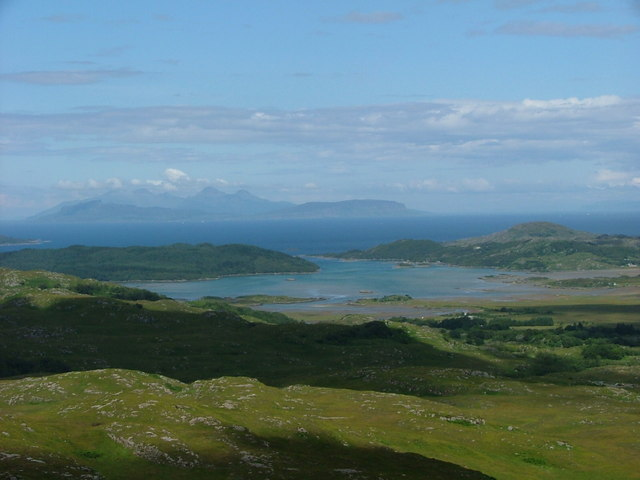
Kentra Bay and the Small Isles from Cruach Bhreac

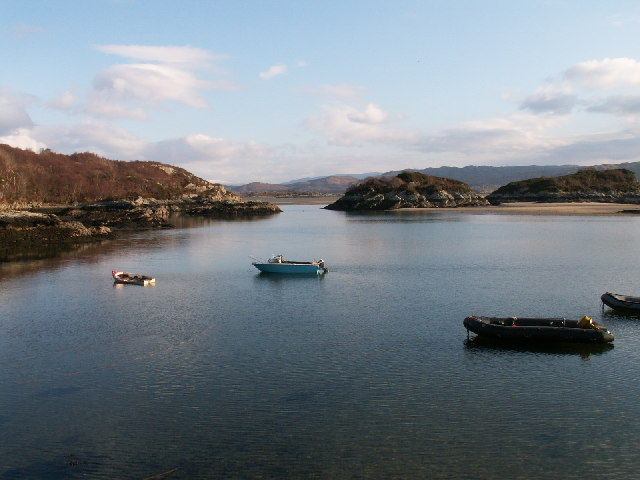
Kentra Bay narrows. Kentra Bay narrows from the old pier between Ardtoe and Gobshealach. Looking SE towards the head of the bay

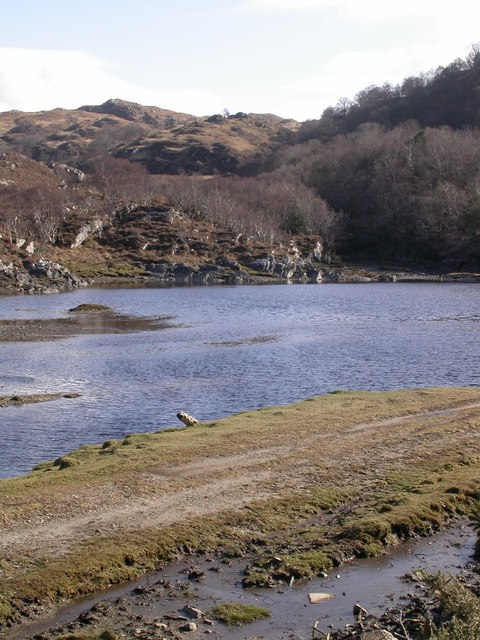
Allt Beithe, Kentra Bay

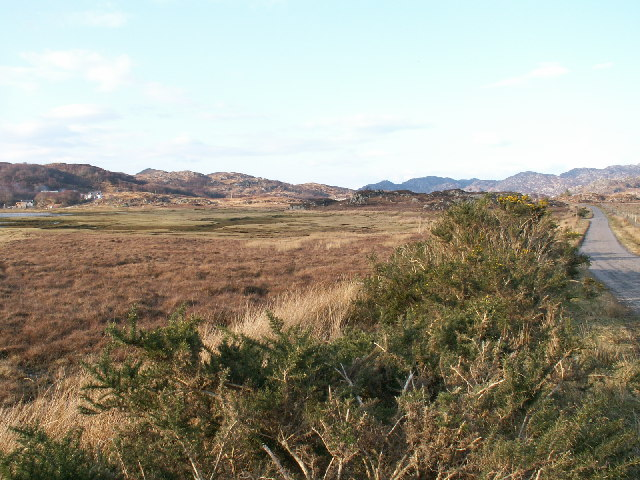
Kentra Bay by Gobshealach. Small bay of Kentra Bay by Gobshealach where much of Kentra moss drains to the sea. The road leads to Ardtoe and Newton of Nrdtoe

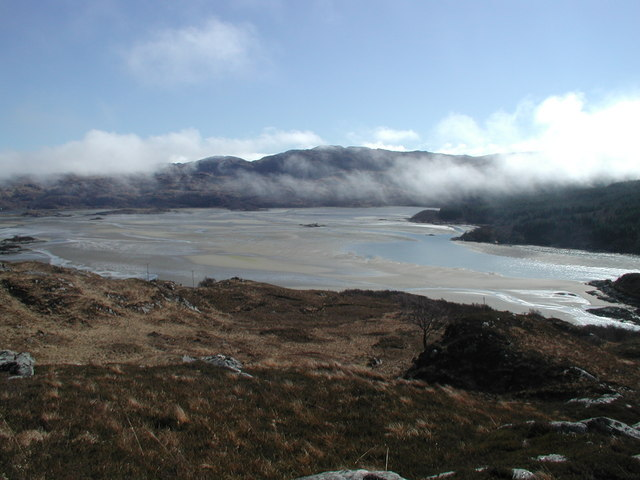
Kentra Bay at Low Tide

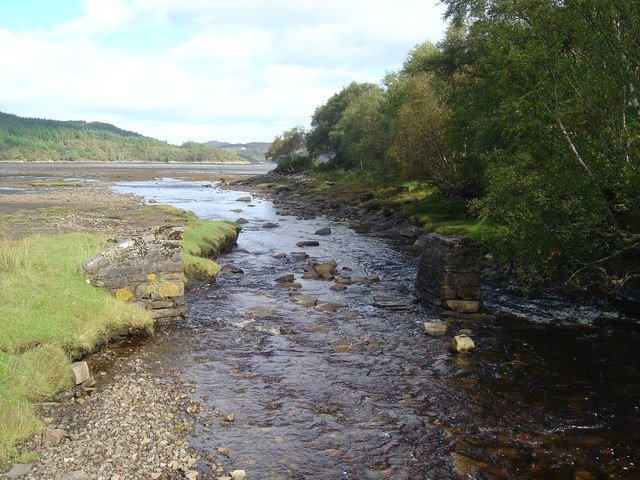
South of Kentra Bay View from a river crossing (of Allt Eas an Taileir?) showing the piers of a previous bridge and the ford beyond. The view opens out to the mudflats of Kentra Bay in the distance.
