= Ben Hiant =

528m high mountain in Scotland

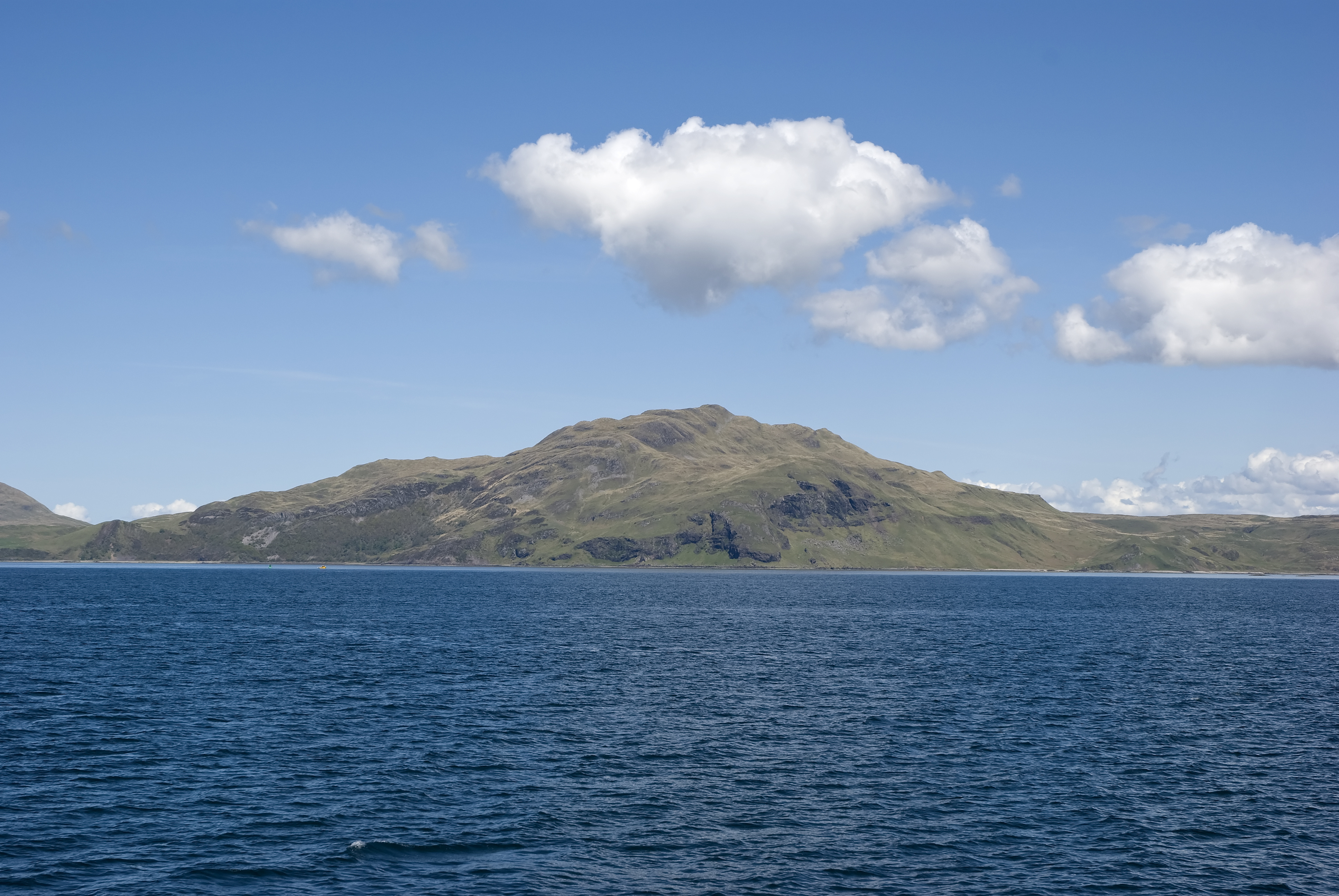
- Ben Hiant viewed from the Sound of Mull

Highest point
- Elevation: 528 m (1,732 ft)
- Prominence: 463 m (1,519 ft)
- Parent peak: Sidhean na Raplaich
- Listing: Marilyn
- Coordinates: 56°41′45″N 6°01′24″W

Naming
- Native name: Beinn Shianta (Scottish Gaelic)
- English translation: Blessed mountain or Charmed mountain
- Pronunciation: Scottish Gaelic: [peɲ hiəɲt̪ə]

Geography
- Location within Mull
- Location: Ardnamurchan, Scotland
- OS grid: NM537536

Ben Hiant (Scottish Gaelic: Beinn Shianta, meaning "blessed mountain" or "charmed mountain") is the highest mountain on the Ardnamurchan peninsula in Scotland. The mountain is situated in the centre of the peninsula, nearby to Kilchoan, looking over the Sound of Mull and Loch Sunart. Despite not being very tall, the mountain is visually very prominent.

== Access and climbing route ==
The hike to the peak begins at the side of the B8007 at an open space of gravel used as a car park in front of a gated road heading up Tom a' Chapuill. The path then turns left giving views of Loch Sunart and the Isle of Mull, before turning into a gradual grassy incline. There is a short rocky section before you reach the soft grassy ridge with views of the final peak, and finally, you climb up to a shoulder, turning left before the final ascent, then turning right and giving access to the peak.

From the top the islands of Mull, Eigg, and Rùm are visible on clear days, as well as Kilchoan and a view over the Sound of Mull and Loch Sunart over to Morvern.

== Geology ==
Around 60 million years ago, the region was volcanically active, with Ben Hiant being the remnant of a volcano. The rock is diverse, being rich in quartz, breccias, basalt, and other volcanic rocks.

== See also ==
- Kilchoan
