= Bogroy =

Coordinates: 57.28567°N 3.82463°W

- Location within the Badenoch and Strathspey area
- OS grid reference: NH901231
- Council area: Highland
- Country: Scotland
- Sovereign state: United Kingdom
- Post town: CARRBRIDGE
- Postcode district: PH23
- Police: Scotland
- Fire: Scottish
- Ambulance: Scottish

Bogroy is a small crofting village, located 0.5 miles northwest of Carrbridge, in Strathspey, in the county of Inverness-shire, Scottish Highlands and is in the Scottish council area of Highland. It lies off the A9 road on the A938 road, west of Skye of Curr, east of Findhom Bridge and northwest of Boat of Garten. The Dulnain river passes close to Bogroy.
