= Portuairk =

Coordinates: 56.73424°N 6.18846°W

Portuairk: Scottish Gaelic: Port Uairce; Scots: The Port
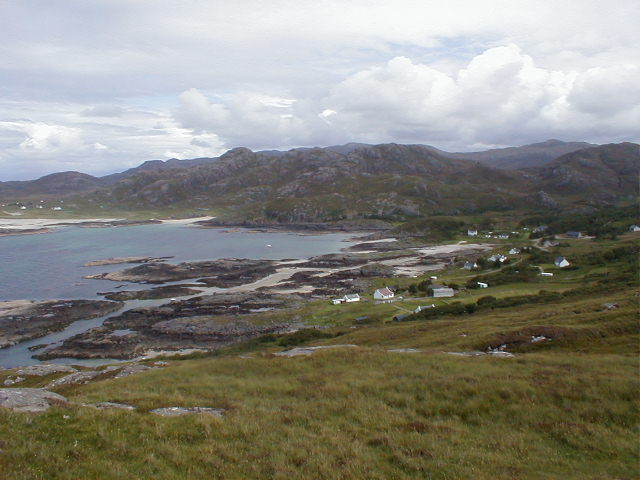
- Portuairk and Sanna Bay from Sgurr nam Meann

- Location within the Lochaber area
- OS grid reference: NM438681
  - Edinburgh: 127 mi (204 km)
  - London: 436 mi (702 km)
- Council area: Highland
- Country: Scotland
- Sovereign state: United Kingdom
- Post town: ACHARACLE
- Postcode district: PH36
- Police: Scotland
- Fire: Scottish
- Ambulance: Scottish
- UK Parliament: Argyll, Bute and South Lochaber
- Scottish Parliament: Skye, Lochaber and Badenoch

Portuairk (Scottish Gaelic: Port Uairce) is a crofting township, at the western end of the Ardnamurchan peninsula, Lochaber, Highland, Scotland.

It is the most westerly settlement on the British mainland, although nearby Kilchoan is the most westerly village.

Overlooking Sanna Bay, the village is visited by walkers and scenery enthusiasts, with views of Skye and the Small Isles: Rùm, Eigg, and Muck.

Cuillin View is a traditional cottage at the end of the bay roughly 172 years old.

== Climate ==
Like much of the British isles, Portuairk has an oceanic climate, with mild, somewhat dry summers and cold, wet winters. Temperatures usually range from 2.4 °C (36.3 °F) to 16.8 °C (62.2 °F), but the all-time temperature range is between −5 °C (23 °F), which is mild for its latitude and 28 °C (82 °F), which is slightly cooler than expected for its latitude. There is an average of 15 snow days per year, with 23 air frosts and a wind speed reaching a peak of 28 km/h (17 mph) in February. The highest wind speed recorded was 120 km/h (75 mph), unusually recorded in July.

Climate data for Portuairk 8 m asl
Month	Jan	Feb	Mar	Apr	May	Jun	Jul	Aug	Sep	Oct	Nov	Dec	Year
Record high °C (°F)	13 (55)	14 (57)	15 (59)	24 (75)	25 (77)	26 (79)	28 (82)	28 (82)	23 (73)	20 (68)	16 (61)	14 (57)	28 (82)
Mean daily maximum °C (°F)	7.4 (45.3)	7.4 (45.3)	8.7 (47.7)	10.6 (51.1)	13.6 (56.5)	15.4 (59.7)	16.8 (62.2)	16.8 (62.2)	15.1 (59.2)	12.4 (54.3)	9.7 (49.5)	7.8 (46.0)	11.8 (53.3)
Mean daily minimum °C (°F)	2.6 (36.7)	2.4 (36.3)	3.3 (37.9)	4.4 (39.9)	6.6 (43.9)	9.1 (48.4)	11 (52)	11 (52)	9.5 (49.1)	7.4 (45.3)	4.8 (40.6)	2.9 (37.2)	6.3 (43.3)
Record low °C (°F)	−3 (27)	−2 (28)	−1 (30)	0 (32)	3 (37)	5 (41)	8 (46)	8 (46)	4 (39)	0 (32)	−3 (27)	−5 (23)	−5 (23)
Average precipitation mm (inches)	187 (7.4)	133 (5.2)	144 (5.7)	89 (3.5)	73 (2.9)	78 (3.1)	93 (3.7)	116 (4.6)	143 (5.6)	180 (7.1)	178 (7.0)	175 (6.9)	1,589 (62.7)
Average precipitation days (≥ 1 mm)	21	17	19	14	13	13	15	16	17	20	20	19	204
Average snowy days (≥ 1 cm)	3	3	3	2	0	0	0	0	0	0	1	3	15
Average relative humidity (%)	84	82	81	79	77	80	83	83	82	82	83	84	82
Mean monthly sunshine hours	34	65	92	159	203	181	138	136	102	72	43	30	1,255
