= Achosnich =

Coordinates: 56.7222°N 6.16783°W

Achosnich: Scottish Gaelic: Achadh Osnaich
- Location within the Lochaber area
- OS grid reference: NM451667
- Council area: Highland
- Country: Scotland
- Sovereign state: United Kingdom
- Postcode district: PH36 4
- Police: Scotland
- Fire: Scottish
- Ambulance: Scottish
- UK Parliament: Argyll, Bute and South Lochaber
- Scottish Parliament: Skye, Lochaber and Badenoch

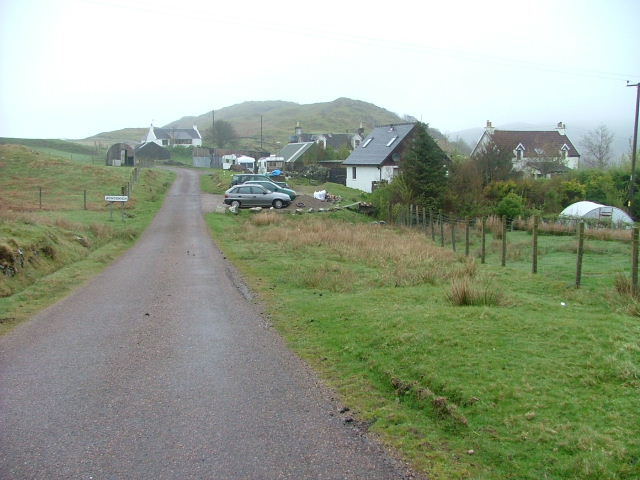
Achosnich

Achosnich (Scottish Gaelic: Achadh Osnaich) is a crofting township in Ardnamurchan, Argyle within the Scottish council area of Highland. It is close to Ardnamurchan Point.

Achosnich is located at the end of the B8007 road which is the major road of the Ardnamurchan peninsula.

== Climate ==
Like much of the British isles, Achosnich has a Temperate Maritime Climate, with mild, somewhat dry summers and cold, wet winters. Temperatures usually range from 2.4 °C (36.3 °F) to 16.8 °C (62.2 °F), but the all-time temperature range is between −5 °C (23 °F), which is mild for its latitude and 28 °C (82 °F), which is slightly cooler than expected for its latitude. There is an average of 15 snow days per year, with 23 air frosts and a wind speed reaching a peak of 28 kilometres per hour (17 mph) in February. The highest wind speed recorded was 120 kilometres per hour (75 mph), unusually recorded in July.

Climate data for Achosnich, 7m amsl
Month	Jan	Feb	Mar	Apr	May	Jun	Jul	Aug	Sep	Oct	Nov	Dec	Year
Record high °C (°F)	13 (55)	14 (57)	15 (59)	24 (75)	25 (77)	26 (79)	28 (82)	28 (82)	23 (73)	20 (68)	16 (61)	14 (57)	28 (82)
Mean daily maximum °C (°F)	7.4 (45.3)	7.4 (45.3)	8.7 (47.7)	10.6 (51.1)	13.6 (56.5)	15.4 (59.7)	16.8 (62.2)	16.8 (62.2)	15.1 (59.2)	12.4 (54.3)	9.7 (49.5)	7.8 (46.0)	11.8 (53.3)
Mean daily minimum °C (°F)	2.6 (36.7)	2.4 (36.3)	3.3 (37.9)	4.4 (39.9)	6.6 (43.9)	9.1 (48.4)	11 (52)	11 (52)	9.5 (49.1)	7.4 (45.3)	4.8 (40.6)	2.9 (37.2)	6.3 (43.3)
Record low °C (°F)	−3 (27)	−2 (28)	−1 (30)	0 (32)	3 (37)	5 (41)	8 (46)	8 (46)	4 (39)	0 (32)	−3 (27)	−5 (23)	−5 (23)
Average precipitation mm (inches)	187 (7.4)	133 (5.2)	144 (5.7)	89 (3.5)	73 (2.9)	78 (3.1)	93 (3.7)	116 (4.6)	143 (5.6)	180 (7.1)	178 (7.0)	175 (6.9)	1,589 (62.7)
Average precipitation days (≥ 1 mm)	21	17	19	14	13	13	15	16	17	20	20	19	204
Average snowy days (≥ 1 cm)	3	3	3	2	0	0	0	0	0	0	1	3	15
Average relative humidity (%)	84	82	81	79	77	80	83	83	82	82	83	84	82
Mean monthly sunshine hours	34	65	92	159	203	181	138	136	102	72	43	30	1,255
