= Kilchoan =

Village on Ardnamurchan peninsula in Scotland

Coordinates: 56.6980°N 6.1033°W

Kilchoan: Scottish Gaelic: Cille Chòmhghain
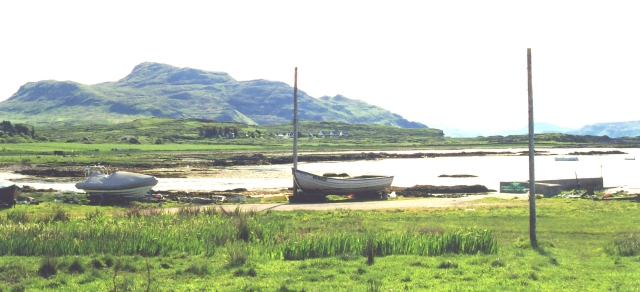
- Kilchoan Bay. Ben Hiant, the highest point of the peninsula rises beyond the small moored boats and bay.

- Location within the Lochaber area
- Population: 150
- OS grid reference: NM488637
- Council area: Highland
- Country: Scotland
- Sovereign state: United Kingdom
- Post town: Acharacle
- Postcode district: PH36 4
- Police: Scotland
- Fire: Scottish
- Ambulance: Scottish
- Scottish Parliament: Skye, Lochaber and Badenoch

Kilchoan (Scottish Gaelic: Cille Chòmhain) is a village on the Scottish peninsula of Ardnamurchan, beside the Sound of Mull in Lochaber, Highland. It is the most westerly village in mainland Britain, although several tiny hamlets lie further west on the peninsula (of these, the most westerly is called Portuairk). The western linear, coastal parts of the village are Ormsaigmore and Ormsaigbeg.

Kilchoan has a population of about 150 people.

== History ==
M.E.M. Donaldson equates "Buarblaig" (now Bourblaige about three miles (five kilometres) east of Kilchoan on the other side of the eastern mountain of Ben Hiant at 528 metres (1,732 feet), grid reference NM546623) with Muribulg, where the Annals of Tigernach record a battle between the Picts and Dalriads in 731 AD. It may also be the 'Muirbole Paradisi' mentioned by Adomnán.

For many years following the 1688 overthrow and exile of the House of Stuart, the historic parish church at Kilchoan, which was dedicated to Saint Comgan and which is now in ruins, was a Non-juring Episcopal parish within the Church of Scotland.

== Landmarks ==
The ancient Mingary Castle is on the coast about 1 km east of the village.

Examples of a type of igneous rock structure called a cone sheet are found at Kilchoan.

Below the slope north-west of the village street is a chambered cairn, Greadal Fhinn.

Ben Hiant is the highest point of the peninsula at 528 m and lies between the village and the coastal hamlet of Ardslignish.

== Tourism and amenities ==
=== Transport ===
A regular CalMac ferry service runs from Kilchoan to Tobermory on the Isle of Mull. To and from the regional centre of Fort William, one bus per day Monday to Saturday connects with the ferry via Salen and the Corran Ferry (Note: The route is 50 km long, and passes beside Loch Sunart, Glen Tarbert and Loch Linnhe)

Preceding station	Caledonian MacBrayne	Following station
Tobermory Terminus	Tobermory–Kilchoan ferry	Terminus

=== Kilchoan Bay ===
Kilchoan Bay has four visitor moorings, a ferry jetty, a shop with a post office, (Note: This shop was once run by author Jon Haylett) showers and a petrol station.

=== Hospitality ===
The Kilchoan House Hotel is now the most westerly bar/hotel on the mainland of the UK, after the closure of Sonachan Hotel.

Ardnamurchan Campsite, Kilchoan. (Note: About 500m west of the centre)

== Geology ==
The minerals kilchoanite, dellaite and rustumite were first found at Kilchoan. A natural history museum is adjacent to the hamlet to the east at the coastal hamlet of Glenmore.

== Notable residents ==
- Hamza Yassin, cameraman and Strictly Come Dancing champion.
