= Ardtoe =

Coordinates: 56.768°N 05.88247°W

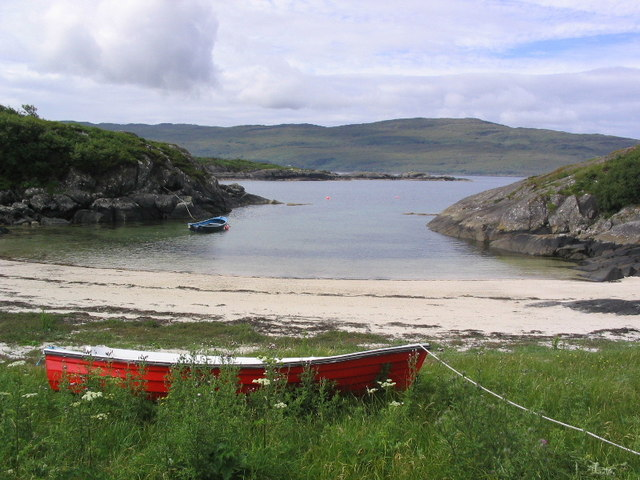
- Beach at Ardtoe

- Location within the Lochaber area
- OS grid reference: NM6270
- Council area: Highland
- Country: Scotland
- Sovereign state: United Kingdom
- Post town: ACHARACLE
- Postcode district: PH36
- Dialling code: 01967
- Police: Scotland
- Fire: Scottish
- Ambulance: Scottish
- UK Parliament: Ross, Skye and Lochaber
- Scottish Parliament: Skye, Lochaber and Badenoch

Ardtoe (Scottish Gaelic: Àird Tobha) is a place on the coast of Ardnamurchan, Lochaber, in the Highland council area of Scotland. It has sandy beaches with views to the island of Eigg. Ardtoe is situated at the head of the channel, which connects Kentra Bay to the sea. It is three miles (five kilometres) northwest of Acharacle. There is a Sea Fish Marine Unit of the Sea Fish Industry Authority located there.
