= Ockle =

Coordinates: 56.761°N 6.002°W

Ockle: Scottish Gaelic: Ocal
- Location within the Lochaber area
- OS grid reference: NM555705
- Council area: Highland
- Lieutenancy area: Inverness
- Country: Scotland
- Sovereign state: United Kingdom
- Post town: ACHARACLE
- Postcode district: PH36
- Dialling code: 01972
- Police: Scotland
- Fire: Scottish
- Ambulance: Scottish
- UK Parliament: Ross, Skye and Lochaber
- Scottish Parliament: Inverness East, Nairn and Lochaber

Ockle (Scottish Gaelic: Ocal) is a hamlet situated on the northcoast of the Ardnamurchan peninsula, Scottish Highlands and is in the Scottish council area of Highland.

Ockle lies six miles (ten kilometres) northeast of Kilchoan on the southern coast of the peninsula. The public road ends in Ockle.

There is a 7 1/2-mile-long (12-kilometre) footpath running between Ockle (NM555704) and the public road at Arivegaig (NM651677) (2 1/2 mi or 4 km from Acharacle)

The current population of Ockle is 3.
