= Jon Haylett =

Jon Haylett is a novelist born in Dar-es-Salaam (in what was Tanganyika Territory). He moved to Mombasa, Kenya in 1950 but was educated in England from the age of nine. He gained a degree at Keele University and a PGCE at Bristol University before returning to Africa to teach. On his return he went back to Bernard Mizeki College.

The author then returned from Africa to teach in Maldon, Essex before retiring in 1996 to run a shop and post-office in Kilchoan on the peninsula of Ardnamurchan in north-west Scotland, and pursue writing. In 2003, he won the Bridport Prize for his short story, "The Crossing".

Haylett relied solely on the internet in sending his manuscripts to publishers. His first novel, Cry of the Justice Bird was published in 2007 by Essex's PaperBooks, who signed Haylett to a three-book deal. The novel is an action/adventure thriller based in the fictional African state of Boromundi.
