= Pawdite =

In petrology, pawdite is a dark-colored, fine-grained, granular hypabyssal rock composed of magnetite, titanite, biotite, hornblende, calcic plagioclase, and traces of quartz. It is a hornblende–quartz diabase.
