= Alasdair Maclean =

Scottish poet and diarist, 1926–1994

Alasdair Maclean (1926–1994) was a Scottish poet and writer, born in Glasgow. Extracts from his diary provide an account of Scottish crofting life.

== Employment and university ==
Maclean left school at 14 and took a variety of mainly labouring jobs. He spent his National Service in India and Malaya, and lived for ten years in Canada. From 1966 to 1970 he attended the University of Edinburgh as a mature student and graduated with an MA in English.

== Writings ==
Maclean began writing poetry at the age of 20, doing so sporadically until 1966. His work appeared in Transatlantic Review and Scottish Poetry. His first book of poems, From the Wilderness, was the Poetry Book Society Choice for 1973.

Extracts from his diary appear alongside those of his father, Ian Maclean (1898–1973), in Night Falls on Ardnamurchan. The book gives a humorous, perceptive and moving account of the Scottish crofting life.

== Awards ==
- Scottish Arts Council New Writing Award
- Duff Cooper Memorial Prize
- Cholmondeley Award

== Books ==
- Poetry Introduction 2. Faber & Faber. 1972. pp. 37–46. ISBN 0571097898.
- Maclean, Alasdair (1973). From the Wilderness. Victor Gollancz. ISBN 0-575-01807-0.
- Maclean, Alasdair (1976). Waking the Dead. Victor Gollancz. ISBN 0-575-02203-5.
- Maclean, Alasdair (1984). Night Falls on Ardnamurchan: The Twilight of a Crofting Family. Victor Gollancz. ISBN 0-575-03460-2.
