= Hannah Cobb =

Archaeologist

Hannah Cobb FSA FSA Scot MCIfA
- Awards: National Teaching Fellowship (2022)

Academic background
- Education: University of Edinburgh (MA); University of Manchester (PhD)
- Thesis: Media for movement and making the world : an examination of the Mesolithic experience of the world and the Mesolithic to Neolithic transition in the northern Irish Sea basin (2008)

Academic work
- Discipline: Archaeology; Pedagogy
- Institutions: University of Manchester
- Website: hannahcobbarchaeology.wordpress.com

Hannah Cobb FSA FSA Scot MCIfA is an archaeologist at the University of Manchester, noted for her work on pedagogy, post-humanist theory, and diversity and equality in archaeology.

== Education ==
Cobb was educated at the University of Edinburgh and the University of Manchester where she was awarded a PhD in 2008.

== Career and research ==
Cobb is a Professor of Archaeology and Pedagogy at the University of Manchester. Her research focuses on the Mesolithic archaeology of north-west Europe, archaeological pedagogy, and equality and diversity in archaeology. Cobb has co-edited several monographs, including Investigating the Role of Fieldwork in Teaching and Learning Archaeology and Reconsidering Archaeological Fieldwork. Her work on archaeological pedagogy is strongly influenced by Manuel DeLanda and assemblage theory.

Cobb was the Founder and chair of the Chartered Institute for Archaeologists (CIFA) Equality & Diversity Group (2015-2021), and founded the EveryDigSexism Project. She also co-directs the Whitworth Park Community Archaeology and History project.

=== Selected publications ===
Cobb's publications include:

- Investigating prehistoric hunter-gatherer identities: case studies from Palaeolithic and Mesolithic Europe
- Straight down the line? A queer consideration of hunter-gatherer studies in north-west Europe
- Croucher, Karina, Hannah L. Cobb, and Ange Brennan. 2008. Investigating the role of fieldwork in teaching and learning archaeology. Higher Education Academy, Subject Centre for History, Classics and Archaeology.
- Reconsidering archaeological fieldwork: exploring on-site relationships between theory and practice
- Assembling archaeological pedagogy. A theoretical framework for valuing pedagogy in archaeological interpretation and practice
- Archaeology: An Introduction
- Personal, political, pedagogic: challenging the binary bind in archaeological teaching, learning and fieldwork

=== Awards and honours ===
Cobb was awarded a National Teaching Fellowship from Advance HE in 2022. She is also a Member of the Chartered Institute for Archaeologists and a Senior Fellow of the Higher Education Academy. She was elected as a Fellow of the Society of Antiquaries of London (FSA) in 2016 and the Society of Antiquaries of Scotland (FSA Scot). The Ardnamurchan Transitions Project, which Cobb co-directs, was awarded the 2014 Archaeology Training Forum (ATF) Training Award.
