= Laga, Lochaber =

Coordinates: 56.678°N 5.858°W

Laga: Scottish Gaelic: Làga
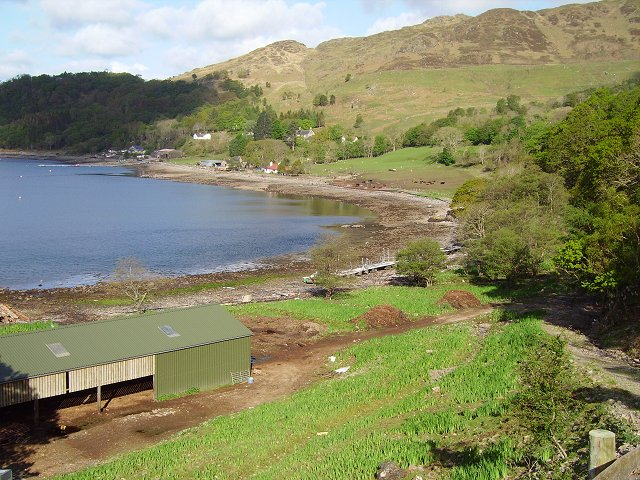
- Laga

- Location within the Lochaber area
- Population: 5 permanent
- OS grid reference: NM638607
- Council area: Highland
- Country: Scotland
- Sovereign state: United Kingdom
- Post town: Acharacle
- Postcode district: PH36 4JW
- Dialling code: 0044 (0) 1972 500
- Police: Scotland
- Fire: Scottish
- Ambulance: Scottish

Laga (Scottish Gaelic: Làga) is a hamlet on the north shore of Loch Sunart near Acharacle, in Lochaber, in the Highlands of Scotland and is in the council area of Highland.
