= Murlagan =

Hamlet in Highland, Scotland

Coordinates: 56.97841°N 5.27245°W

- Location within the Highland council area
- OS grid reference: NN012922
- Council area: Highland
- Country: Scotland
- Sovereign state: United Kingdom
- Post town: Roy Bridge
- Postcode district: PH31
- Police: Scotland
- Fire: Scottish
- Ambulance: Scottish

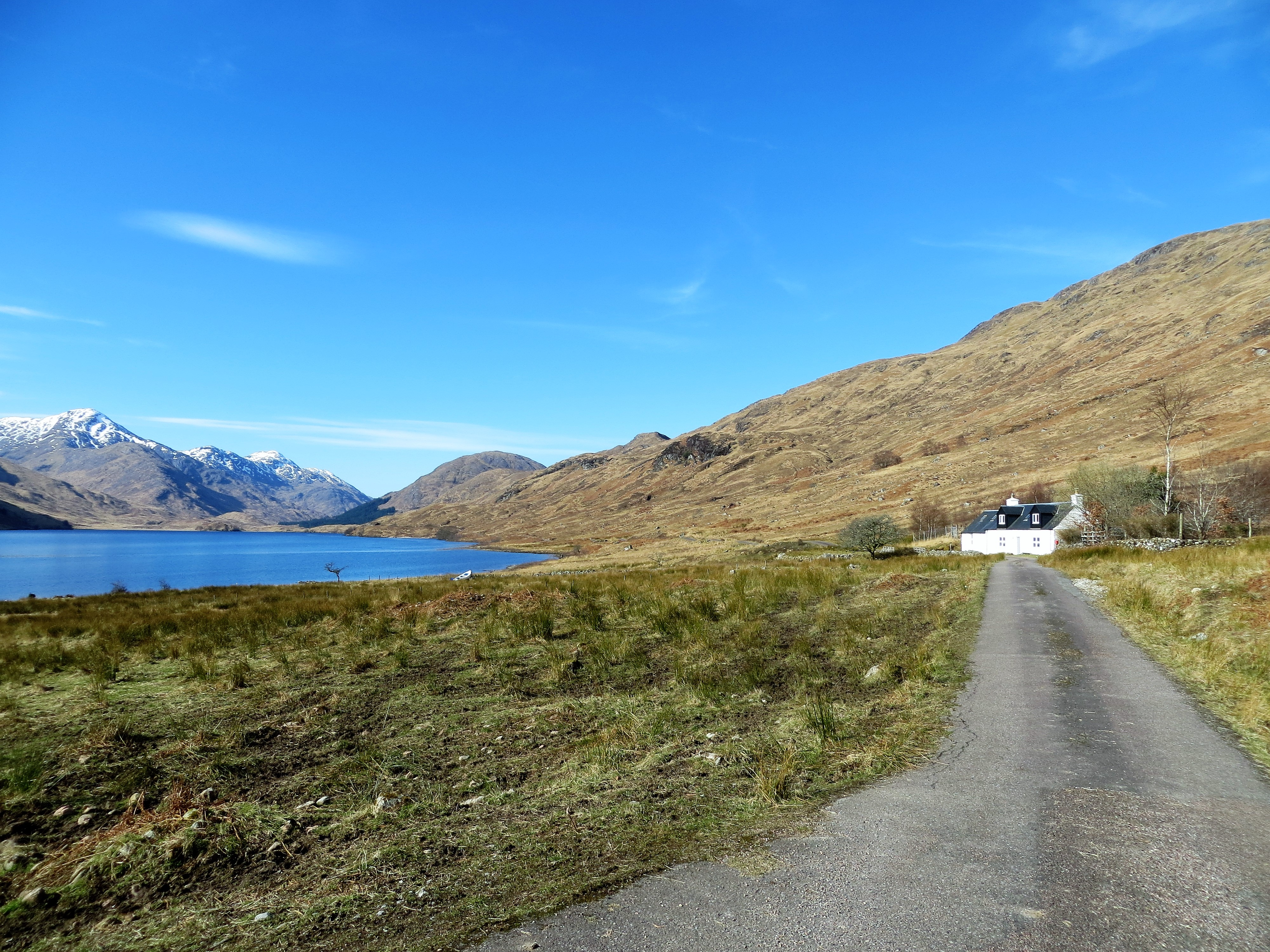

Murlagan is a small hamlet located on the north shore of Loch Arkaig in Inverness-shire, Scottish Highlands and is in the Scottish council area of Highland. Murlagan, also called Murlaggan and Mhurlagain, is the location of the minor seat of Clan MacMillan.

== History ==
The Murlagan, chief of Clan MacMillan was tacksman to Cameron of Lochiel.

The progenitor of this branch was Alexander, second son of John MacMillan, possessor of Glenpeanmore. According to family tradition, he and his brothers were out during the '45. It is also a family tradition that he and Doctor Archibald Cameron of Lochiel hid the Prince's gold at the Callich burn while the Hanoverian troops were hot on their heels coming from Murlaggan private burial-ground where they hid it for a time among loose soil from a newly opened grave. – Bygone Lochaber, Somerled MacMillan (1971)

Many generations of these MacMillans served the Camerons of Lochiel and worked land on Loch Arkaig, below the Mountain called Murlagan at the inland end of Loch Arkaig, which is near Fort William in the highlands of Scotland.

John the (Seventh?) of Murlagan resisted Bonny Prince Charlie's attempt in 1745 for the British throne although his two sons went out in support of the prince under Cameron of Locheil, and one died at Culloden, the other rescued the prince and the last skirmish of the 1745 rebellion against the House of Hanover was on the land and policies of Murlagan, where French gold to fund the rebellion was rumoured buried, as the remnants scattered into hiding and the Prince went on his secret journey to the Isle of Skye and exile in France and into legend.

== Emigration ==
Many MacMillans and relatives left Loch Arkaig for a new beginning and went to Canada in 1802, and their descendants returned in 2002 to raise a cairn at Murlagan during "The Great Return".

Archibald MacMillan of Murlaganand and Allan MacMillan of Glenpean, along with 200 clansmen, emigrated to Canada about the year 1802. Murlagan settled in Montreal where he was engaged in mercantile pursuits. Shortly after his arrival in Canada he applied to the Governor General for land for himself and the majority of those who accompanied him. After several court attendances on the Governor at Quebec, he obtained two and a quarter townships, namely those of Suffolk, Templeton and Grenville on the banks of the River Ottawa. – The MacMillans and their Septs, Somerled MacMillan (1952)
