= Achnaha =

Coordinates: 56°44′06″N 06°08′55″W

Achnaha (Scottish Gaelic: Achadh na h-Àtha) is a remote village in Ardnamurchan, Lochaber, in the Scottish council area of Highland.

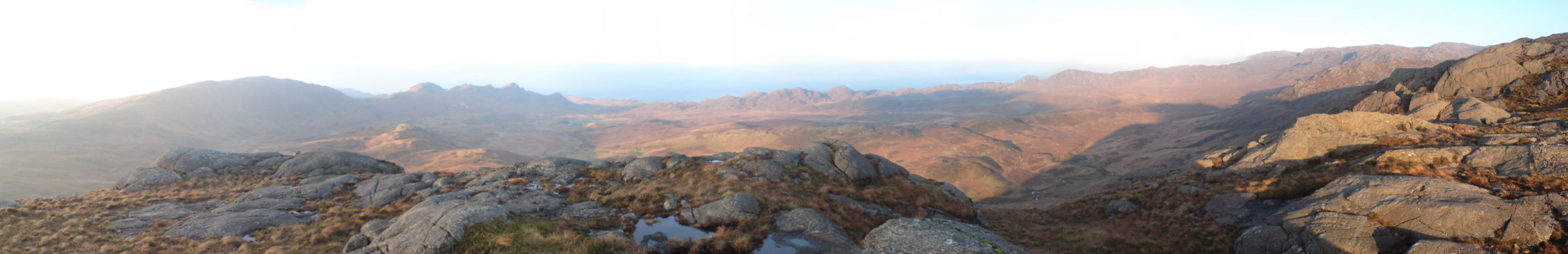
View of the volcanic crater overlooking Achnaha

One of the local tourist attractions is the remnant of an old volcano, which has weathered down to the level of the old magma chamber, from which three eruptions originated.

The ring of the old cone of the volcano can clearly be seen using Google maps.
