= Skye of Curr =

Hamlet in Scotland

Coordinates: 57.30084°N 3.66664°W

Skye of Curr: Scottish Gaelic: Sgiath Churr
- Location within the Badenoch and Strathspey area
- OS grid reference: NH996245
- Council area: Highland
- Country: Scotland
- Sovereign state: United Kingdom
- Post town: Grantown-on-Spey
- Postcode district: PH26 3
- Police: Scotland
- Fire: Scottish
- Ambulance: Scottish

Skye of Curr (Scottish Gaelic: Sgiath Churr) is a hamlet, situated 3 miles (5 kilometres) southwest of Grantown-on-Spey, in the Highlands of Scotland and is in the council area of Highland.

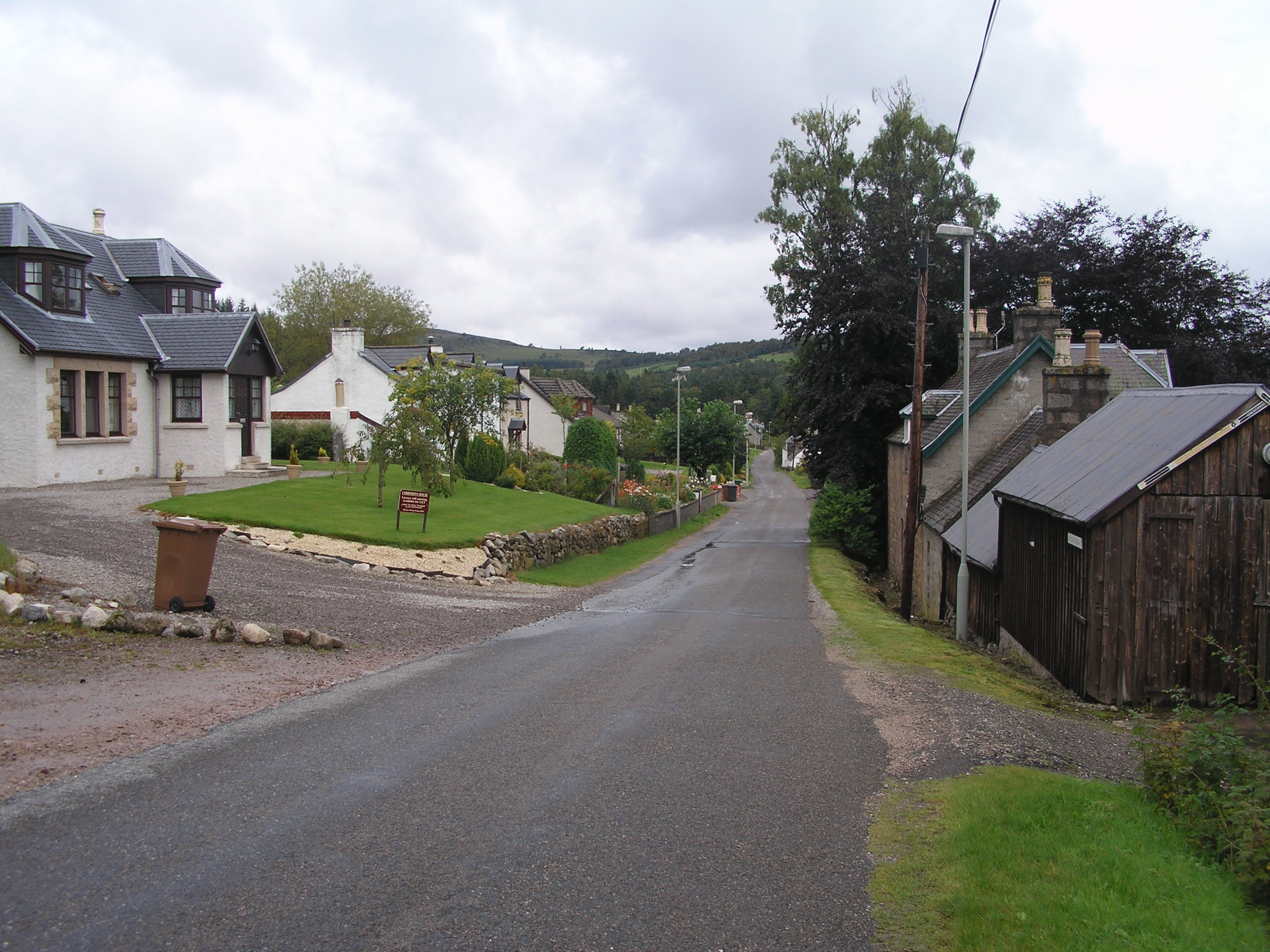
Skye of Curr
