= Bun Abhainn Eadarra =

Coordinates: 57.934°N 6.852°W

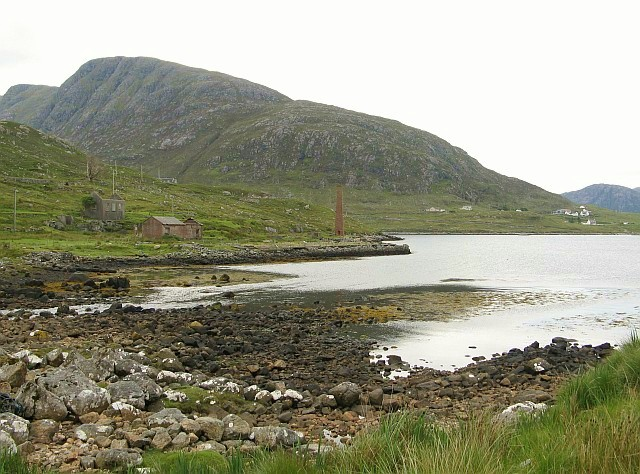
- The remains of the whaling station at Bun Abhainn Eadarra

- Location within the Outer Hebrides
- Language: Scottish Gaelic; English
- OS grid reference: NB128041
- Civil parish: Harris
- Council area: Na h-Eileanan Siar
- Lieutenancy area: Western Isles
- Country: Scotland
- Sovereign state: United Kingdom
- Post town: ISLE OF HARRIS
- Postcode district: HS3
- Dialling code: 01859
- Police: Scotland
- Fire: Scottish
- Ambulance: Scottish
- UK Parliament: Na h-Eileanan an Iar
- Scottish Parliament: Na h-Eileanan an Iar

Bun Abhainn Eadarra or Bunavoneadar is a hamlet adjacent to the Loch Bun Abhainn Eadarra, on the south shore of North Harris, in the Outer Hebrides, Scotland. It is connected with Harris's main port, Tarbert, by the B887 road which joins the A859 at Ardhasaig. Bunavoneadar is within the parish of Harris.

== History ==
Bun Abhainn Eadarra is notable for containing the remains of an historic whaling station which was founded by a Norwegian, Carl Herlofsen, in 1904. The company was operational until 1914 and again from 1918 to 1922, when it was bought by Lever Brothers, the company founded and run by William Lever, 1st Viscount Leverhulme, the Isle of Lewis's proprietor. The machines were renewed and three ships for whaling in the North Atlantic were bought. The main product was whale oil, which was used in making soap and margarine and also for lighting and lubricants. Shortly before closure of the site in 1929, a building was added to smoke whalemeat for sale in the Congo. The station reopened for a brief period in the 1950s. The whaling station is the only remaining example of an early 20th century shore-based whaling station in the UK, and it was designated as an ancient scheduled monument by Historic Scotland in 1992.
