= East Croachy =

Coordinates: 57.31976°N 4.24227°W

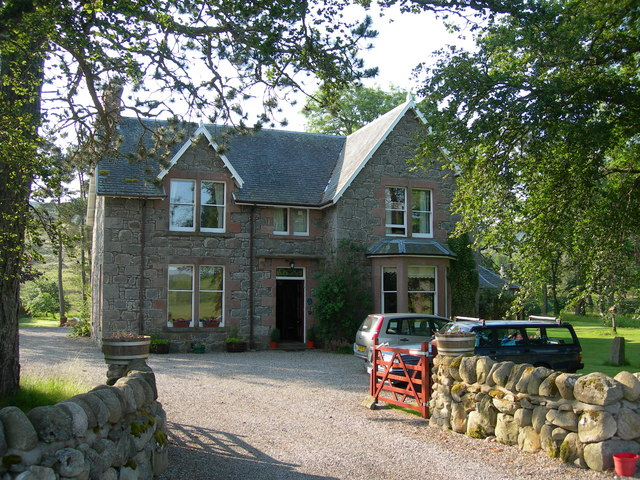

- Location within the Inverness area
- OS grid reference: NH650276
- Council area: Highland
- Country: Scotland
- Sovereign state: United Kingdom
- Post town: Inverness
- Postcode district: IV2 6
- Police: Scotland
- Fire: Scottish
- Ambulance: Scottish

East Croachy is a small hamlet in the Highland council area, in the Highlands of Scotland. It is located 1 mile (1.6 km) east of Loch Ruthven, and 5 miles (8.0 km) southeast of Dores, in Strathnairn. The B851 road passes through it. St Paul's Episcopal Church, known as "the grouse church" because of increased attendances during the grouse shooting season, is located in East Croachy. The Steadings Hotel is approximately 0.5 miles (0.80 km) to the northeast. Also nearby is Tomintoul House, a B listed house built by architect William Robertson in 1841.
