= Cone sheet =

Type of igneous intrusion of subvolcanic rock

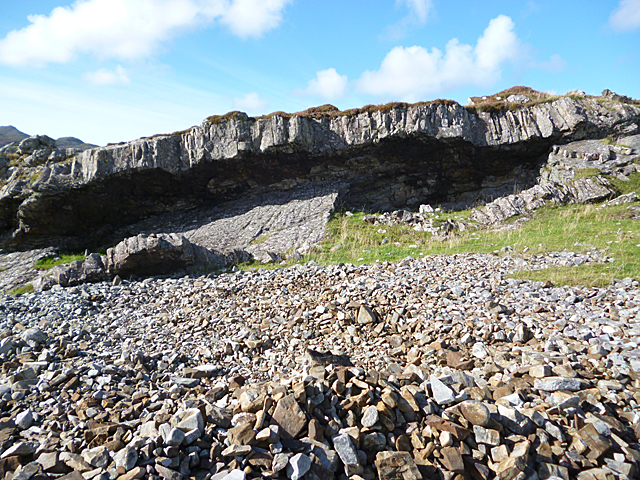
A cone sheet at Mingary, Ardnamurchan, Scotland

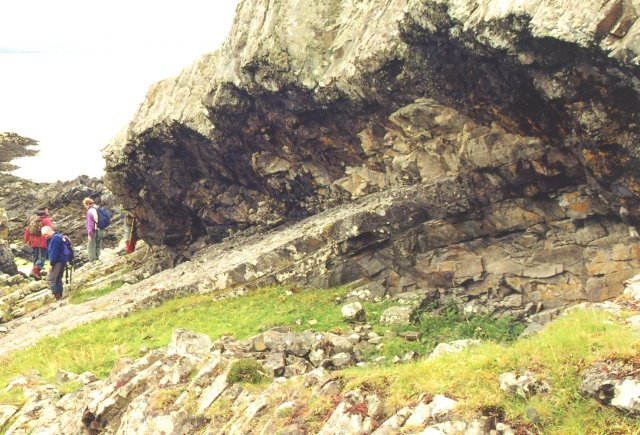
Closer view of a cone sheet at Mingary, Ardnamurchan

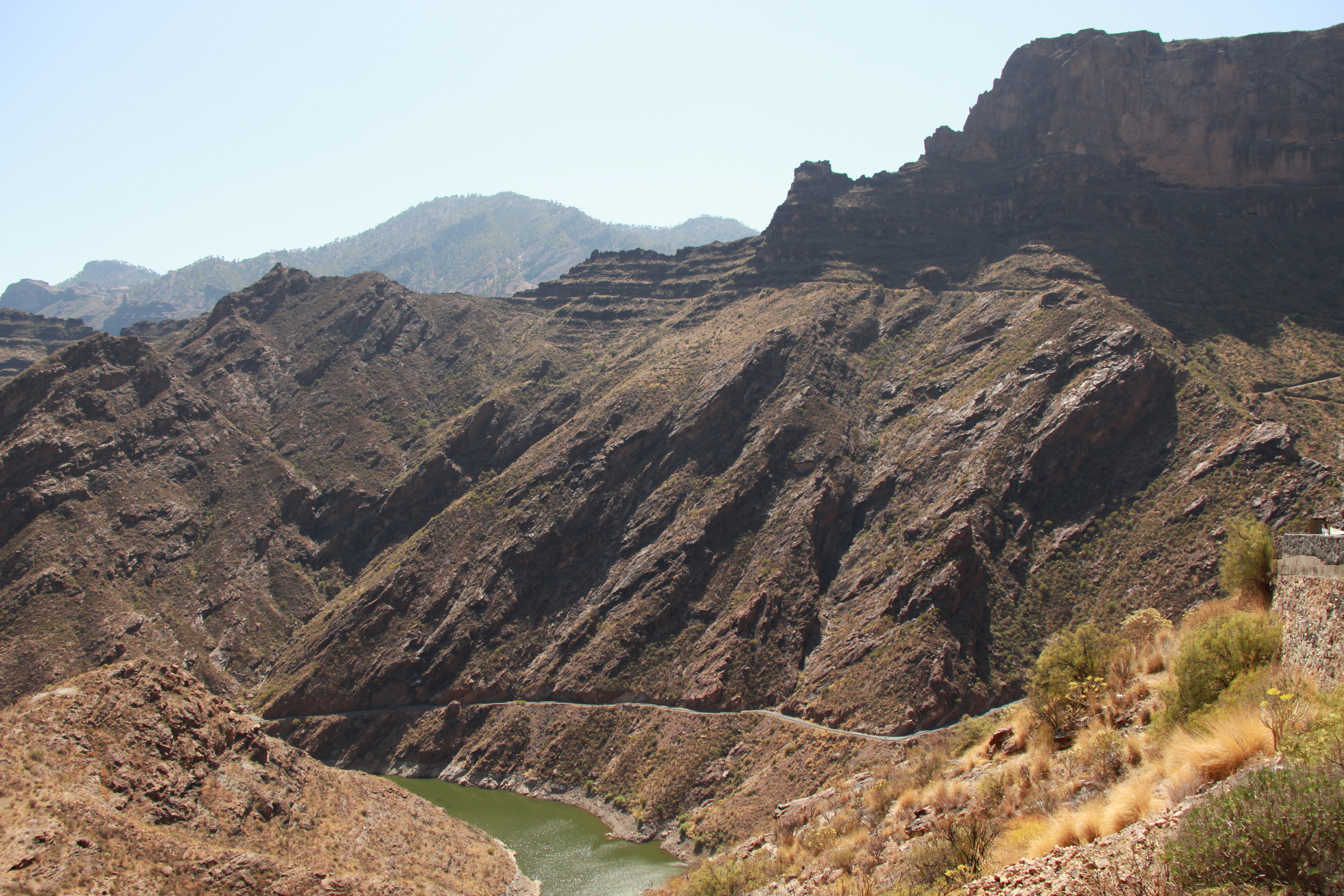
Tejeda cone sheets on Gran Canaria. The lower two-thirds of the photo shows the Tejeda cone sheet swarm of Miocene age; the cone sheets dip down towards the bottom left. The cone sheets are overlain by Pliocene flat-lying lava flows and pyroclastic rocks.

A cone sheet is a type of high-level igneous intrusion of subvolcanic rock, found in partly eroded central volcanic complexes. Cone sheets are relatively thin inclined sheets, generally just a few metres thick, with the geometry of a downward-pointing cone. Viewed from above, their outcrop is typically circular to elliptical. They were originally described from the Ardnamurchan, Mull and other central complexes of the British Tertiary Volcanic Province (now recognised as part of the North Atlantic Igneous Province).

== Occurrence ==
Cone sheets are widely distributed at the lower levels of volcanic complexes.

Examples of cone sheet complexes
Name	Location	Age	Dominant rock type	Reference
Ardnamurchan	Scotland	Paleogene	dolerite	
Tejeda	Gran Canaria	Miocene	trachyte, phonolite	
Vallehermoso	La Gomera	Miocene	trachyte, phonolite	
Jabal Arknu	Libya	Tertiary		
Otoge	Japan	Miocene	alkali basalt, trachyandesite	
Zarza	Mexico	Cretaceous	gabbro	
Houshihushan	China	Cretaceous	granite porphyry	
Boa Vista	Cape Verde	Miocene	phonolite	
Ruri Hills	Kenya	Miocene	carbonatite	
Bagstowe	Queensland	late Paleozoic	rhyolite	
Thverartindur	Iceland	Pliocene		
Tehilla	Sudan	Cambrian–Ordovician	granite, monzonite	

== Formation ==
Soon after cone sheets were first described, their formation was explained in terms of intrusion along conical fractures extending from the top of an intrusive body into the overlying rocks, caused by high magmatic pressure.
