= Subvolcanic rock =

Medium-grained intrusive rock

A subvolcanic rock, also known as a hypabyssal rock, is an intrusive igneous rock that is emplaced at depths less than 2 km (1.2 mi) within the crust, and has intermediate grain size and often porphyritic texture between that of volcanic rocks, which are extrusive igneous rocks, and plutonic rocks, which form much deeper in the ground. Subvolcanic rocks include diabase (also known as dolerite), porphyry, quartz dolerite, and microgranite.

== See also ==
- Cone sheet
- Dike (geology)
- Igneous intrusion
- Sill (geology)
