= Salen, Ardnamurchan =

Coordinates: 56.71586°N 5.77477°W

Salen: Scottish Gaelic: An Sàilean
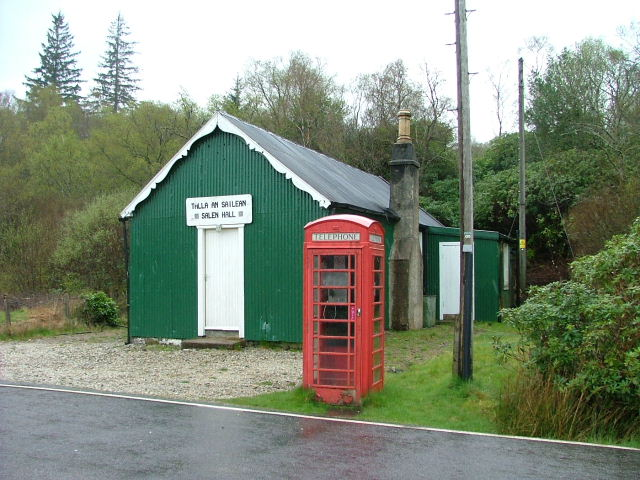
- Salen Village Hall

- Location within the Lochaber area
- Population: 74 (2011)
- OS grid reference: NM691646
- Council area: Highland
- Country: Scotland
- Sovereign state: United Kingdom
- Post town: Acharacle
- Postcode district: PH36 4
- Police: Scotland
- Fire: Scottish
- Ambulance: Scottish

Salen (Scottish Gaelic: An Sàilean) is a coastal village on the Ardnamurchan peninsula, overlooking Salen Bay which is an inlet of the sea loch, Loch Sunart. Located in the Scottish council area of Highland, it is on the road to Ardnamurchan Point, the most westerly point of mainland Britain.

== Etymology ==
Salen is from the Scottish Gaelic Sàilean, meaning "small inlet. Many of the local names relate to the Viking Age such as Sunart, which is derived from Suaineart meaning "Svein's fjord" and Acharacle originally meaning "Torquil's field". This is evidence of the Scandinavian occupation of much of northern and western Scotland from the 9th century. Somerled, who founded the Lordship of the Isles, may have hailed from the area.

== History ==
In the 1990s the restoration of the oak woodland surrounding Salen began and the area was proposed as a Special Area of Conservation. There are many local walks where evidence of human activity going back to the Stone Age can be found. Salen has for centuries been one of Loch Sunart's safest anchorages. The stone pier was built when Salen was one of the main ports in the 19th century visited by steamers and other vessels. In 2011 the facilities at the pier were enhanced with a nine berth pontoon.

The Salen Hotel was built by C.D. Rudd, the diamond millionaire, who along with Cecil Rhodes each bought a quarter share of De Beers gold mine and diamond fields.

During the Second World War, due to the remoteness and ease with which the peninsula could be cut off, the entire area was used for Special Forces military training. The foundations of military buildings can be seen in Salen Village and evidence of training in the form of spent cartridges can be found on local walks.

== See also ==
- Scandinavian Scotland
