= Acharacle =

Village in Lochaber, Scotland

Coordinates: 56.745°N 5.802°W

Acharacle: Scottish Gaelic: Àth Tharracail
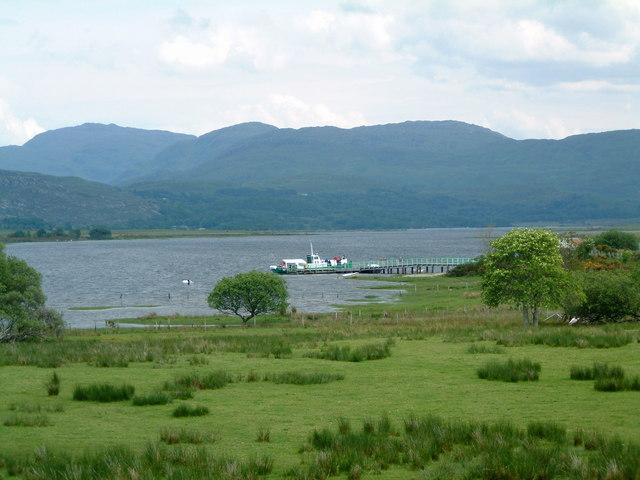
- Acharacle Pier and Loch Shiel

- Location within the Lochaber area
- Population: 201
- OS grid reference: NM678679
- Council area: Highland
- Lieutenancy area: Inverness
- Country: Scotland
- Sovereign state: United Kingdom
- Post town: ACHARACLE
- Postcode district: PH36
- Dialling code: 01967
- Police: Scotland
- Fire: Scottish
- Ambulance: Scottish
- UK Parliament: Argyll, Bute and South Lochaber
- Scottish Parliament: Skye, Lochaber and Badenoch

Acharacle (/əˈhærəkəl/; Scottish Gaelic: Àth Tharracail, "Torquil's ford") is a village on the landward end of the Ardnamurchan peninsula in the Scottish Highlands, at the foot of Loch Shiel. The ford referred to in the name spans the River Shiel, and, according to legend, was the site of a battle between Somerled and a Norwegian warrior named Torquil.
