= Ardnamurchan =

Peninsula in Lochaber, Scotland

Ardnamurchan Àird nam Murchan (Scottish Gaelic)
- Peninsula
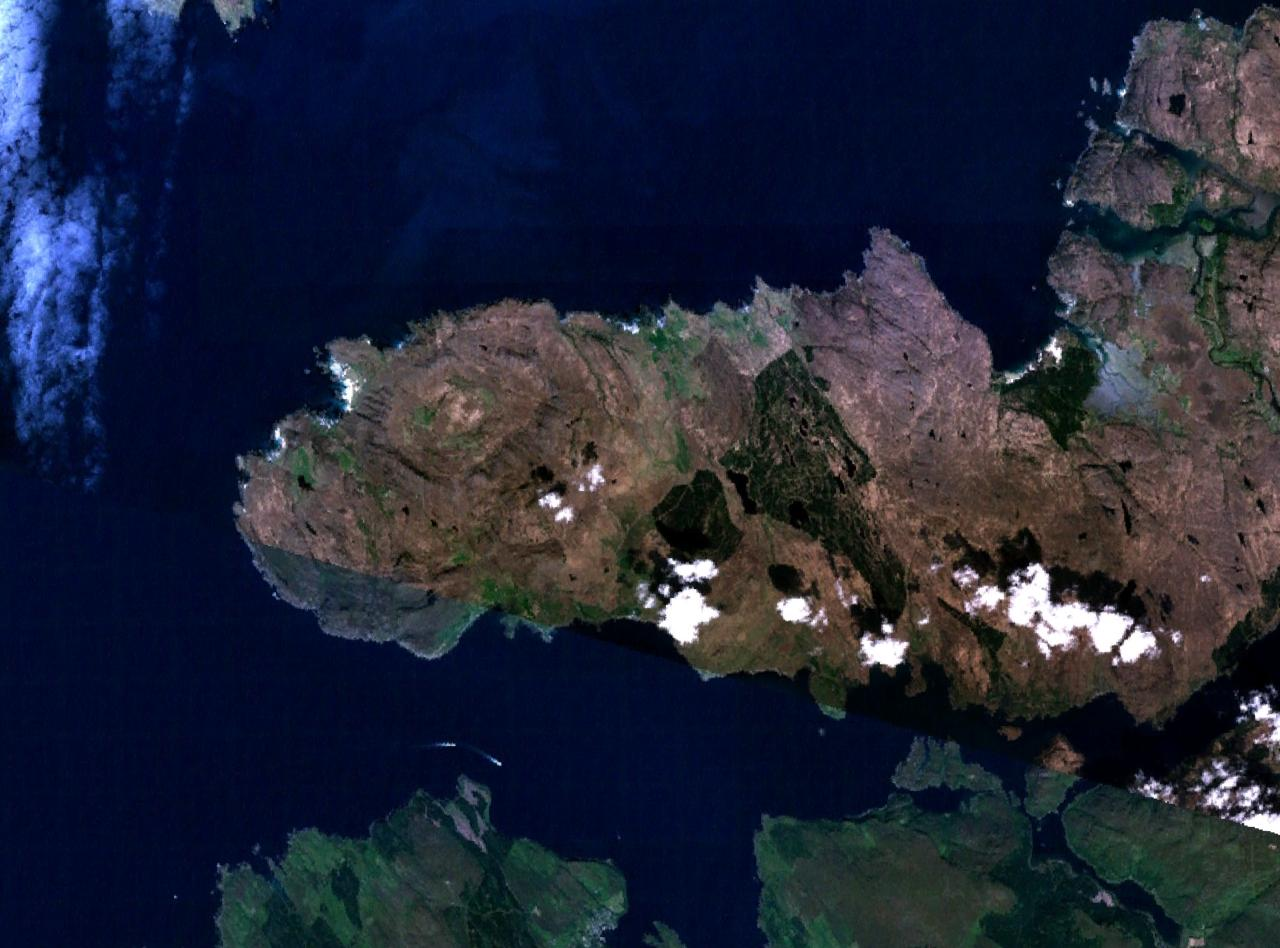
- Satellite photo of Ardnamurchan

- Location within Scotland
- Coordinates: 56°44′N 5°59′W
- Grid position: NM 56462 67273
- Location: Lochaber; Highland; Scotland

Ardnamurchan (/ˌɑːrdnəˈmɜːrxən/, Scottish Gaelic: Àird nam Murchan [aːrˠʃtʲ nə ˈmuɾuxan]) is a 50-square-mile (130-square-kilometre) peninsula in the ward management area of Lochaber, Highland, Scotland, noted for its remoteness and rural nature. Its remoteness is accentuated by the main access route being a single track road for much of its length. The most westerly point of mainland Great Britain, Corrachadh Mòr, is in Ardnamurchan.

The area was historically ruled by the Clan MacDonald of Ardnamurchan from the 1300s until 1618.

From 1930 to 1975 Ardnamurchan also gave its name to a landward district of Argyll, which covered a much wider area, including the districts of Morvern, Sunart and Ardgour.

== Geography ==
Strictly speaking, Ardnamurchan covers only the peninsula beyond the villages of Salen (in the south) and Acharacle (in the north), but nowadays the term is also used more generally to include the neighbouring districts of Sunart, Ardgour, Morvern, and even Moidart (which is part of the county of Inverness-shire, not Argyll).

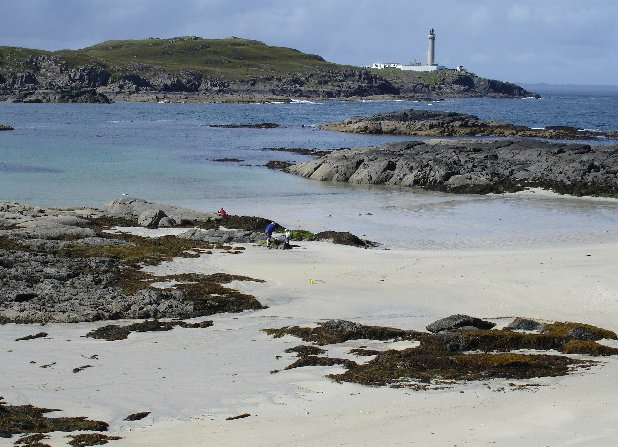
View across Eilean Chaluim Cille Bay to Ardnamurchan Point and lighthouse

Ardnamurchan Point, which has the 36-metre-tall (118 ft) Ardnamurchan Lighthouse built on it, is commonly described as the most westerly point of the British mainland although Corrachadh Mòr, a kilometre to the south, is a few metres farther west.

== Geology ==
The north western corner of Ardnamurchan consists of a lopolith (previously interpreted as a ring dyke) that has been exposed at the surface. Evidence for such a structure can be identified from the phenocrysts in the rock exposures around the area of interest which show plagioclase crystals aligned towards the centre of the complex, an alignment caused by magmatic flow within a lopolith. Relatively small areas of lava that were ejected onto the surface are found in some parts of the peninsula, close to the inner edges of the area of interest. The sub-concentric rings of the geologic structure can easily be seen in satellite photographs and on topographic maps, though they are less obvious on the ground. At least seven other similar complexes of the same tectonic episode exist along the west coast of Britain, and these are popular sites for many university geological training courses.

== History ==
Adomnan of Iona records St Columba visiting the peninsula in the 6th century, and gives the impression that it was settled by Irish Gaels at that time. He records three instances of signs performed by Columba on the peninsula.

Adomnan records in one instance that Columba prophesied to his companions the death of Kings Báetán mac Muirchertaig and Eochaid mac Domnaill before news arrived the same day at a place called 'paradise bay' to tell them the news. In the second instance, which is said to have occurred in an unnamed rocky spot in the interior, the parents of a boy brought their child to Columba to be baptized but no water could be found, and Columba prayed to God and water miraculously came out of a nearby rock and he prophesied that the child would live a sinful life and later be a saint.

In the third instance, which took place at a spot Adomnan called 'Sharp bay', there was a wicked man named Ioan mac Conaill maic Domnaill who was related to the Cenél nGabraín, and this man attacked Columba's friend and plundered his goods. Columba met this wicked man and called on him to repent, but he didn't listen and instead boarded his boat with the stolen goods. Columba then followed the boat, wading into the water up to his knees and prayed to God. He then prophesied to his companions that this man and his boat were going to meet with disaster on the sea, and according to Adomnan, the boat was sunk before reaching land with Ioan drowning at sea along with his stolen goods.

Donaldson identifies "Buarblaig" (now referred to as Bourblaige, about 5 miles (8 kilometres) east of Kilchoan on the other side of Ben Hiant, grid reference NM546623) with Muribulg, where the Annals of Tigernach record a battle between the Picts and the Dalriads in 731. It may also be the 'Muirbole Paradisi' mentioned by Adomnán. Although its stone foundations still remain, the village of Bourblaige no longer exists, as it was destroyed in the Highland Clearances in the early 19th century.

According to early twentieth-century tradition in Ardnamurchan, two battles were fought in the bays between Gortenfern (grid reference NM 608 689) and Sgeir a' Chaolais (grid reference NM 623 702). Archaeological finds in the vicinity of Cul na Croise (grid reference NM 622 698)—a bay between Sgeir a Chaolais and Sgeir nam Meann—consist of spears, daggers, arrow-heads, and a coin dating to the reign of Edward I, King of England. These artefacts could indicate that Cul na Croise was the site of conflict fought in the context of the strife between Edward I's representative, Alasdair Óg Mac Domhnaill, and the Clann Ruaidhrí brothers, Lachlann Mac Ruaidhrí and Ruaidhrí Mac Ruaidhrí. According to tradition, one of the battles fought in the area concerned a certain "Red Rover", and another fought nearby concerned an Irishman named "Duing" or "Dewing". Relics of a Viking ship burial in Cul na Croise have been given to the West Highland Museum at Fort William.

In 2011, a Viking ship burial, probably from the 10th century, was unearthed at Port an Eilean Mhòir on Ardnamurchan. Grave goods buried alongside a Viking warrior found in the boat suggest he was a high-ranking warrior. The Ardnamurchan Viking was found buried with an axe, a sword with a decorated hilt, a spear, a shield boss and a bronze ring pin. Other finds in the 5-metre-long (16-foot) grave in Ardnamurchan included a knife, what could be the tip of a bronze drinking horn, a whetstone from Norway, a ring pin from Ireland and Viking Age pottery.

The area was historically ruled and occupied by clansmen of the Clan MacDonald of Ardnamurchan from the 1300s until 1618 when the Clan Campbell took control of the area.

== Settlements ==
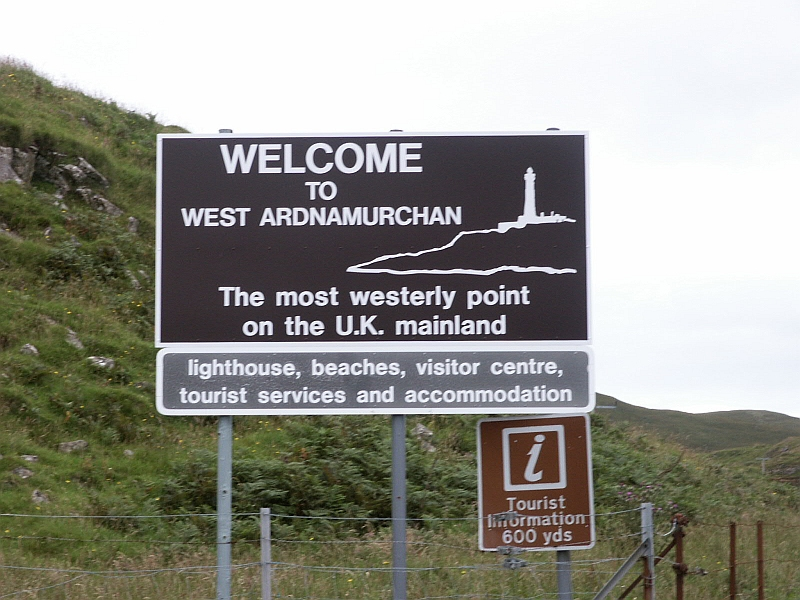
Welcome sign at Kilchoan ferry terminal

The population of the whole peninsula is around 2,000. Historically part of the former county of Argyll, it is now part of the Lochaber ward management area of the Highland local authority.

Villages in Ardnamurchan:

- Acharacle (Àth Tharracail)
- Achnaha (Achadh na h-Àtha)
- Glenborrodale (Gleann Bhorghdail)
- Kilchoan (Cille Chòmhghain)
- Kilmory (Cill Mhóire)
- Laga (Làga)
- Ockle (Ocal)
- Portuairk (Port Uairce)
- Salen (An t-Sàilean)
- Sanna (Sanna)

== Scottish Gaelic ==
Ardnamurchan has one of the highest concentrations of Scottish Gaelic speakers on the mainland, with 19.3% of the local population able to speak the language. The peninsula is also home to an annual Mòd, an eisteddfod-like festival and series of contests celebrating the Gaelic language, its culture, music, and literature.

Ardnamurchan has also been the home to a number of important figures in Scottish Gaelic literature.

Prior to his involvement in the Jacobite rising of 1745, the legendary Gaelic poet Alasdair mac Mhaighstir Alasdair worked as schoolmaster for the Society in Scotland for Propagating Christian Knowledge in Kilchoan, where his father had previously served as Rector for the Jacobite and High Church Non-Juring Anglican Communion.

Dr John MacLachlan, the author of Dìreadh a-mach ri Beinn Shianta, a poem on the Ardnamurchan Clearances, is unusual for his outspoken criticism of the Anglo-Scottish landlords responsible for the evictions. The poem influenced Somhairle MacGill-Eain, who wrote a poem to its author.

== Economy ==
Ardnamurchan distillery is a Scotch whisky distillery located on the peninsula.

== Culture ==
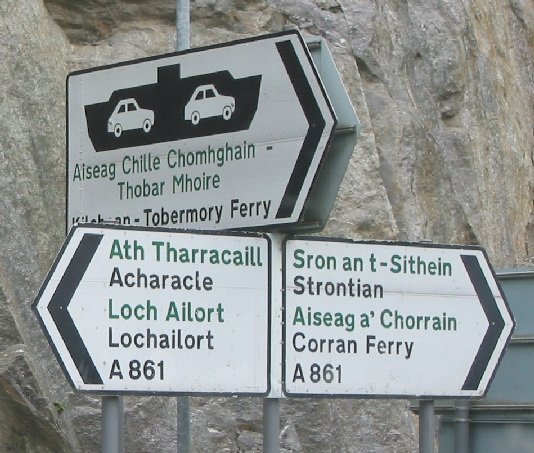
Place names in their original Gaelic are becoming increasingly common on road signs throughout the Scottish Highlands. This sign is located at the top of Salen Brae, in Ardnamurchan.

The peninsula has its own shinty team, Ardnamurchan Camanachd.

== Fauna and scenery ==
Rare species such as the wildcat, pine marten, golden eagle and white-tailed eagle can be seen in Ardnamurchan.

Ardnamurchan is wild and unspoiled. Ardnamurchan Point, adjacent to the most westerly point on the British mainland, has a lighthouse and a view from a sheer rock face of the open Atlantic Ocean. The northern part of Ardnamurchan forms part of the Morar, Moidart and Ardnamurchan National Scenic Area, one of 40 such areas in Scotland, which are defined so as to identify areas of exceptional scenery and to ensure their protection by restricting certain forms of development.

== Notable people ==
- Donald Duff FRSE (1927–98), the geologist bought a house there after surveying the area in the 1950s.
- J. Douglas MacMillan (1933–1991), the minister and preacher came from Ardnamurchan.
- Fergie MacDonald 1(937–2024), the button box accordion player was from the area.
- Hamza Yassin (born 1990), the cameraman, CBeebies presenter and Strictly contestant has lived in the area for 12 years

== See also ==
- List of listed buildings in Ardnamurchan
