= PH postcode area =

Postcode area within the United Kingdom

Perth
- Postcode area
- Coordinates: 56.569°N 3.734°W
- Country: United Kingdom
- Postcode area: PH
- Postcode area name: Perth
- Post towns: 31
- Postcode districts: 43
- Postcode sectors: 61
- Postcodes (live): 6,076
- Postcodes (total): 7,384
- Statistics as at May 2020

The PH postcode area, also known as the Perth postcode area, is a group of 43 postcode districts for post towns: Aberfeldy, Acharacle, Arisaig, Auchterarder, Aviemore, Ballachulish, Blairgowrie, Boat of Garten, Carrbridge, Corrour, Crieff, Dalwhinnie, Dunkeld, Fort Augustus, Fort William, Glenfinnan, Grantown-on-Spey, Invergarry, Isle of Canna, Isle of Eigg, Isle of Rum, Kingussie, Kinlochleven, Lochailort, Mallaig, Nethy Bridge, Newtonmore, Perth, Pitlochry, Roy Bridge and Spean Bridge in Scotland.

The main post town of Perth and its surrounding villages are covered in PH1 (north and west) and PH2 (east and south). PH3 to PH7 cover the Strathearn area to the west and south-west of Perth. PH8 to PH10 and PH15 to PH18 cover highland areas to the north and north-west. PH11 to PH14 cover lower-lying Strathmore and Carse of Gowrie to the north-east and east.

PH19 to PH26 cover Highland Council areas to north of Drummochter.

PH30 to PH36 cover landward areas around Fort William and the Great Glen, to the west, north and east. PH49 and PH50 lie to the south of Fort William.

PH37 to PH41 cover the remote west coast (including the most western point of the Scottish mainland) to Mallaig. PH42 to PH44 cover the Small Isles archipelago of the Inner Hebrides.

Mail for the PH postcode area is processed at Edinburgh Mail Centre, along with mail for the EH, KY, DD, FK and TD postcode areas.

== Coverage ==
The approximate coverage of the postcode districts:

Postcode district	Post town	Coverage	Local authority area(s)
PH1	PERTH	City centre north and west of the former Post Office, and immediate hinterland villages	Perth and Kinross
PH2	PERTH	City centre south and east of the former Post Office, and immediate hinterland villages	Perth and Kinross
PH3	AUCHTERARDER	Aberuthven	Perth and Kinross
PH4	AUCHTERARDER	Blackford	Perth and Kinross
PH5	CRIEFF	Muthill	Perth and Kinross
PH6	CRIEFF	Comrie, St Fillans, Dunira	Perth and Kinross
PH7	CRIEFF	Crieff, Gilmerton, Madderty	Perth and Kinross
PH8	DUNKELD	Dunkeld, Birnam, Amulree	Perth and Kinross
PH9	PITLOCHRY	Ballinluig, Strathtay, Tulliemet	Perth and Kinross
PH10	BLAIRGOWRIE	Blairgowrie and Rattray, Rattray, Bridge of Cally	Perth and Kinross
PH11	BLAIRGOWRIE	Alyth	Perth and Kinross
PH12	BLAIRGOWRIE	Meigle, Newtyle	Perth and Kinross, Angus
PH13	BLAIRGOWRIE	Coupar Angus,	Perth and Kinross
PH14	PERTH	Inchture, Abernyte	Perth and Kinross
PH15	ABERFELDY	Aberfeldy	Perth and Kinross
PH16	PITLOCHRY	Pitlochry, Strath Tummel, Kinloch Rannoch	Perth and Kinross
PH17	PITLOCHRY	Rannoch, Bridge of Gaur	Perth and Kinross
PH18	PITLOCHRY	Blair Atholl, Calvine, Bridge of Tilt	Perth and Kinross
PH19	DALWHINNIE	Dalwhinnie	Highland
PH20	NEWTONMORE	Newtonmore, Kinloch Laggan, Laggan	Highland
PH21	KINGUSSIE	Kingussie, Insh, Kincraig	Highland
PH22	AVIEMORE	Aviemore	Highland
PH23	CARRBRIDGE	Carrbridge, Bogroy	Highland
PH24	BOAT OF GARTEN	Boat of Garten	Highland
PH25	NETHY BRIDGE	Nethy Bridge	Highland
PH26	GRANTOWN-ON-SPEY	Grantown-on-Spey, Advie, Cromdale, Dulnain Bridge	Highland
PH30	CORROUR	Corrour	Highland
PH31	ROY BRIDGE	Roy Bridge, Murlaggan, Tulloch	Highland
PH32	FORT AUGUSTUS	Fort Augustus, Auchterawe	Highland
PH33	FORT WILLIAM	Fort William	Highland
PH34	SPEAN BRIDGE	Spean Bridge, South Laggan, Achnacarry	Highland
PH35	INVERGARRY	Invergarry	Highland
PH36	ACHARACLE	Acharacle	Highland
PH37	GLENFINNAN	Glenfinnan, Polloch	Highland
PH38	LOCHAILORT	Lochailort, Glenuig, Kinlochmoidart	Highland
PH39	ARISAIG	Arisaig	Highland
PH40	MALLAIG	Morar	Highland
PH41	MALLAIG	Mallaig, Knoydart, Isle of Muck, Isle of Soay	Highland
PH42	ISLE OF EIGG	Isle of Eigg	Highland
PH43	ISLE OF RUM	Isle of Rum	Highland
PH44	ISLE OF CANNA	Isle of Canna	Highland
PH49	BALLACHULISH	Ballachulish	Highland
PH50	KINLOCHLEVEN	Kinlochleven	Highland

Ballachulish and Kinlochleven were originally in the PA area as PA39 and PA40 respectively, before being transferred to the PH area in 1999.

== Map ==
PH postcode area map, showing postcode districts in red and post towns in grey text, with links to nearby AB, DD, FK, G, IV, KY and PA postcode areas.

== See also ==
- Postcode Address File
- List of postcode areas in the United Kingdom
- Centre points of the United Kingdom
- Extreme points of the United Kingdom
