= Ardtornish Bay =

Bay on the Movern peninsula, in Lochaber, Scotland

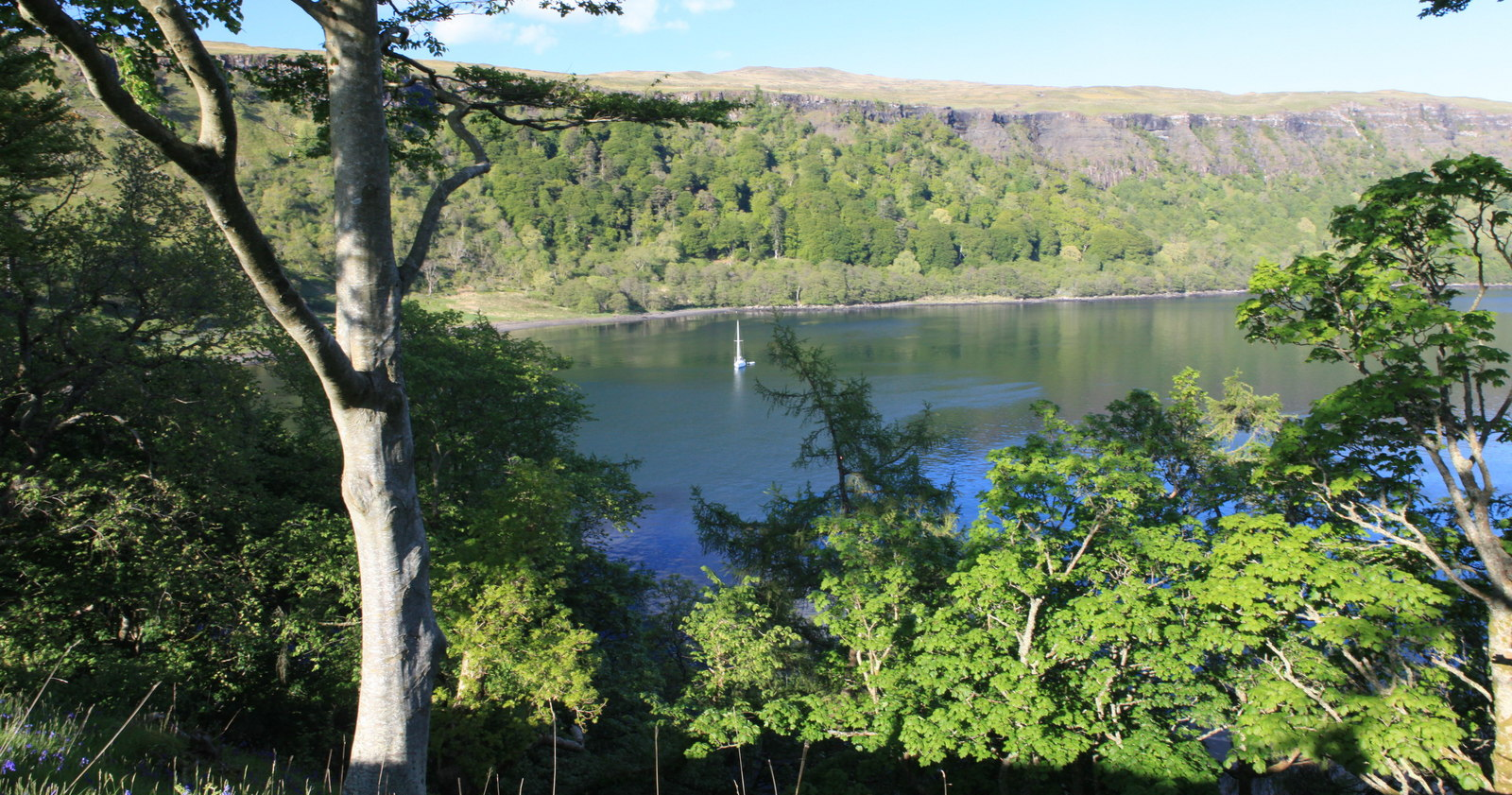
- View over Ardtornish Bay.In the distance you can see the high cliffs of Morvern, it is said that on windy days, the wind is strong enough to blow waterfalls back over the crests of the cliffs.

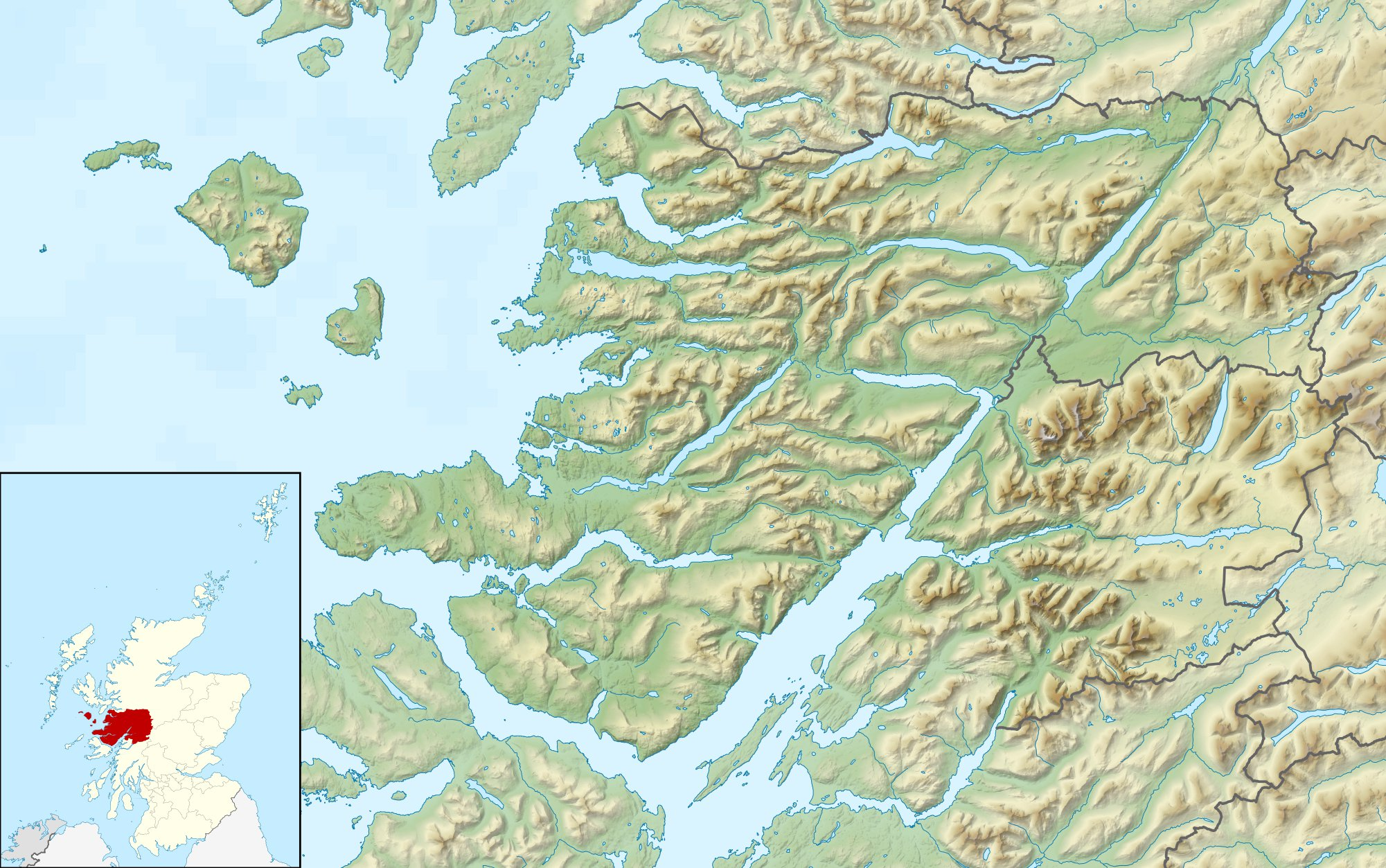
- Location within Lochaber
- Location: Morvern peninsula
- Coordinates: 56.5213°N 5.744161°W
- Type: bay

Ardtornish Bay is coastal embayment, on a chord of 0.89 miles, on a 161° orientation, in the Morvern peninsula in Lochaber, in the western coast of Scotland. There is good anchorage in the bay, with a depth of 7 fathoms. It is well protected, except from winds from the south.

== Settlements ==
Ardtornish Bay is part of Ardtornish Estate. Ardtornish House is famous for its gardens and the estate is the location of the ruined Ardtornish Castle and the still-inhabited Kinlochaline Castle. Lochaline is the largest settlement in the area, and the main village in the Morvern area, along the A884 road. Fort William is the nearest transport hub.

== Geography ==
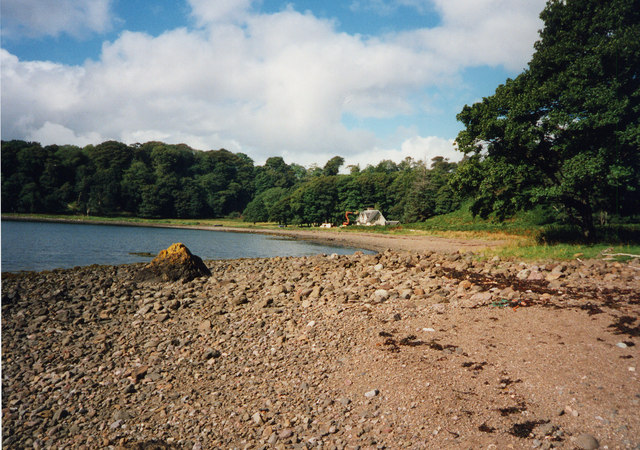
Inninbeg House, Ardtornish Bay

Ardtornish Bay faces the Sound of Mull in a southerly direction, the Sound that runs from Aulston Point and Tobermory in the North to the Rubha Fiart and Duart Point on the Isle of Mull, in the southeast. The small islands of Eilean Rubha an Ridere, that is opposite Inninmore Bay, and Eileanan Glas in the middle of the Sound and Sgeir nan Gobhar off the coast of Mull, can be seen from the bay.

At the west end of the bay, is Artornish Point, is a small promontory, that is rendered remarkable by the ruins of an ancient castle, celebrated by Sir Walter Scott in one of his poems. The ruins are now inconsiderable, consisting principally of the keep, with traces of outer defences, but of its ancient strength and splendour, no remains can be traced, in the crumbling walls of a small and apparently insignificant building. Within the castle a quarter of a mile, on somewhat higher ground, is Ardtornish house with stables and offices.

To the east of the bay, running in the southeast direction is Aoineadh Beag, the dramatic cliffs of Ardtornish Bay. The cliffs rise to be 300metres before a gentle incline up to the hilltop of Glais Bheinn at 479metres. To the north is the narrow opening of Coalas na h-Àirde into Loch Aline.

An Sleaghach at 515m, is the largest peak in the area, in the west about 4.5 miles to the west, but is not visible from the bay, due to the height of the Aoineadh Beag cliffs.
