= Loch Teàrnait =

Loch in the Scottish Highlands

- Loch Tearnait, Loch Ternate
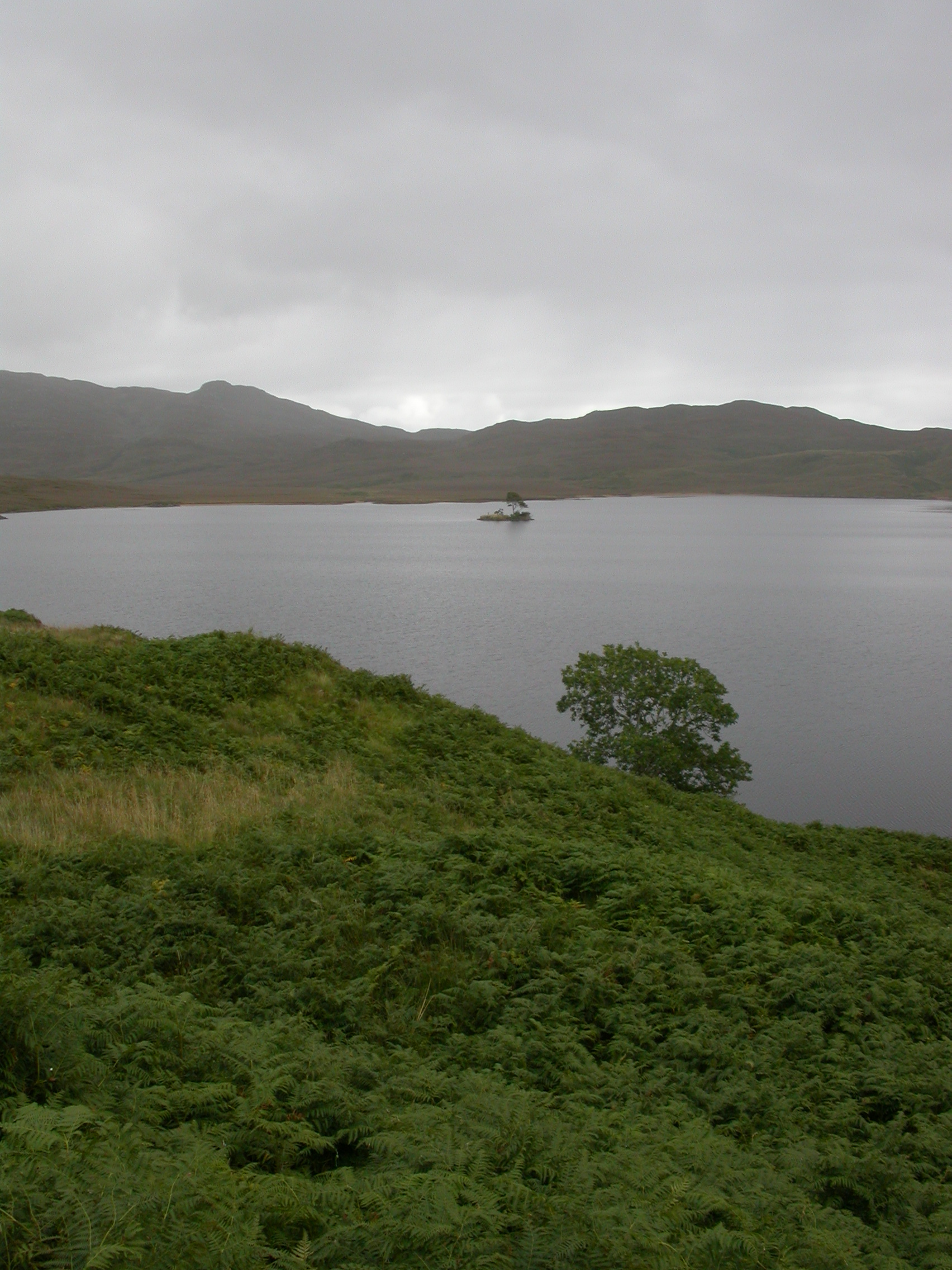

- Location within Highland
- Location: Morvern, Lochaber, Scotland
- Coordinates: 56.5606°N 5.6669°W
- Type: freshwater
- Primary inflows: Allt an Doire Dhairaich
- Primary outflows: River Rannoch
- Basin countries: Scotland
- Max. length: 1.21 km (0.75 mi)
- Max. width: 0.53 km (0.33 mi)
- Surface area: 40.7 ha (101 acres)
- Average depth: 4.9 m (16 ft)
- Max. depth: 12 m (39 ft)
- Water volume: 2,100,000 m^{3} (74,000,000 ft^{3})
- Shore length^{1}: 2.9 km (1.8 mi)
- Surface elevation: 141 m (463 ft)
- Islands: 1 (possibly artificial)
- ^{1} Shore length is not a well-defined measure.

Loch Teàrnait, also known as Loch Tearnait or Loch Ternate, is a small, lowland, freshwater loch on the Ardtornish Estate on the Morvern peninsula in the Scottish Highlands. It lies in an east to west direction and is approximately 6.4 km (4.0 mi) southeast of Loch Arienas and 4.8 km (3.0 mi) east of Loch Aline. It is 1.21 km (0.75 mi) long and 0.53 km (0.33 mi) wide, and is at an altitude of 141 m (463 ft). The average depth is 4.9 m (16 ft) and its maximum depth is 12 m (39 ft). The loch was surveyed on 18 August 1904 by James Murray as part of Sir John Murray's Bathymetrical Survey of Fresh-Water Lochs of Scotland 1897-1909.

In the centre of the loch is a small, circular island which is thought to be the remains of a crannog. It is 18 m (59 ft) in diameter, built of timber and stone, and has two small inlets for boats. It is likely to have been occupied since the Middle Ages, and in local tradition it was said to have been used as a sanctuary for fugitives under the protection of the Lords of the Isles.

In 2009 the company Hydroplan began construction of a hydroelectricity generating facility at the outflow of the loch. Power generation began in December 2012, and the scheme was officially opened in May 2013. In 2008, prior to construction of the hydro scheme, an archaeological survey was undertaken in and around the loch which documented 31 archaeological sites.

The loch holds native wild brown trout and permits are required to fish the loch.
