= Clan MacInnes =

Scottish clan

- Crest: Crest badge of William John MacInnes of Malagawatch a branch of the clan; given to him on 25 January 1961. Incorrectly and commercially accepted as the crest badge for the entire Clan MacInnes
- Motto: Ghift dhe agus an righ (By the Grace of God and the King)

Profile
- Region: Highlands
- District: Argyll
- Plant badge: Cuileann (Ilex aquifolium) Holly
- Clan MacInnes no longer has a chief, and is an armigerous clan
- Historic seat: Kinlochaline Castle
- Died: 1358
Septs of Clan MacInnes
Angus, Canch, Cansh, Caunce, Hance, MacAngus, MacAinish, MacAinsh, MacAneiss, MacAninch, MacAninsh, MacAnish, MacAnsh, MacAonghais, MacAonghuis, MacCainsh, MacCance, MacCanchie, MacCanish, MacCans, MacCansh, MacEnys, MacGinnes, MacGinnis, MacGuenis, Machans, MacHinch, MacInch, MacInish, MacInnes, MacInnis, MacInnisch, MacInnish, MacKance, MacKants, MacKinnes, MacKinness, MacKinnis, MacKinnish, MacKynes, MacQuinnes, Magennis, McAinish, McAneiss, McAngus, McAninch, McAnish, McAnsh, McCainsh, McCance, McCanchie, McCanish, McCans, McCants, McCansh, McEnys, McGinnes, McGinnis, McGuenis, McHinch, McInish, McInnes, McInnisch, McInnish, McInnis, McInsh, McKants, McKance, McKinnes, McKinness, McKinnis, McKinniss, McKinnish, McKynes, Kinnes, Kinnis, Kynnes
Clan branches
MacInnes of Kinlochaline
MacInnes of Malagawatch
MacInnes of Morven
MacInnes of Rickersby
Allied clans
Clan MacGillivray
Clan MacDonald
Clan Mackinnon
Rival clans
Clan MacLean

Clan MacInnes is a Scottish clan originally from the western highlands of Scotland.

== Origin ==
The origin of the name "MacInnes" is an anglicized form of Gaelic Mac Aonghuis, a patronymic from the personal name Aonghus, one of the most ancient names among the Gael. In the genitive the "g" of this word is pronounced, and the name is left with the sound MacAon'es or Maclnnes. Who this Angus was, is unknown. The name Maclnnes could also mean "the Son of the Islet."

== Ancient Alliance ==
Before the defeat of the Lord of the Isles and the dispersion of the clans by King Alexander II, a single confederacy, the Siol Gillivray, appears to have included the MacGillivrays, Maclnneses, MacEacherns, and MacMasters.

Clan Maclnnes had its headquarters in the heart of Morven, and at the head of Loch Aline, which winds away into the hills from the Sound of Mull, the ruin of an old square tower is still pointed out as the ancient seat of the chiefs.

Kinlochaline was within a short distance of Ardtornish, on the Sound of Mull itself, one of the main seats of the Lords of the Isles, and the Maclnneses were probably, therefore, closely allied with and subject to these rulers.

== Destruction of the chiefly line ==
Around 1358 the chief of the clan and his sons were killed at the castle at Ardtornish by members of Clan Maclean on the orders of the Lord of the Isles for apparently meddling in his marriage. Most of the MacInnes lands were subsequently ceded to Clan Maclean by 1390. The current chieftain of the Campbells of Craignish claim to be the succeeded chief of Clan MacInnes.

The Maclnnes chiefs are buried near Kilcolumkil, a short distance away.

== Legendary bowmen ==
Some of the clan survivors moved to Sleat on the Isle of Skye merging with Clan MacKinnon and became known as Sliochd Neill a' bhogha (The Line of Neil of the Bow). One of these families held the office of hereditary bowman to the Chiefs of Clan MacKinnon.

== Wars of Montrose ==
In 1645, during the Wars of Montrose, Kinlochaline was besieged by Irish auxiliaries. Clan Maclnnes held out until a breach was made in the wall and defence became hopeless.

== Clan symbols ==
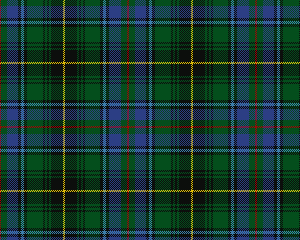
Clan MacInnes Hunting Tartan

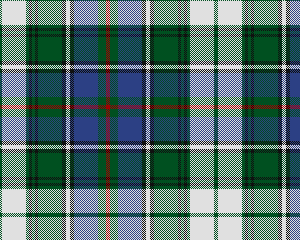
Clan MacInnes Dress Tartan

The clans original crest was a bee alight upon a thistle and the motto "E labore Dulcedo" (in labor, pleasure) presumably related to an episode when a sleeping clan Chief was awakened in time by a bee sting resulting in the clan defeating a party of Vikings. This symbol is no longer in use.

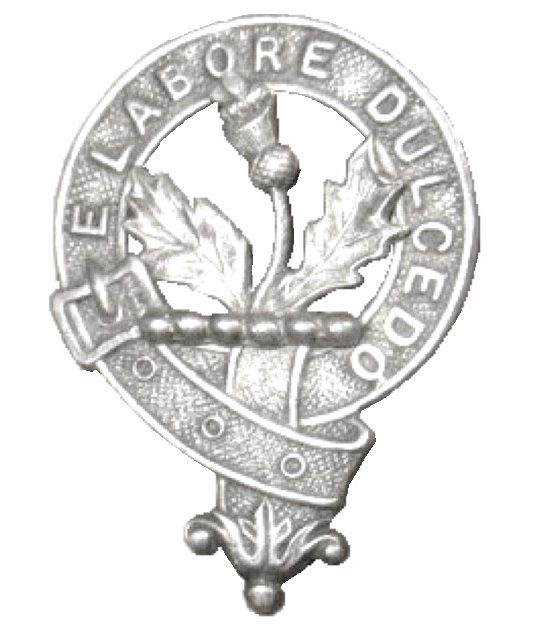
Clan MacInnes Original crest badge

== Clan Association ==
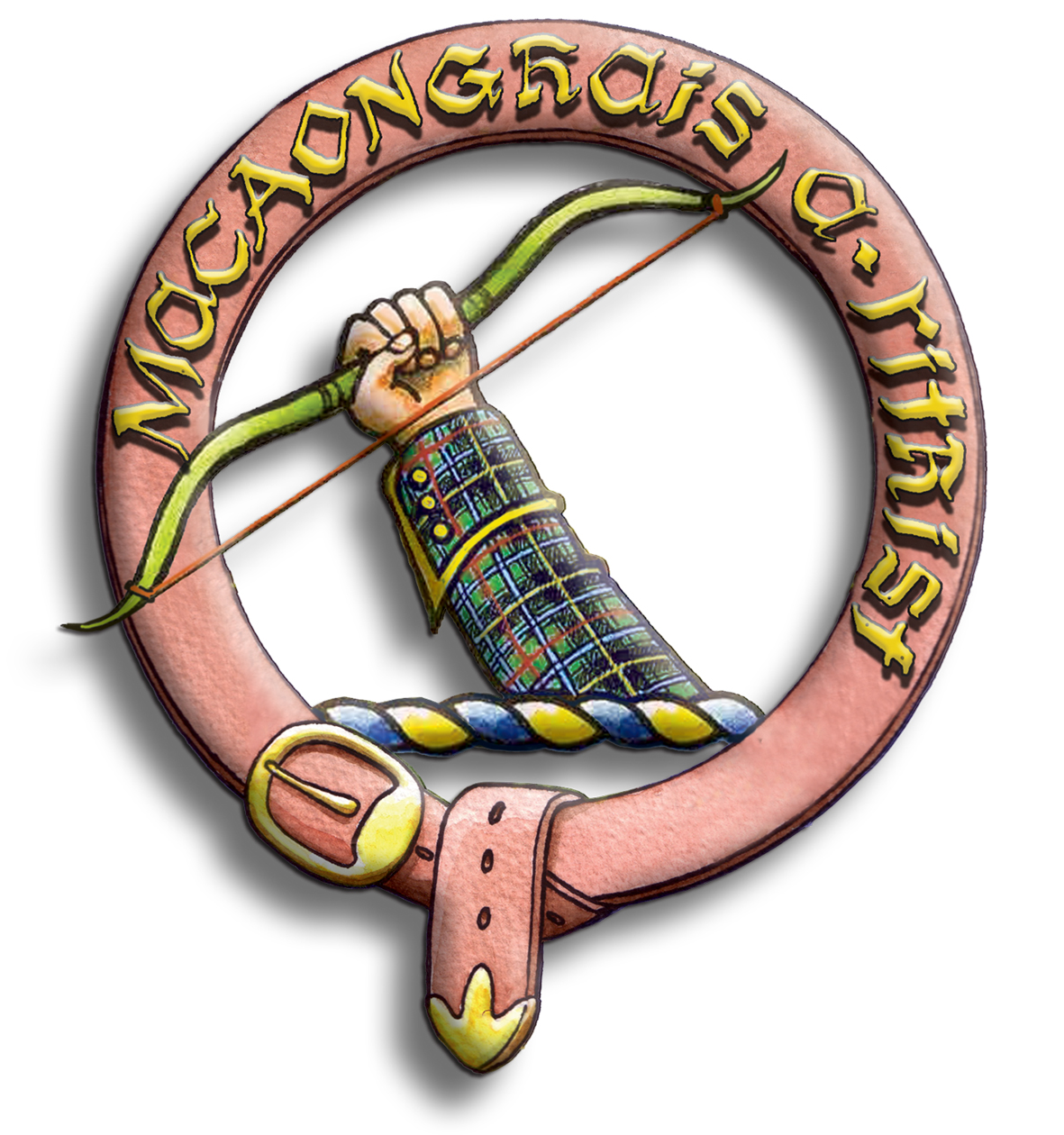
Shield of the International Association of Clan MacInnes approved by Lord Lyon

The International Association of Clan MacInnes came into existence in 1970.

On 26 November 2018, the Court of the Lord Lyon advised the International Association of Clan MacInnes that they were at liberty to choose between a plain circlet and the belt and buckle for the IACM Crest.
