= Bonnavoulin =

Coordinates: 56.609°N 05.976°W

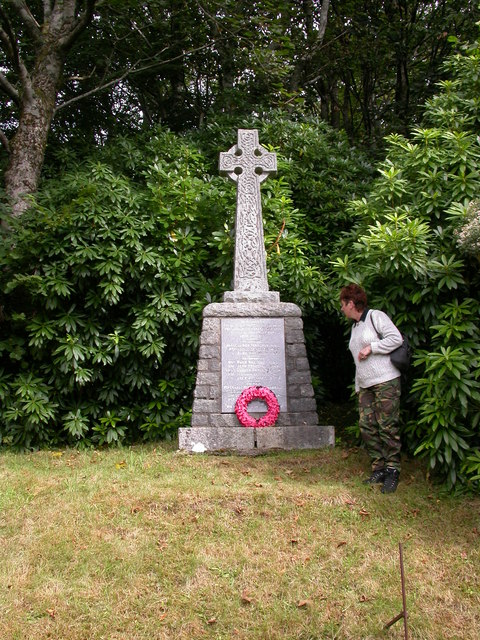
- Celtic Cross between Drimnin and Bonnavoulin.

- Location within the Lochaber area
- OS grid reference: NM561535
- Council area: Highland
- Country: Scotland
- Sovereign state: United Kingdom
- Police: Scotland
- Fire: Scottish
- Ambulance: Scottish

Bonnavoulin or Bunavullin (Scottish Gaelic: Bun a Mhuilinn) is a village on the Morvern peninsula in the Highlands of Scotland. Situated at the northern terminus of the B849, it is about 10 miles (16 kilometres) from Lochaline and on the eastern shore of the Sound of Mull opposite the isle of Mull and is in the Highland Council area.
