= Lochaline Mine =

Sand mine in Scotland

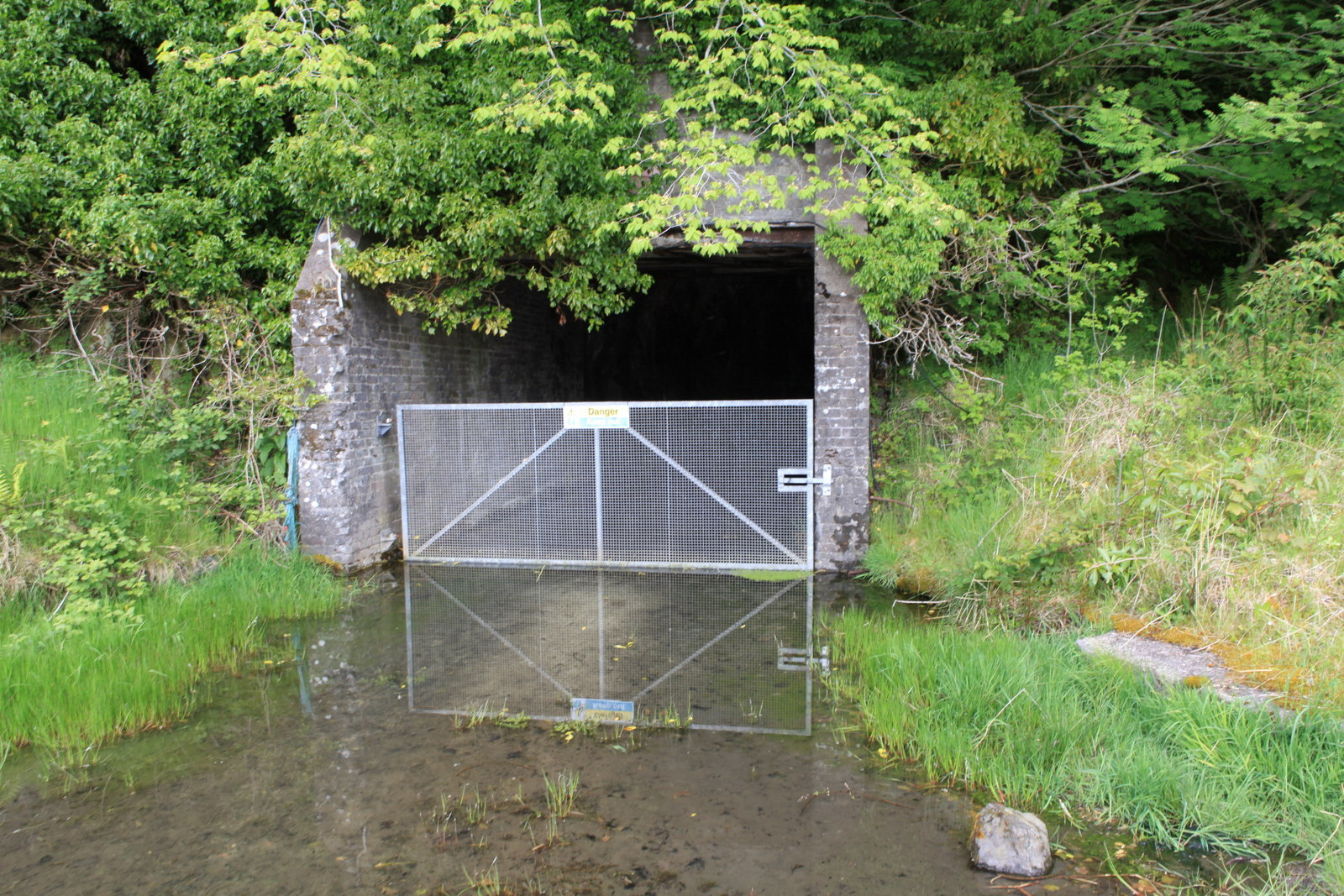
- Lochaline Mine entrance

- Location within Lochaber
- Location: Lochaline, Morvern, Highland, Scotland; 56.541°N 5.774°W
- Products: Silica sand
- Production: 140,000 tonnes (150,000 tons)
- Financial year: 2021
- Opened: 1940
- Active: 1940–2008; 2012–present
- Closed: still open 2024
- Acquired: 2012

Lochaline Mine is a mine on the Morvern peninsula of the Highland area of Scotland. The mine works a white cretaceous sandstone to produce high grade silica sand (the purest grade in the United Kingdom) for glass and industrial use. It is one of only two underground mines in Scotland, and is the only underground sand mine in Europe. (Note: Scotland had a long history of coal mining, but the last deep mine, Longannet Colliery, closed in 2002. The only other active mine in Scotland is at Cononish, near Tyndrum, which works a gold seam.) The mine was founded in 1940 due to a limited supply of high grade silica during the Second World War, and was briefly closed for four years between 2008 and 2012. Production ranges from 100,000 tonnes (110,000 tons) to 140,000 tonnes (150,000 tons) per year.

== History ==
Lochaline was first recognised as a potential sand resource in 1895, but at that time, cheap imports of glass sand were delivered to the United Kingdom from Europe, so the site was deemed not economically viable. The mine is located near to the village of Lochaline on the Morvern peninsula, some 40 miles (64 km) south-west of Fort William. The site was found to have a seam of white cretaceous sandstone some 18 feet (5.5 m) thick extending north-westwards from Lochaline. The sand was deposited 135 million years ago and was saved from erosion by eruptions from the nearby Mull Volcano, which covered the sand in basalt. Due to the presence of the basalt (about 490 feet (150 m) thick) above the sand deposits, it is worked as a mine rather than the normal method of quarrying. The method of working the deposit is to mine underneath the hard rock leaving a maximum of 6-foot-7-inch (2 m) sand as a room and pillar method to support the workings. The upper 6-foot-7-inch (2 m) has a greater rate of impurity and the middle section, extending from 16–26 feet (5–8 m), is what is mined extensively as this has virtually no impurities.

The mine was started in 1940 due to the scarcity of silica sand supply caused by the outbreak of the Second World War. Previously high quality silica was sourced from a site at Fontainebleau outside Paris, but the occupation of France ceased this supply. During the war, the sand was needed for the glass contained within bomb aiming sights and submarine periscopes. Originally horses were used to transport the sand from the mine to the surface works and pier into the adjacent sea loch (Loch Aline). The horses were replaced quite soon afterwards by a railway (with rails from a captured German cargo ship) which operated between 1943 and 1963, when diesel lorries took over the operation. The mine has a dedicated pier and ship operation in the loch and exports its sand to ports in England (to destinations in Runcorn and Scunthorpe) and also to Europe. At Runcorn, the sand is used to make solar panels.

It was closed by Tarmac in 2008, but revived in 2012 in a joint enterprise between Pilkington's and Gruppo Minerali Maffei, an Italian mining company, as Lochaline Quartz Sand. At its re-opening, the mine covered 378 acres (153 ha) accessed by 30 miles (48 km) of tunnels, and was estimated to have a working life of a decade and produce an average of 100,000 tonnes (110,000 tons) of sand per year. By 2021, it was producing 140,000 tonnes (150,000 tons) of sand per year and was expected to remain open for decades. The tunnels had expanded to a length of over 200 miles (320 km) and the main working face was 590 feet (180 m) below the surface. The site is the only underground sand mine in Europe.

The mine produces a very high grade of silica with very low iron impurity; it was rated as being 0.0085 % ferric oxide (Fe_{2}O_{3}). In June 2022, it was announced that a new trail for public information would be opened, including the history of the narrow-gauge railway that served the mine.

In 2024 a mineworker was fatally injured by an unguarded fan. Lochaline Quartz Sand Ltd pled guilty to a breach of the Health and Safety at Work Act, and were fined £150,000.

== Owners ==
- Charles Tennant & Co, 1940–1972
- Tilcon 1972–2001
- Tarmac 2001–2008
- Lochaline Quartz Sand, 2012–present
