= Norman Macleod (moderator) =

Scottish minister

Norman Macleod FRSE (1838–1911) was a Scottish minister who served as Moderator of the General Assembly of the Church of Scotland in 1900.

== Life ==
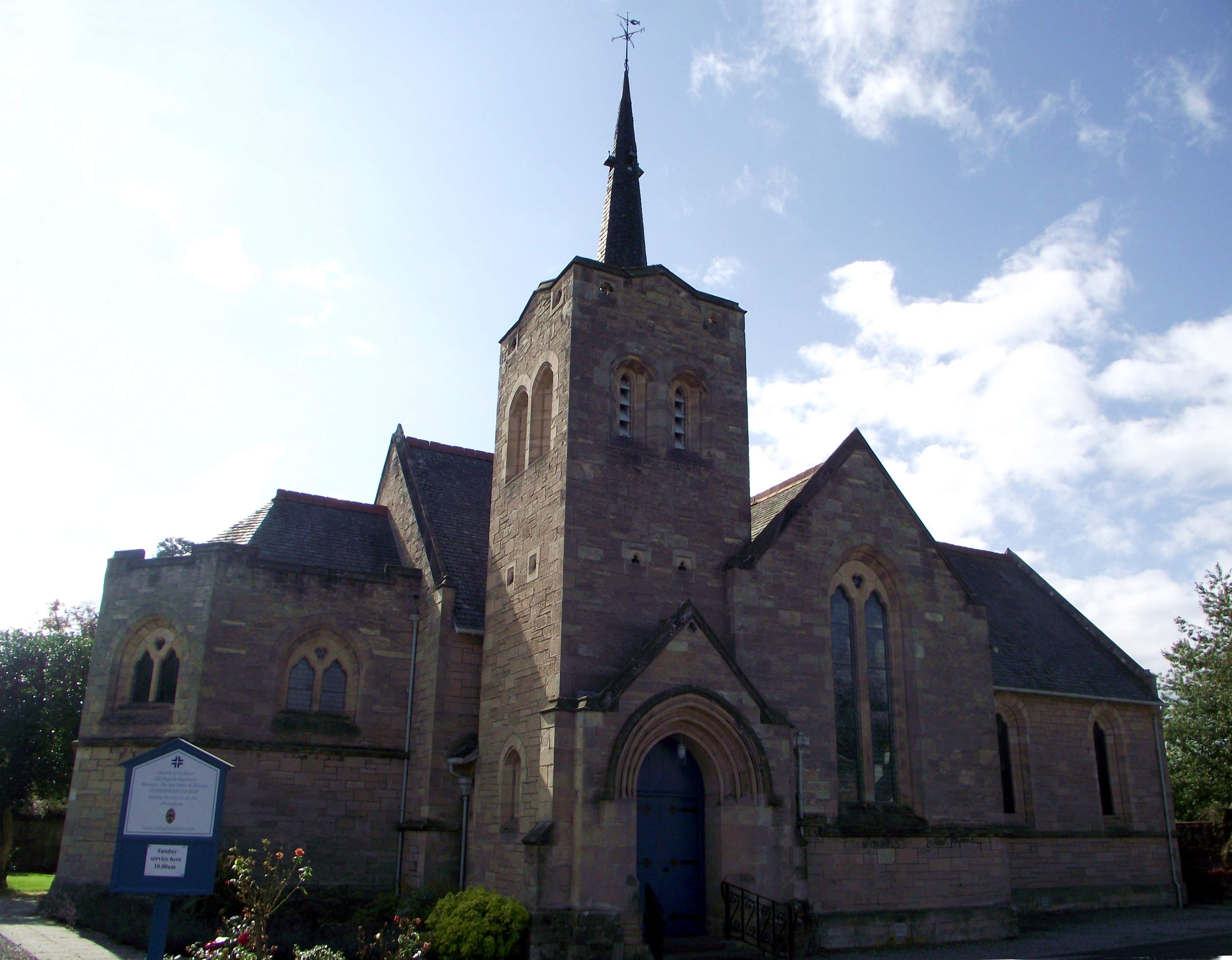
St Stephen's Church, Inverness

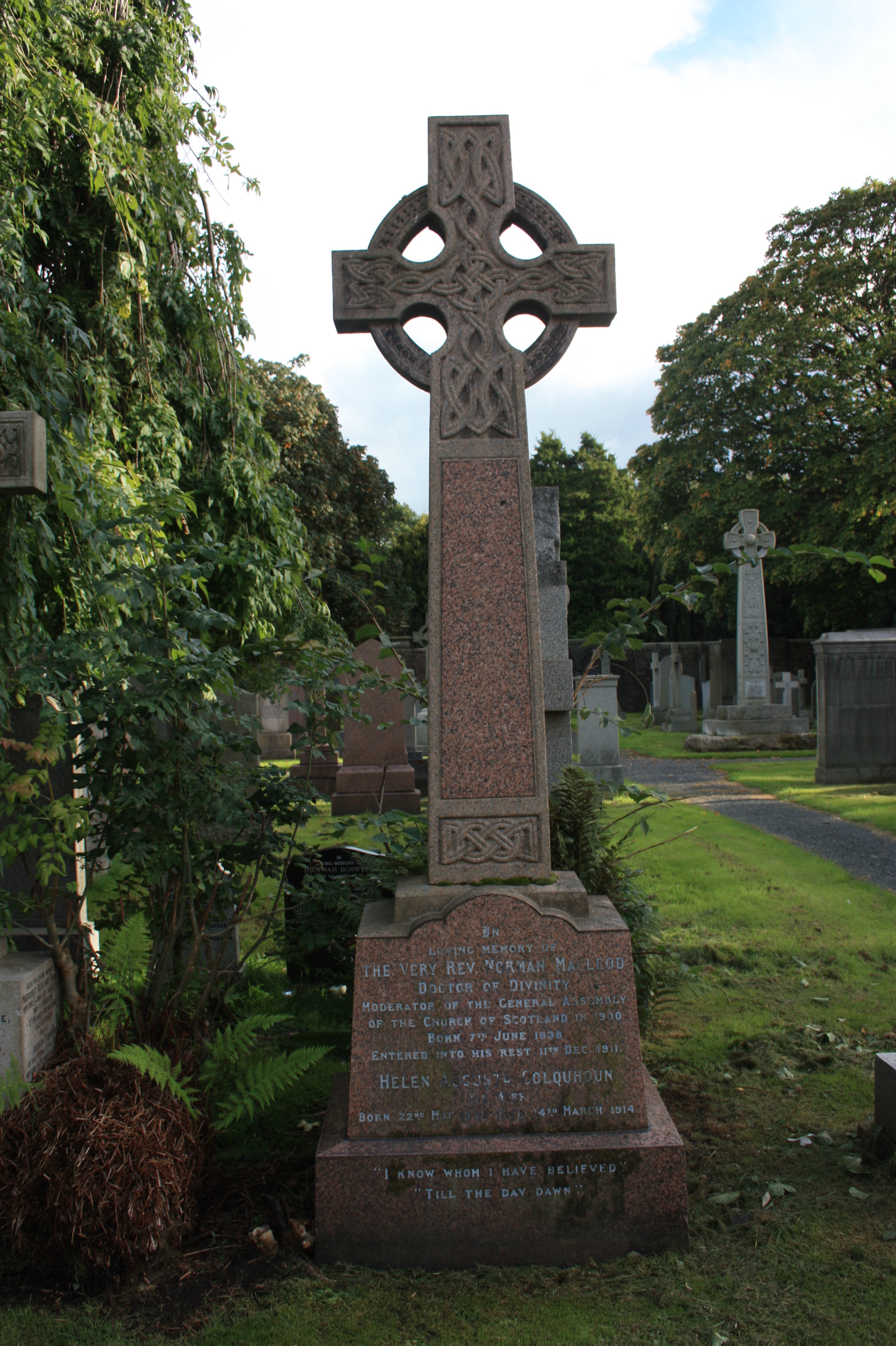
The grave of Very Rev Norman Macleod, Dean Cemetery, Edinburgh

He was born on 7 June 1838, the son of Rev John Macleod of Morvern, and his wife Margaret MacLean. His brother, John Macleod, became minister of Govan.

He studied divinity at Glasgow University. In 1875 he translated from Blair Atholl Parish Church to St Stephen's Church in Stockbridge, Edinburgh. In 1885 he was living nearby at 7 Royal Circus. In 1890 translated St Stephens Church in Inverness.

In 1876 he was elected a Fellow of the Royal Society of Edinburgh. His proposers were David Smith, Andrew Douglas Maclagan, David Stevenson and Thomas Stevenson.

He died on 11 December 1911. He is buried with his wife in Dean Cemetery in western Edinburgh. The grave lies on the north path of the original northern extension at the junction with a north–south path.

== Family ==
He was married to Helen Augusta Colquhoun (died 1914).

== Family ==
He was married to Mary Augusta Colquhoun.

== Memorials ==
A memorial stained glass window to his memory was erected in St Stephens Church in 1914.
