= John Sinclair of Lochaline =

Scottish Highland merchant (1770–1863)

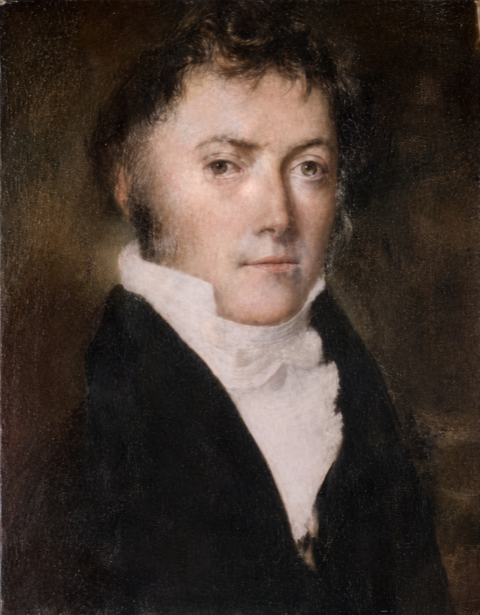
- Miniature traditionally believed to depict John Sinclair of Lochaline
- Born: 1770; Ardchattan, Glen Kinglass, Loch Etive, Scotland
- Died: 1863 (aged 92–93); Lochaline, Morvern, Argyllshire
- Occupations: Merchant, Landowner
- Known for: Founding the Ledaig / Tobermory Distillery; estate improvements in Morvern; development of Lochaline village
- Spouse: Catherine MacLachlan (1786–1825)
- Children: 6 (Margaret Campbell, Catherine, Flora Anne, Mary Elizabeth, John and Robert who died 1 day after birth)

John Sinclair of Lochaline (November 1770 – 11 January 1863) was a Scottish Highland merchant, maritime trader, distillery founder and landowner who lived through a period of major social and economic transition in the Scottish Highlands county of Argyll.

John Sinclair’s lifetime spanned the final decline of the traditional Scottish clan system, which as a landowning structure effectively disappeared between 1746 and about 1880.

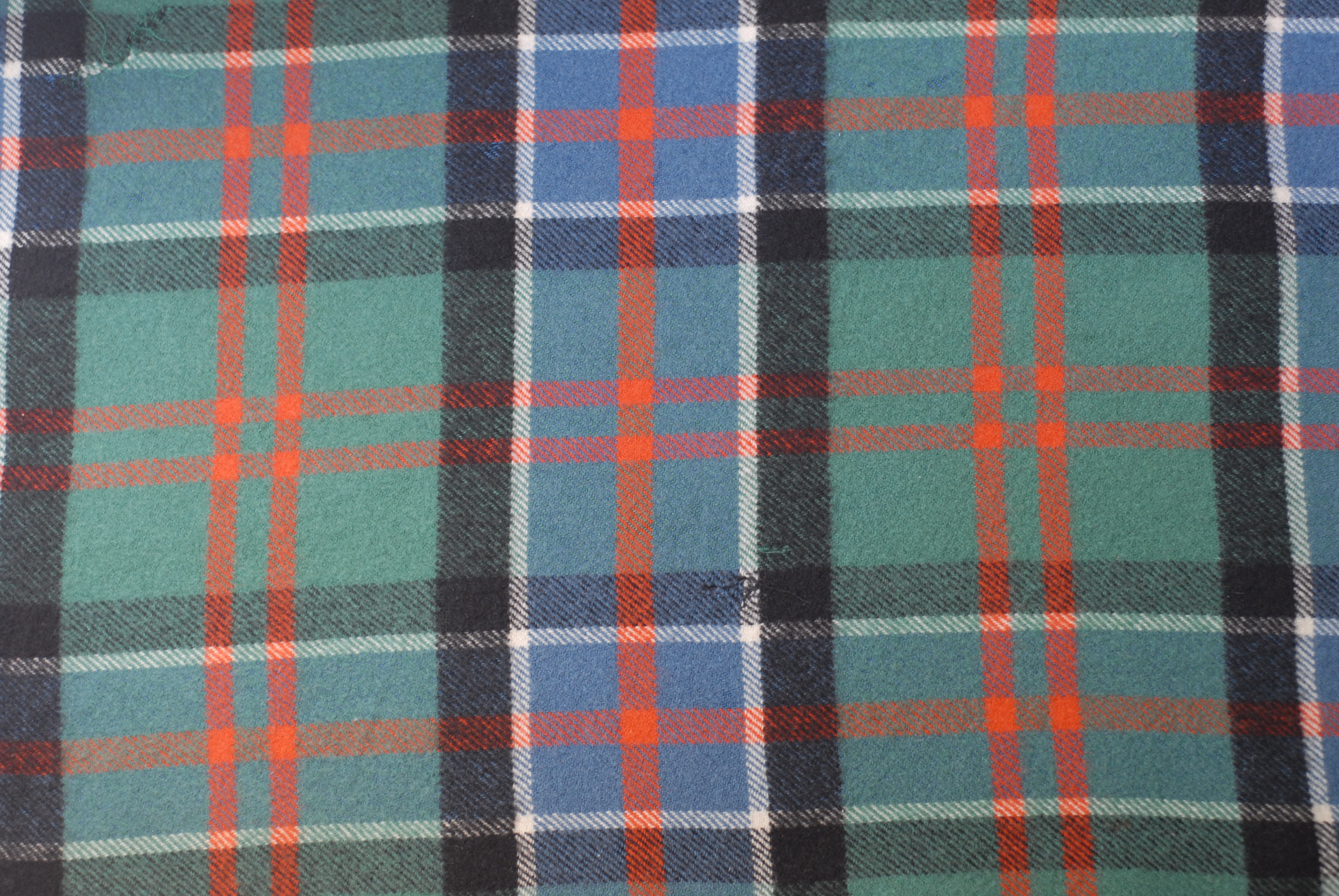
Ancient Hunting Sinclair

He is best known as the founder of the Ledaig Distillery (now Tobermory distillery) on the Isle of Mull in 1798, one of Scotland’s oldest surviving whisky distilleries. Having made his fortune in trade, Sinclair acquired 8,550 acres in Morvern, where he developed the Lochaline Estate and established himself in the style of a Highland laird.

In 1814 he married Catherine MacLachlan of Rahoy, with whom he had six children. Her death in 1825, shortly after the family moved across the Sound of Mull into the newly completed Lochaline House, marked a turning point in his life, from merchant to substantial landowner.

Sinclair became a respected local figure noted for his community leadership, support of the Free Church movement, and contributions to regional economic development. He died in January 1863 at the age of 93 and was buried at Kiel Church, Morvern, leaving a legacy characteristic of a passing era of patriarchal estate management and Highland community life.

== Early life ==
Sinclair was born in 1770 in Ardchattan, in Glen Kinglas on Loch Etive, the son of Duncan Sinclair and Catherine MacIlriach. His family were tacksmen of Doire nan Soar, part of the Ardchattan estate, one of several Sinclair families claiming descent from the St Clairs of Rosslyn.

Parish records of Muckairn indicate that Duncan Sinclair and Catherine MacIlriach had other children baptised there, including Margaret (born 15 November 1782) and Christian (born 1 December 1787). In the 1851 census Margaret Campbell, described as John Sinclair’s sister and born in Muckairn, was residing in his household at Lochaline.

Following the early death of his father, Duncan Sinclair, John assumed family responsibilities while still young.

== Early career and business ventures ==
John Sinclair’s entrepreneurial career began in the newly planned fishing port of Tobermory on the Isle of Mull around the turn of the nineteenth century. In 1798 he founded the Ledaig distillery, one of the earliest whisky operations in Scotland, preceding the Excise Act of 1823 that formalised distilling. The Ledaig Distillery (later renamed Tobermory distillery), remains among Scotland’s oldest working distilleries.

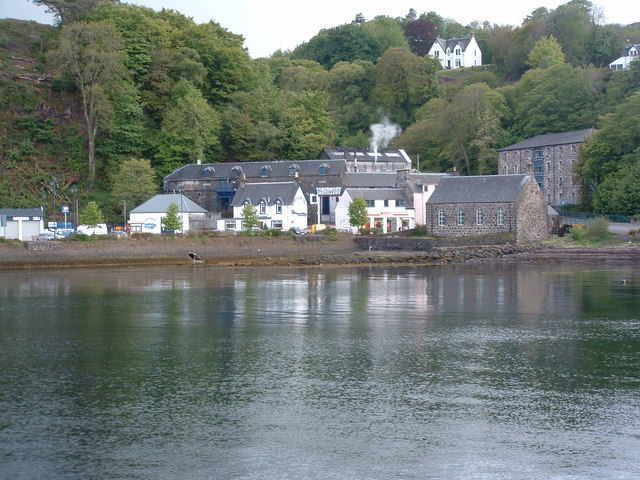
Tobermory distillery viewed from the harbour

At that time, the town was developing rapidly under the British Society for Promoting the Fisheries of Scotland, and Sinclair, then a young merchant, quickly became one of its most active settlers. He traded widely, built premises and established shipping links between Mull, Glasgow, and Liverpool to carry kelp and other goods. Wilson’s description indicates that Sinclair was an opportunistic and risk-taking entrepreneur who honoured his obligations and it used to be said that "Mr. Sinclair's word was as good as his Bond."

He became known for his reliability in trade and even issued his own credit notes, a local form of currency signed and dated in Tobermory. His energy and integrity earned him a leading role among the town’s early settlers.

== The Lochaline estate ==
Between 1813 and 1836 Sinclair purchased and consolidated the Lochaline Estate in Morvern, acquiring lands formerly held by the Morvern Campbells. There he developed new crofting settlements, improved farmland, and built Lochaline House (later known as Fiunary House). Lochaline House is now in ruins, and the Highland Historic Environment Record (HER) provides details and photographs.

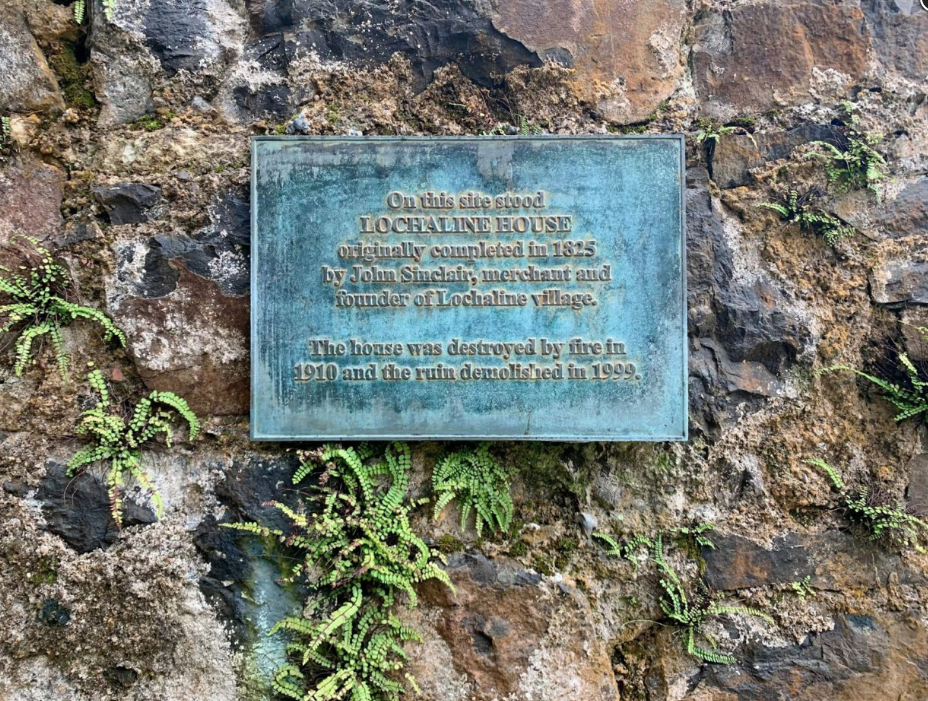
Plaque on the ruins of Lochaline House

The social and economic foundations of Highland life were already shifting in the century before Sinclair’s time. As A. J. Youngson has shown, from as early as 1732 in Mull, Morvern and the neighbouring islands, land began to be leased directly to small tenants rather than through a hereditary tacksman, marking a profound change in land tenure and local authority. Throughout the eighteenth and nineteenth centuries, the traditional role of the tacksman underwent a significant transformation, shaped by agricultural improvement, the Highland Clearances and the gradual decline of Scottish clan loyalty. Amid these upheavals, Sinclair adapted to the new order, continuing to live in the style of a tacksman or local laird, blending traditional responsibilities with emerging patterns of estate management in nineteenth century Morvern. Lochaline House combined traditional Highland estate practices with nineteenth-century improvements.

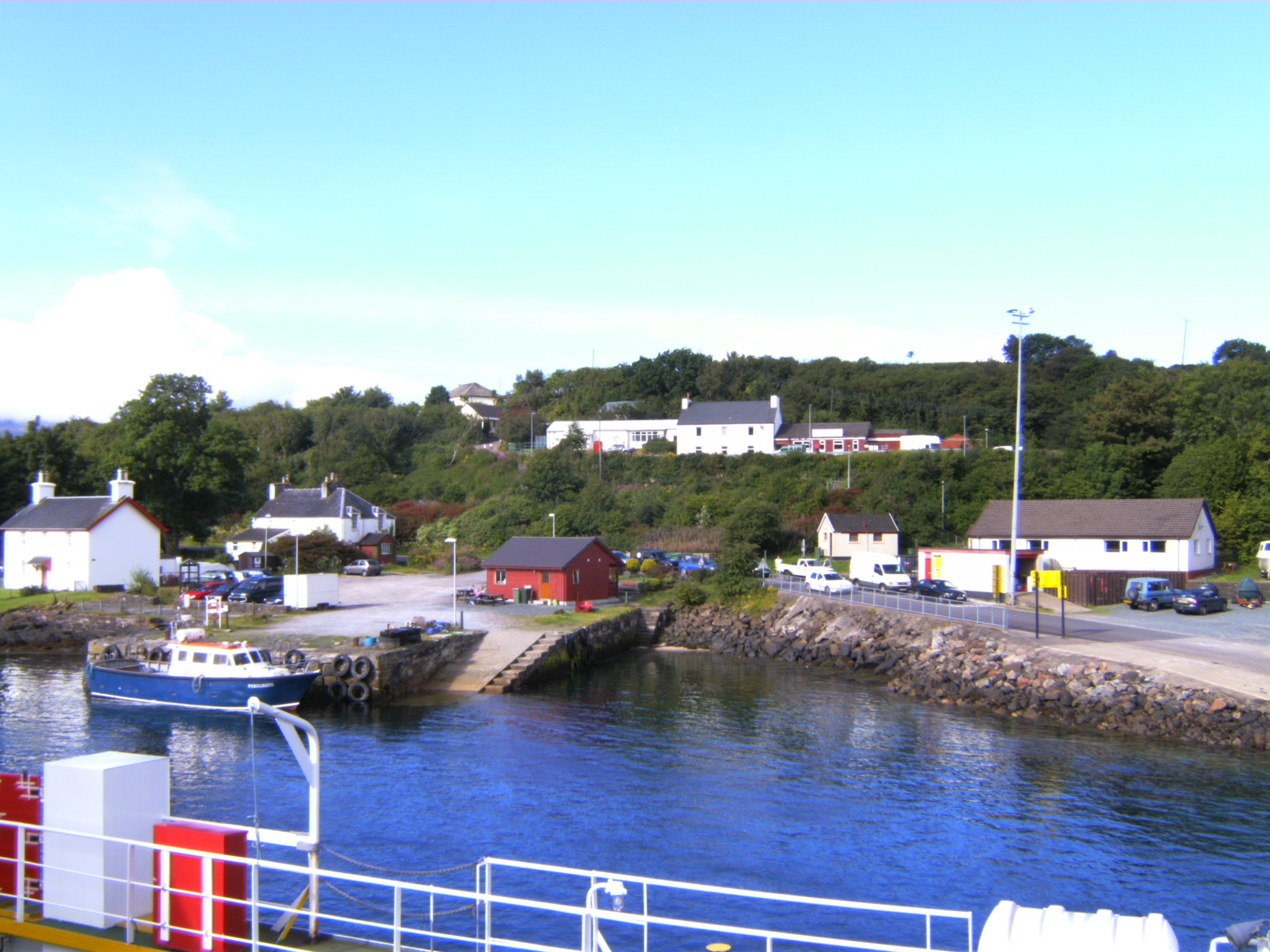
Lochaline

Around 1830 Sinclair laid out the village of Lochaline as a planned settlement to provide employment, improved housing, and small-scale industry for local tenants. Although little of its original layout survives, Lochaline remains the main settlement of Morvern. He introduced new farming techniques, land drainage and woodland planting, and maintained a noted fold of Highland cattle. Sinclair was remembered locally as a progressive laird who valued fairness, education, and the welfare of his tenants, and who encouraged literacy and moral instruction through support for the parish school.

Philip Gaskell described Sinclair as follows: “Sinclair was always more an original than a mere anachronism. It was characteristic of him that he was the only proprietor in the district to ‘come out’ for the Free Church at the Disruption of 1843; and he lived to a vigorous old age, blind but with a full head of white hair, a jolly old man of ninety-three.”

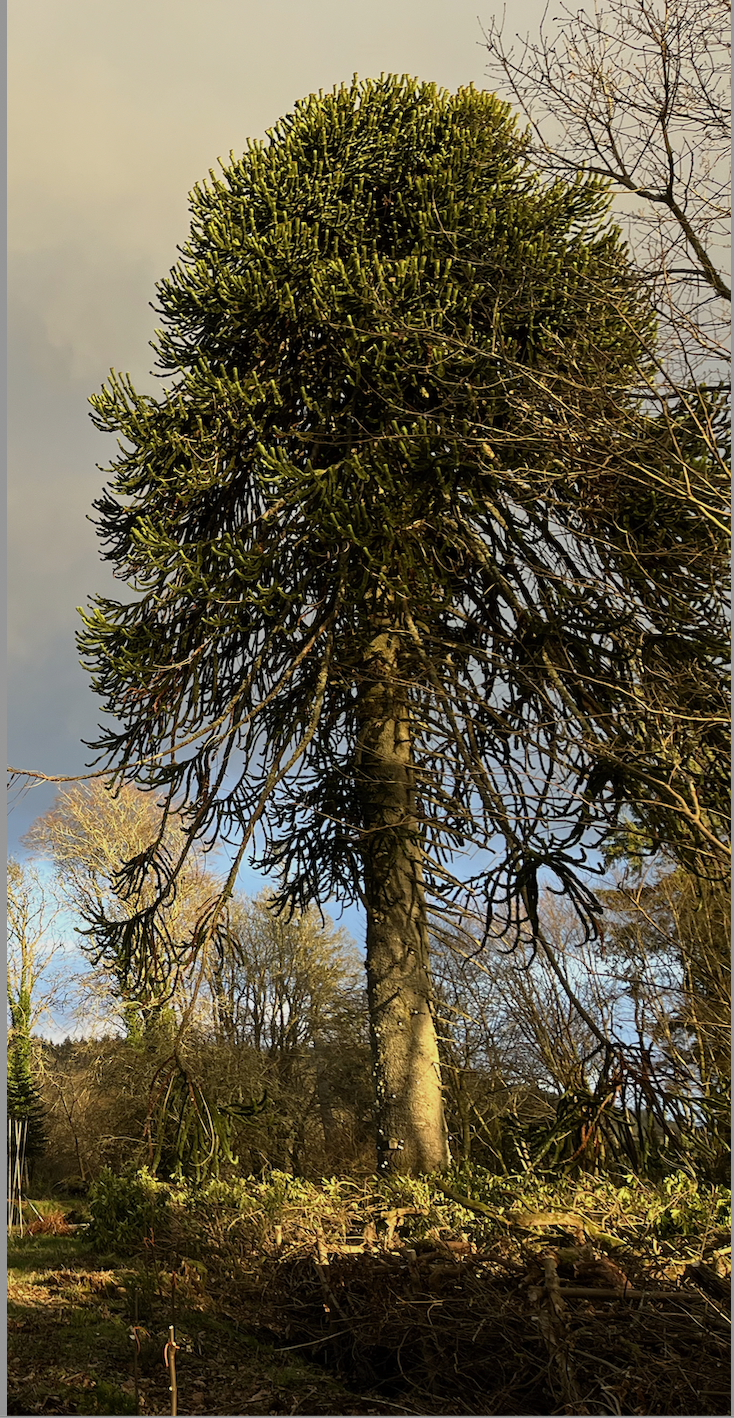
Araucaria araucana (Monkey Puzzle tree) planted by John Sinclair of Lochaline, the surviving one of an original pair in the formal garden.

Gaskell records that Sinclair rose from merchant to landowner, acquiring farms along the Morvern coast and managing them with the same energy and enterprise that had made him successful in trade. He introduced estate improvements, planted woodland, and built new steadings, keeping the home farm in his own hands “as he believed in the landlord setting an example to his tenants.”

Unlike many of his contemporaries during the Highland Clearances, Sinclair followed his own course. Although he removed some smallholders from parts of the estate, particularly Keil and Savary, he retained others at Achabeg and Knock, creating what Gaskell describes as a “mixed estate” unusual for its time. To help resettle displaced families, he founded a village near Knock around 1830 which he named Lochaline after the estate.

While conditions in the new settlement were often cramped and Sinclair’s rents high, Gaskell notes that “he did not actually hound them out of the parish; he was a Highlander, speaking to them in their own language (Scottish Gaelic) and behaving like an old-style Highland laird, which was something they understood and were grateful for.”

== Family life ==
In 1814 John Sinclair married Catherine MacLachlan (1786–1825), eldest daughter of Robert MacLachlan, Tacksman of Rahoy, and his wife Margaret Campbell. Catherine came from a respected Morvern family whose lineage traced back to the MacLachlans of Dunadd, traditionally associated with the early kingdom of Dál Riata. Gaskell “Agnes King's memoirs” pages 223/4 indicates that she was well educated for her time, dividing each year between tuition at home in Rahoy under a governess and study at Aros in Mull, where she shared lessons with her close friend Agnes Maxwell, daughter of James Maxwell, the Duke of Argyll’s chamberlain. Agnes later married the Rev. Norman MacLeod, whose son, also Norman MacLeod, became the celebrated author of Morvern: A Highland Parish

Catherine’s marriage to Sinclair coincided with his most successful years as a merchant and distiller, during which he expanded his commercial interests, acquired land in Morvern, and began the construction of Lochaline House. Her education, refinement and social connections complemented his growing status, and together they represented a union of enterprise and Highland tradition. Tragically, Catherine died in childbirth in 1825 and her baby Robert died one day later, just as the new house was completed and her husband was entering fully into the role of a landed laird.

The couple had five children who survived to adulthood: four daughters – Margaret Campbell (b. 1817), Catherine (b. 1818), Flora Anne (b. 1820), and Mary Elizabeth (b. c.1823), and one son, John (b. c.1822).

Through his daughter Catherine, Sinclair was the grandfather of the notable physician and laryngologist Sir St Clair Thomson.

== Religious commitment and community life ==
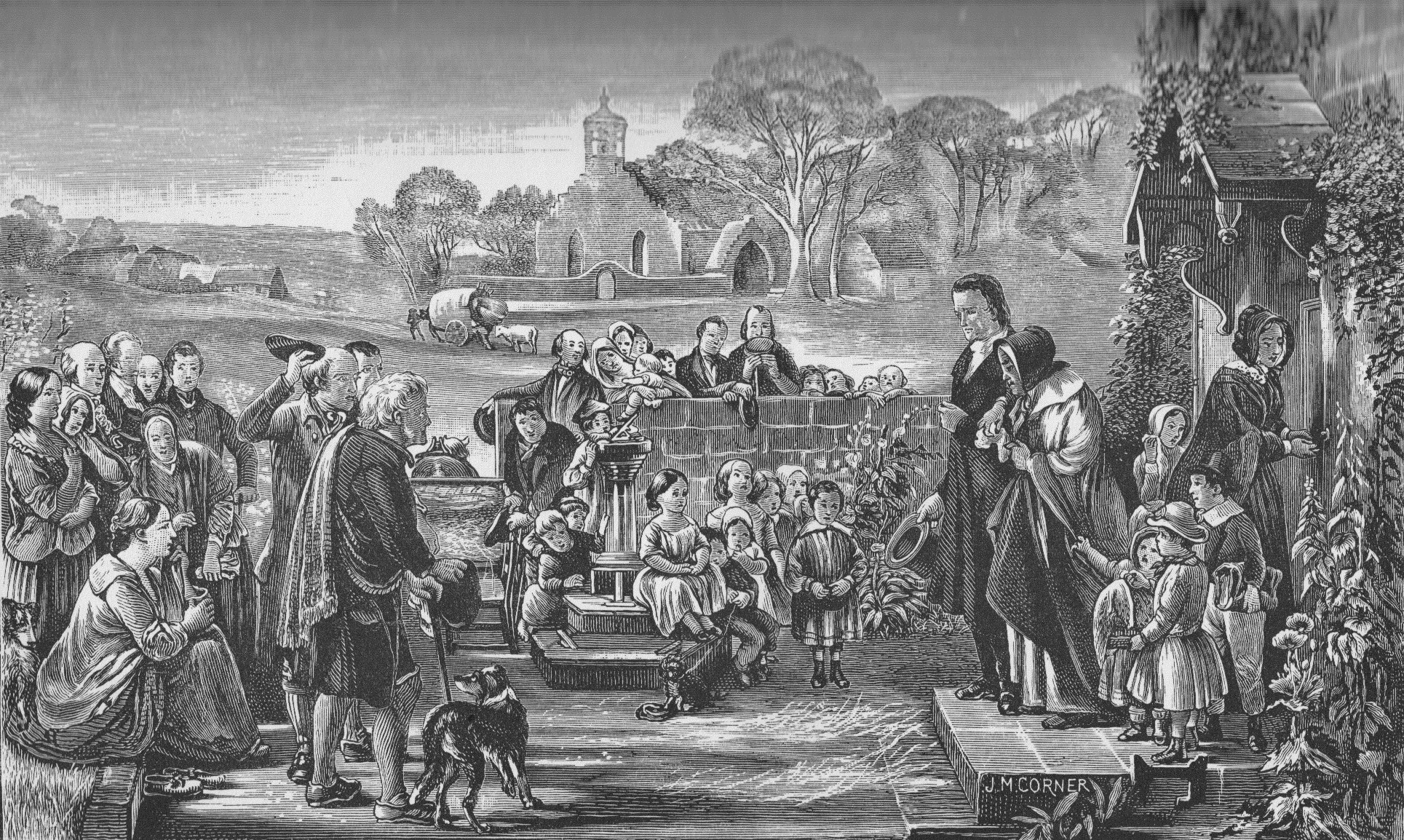
Leaving The Manse

Sinclair’s reputation extended beyond commerce and estate affairs. A respected Deputy Lieutenant for Argyllshire, he became a prominent supporter of the Free Church of Scotland during the Disruption of 1843. He was the only proprietor in Morvern to leave the established church, leading eleven families to form a Free Church congregation and, in 1852, overseeing the building of a new Free Church at Lochaline. In his will, he made provision to exempt the church from any feu duties owed to his estate.

He also served as Postmaster of Tobermory, a position recorded in Pigot & Co.’s 1851 Scottish Directory and reflecting his standing as a trusted local official within the community.

At Lochaline House, Sinclair’s family maintained an open and sociable household. His daughter Margaret (later Mrs James King) recalled that visitors were constant and that the estate’s produce was abundant. Gaskell, in “Agnes King's memoirs” page 226 states "So abundant was the supply of salmon there at that time that servants when engaged, stipulated not to have it served more than so many days a week". The 1861 census recorded twenty-six residents at Lochaline House, including family members, guests and staff.

== Later life and death ==
In later life Sinclair remained active in local affairs and was known for his benevolence and moderation. His will reflected his sense of fairness: rejecting the English system of primogeniture, he ensured a more equal division of inheritance among his children, in the Scottish tradition of partible inheritance.

Agnes King in her memoirs records that “While my parents were living in Liverpool Grandfather came to them and underwent an operation on his eye for cataract. The operation was a success, and he saw for five years after. When my youngest Aunt, Mary, married [c. 1856], Grandfather had become quite blind again by that time, so Father and Mother went to live with him with their family at Lochaline. Mother once more managed the house and Father acted as land-steward or factor. For eight happy years we lived there.”

The 1861 census records Sinclair, then aged 91 and a widower, as head of a household at Lochaline House comprising 26 people, including his daughter Margaret King, her husband James King, several grandchildren, a governess, and numerous domestic and agricultural servants.

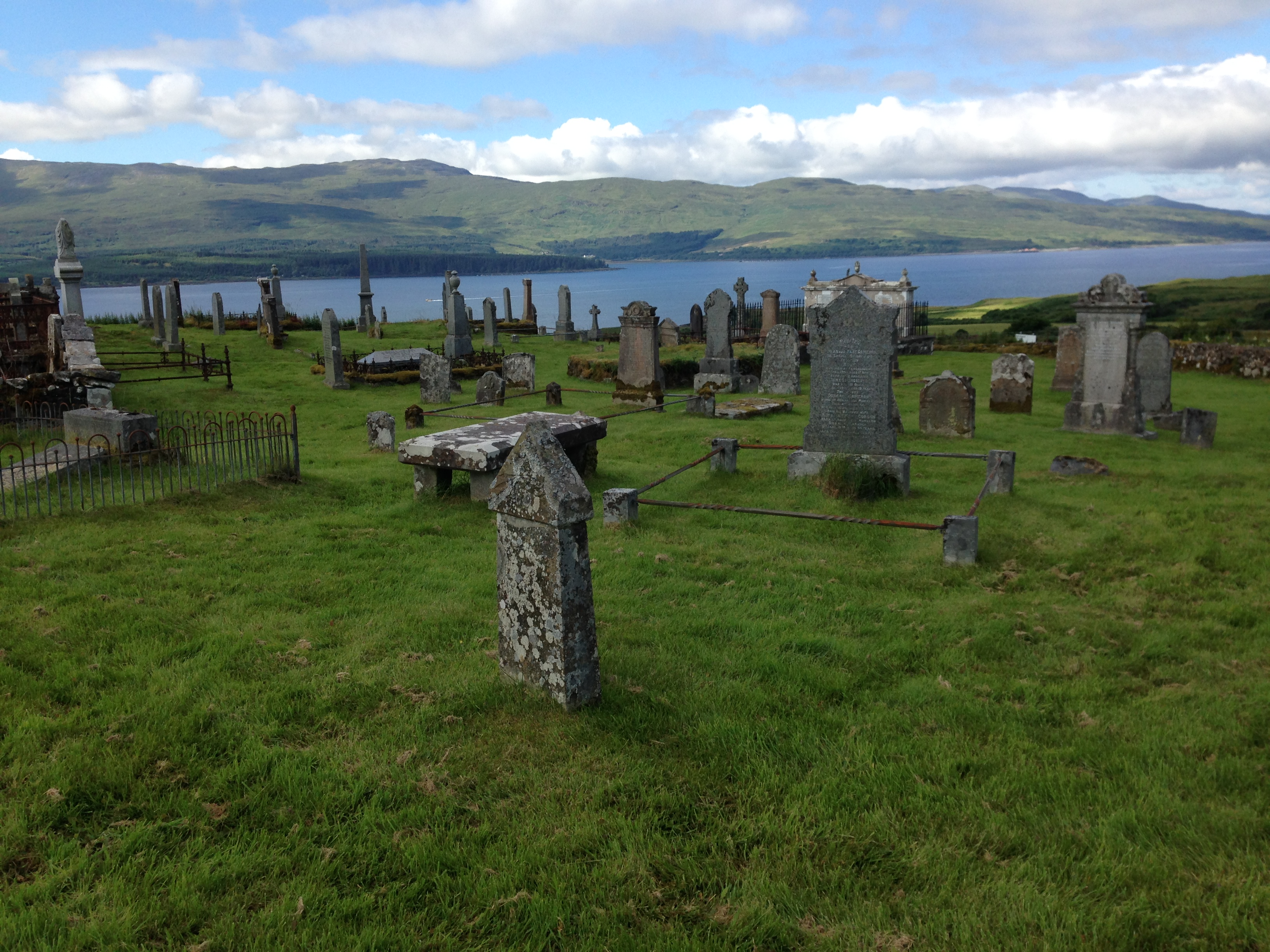
Kiel Church Lochaline 2014

John Sinclair died at Lochaline House, Morvern, on 11 January 1863, aged 93., and was buried in the churchyard beside Kiel Church, Morvern. A white marble memorial on the side of the McLachlan chapel commemorates both him and his wife Catherine.

After his death, his trustees placed the estate for sale in accordance with his instructions.

== Legacy ==
John Sinclair’s life journey from enterprising merchant to landowning laird (as described in his granddaughter Agnes King’s memoirs) illustrates the experience of a nineteenth-century Highlander adapting to the social and economic changes of his time. His paternalistic involvement in the Morvern community contrasted sharply with that of many absentee landlords. Combining enterprise, moral conviction, and community loyalty, Sinclair was among the few native proprietors to remain resident in Morvern during a period of upheaval. Fluent in Scottish Gaelic and known for his approachability, he balanced traditional authority with compassion and good sense. The planned village of Lochaline and the continuing operation of the Tobermory Distillery remain associated with his legacy.

=== Factors contributing to John Sinclair’s business success ===
John Sinclair rose from modest beginnings to substantial wealth through strategic partnerships, diversification, and careful use of local advantage. His early partnership with the Duke of Argyll, which included a one-fifth share in a 60-ton sloop, secured near-exclusive access to kelp and barley export routes in the Hebrides. He founded the Ledaig (later Tobermory) distillery in 1798, moving from raw products into higher-value production.

He invested in his own pier and built up a small fleet, reducing port fees and enabling direct freight links between the Hebrides, Glasgow, and Liverpool.

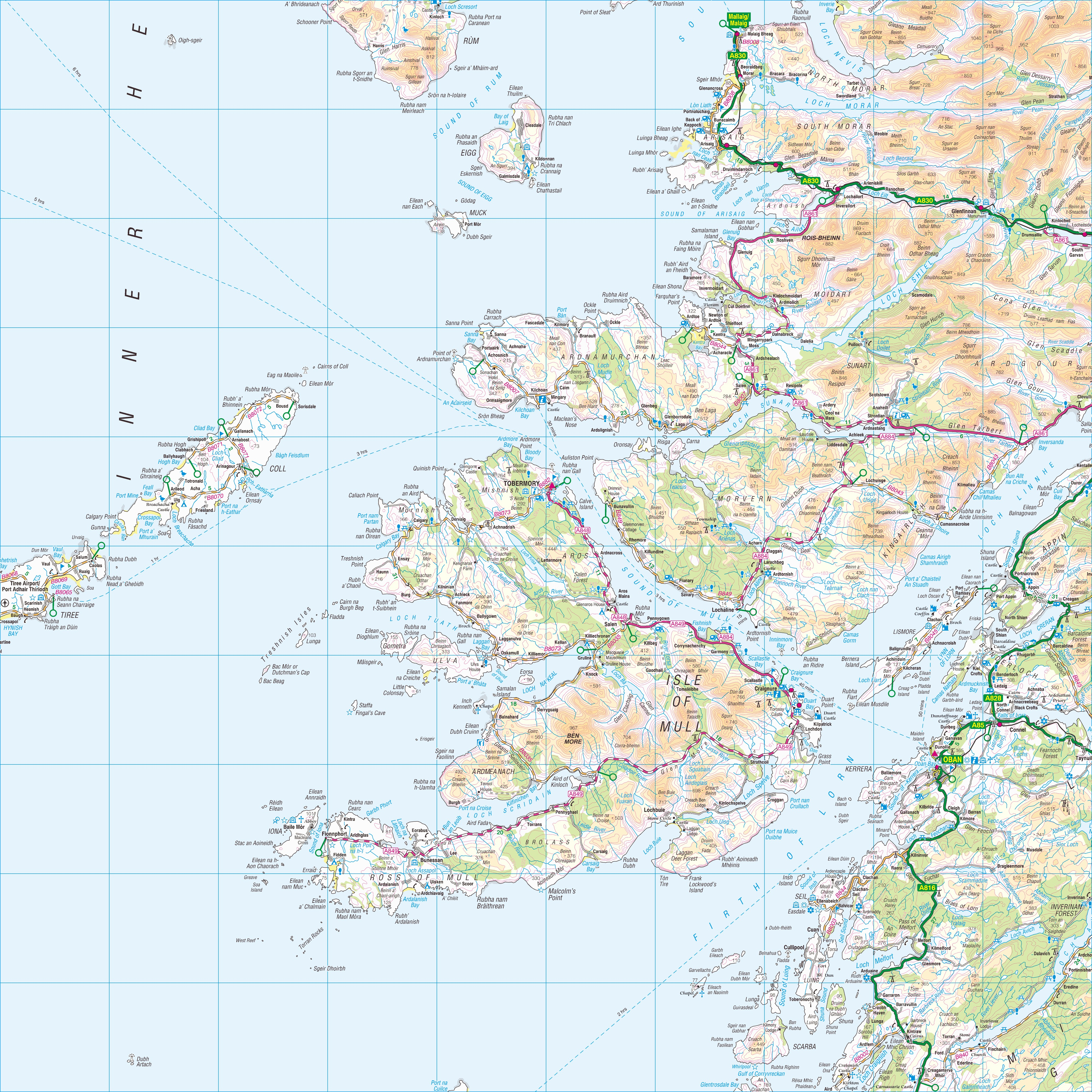
Ordnance Survey 1-250000 - NM

Tobermory’s island location offered a geographic advantage that he used effectively during the Napoleonic Wars, when demand for kelp, barley, fish and timber increased.

During the Napoleonic Wars, the kelp industry became highly profitable as wartime conditions drove up demand and prices for alkali used in glassmaking, soap production, and other key industries.

As the kelp trade collapsed after 1815, Sinclair’s diversified interests in shipping, distilling, and land ownership sustained his growth. He purchased 8,550 acres in Morvern and built Lochaline House, converting mercantile profits into estate value. His issue of local credit notes further strengthened community trust and liquidity, and his active role in estate leasing and improvements contributed to his long-term commercial position.

== Further reading and External Links ==
- P. 180 “In 1819 the Argyll estates in Morvern were exposed to sale,¬” P. 181 Lists land-owners, according to their valuations and John Sinclair, Esq. of Lochaline is 1st.
- Guide to Morvern ancestry, family history, and genealogy
- Family Search. The Free Church.
- “The West Highland Peninsulas” Morvern
- Podcast: 61. John Macfarlane: A talk with Brigadier John Macfarlane who grew up in Tobermory. At 15 minutes and 38 seconds into this talk he refers to his 5th times grandfather Duncan Sinclair who had come from a long line of Tacksmen in Glen Kinglas and his family relationship to John Sinclair and his mercantile activities...
- See: YouTube Video by Stuart McLeod - Dated 21 Nov 2021. This has an aerial view of the trees planted by John Sinclair, between c. 1821 to 1861, around the Lochaline House ruins that lie behind the modern house.
