= Lochaline =

Main village in the Morvern area of Highland, Scotland

Coordinates: 56.539°N 5.779°W

Lochaline: Scottish Gaelic: Loch Àlainn
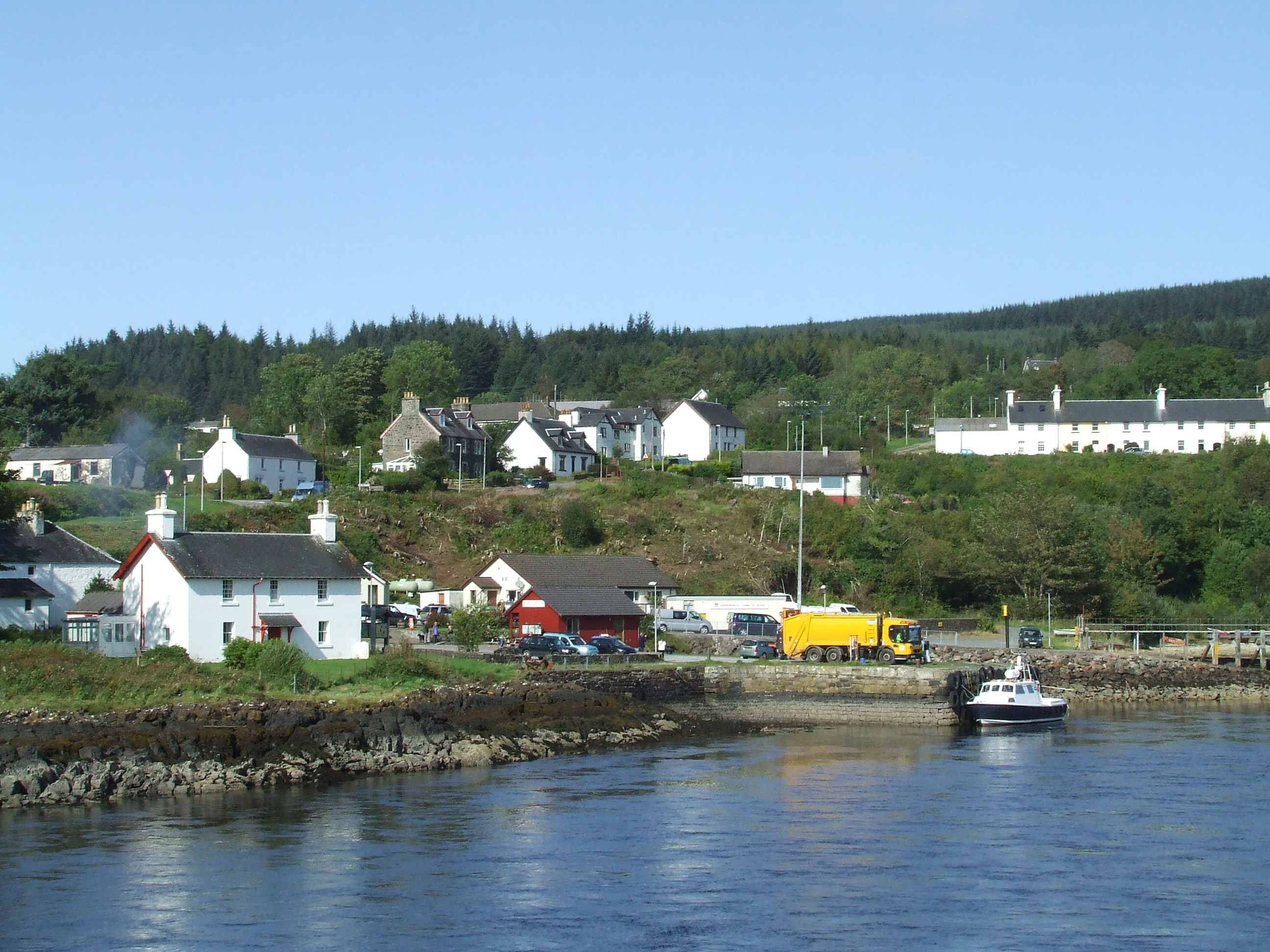
- Lochaline

- Location within the Lochaber area
- OS grid reference: NM6744
- Civil parish: Morvern
- Council area: Highland
- Lieutenancy area: Inverness
- Country: Scotland
- Sovereign state: United Kingdom
- Post town: OBAN
- Postcode district: PA80
- Dialling code: 01967
- Police: Scotland
- Fire: Scottish
- Ambulance: Scottish
- UK Parliament: Ross, Skye and Lochaber
- Scottish Parliament: Skye, Lochaber and Badenoch

Lochaline (Scottish Gaelic: Loch Àlainn) is the main village in the Morvern area of Highland, Scotland. Historian ‘Philip Gaskell’ records that, at the time of the Highland Clearances, in about 1830, John Sinclair of Lochaline founded Lochaline village.

The coastal village is situated at the mouth of Loch Aline, on the northern shore of the Sound of Mull. A ferry operates regularly over to Fishnish on the Isle of Mull.

== Population ==
The current population of Lochaline is around 200 people.

In 1930, some Gaelic-speaking residents of the archipelago of St Kilda were evacuated by Williamina Barclay and relocated to Lochaline. Many of them lived and settled in Lochaline, although with some difficulty.

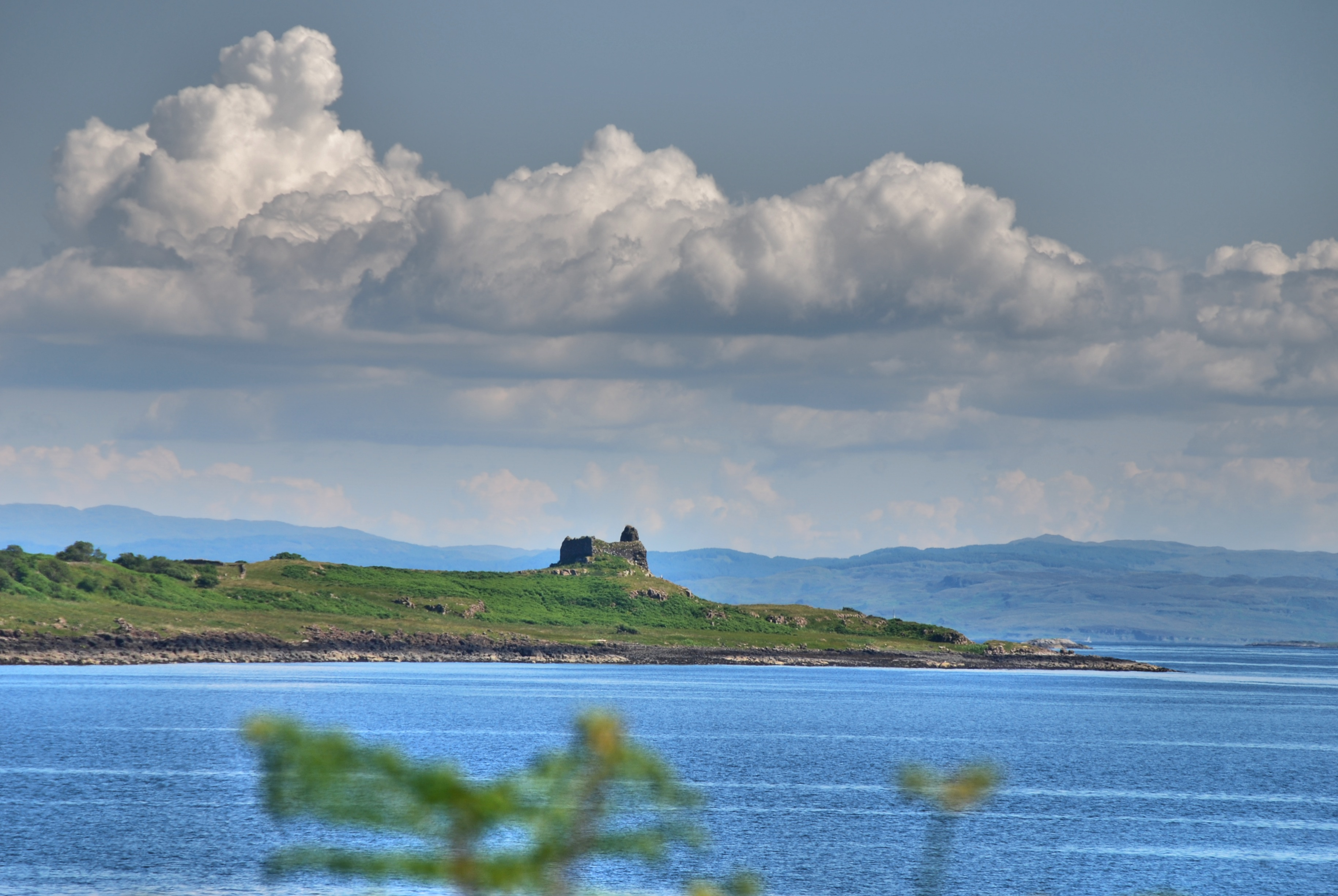
Ardtornish castle as seen from Lochaline

== Transport ==
A regular ferry operated by Caledonian MacBrayne runs over to Fishnish on the Isle of Mull. The ferry takes only about 20 minutes, runs multiple times a day, and day trips from Lochaline are possible.

There is also an infrequent bus service, 507, operated by Shiel Buses – this runs Tuesdays and Thursdays to Fort William in the morning, returning mid-afternoon. Additional journeys are run as far as Ardnamurchan High School on schooldays only.

== Facilities ==
The village's facilities include a grocery shop, post office, petrol station, hotel, restaurant, social club, marina, snack bar and public conveniences.

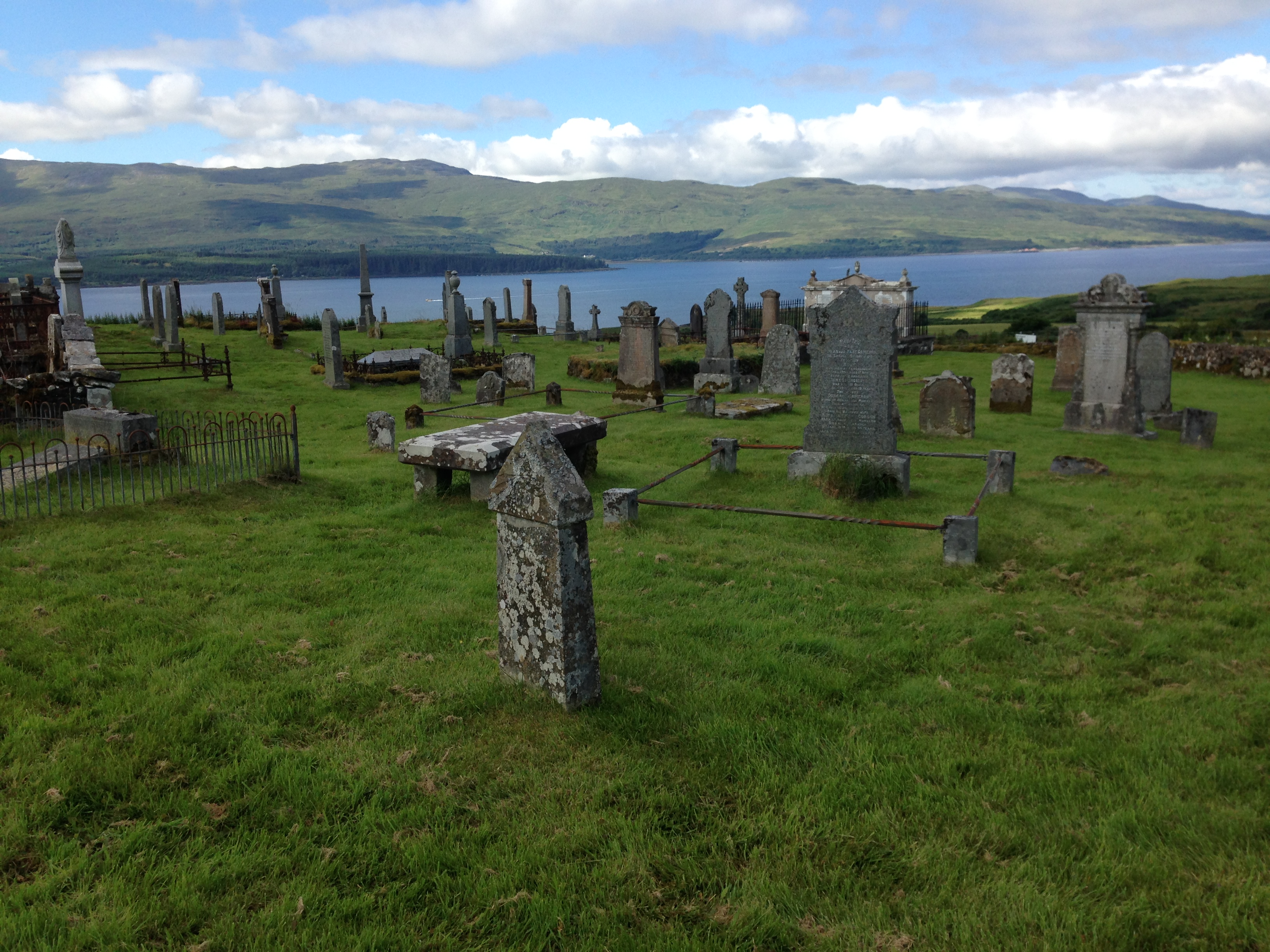
Graveyard by Kiel Church overlooking the Sound of Mull

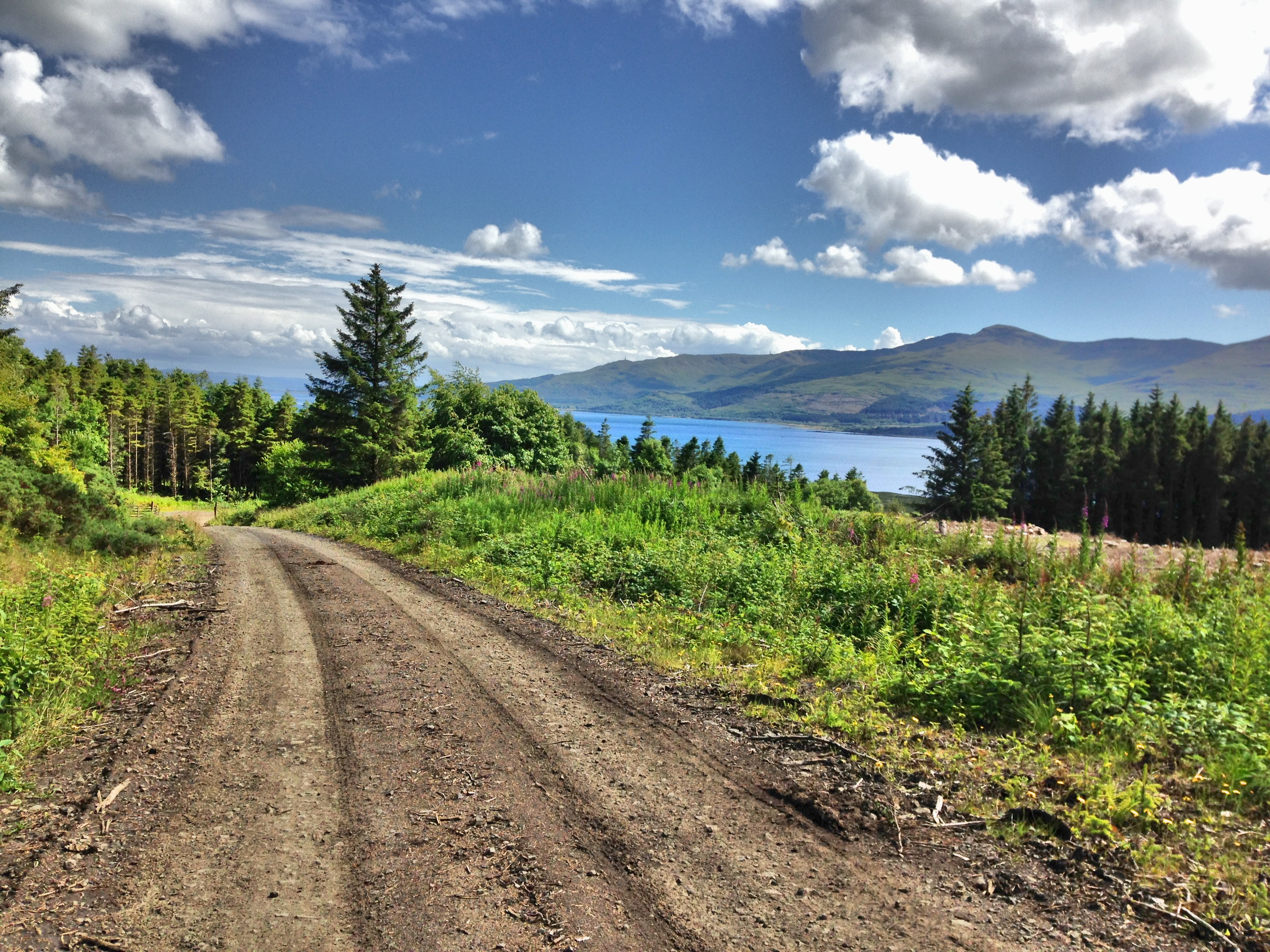
Forest path in Lochaline

The Lochaline hotel, with its beach, has views of the Sound of Mull and the ruins of the old Ardtornish castle.

== Local attractions ==
The village is popular with divers, as it is close to the wrecks of the Sound of Mull, with several charter boats available locally.

=== Kiel Church ===
Set in trees overlooking the Sound of Mull, Kiel Church with a graveyard is one mile away from Lochaline. The interior of the 19th-century church is plain with a braced timber roof. More than 17 medieval carved gravestones are displayed in the church. They are a reminder of the late medieval flowering of Gaelic culture associated with the Lordship of the Isles. Designs include swords, ships and hunting scenes.

Other fragments of medieval stones lay in the graveyard, including a six-hundred-year-old cross.

Kiel takes its name from Cille Choluimchille, the religious cell or monastery of St Columba 'Of the Church' who travelled through Northern Scotland in the 6th-century A.D. with news of the Christian gospel and who built the first church here, as the tradition has it.

=== Ardtornish Estate ===
Ardtornish Estate spreads out around the bay of Loch Aline. The gardens of Ardtornish House are open to the public and include native and exotic plants and trees.

=== Ardtornish Castle ===
The castle was one of the principal seats of the high chiefs of Clan Donald from the early 14th to late 15th century, but Somerled had a fortress here in the mid-12th century. Ardtornish was the hub of strategic sea lanes vital to him. Later, it was at Ardtornish Castle that John of Islay, Lord of the Isles, 6th chief of Clan Donald died in the 1380s and from where his funeral procession sailed through the Sound of Mull to the island of Iona.

The castle was probably abandoned around the end of the seventeenth century, by which time the Campbell Earls of Argyll had captured Ardtornish and the other Morvern estates of the MacLeans.

=== Walking trails ===
The area around the village contains a number of walking paths. These include the coastal walks (the Kinlochaline Low Road and Ardtornish Castle Walk) along the shores of Loch Aline, a small salt water loch, home to fish and birds. Loch is the Scottish Gaelic word for a fresh water body or a sea inlet.

== Geology ==
A silica sand mine has been in Lochaline since 1940, when it was opened to replace sources of silica lost because of World War II. A source was needed for the manufacture of optical quality glass. In November 2008, the announcement was made about closing the mine.

In September 2012, the mine re-opened under a new company Lochaline Quartz Sand Ltd, a joint venture between the Italian mining company Minerali Industriali and glass manufacturer NSG.

The silica quartz and other minerals came from the erosion of the Scottish landmass. They were deposited on the shore of a tropical sea on Jurassic shales and limestones in the middle of the Cretaceous period, 93 million years ago, at the same time, the chalk cliffs of Dover were forming. Frequent changes to sea level reworked the sandy sediment. Natural winnowing processes sorted the quartz from other minerals, separating grains of similar size. For 60 million years, this was protected from erosion by a basalt covering from the Mull volcano.

Near the loch shoreline, today are fossil oysters, or Gryphaea, that lived on the shoreline of a tropical sea here 200 million years ago. The rocks in this layer are the same age as the Jurassic Coast in Dorset.

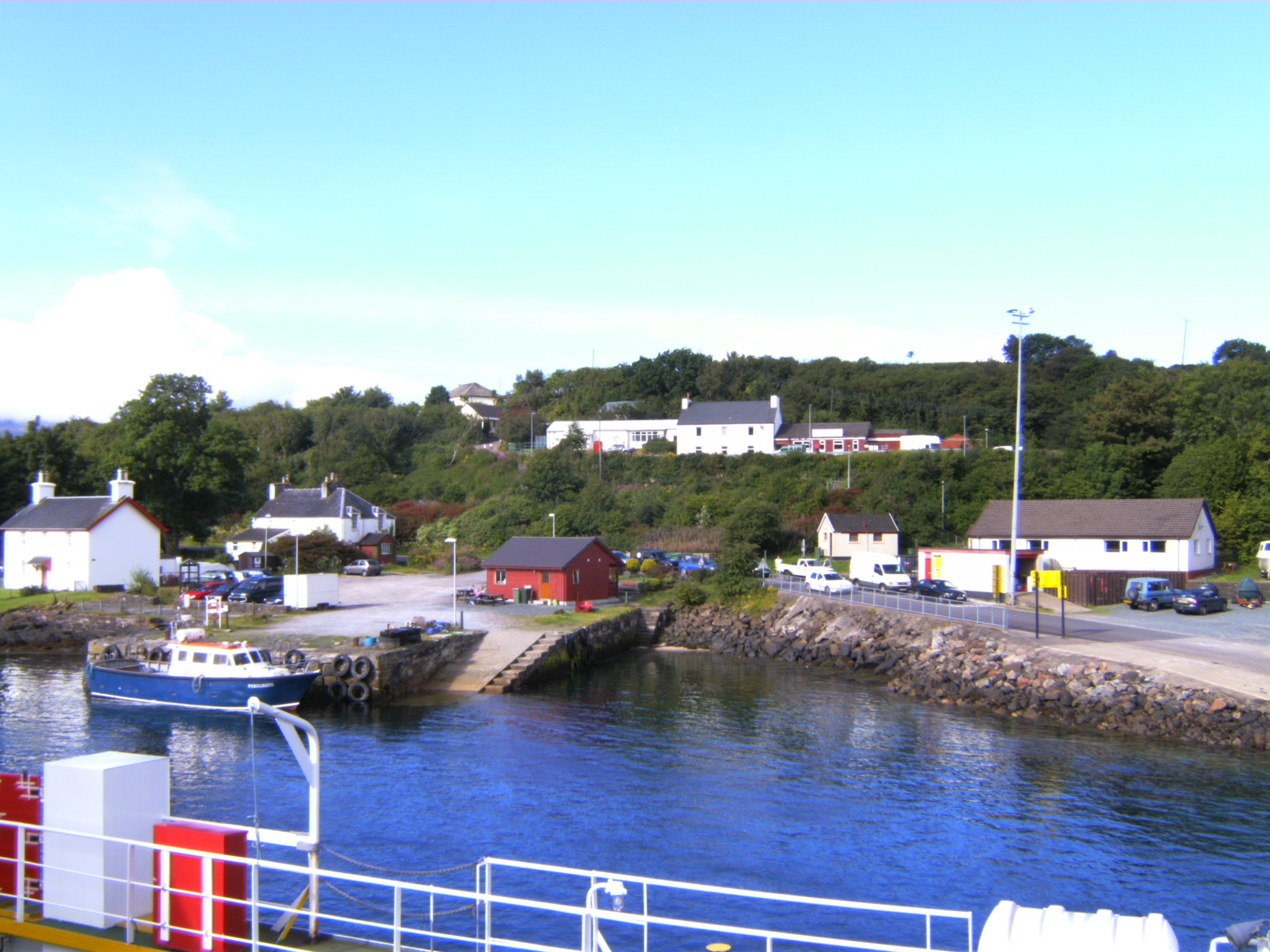
Lochaline as seen from the ferry from Fishnish

== See also ==
- Ardtornish
- Ardtornish Castle
- Isle of Mull
- Iona
- Tobermory
- Fort William
