= Kinlochaline Castle =

Coordinates: 56°33′52″N 5°44′56″W

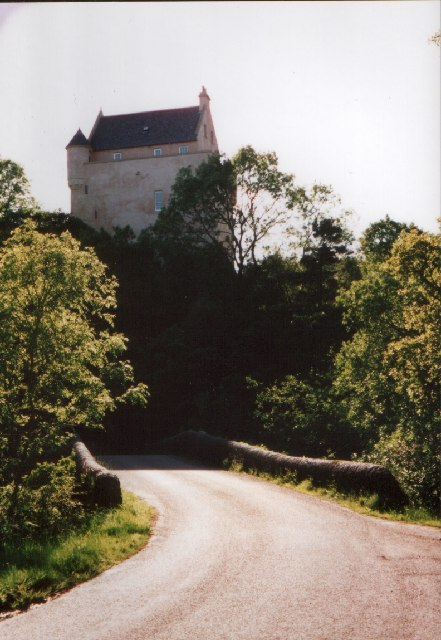
Kinlochaline Castle

Kinlochaline Castle is a 15th-century Scottish tower house on the Ardtornish estate in Morvern in the Highland council area. It is also known as Caisteal an Ime (Scottish Gaelic for Castle of Butter) because a Lady of Clan MacInnes, Dubh Chal (Lady of the Black Veil), is said to have paid the builder with butter equal to the volume of the castle.

== History ==
Kinlochaline Castle is located at the head of Loch Aline, positioned strategically for coastal defence. Four stories tall, 43 by 34 feet (13 by 10 metres), with walls that are 10-foot-thick (3-metre) blocks of rare sandstone. The castle was burned in 1644, when it was besieged by Alasdair Mac Colla during the Wars of the Three Kingdoms. The castle was attacked by the Archibald Campbell, 9th Earl of Argyll in 1679, during a feud. Kinlochaline was abandoned about 1690.

Re-construction in the late 1990s was overseen by Historic Scotland. The castle is now a residence.
