= Ardtornish =

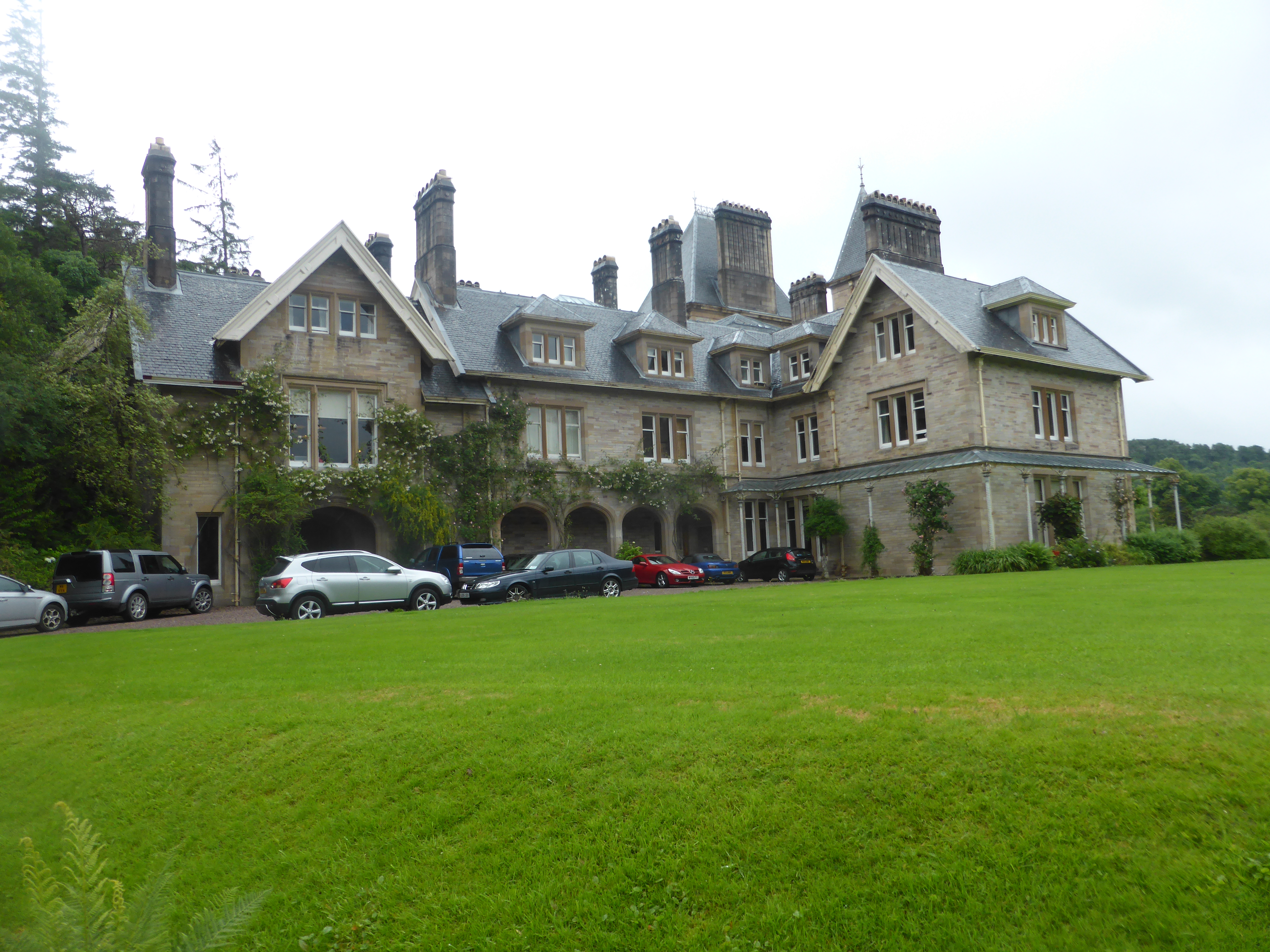
- Ardtornish House

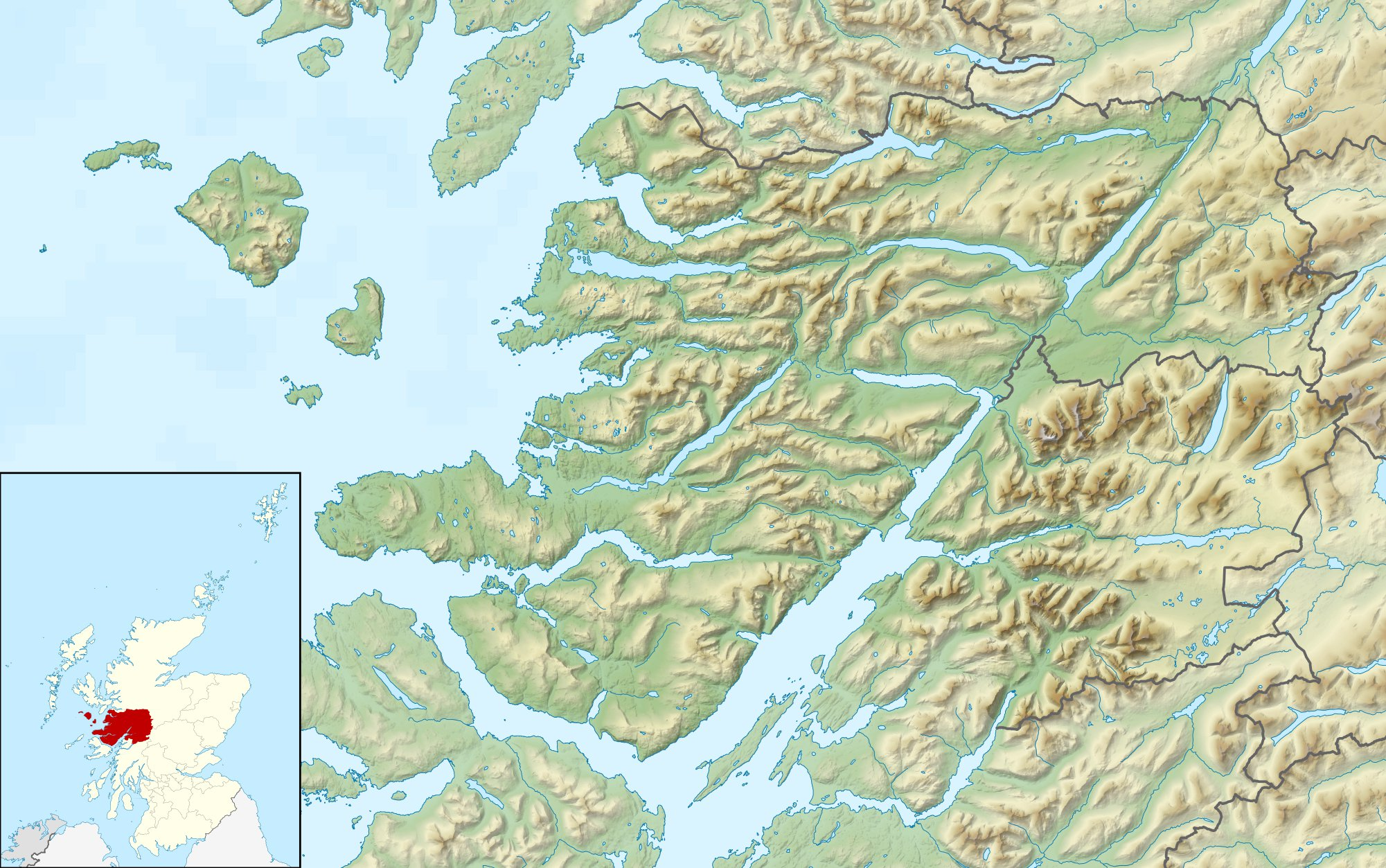
- Location in Lochaber

General information
- Location: Lochaber, Scotland, UK
- Coordinates: 56.54638°N 5.73481°W

Inventory of Gardens and Designed Landscapes in Scotland
- Official name: Ardtornish
- Designated: 1 July 1987
- Reference no.: GDL00024
- OS grid: NM700475

Ardtornish (Scottish Gaelic: Àird Tòirinis) is a Highland estate in Scotland located in Morvern, Lochaber. Ardtornish House is famous for its gardens and the estate is the location of the ruined Ardtornish Castle and the still-inhabited Kinlochaline Castle.

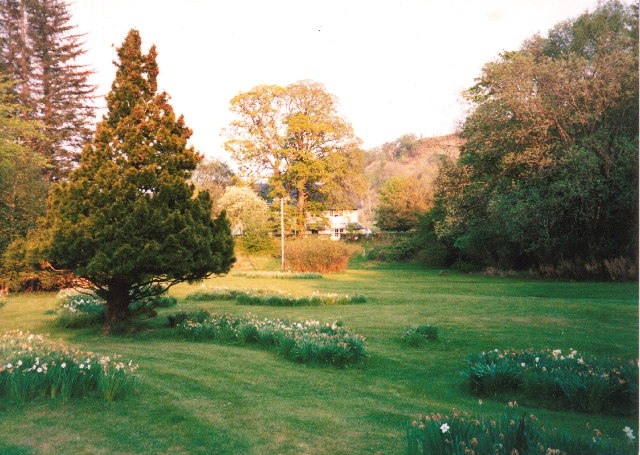
The old Factor's house at Achranich

== History ==
In the mid-18th century the area occupied by the current estate was largely in the hands of Cameron of Glendessary, with some property to the east and south the lands of Maclean of Kingairloch and the Duke of Argyll. A small area near the head of Loch Aline was owned by Murray of Stanhope. By 1800 Cameron's lands were under the control of a variety of new superiors including Maclean of Inverscaddle, MacDonald of Borrodale and MacLachlan of Callart with Stanhope's land also being held by MacLachlan.

By 1850 radical changes had occurred. In 1845 MacDonald's land to the east of Loch Aline had become the 9,000 acres (3,600 ha) Achranich Estate owned by Octavius Smith, a Londoner whose father had made his money in grocery wholesaling and who was himself a successful distiller. To the west, part of Argyll's substantial holdings had been broken up with John Sinclair owning the Lochaline Estate and in the east Argyll's land was in the hands of the notorious Patrick Sellar, who had also purchased the holdings of MacLean and MacLachlan in 1844, which he named the Ardtornish Estate after the pre-existing castle.

== Octavius Smith and family ==
At Whitsun 1860 Smith purchased Sellar's lands and immediately renamed the whole estate "Ardtornish", the name meaning "The headland of Thorir's (or Thora's) promontory". The clearances had by this time affected Morvern – over 3,200 left the parish in the 19th century, 750 of them forcibly evicted – and the bitter memories of the actions of Sellar and his neighbours lived long in the area. Ardtornish, however, seemed to strike a favourable chord with those fortunate enough to be entertained by the estate. Tennyson who missed the opportunity to visit Skye whilst staying there wrote:

If he did not see Loch Coruisk
He ought to be forgiven;
For though he miss'd a day in Skye,
He spent a day in Heaven!

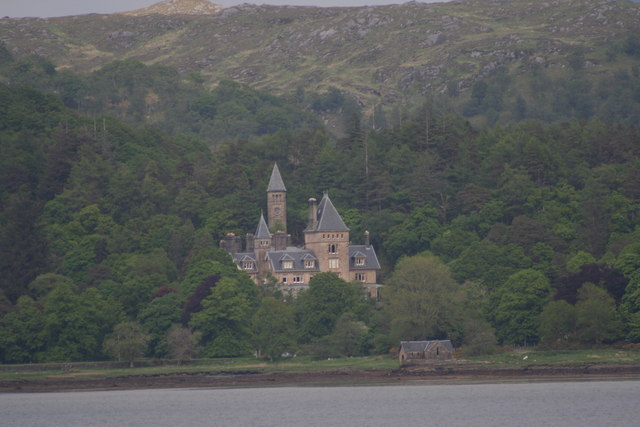
Ardtornish House from Lochaline

Smith's holdings now ran to 30,000 acres (12,000 ha) and employed a staff of thirty. He embarked on the construction of a substantial mansion house with a high clock tower, designed by Alexander Ross of Inverness, which was completed in 1866. However, Octavius did not enjoy his new summer home for long as he died in London in February 1871. Nor did his house long survive him. His son Valentine, who had inherited the estate and the distilling business, knocked it down and built a much larger version in 1884. Only the clock tower from the original remains.

Valentine's new structure is on an heroic scale. At its height, construction employed 160 workers in 1888, and did much to improve local employment prospects at a time when agitation for land reform from the Highland Land League was at its height. Valentine also bought the neighbouring Lochaline estate in 1880, adding another 9,000 acres (3,600 ha) including Morvern's largest settlement, Lochaline. He died in 1906 on board his yacht Rannoch in Gourock Bay, having become something of a recluse in his old age. Latterly, he forbade trespassing on the estate and lived in fear of holidaymakers and tourists.

Ardtornish was inherited by his sister Gertrude, who had married Alexander Craig Sellar, Patrick Sellar's son in 1870. Gertrude took on the management of the estate until 1909 when she handed it over to her unmarried son Gerard, then 38 years old. They continued to live in the new house until the winter of 1929, when they died within a few weeks of one another. Within a year Ardtornish was sold to new owners.

== Smith-Raven family ==
When Owen (1859–1958) and Emmeline Hugh Smith from Langham in Rutland bought Ardtornish in 1930, the extensive gardens may have been a significant part of the attraction. Valentine Smith had laid out 28 acres (11 ha) of formal landscape including lawns, rockeries and walled herbaceous and kitchen gardens and employed up to 12 gardeners to maintain them. The Hugh Smiths, inspired by the gardens of Colonsay House planted a variety of new shrubs, especially rhododendron.

Owen and Emmeline's daughter Faith married the Cambridge don John Raven and the former eventually inherited Ardtornish from her parents.

== Present day ==
Ardtornish is listed by Historic Environment Scotland as being outstanding for its architectural, scenic, and nature conservation importance. The category-A listed Ardtornish House and a number of cottages comprise a visitor enterprise, able to accommodate over 100 guests. The gardens are open to the public. Ardtornish offers deer stalking, river and loch fishing: following a visit in 2013, the novelist Justin Cartwright described “fishing in a place this beautiful” as “an almost transcendent experience”.

Part of the estate is managed in collaboration with the Scottish Wildlife Trust as the Rahoy Hills wildlife reserve – described in Scottish Natural Heritage's magazine as being the Scottish Wildlife Trust's “most biodiverse of its 130 properties."

The estate company has long been interested in hydropower, Ardtornish house for many years being lit with electricity generated by its own small-scale hydro plant. This became obsolete some time after the second world war, but in the early 1990s the estate took advantage of a government renewable energy incentive scheme, the Scottish Renewables Order, and built a 700 kW run-of-river hydro scheme. In 2010, this was supplemented by a further similar-sized scheme in the same catchment (the Tearnait scheme), and the 1990s scheme was decommissioned and replaced with a larger, 1.5 MW turbine, commissioned in December 2012 – the Rannoch Dam scheme. Three more hydropower plants have since been built, including a low-head Archimedes Turbine in the heart of the estate at Achranich – giving a total of 3.3 MW of installed capacity.

The estate received planning permission in 2010 for a new "township" of 20 houses at Achabeag, two miles west of Lochaline. Estate director Hugh Raven said "We intend this to be a nationally-important example of a sustainable new community – with low-impact construction, the highest environmental standards, access to land for food growing and community use, and the possibility of community energy generation." Among the first houses to be completed were two affordable units, built in conjunction with a local housing trust, and available for mid-market rent, and the settlement includes a further five affordable units, as well as a number of timber-framed private houses

Ardtornish is home to one of Europe's few mines for silica sand, producing glass-making material and operated by Lochaline Quartz Sand. It operates an organic farm, selling home-produced beef, lamb, and venison, including to the local Whitehouse Restaurant.
