= Sound of Mull =

Sound between the Inner Hebridean island of Mull and mainland Scotland

- Caol Muile (Scottish Gaelic)
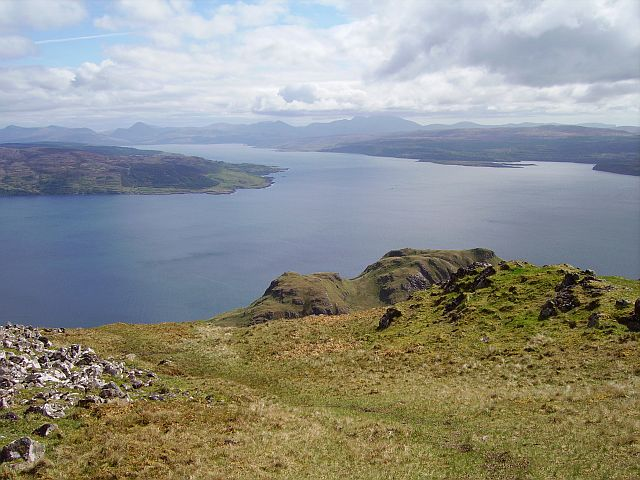
- Sound of Mull from Ben Hiant (Beinn Sheunta)
- Interactive map of Sound of Mull
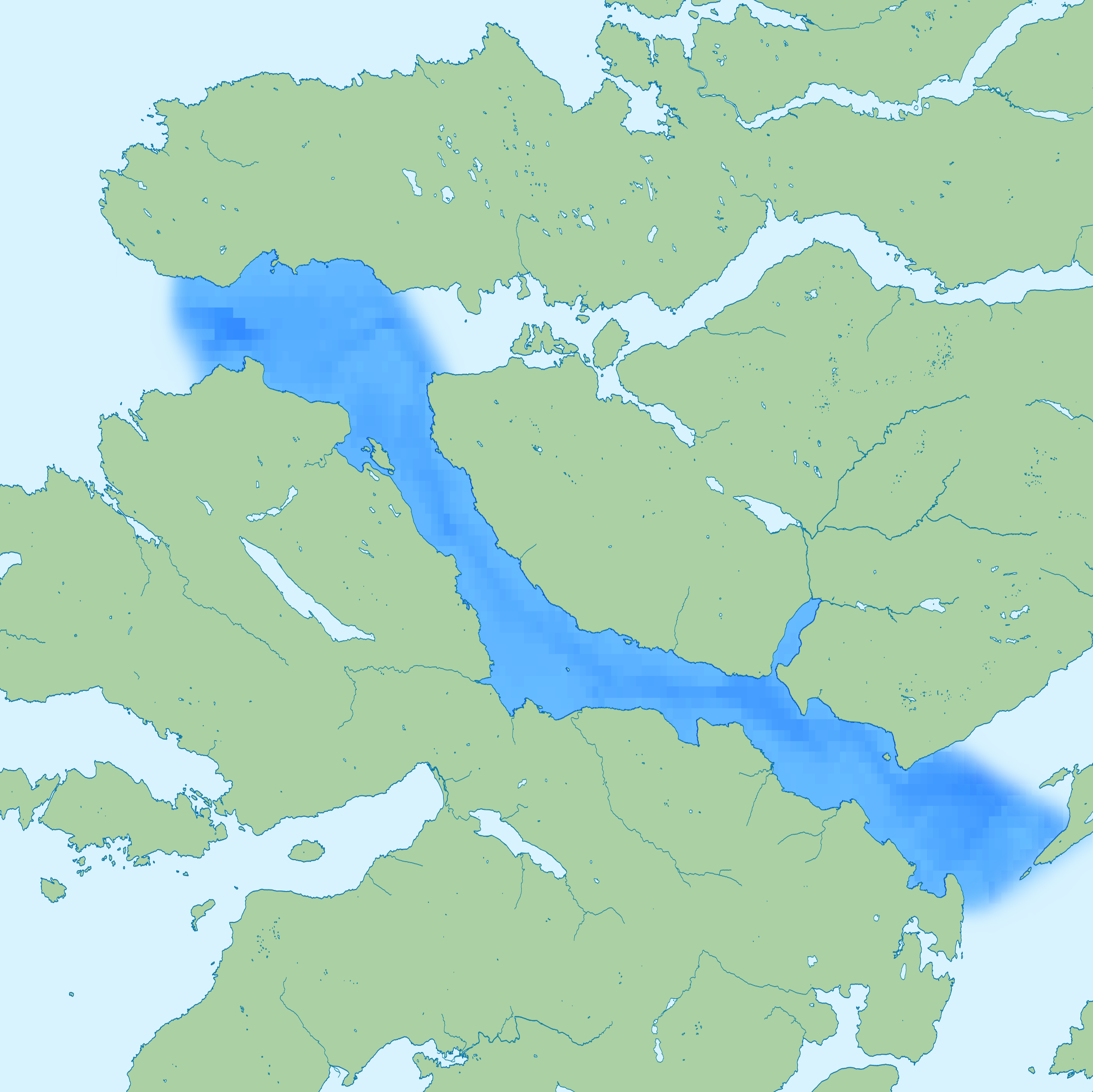
- Map of the Sound of Mull
- Location: Sea of the Hebrides–Loch Linnhe (Atlantic Ocean)
- Coordinates: 56°32′N 5°54′W
- Type: Sound
- Basin countries: Scotland
- Min. width: 2 kilometres (1.2 mi)
- Average depth: 40 metres (130 ft)
- Max. depth: 130 metres (430 ft)
- Islands: Calve Island
- Settlements: Tobermory, Fishnish, Kilchoan, Lochaline, Craignure, Bonnavoulin, Salen

The Sound of Mull (Note: Scottish Gaelic: Caol Muile) is a sound between the Inner Hebridean island of Mull and mainland Scotland. It forms part of the Atlantic Ocean.

The Sound of Mull Project is a Scottish Sustainable Marine Environment Initiative (SSMEI) spatial plan of Argyll and Bute Council which sets out details on the marine, environmental and coastal activities in the Sound.

The largest settlement on the Sound is Tobermory on Mull, which lies near the northern entrance of the Sound.

== Transport ==
There are several ferry routes that use the Sound, most of which originate from Oban. These include the ferry between Oban and Craignure, the main ferry port on Mull, whose main pier was built in 1964. Other ferry routes across the Sound include Tobermory to Kilchoan and Fishnish to Lochaline.

== Wrecks ==
The Sound has long been used for navigation, linking ports such as Oban and Tobermory with the Atlantic. As such, there are a number of wrecks in the Sound. The SS Thesis was a cargo steamship which was wrecked in October 1889 in the Sound.

The SS Hispania, was a Swedish cargo ship that sank on 18 December 1954 after striking a rock.

The wreck of the SS Shuna is located in the Sound. The Shuna was a Glasgow steamer, owned by Messers Glen & Co., that was carrying a cargo of coal and iron from Glasgow to Gothenburg when it struck on the Grey Rocks during a storm in May 1913 and subsequently became a total loss.

The SS Rondo was a First World War US cargo ship that sank in the Sound on 25 January 1935 whilst seeking shelter from a storm.

In 1973, divers from Bristol discovered the wreck of HMS Dartmouth, a fifth-rate ship of the English Council of State. On 11 April 1974, the 1690 wrecksite was one of the first to be designated under the Protection of Wrecks Act. It was redesignated on 25 June 1992. The site became a Historic Maritime Protected Area in 2013.

== Geography ==
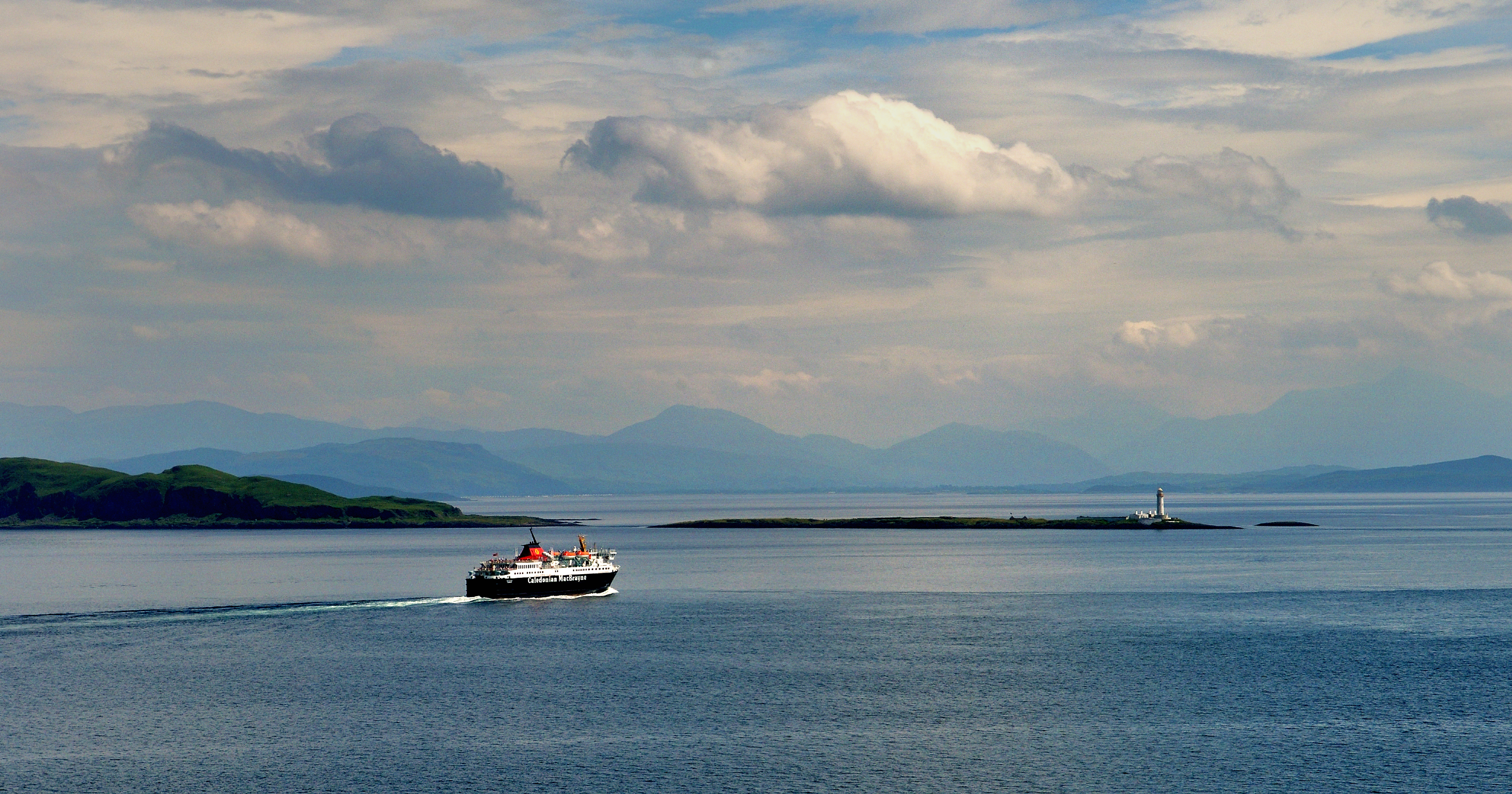
Ferry crossing the Sound of Mull.

There are several islands in the Sound. These include Calve Island, an uninhabited low-lying island.

Bays on the Sound include Ardtornish Bay and Inninmore Bay on the Morvern peninsular.

The western edge of the Sound is guarded by Rubha nan Gall, a lighthouse operated by the Northern Lighthouse Board. The name means "Stranger's Point" in Scottish Gaelic. It was built in 1857 by David and Thomas Stevenson.

The eastern edge of the Sound is marked by two lighthouses, one on each side. Eilean Musdile (Lismore Lighthouse) built in 1833 is on the Isle of Lismore and Duart Point built 1900, in memorial to Scottish novelist William Black on Mull.

== Economy ==
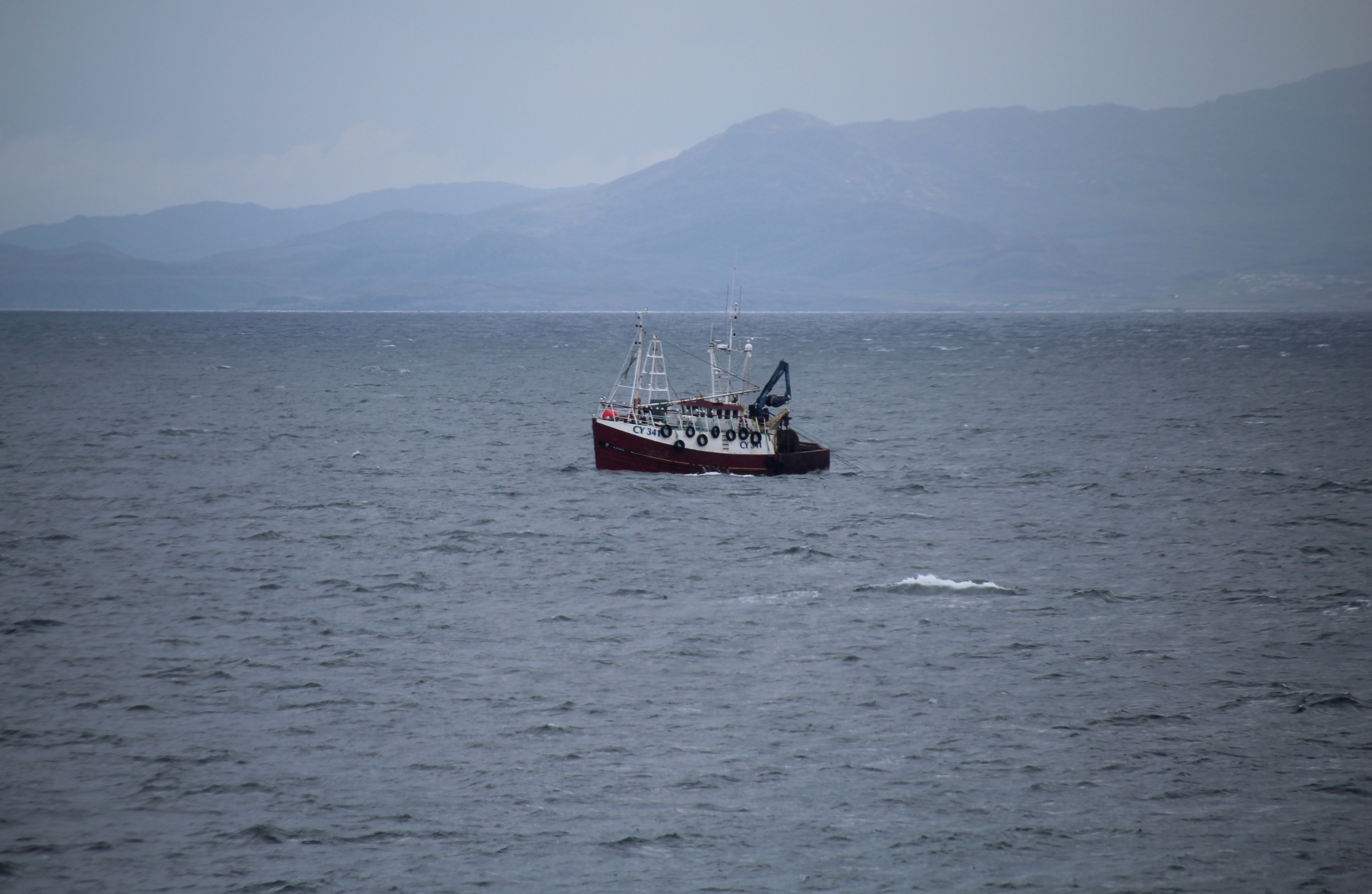
A fishing vessel in the Sound of Mull.

Traditionally, the local economy was based on fishing and agriculture. There are three castles that face the Sound, these are Ardtornish Castle (a 14th-century castle ruin of Clan Donald) and Aros Castle (a ruined 13th-century castle originally of the Clan MacDougall). Duart Castle (Caisteal Dhubhairt) dates back to the 13th century and is the seat of Clan MacLean.

There are two Scotch whisky distilleries sited adjacent to the Sound, these are Nc'nean distillery on the Morvern peninsular and Ardnamurchan distillery on the Ardnamurchan peninsular of Lochaber.

== See also ==
- Sounds of Scotland
