= Ardtornish Castle =

Medieval castle in Morvern, Scotland

Coordinates: 56°31′09″N 5°45′14″W

- Morvern, Scotland
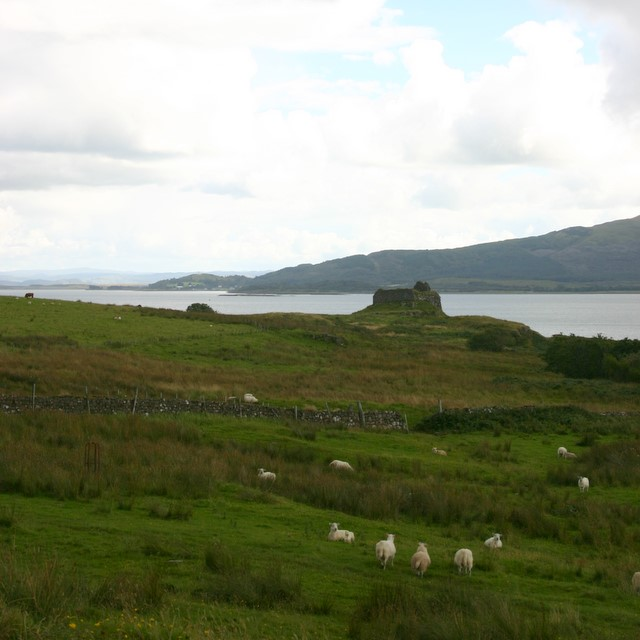
- Ardtornish Ruins with Sound of Mull in background

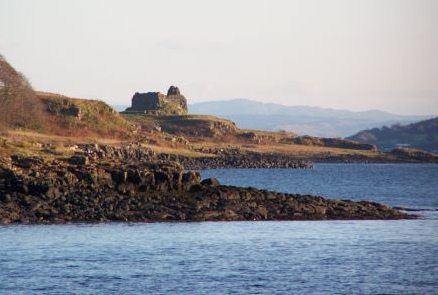
- Ruins at Ardtonish Castle

Site information
- Condition: Ruined

Site history
- Built: 14th Century
- Built by: Clan Donald
- In use: until 17th Century

Ardtornish Castle is a castle situated in the grounds of the Ardtornish estate in Morvern, on the west coast of Scotland. It stands at the seaward end of a promontory which extends in a southerly direction into the Sound of Mull, about 1 mile (2 kilometres) south-east of the village of Lochaline, Highland. It is protected as a scheduled monument.

== History ==
=== 12th – 14th centuries: Clan Donald ===
The castle was one of the principal seats of the high chiefs of Clan Donald from the early 14th to late 15th century, but Somerled had a fortress here in the mid 12th century. Ardtornish was the hub of strategic sea lanes important to him. Later, it was at Ardtornish Castle that John of Islay, Lord of the Isles, 6th chief of Clan Donald died in the 1380s and from where his funeral procession sailed through the Sound of Mull to the island of Iona.

His son and successor, Donald of Islay, Lord of the Isles granted charters dated at Ardtornish, at least two of which have survived, one in Latin and the other in Gaelic, and it was from here, according to tradition, that his galley fleet sailed on their way to transport the vassals of the Isles to the west coast of Ross-shire where they landed to begin their invasion in support of Donald's claim to the Earldom of Ross which resulted in the indecisive Battle of Harlaw in 1411.

Also at Ardtornish Castle, John's great-grandson, also named John of Islay, the fourth and last Lord of the Isles, met the commissioners of King Edward IV of England in 1461 to negotiate the well-known Treaty of Ardtornish-Westminster by which, in return for becoming loyal subjects of the King of England, John, his kinsman Donald Balloch of Dunnyvaig and the Glens and the forfeited Earl of Douglas were each to have a third of the kingdom of Scotland, with generous pecuniary rewards until the conquest of the kingdom had been completed.

=== 15th – 17th centuries: Clan MacLean and abandonment ===
The revelation of this treaty by the English government to the government of Scotland in 1474 resulted in the loss of the Earldom of Ross the following year. In the 1493 aftermath of the Raid on Ross, a decade or so later, John's final forfeiture as Lord of the Isles followed. Following this, the lands of Ardtornish remained for a time in the hands of the Crown but were eventually given to the Clan MacLean chief of Duart Castle, who had already acquired large tracts of land in Morvern.

The castle was probably abandoned around the end of the seventeenth century, by which time Ardtornish and the other Morvern estates of the MacLeans had been captured by the Campbell Earls of Argyll.
