= Loch Aline =

Sea loch in Highland, Scotland

Coordinates: 56°33′N 5°46′W

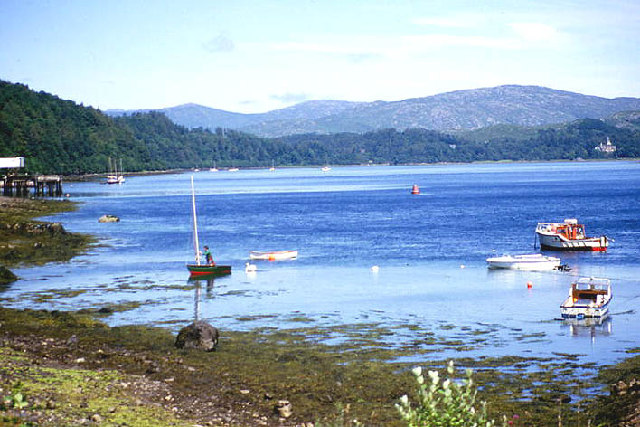
Loch Aline

Loch Aline (Scottish Gaelic: Loch Àlainn) is a small salt water loch home to fish, birds and game, located in Morvern, Lochaber, Scotland. Key features of interest are Kinlochaline Castle, Ardtornish Castle and the Ardtornish estate located at its head.

Lochaline, the main village in Morvern, sits on the north shore, at the mouth of the loch.
