= Morvern =

Coordinates: 56.59°N 5.7°W

Morvern: Scottish Gaelic: A' Mhorbhairne
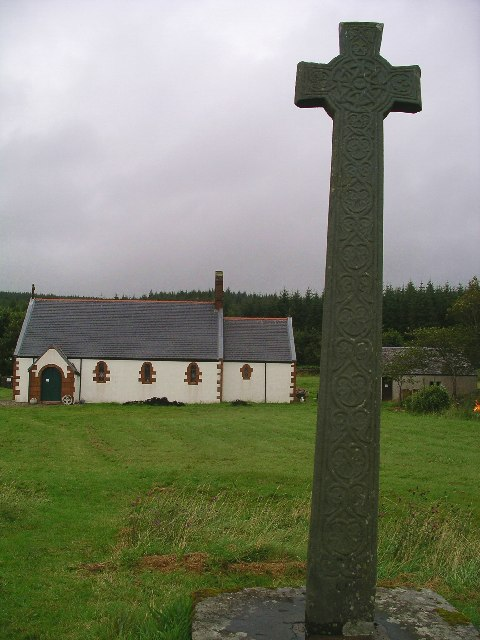
- Kiel Church and the Morvern Cross, at Lochaline; Kiel is derived from Cille Choluimchille, church of Saint Columba

- Location within the Lochaber area
- Population: 320
- Demonym: Morbhairneach
  - Edinburgh: 190 mi (310 km) (road); 149 mi (240 km) (via Corran ferry)
  - London: 567 mi (912 km) (road); 526 mi (847 km) (via Corran ferry)
- Council area: Highland
- Lieutenancy area: Inverness
- Country: Scotland
- Sovereign state: United Kingdom
- Post town: OBAN
- Postcode district: PA80
- Dialling code: 01967
- Police: Scotland
- Fire: Scottish
- Ambulance: Scottish
- UK Parliament: Argyll, Bute and South Lochaber
- Scottish Parliament: Skye, Lochaber and Badenoch

Morvern (Scottish Gaelic: A' Mhorbhairne [ə ˈvɔɾɔ.əɾɲə]; "the sea-gap"), historically also spelt Morven, is a peninsula and traditional district in the Highlands, on the west coast of Scotland. It lies south of the districts of Ardgour and Sunart, and is bounded on the north by Loch Sunart and Glen Tarbert, on the south east by Loch Linnhe and on the south west by the Sound of Mull. The highest point is the summit of the Corbett Creach Bheinn which reaches 853 metres (2,799 ft) in elevation.

Morvern is approximately 250 square miles (650 square kilometres) in area, with a current population of about 320.

== Prehistory and archaeology ==
In 2010, forestry planting by the then Forestry Commission Scotland led to the discovery of a Mesolithic stone tool scatter. Subsequent archaeology excavations also found evidence that people in the Bronze Age also used the same site.

== History ==
Morvern was formerly known as Kinelvadon, which William J. Watson takes to be from Cineal Bhaodain, that is that lands of the Cenél Báetáin, a division of the Cenél Loairn named after Báetán, a putative great-grandson of Loarn mac Eirc. The Senchus fer n-Alban states that "Baotan has twenty houses".

The ruined Ardtornish Castle was in the possession of Somerled in the 12th century and then the Lords of the Isles, whose ownership was recalled in a poem of the same name by Sir Walter Scott. Kinlochaline Castle was once the seat of the MacInnes clan. It was largely destroyed by the army of Oliver Cromwell and restored in 1890.

Before the Highland clearances the population of Morvern was about 2500.

The history of the parish of Morvern in the 19th century has been detailed in Philip Gaskell's Morvern Transformed.

Some residents of St Kilda were relocated to Lochaline, the main village of Morvern, when the island was evacuated in 1930.

On 19th- and early 20th-century Ordnance Survey maps, Morvern is spelled "Morven".

== Governance ==
From 1845 to 1975, most of the peninsula formed the civil parish of Morvern, although the Kingairloch area in the east was part of the civil parish of Ardgour. From 1930 to 1975 Morvern formed part of the landward district of Ardnamurchan in Argyll.

Administratively, Morvern is now part of the ward management area of Lochaber, in Highland council area. It forms part of the traditional shire and current registration county of Argyll.

== Present day ==
Ferries depart from Lochaline to the Isle of Mull. The Morvern Community Development Company (MCDC), the local development trust, was established in 1999. In 2010 it was announced that MCDC would receive support for a full-time development worker from Highlands and Islands Enterprise.

The closure of the silica mine at Lochaline was announced in December 2008, with the loss of 11 jobs. Lochaline Quartz Sand Ltd, a joint venture by Minerali Industriali and NSG Pilkington, reopened the mine in September 2012. The mine produces high quality silica sand which is used in the production of solar panels.

Ardtornish, one of the largest estates in the area, received planning permission in 2010 for a new "township" of 20 houses at Achabeag, two miles (three kilometres) west of Lochaline.

Nc’nean distillery is a Scotch whisky distillery in Drimnin on the Morvern peninsular.

A local area of temperate rainforest is being restored by the Royal Society for the Protection of Birds with the assistance of Scottish Government funding.

== Notable people ==
- John Sinclair of Lochaline
- Duncan McNab, who was born at Achrinich in May 1820, was a Catholic missionary in Queensland and the Kimberley region of Western Australia.
- Very Rev Norman Macleod (1838–1911), Moderator of the General Assembly of the Church of Scotland in 1900, was born in the manse at Morvern.

== See also ==
- Ardgour
- Ardnamurchan
- Glensanda
- Moidart
- Sunart

== Other sources ==
- Maclean, Charles (1972), Island on the Edge of the World, Edinburgh. Canongate.
- Murray, W.H. (1977), The Companion Guide to the West Highlands of Scotland, London. Collins.
