= MV Corran =

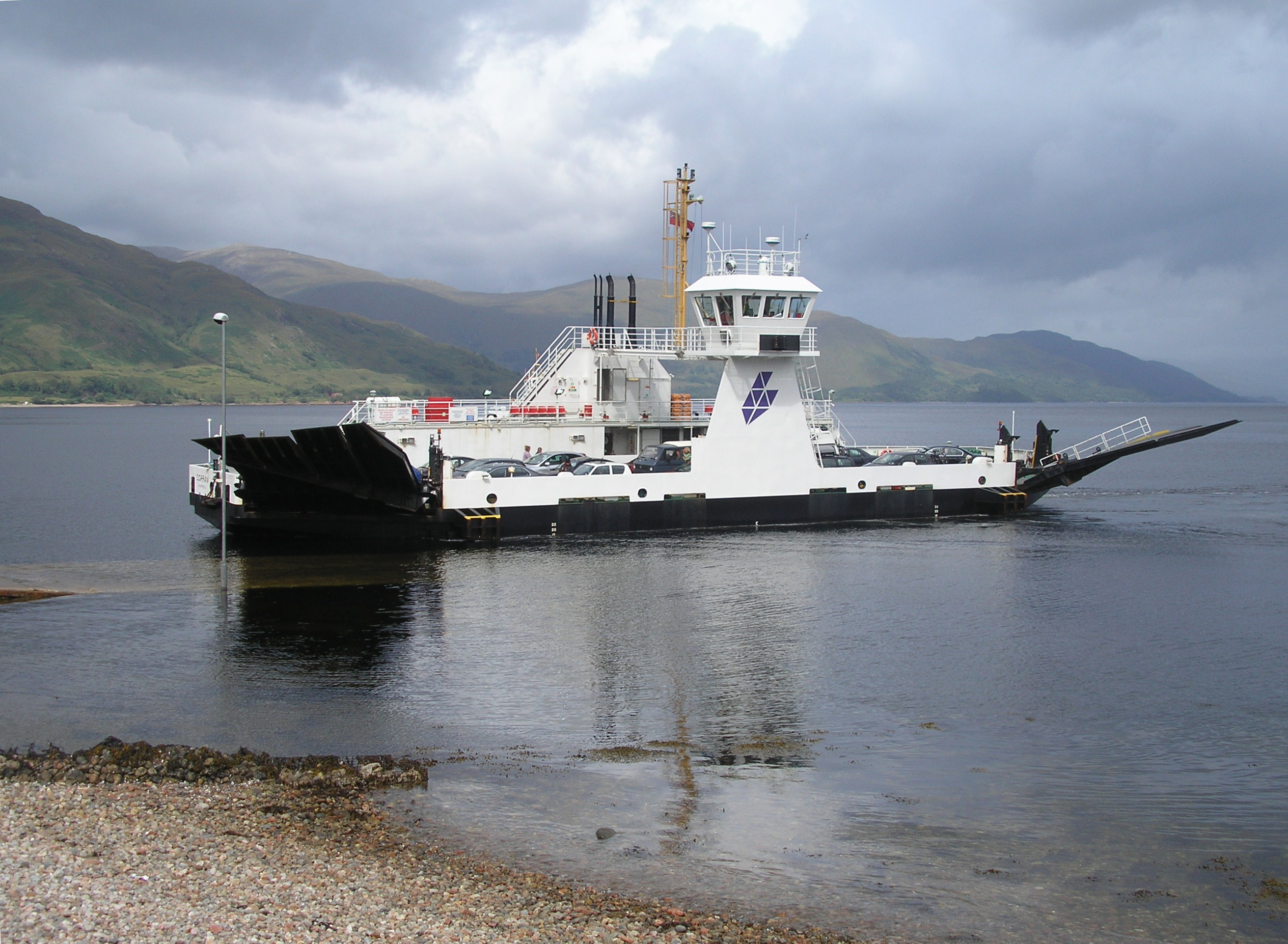
- MV Corran at Ardgour

History

United Kingdom
- Name: MV Corran
- Namesake: Corran, Nether Lochaber
- Operator: The Highland Council
- Port of registry: Inverness, United Kingdom
- Route: Ardgour - Corran, Lochaber
- Builder: George Prior Engineering (Yorkshire) Ltd., Hull
- Cost: £2.9 mill
- Yard number: 360
- Launched: 12 December 2000
- In service: 2001
- Identification: IMO number: 9225990; Callsign: ZNAN4; MMSI Number: 235001223
- Status: in service

General characteristics
- Class & type: vehicle and passenger ferry
- Tonnage: 351 gt
- Length: 42 m (137.8 ft)
- Beam: 15 m (49.2 ft)
- Draught: 2.25m
- Depth: 3 m (9.8 ft)
- Installed power: Cummins: Oil 4SA 2x12cyl (159 x 159mm), 1420bhp
- Propulsion: 2 x Voith Schneider
- Capacity: 28 cars

MV Corran is a Ro/Ro Ferry built in 2001 and operated across Loch Linnhe on the west coast of Scotland.

== History ==
Built by George Prior Engineering (Yorkshire) Ltd. in Hull, Corran was fitted out in the William Wright Dock in February 2001, and entered service later that year.

== Layout ==
MV Corran has a single car deck with offset bow and stern ramps.

== Service ==
MV Corran has operated the Corran Ferry, across Loch Linnhe since late 2001. She was built for this route, between Ardgour and Corran, allowing Rosehaugh to be retired after 32 years in service on various routes across the Highlands. Backup is provided by MV Maid of Glencoul. Planning for Corran's successor started in 2020.

In October 2022, Corran departed for her annual overhaul. The resulting works and delays removed her from service until October 2023, with Maid of Glencoul taking up the service. Maid of Glencoul herself experienced multiple breakdowns, resulting in significant disruption to the service. A passenger-only service operated between Ardgour, Corran, and Fort William.

In November, the Scottish Government announced that £28 million, previously earmarked for improvements to the A9, would be diverted to fund a replacement for Corran, after lobbying from Highland Council.
