= A861 road =

Road in Scotland

Coordinates: 56.68782°N 5.45643°W

A861

Location
- Country: United Kingdom
- Constituent country: Scotland

Road network
- Roads in the United Kingdom; Motorways; A and B road zones

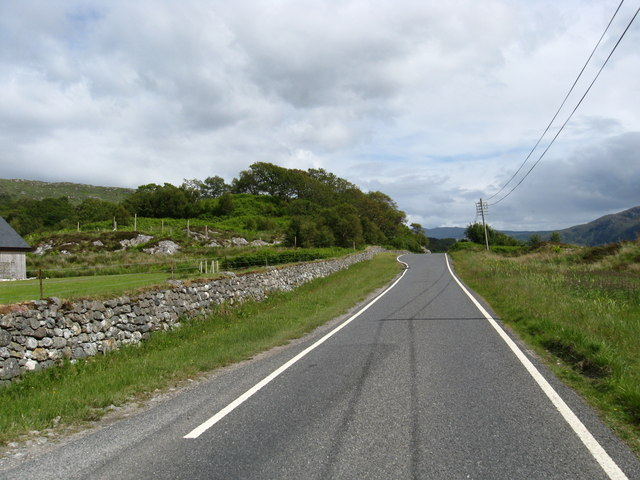
A861 near Resipole in June 2009

The A861 road is a circuitous, primarily coastal, road in Lochaber, within the Highland council area of Scotland.

The A861 serves the communities of the remote Ardgour, Sunart, Moidart and Ardnamurchan areas Although the ends of this road are only 14 miles (23 km) apart (the direct link being by way of the A830 road) its total length is 80 miles (130 km).

The last stretch to be built was the part from Kinlochmoidart to Lochailort. It was opened on 29 July 1966 by the Minister of State for Scotland, George Willis M.P. Mr Willis described it as the longest completely new road to be built in Scotland since the days of Thomas Telford, 150 years earlier.

== Route (clockwise) ==
The A861 is a long-way-round route in the Lochaber area of western Scotland, connecting the A830 Fort William to Mallaig road with itself via the shores of Loch Sunart.

- junction with the A830 road west of Kinlocheil
- under the West Highland Line
- through Drimsallie
- eastwards along the south shore of Loch Eil, through Garvan, Duisky and Blaich
- until Loch Eil meets Loch Linnhe and the road turns generally southwestwards through Camusnagaul and Trislaig to Ardgour where the Corran Ferry provides a vehicular crossing to Corran and the main A82 road
- the A861 them continues to along the western shore of Loch Linnhe to Inversanda and where it strikes inland westwards through Glen Tarbert; the B8043 road leaving about half a mile from Inversanda to follow the southwesterly route
- after passing through Achnalea the A861 resumes its coastal nature when it follows the north shore of Loch Sunart
- near this is its only junction (other than its terminuses) with another A-road when the A884 road diverges
- continuing westward the road goes through the lochside communities of Strontian, Ardnastang, Woodend, Camasachoirce and Camasine turning slightly to the north to follow the loch to Resipole and Salen
- the coast of Loch Sunart is now followed by the B8007 as the A861 strikes inland due north to Acharacle where the B8044 leaves to the west
- the A861 then turns east to go through Blain, Mingarrypark and Dalnabreck;
- it then turns north and then northwest to reach Loch Moidart and the settlements of Ardmolich and Kinlochmoidart
- after following the loch shore it again strikes inland to reach the Sound of Arisaig at Glenuig
- the route is then generally northeastwards along the south shore of Loch Ailort through Inverailort to meet the A830 at Lochailort.
