= Unapool =

Settlement in Sutherland, Scotland

Coordinates: 58.249648°N 5.0060232°W

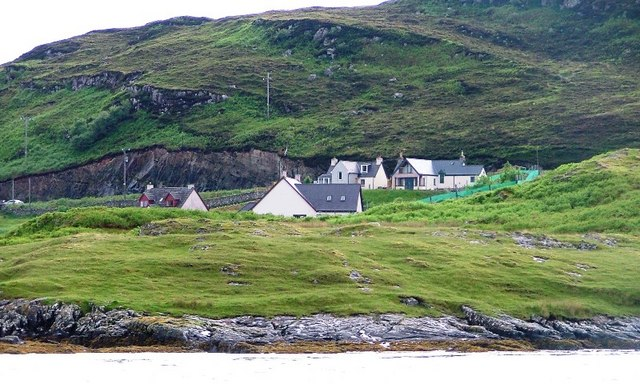

- Location within the Highland council area
- Area: 68 km^{2} (26 sq mi)
- Population: 57 (2011)
  - Density: 1/km^{2} (2.6/sq mi)
- Civil parish: Assynt
- Council area: Highland
- Country: Scotland
- Sovereign state: United Kingdom
- Police: Scotland
- Fire: Scottish
- Ambulance: Scottish

Unapool is a small settlement in the Assynt district of Sutherland in the Highland council area of Scotland. It is located on the A894 between Durness and Ullapool. Ullapool and the A835 are located nearly 30 miles away. The nearest settlements to Unapool are Kylesku and Newton. Loch Unapool is nearby and the village is sandwiched between Loch a Chairn Bhain, Loch Gleann Dubh and Loch Glencoul.

The settlement is not home to many permanent residents. However, Unapool and neighbouring Kylesku have a few holiday cottages. In 2011 it had a population of 57. The Nearby Kylesku Bridge is the nearest attraction other than the lochs.
