= Achaphubuil =

Coordinates: 56.83622°N 5.14036°W

Achaphubuil: Scottish Gaelic: Achadh a' Phùbaill
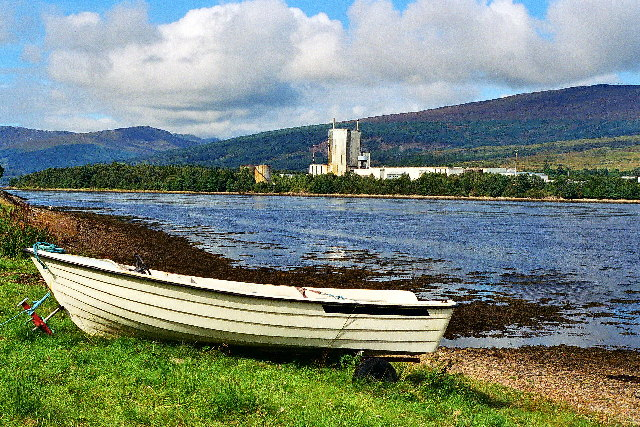

- Location within the Lochaber area
- OS grid reference: NN085760
- Council area: Highland
- Country: Scotland
- Sovereign state: United Kingdom
- Post town: FORT WILLIAM
- Postcode district: PH33
- Police: Scotland
- Fire: Scottish
- Ambulance: Scottish
- UK Parliament: Ross, Skye and Lochaber
- Scottish Parliament: Skye, Lochaber and Badenoch

Achaphubuil (Scottish Gaelic: Achadh a' Phùbaill- the field of the tent or pavilion) is a small settlement to the north of Ardgour in Lochaber, in the Highlands of Scotland. Achaphubuil lies to the south of The Narrows, which link Loch Linnhe to Loch Eil. The village of Corpach is on the opposite shore, with Fort William across Loch Linnhe to the north-east.

Achaphubuil is spread out along the A861 road, which runs along the shore of the loch.

There was a foot ferry between Achaphubuil and Corpach across Loch Eil.

Achaphubuil had a small primary school, which closed in 2010.
