= Inninmore Bay =

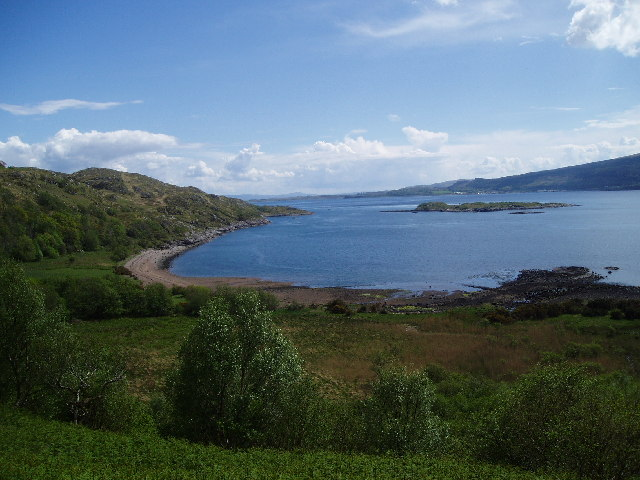
- Inninmore Bay. Facing south-east down the sound of Mull. Craignure can be seen on Mull

- Location within Argyll and Bute
- Location: NM72244142
- Coordinates: 56.5096°N 5.70314563°W
- Type: bay
- River sources: Dearg Allt
- Islands: Eilean Rubha an Ridire, Glas Eileanan

Inninmore Bay is a small shallow coastal embayment, on a chord of 1.74 miles, on a 215° orientation, in the Morvern peninsula in Lochaber, in the western coast of Scotland, and is some three miles east-south-east of the entrance to Loch Aline.

== Settlements ==
Inninmore Bay is the location of a clearance village that consists of five houses that were known to be occupied in 1770, with only two occupied by 1841 and one by 1851. A further cottage on the bay was built in 1862 and abandoned in 1939. The outline of five to six further buildings are known to exist there and were thought to have been abandoned sometime before 1755. Two of the cottages have since been renovated.

== Geography ==
Directly west from Inninmore Bay is the Sound of Mull, the Sound that runs from Aulston Point and Tobermory in the North to the Rubha Fiart and Duart Point on the Isle of Mull, in the west. To the northwest is Ardtornish Bay that can be partially seen from the bay and Ardtornish Point that describes the leftmost curve of Ardtornish Bay at the north end of the bay. To the northeast in the direction of the bay going inland, the land us flat in places 200m to 300m from the bay, before rising sharply to a plateau that continues inland some 18 km inland, in places, following the curve of Loch Linnhe in the south, before it meets the fault that contains Loch Sunart in the north and Glen Tarbert and the A861 road in the east.

At the south end of the bay, several islands groups can be seen, almost in a straight direction from the south end of the bay, across to Mull. The first island is Eilean Rubha an Ridire, the second is Glas Eileanan that contains a lighthouse that is in mid-channel, then the rocks of Sgeir nan Goghar, followed by the rocky outcrop on Mull itself called Sgeir Mhic Chomhain. Craignure Bay on Mull that is directly south of the rocky outcrop can be seen clearly from the bay. Craignure Bay on Mull is where the ferry from Oban calls into.

== Fish traps ==
Inninmore Bay is known for containing a former tidal stone fish trap with a radius of 54 metres and consists of a simple semicircle that is centred on a small stream that enters the bay.

== Quarry ==
Close to the mouth of Dearg Allt burn are three sandstone quarries that were worked for over a 500-year period from the 13th century and appear to have stopped operations sometime in the 19th century.

== Marine accident ==
On 30 June 2016, the 17m scallop dredger St Apollo grounded on the small island in the bay, during a severe squall. All five crew members were uninjured and later taken ashore at Oban.
