= Kylesku =

Coordinates: 58.256840°N 5.018037°W

Kylesku: Scottish Gaelic: An Caolas Cumhang
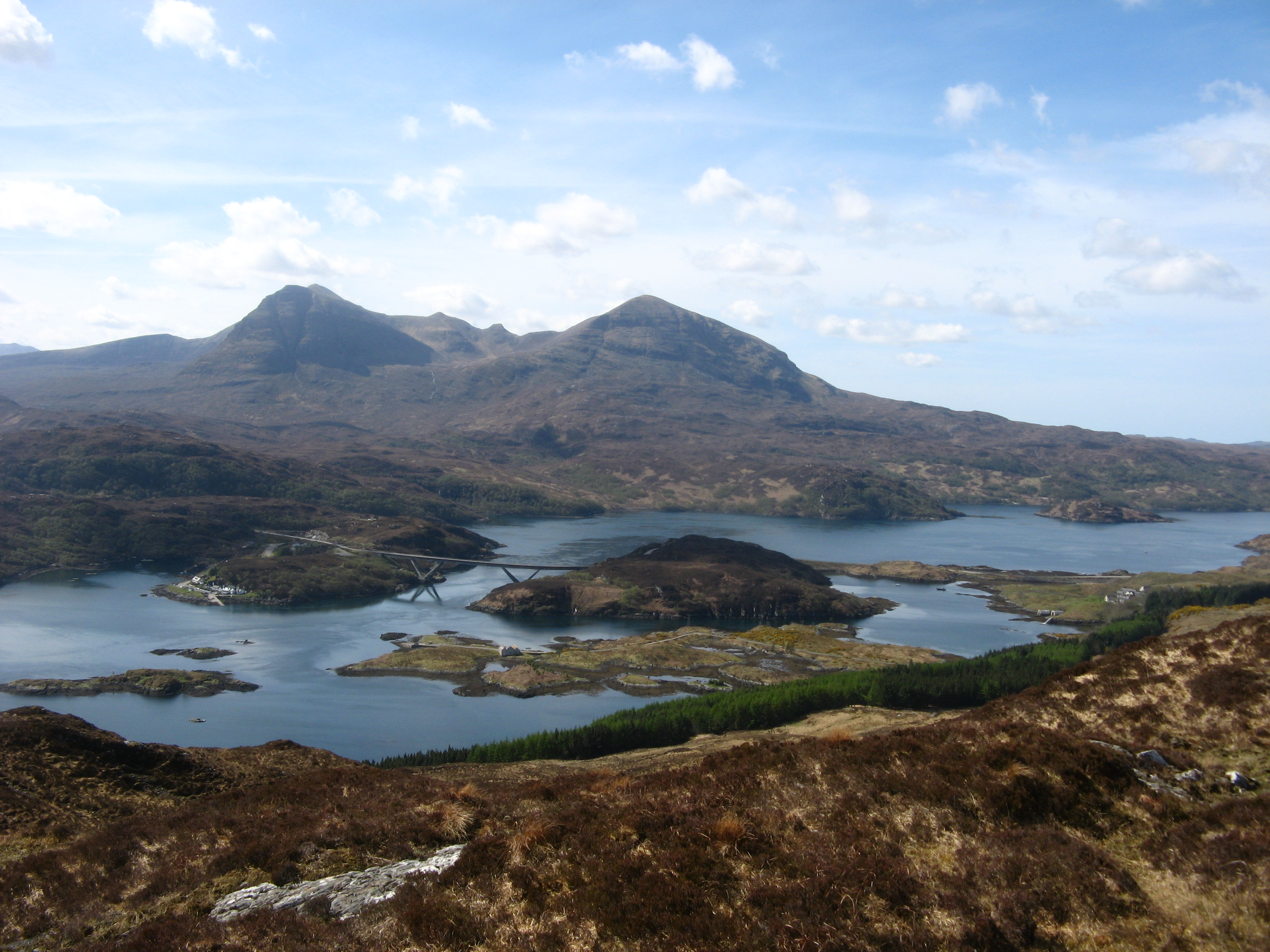
- Kylesku and surroundings

- Location within the Sutherland area
- OS grid reference: NC230336
- Civil parish: Assynt
- Council area: Highland
- Lieutenancy area: Sutherland
- Country: Scotland
- Sovereign state: United Kingdom
- Post town: LAIRG
- Postcode district: IV27 4
- Police: Scotland
- Fire: Scottish
- Ambulance: Scottish
- UK Parliament: Caithness, Sutherland and Easter Ross
- Scottish Parliament: Caithness, Sutherland and Ross

Kylesku (Scottish Gaelic: An Caolas Cumhang) is a fishing hamlet in Sutherland in the Scottish Highlands. Until 1984, it was the site of a free ferry. It takes its name from Caolas Cumhann, Gaelic for "narrow strait", which is the channel just to the west of the village that connects Loch Glencoul and Loch Glendubh to Loch a' Chàirn Bhàin .

== Village ==
Kylesku is located where Loch Glencoul and Loch Gleann Dubh join to form a sea passage Loch a' Chàirn Bhàin which links to Eddrachillis Bay. It is in the Scottish council area of Highland.

The village stretches back along the road from the slipway that used to be the southern end of the ferry crossing. Now by-passed by the main road carried over the bridge, the Kylesku Hotel overlooks the slipway. Nearby is Eas a' Chual Aluinn, Britain's highest waterfall. This can be visited on a boat trip aboard Rachael Clare.

Kylesku sits at the centre of a 2,000 km^{2} (770 mi^{2}) area which has become Scotland's first 'Global Geopark'. There is abundant wildlife and a wide range of outdoor pursuits in or on the lochs, mountains and white sandy beaches, including bird watching, seal and otter spotting, fishing, climbing and hill walking.

== Ferry ==
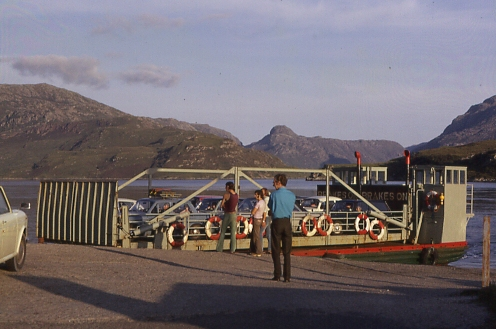
Queen of Kylesku in 1971

A rowing boat provided a ferry service across the strait in the early 19th century. Commercial traffic mainly comprised cattle on their way to central Scotland, and they had to swim across. Over the years, various ferries came and went, and small car-carrying ferries first appeared between the wars. The Kylesku Ferry was free for much of its existence.

The Maid of Kylesku, a four-car ferry, was built for the Kylesku crossing in the early 1950s, where it was operated until replaced by the Queen of Kylesku in 1967. When no longer needed, the Maid of Kylesku was beached on the opposite side of the bay.

In 1976, the Maid of Glencoul, built in Ardrossan, became the first vessel capable of carrying fully loaded commercial vehicles. After the opening of the Kylesku Bridge, it was used as the Corran Ferry.

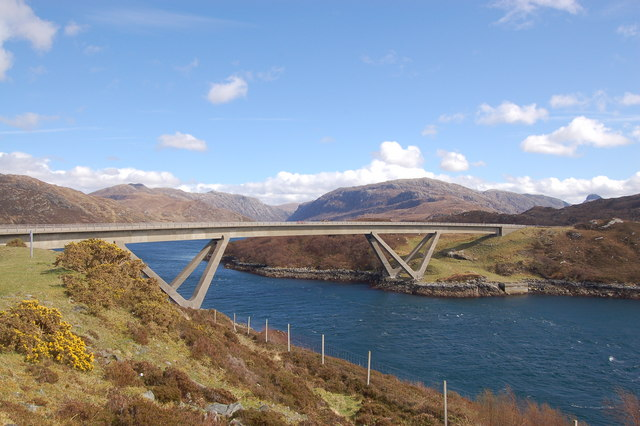
The A894 road bridge across the Kyles from Kylesku to Kylestrome

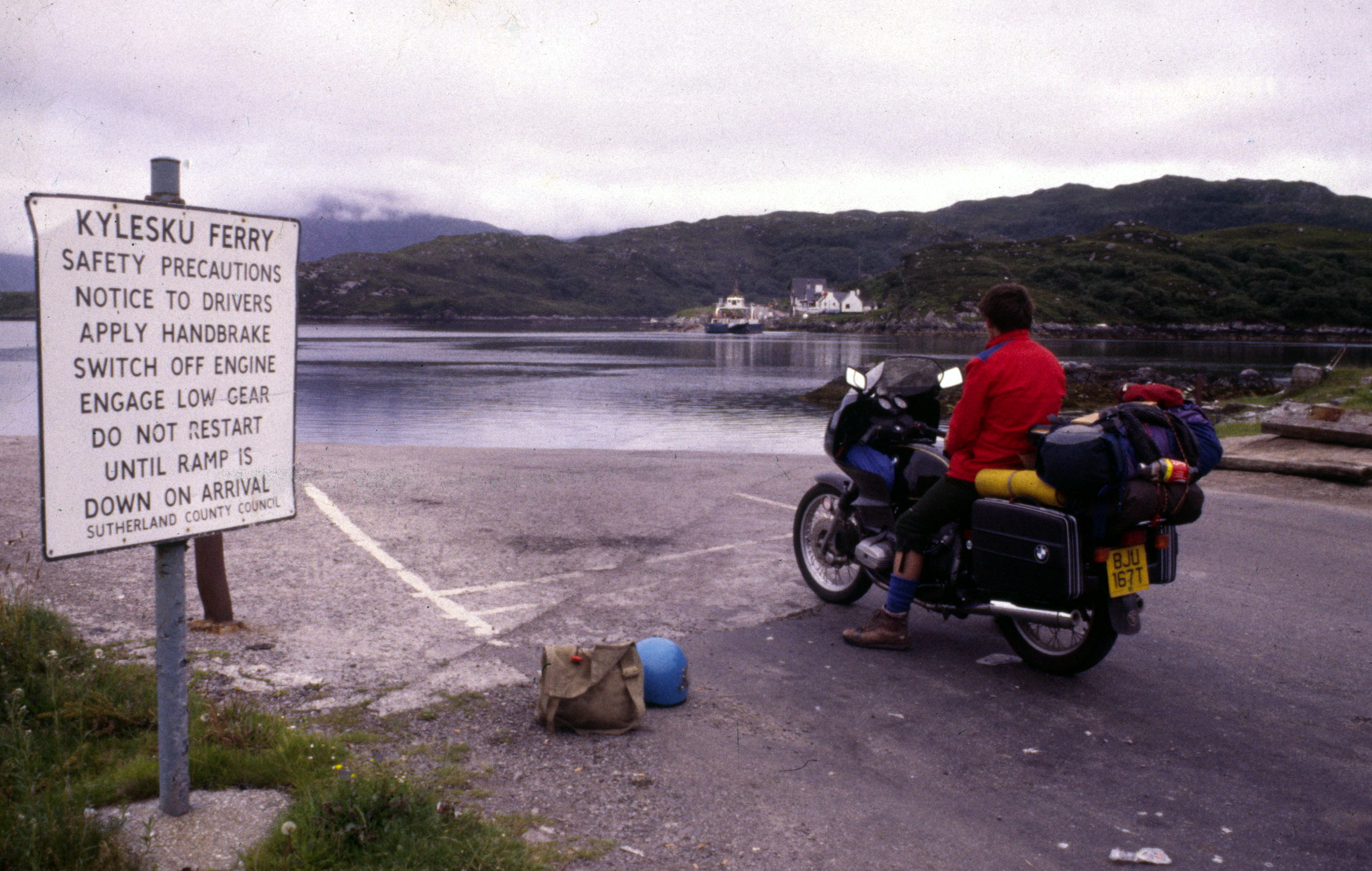
Waiting for the Kylesku Ferry

== Bridge ==
The ferry service became a major bottleneck on the route as traffic increased, and was replaced by the Kylesku Bridge in 1984. Opened by Queen Elizabeth II, the bridge is 276 metres (906 ft) long and crosses a 130-metre (430 ft) stretch of water. The curving, five-span, continuous, pre-stressed concrete, hollow bridge has been described as one of the most beautiful bridges in the world. The bridge was built by Morrison Construction and designed by the architects Arup, and it has won several design and construction awards.

A cairn on the north side, erected in 1993, commemorates the 50th anniversary of the formation of the XIIth Submarine Flotilla, a unit of "X-craft" and "Chariot" miniature submarines, which trained in Lochs Glendhu and Glencoul from 1943.
