= MV Maid of Glencoul =

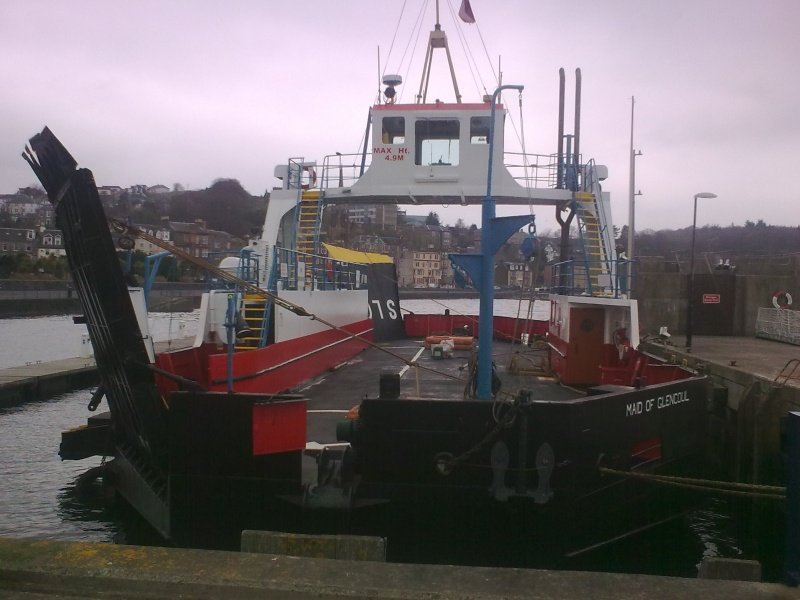
- MV Maid of Glencoul at Rothesay pier

History

United Kingdom
- Operator: Highland Council
- Route: Corran Ferry
- Builder: MacCrindle Shipbuilding Ltd, Ardrossan
- Yard number: 434
- Launched: 3 September 1975
- In service: 1975
- Identification: IMO number: 7521613; Callsign: MEHH7
- Status: service suspended

General characteristics
- Class & type: Passenger/vehicle ferry
- Type: roll-on/roll-off ferry
- Tonnage: 80 DWT; 166 GT
- Length: 105 ft (32.0 m)]
- Beam: 33 ft (10.1 m)
- Depth: 6.9 ft (2.1 m)
- Installed power: Twin diesel 2 x M6cy 500bhp
- Propulsion: 2scr Type 3406PCTA
- Speed: 8 kn (15 km/h; 9.2 mph)

MV Maid of Glencoul is a Highland Council ferry, previously at Kylesku and now at Corran.

== History ==
Maid of Glencoul was built in Ardrossan for Highland Council in 1976.

== Layout ==
Maid of Glencoul has a single car deck with offset bow and stern ramps.

== Service ==
Built for Kylesku, she was the first vessel there capable of carrying fully loaded commercial vehicles. After the opening of the Kylesku Bridge, in 1984, she became the Corran Ferry. She is now the backup vessel at Corran, providing cover for MV Corran's annual overhaul, and for any breakdowns.
