= Ardgour =

Scottish parish and area of Scotland

Coordinates: 56.74°N 5.34°W

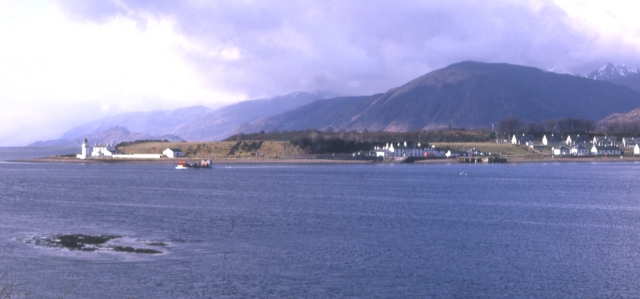
Looking across Loch Linnhe to North Corran and Ardgour, Sgurr na h-Eanchainne (731 m) behind

Ardgour (/ˌɑːrdˈɡaʊr/) (Scottish Gaelic: Àird Ghobhar [aːrˠʃtʲ ˈɣo.əɾ]; meaning high place of goats) is an area of the Scottish Highlands on the western shore of Loch Linnhe. It lies north of the district of Morvern and east of the district of Sunart. Administratively it is now part of the ward management area of Lochaber, in Highland council area. It forms part of the traditional shire and current registration county of Argyll.

The modern term Ardgour, together with Kingairloch, is applied to a large area of countryside around the village, from the Glensanda Superquarry, Kingairloch and Kilmalieu in the south and west (bordering Morvern and Sunart districts), up to Conaglen, Stroncreggan, Treslaig, Camasnagaul, Achaphubuil, Blaich, Duisky, Garvan and Drumfin in the north (bordering Glenfinnan).

Ardgour was part of Kilmallie Parish, the largest in Scotland, until 1829 when a Quoad Sacra Parish (QSP) – 'Ballachulish & Corran of Ardgour' – was formed, also including Ballachulish, in Inverness-shire across Loch Linnhe. Parliamentary churches were built at Creag Mhòr in North Ballachulish and at Corran in Ardgour with the Manse at the former in Onich. 'Ardgour' and 'Ballachulish & Onich' became parishes in their own right in 1894. Ardgour took in Kingairloch when this was disjoined from Lismore and Appin Parish in 1911.

From 1930 to 1975 Ardgour formed part of the (civil) landward district of Ardnamurchan in Argyll. From 1975 it was subsumed civilly into the Lochaber District of Highland Region.

The area is served by the A861 road. The easiest access from the A82 (Glasgow – Inverness Trunk road) is via a short ferry crossing from Corran to Ardgour; the alternative is a 40-mile (60 km) trip around Loch Linnhe and Loch Eil. The ferry runs every half-hour from about 6:30 am (8:45 am on Sunday) until about 9:30 pm and costs £8.00 per PLG vehicle (wef 1 Apr 2018) for a single ticket – passengers/pedestrians free. Foot passengers and bicycles are carried free of charge.

Ardgour has formed part of the territory of the Clan MacLean ever since the MacMasters were removed from the territory in the 15th century. The current Laird of Ardgour, Robin Maclean, is a MacLean by adoption. He is the nephew of the last hereditary Maclean of Ardgour – a lady Laird – having changed his name by legal action in The Court of the Lord Lyon in Edinburgh.

== Lairds ==
At the instigation of MacDonald of the Isles, the MacMasters were usurped by Donald Maclean 1st of Ardgour in circa 1432. A Maclean of Ardgour has been Laird till the current time, Robin Maclean, 18th Laird of Ardgour succeeding his aunt, Catriona Louise Maclean, 17th Laird in 1988.

== See also ==
- Maclean of Ardgour
- Corran Ferry
- Crofting
