= HHZ =

HHZ may refer to:

- Hectohertz (hHz)
- Hikueru Airport, in French Polynesia
- Port HHZ, a Royal Navy shore establishment in Scotland during the Second World War
- Headhunterz, a Dutch Hardstyle DJ
