= Dalnabreck =

Coordinates: 56.76252°N 5.76167°W

Dalnabreck: Scottish Gaelic: Dail nam Breac
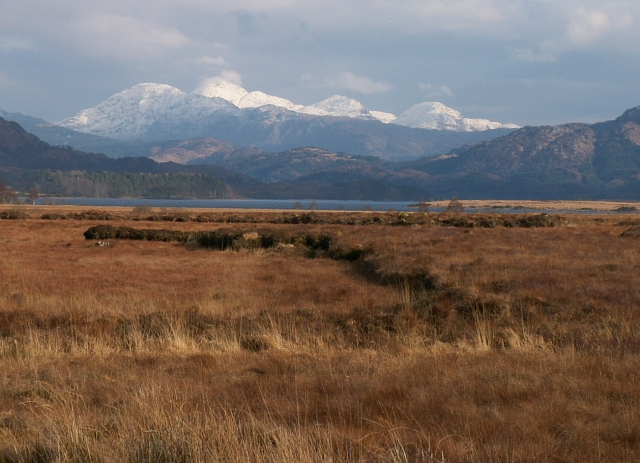
- Peat banks between Mingarry and Dalnabreck, looking west.

- Location within the Lochaber area
- OS grid reference: NM701697
- Council area: Highland
- Country: Scotland
- Sovereign state: United Kingdom
- Post town: Acharacle
- Postcode district: PH36 4
- Police: Scotland
- Fire: Scottish
- Ambulance: Scottish

Dalnabreck (Scottish Gaelic: Dail nam Breac) is a small village, lying at the southwest end of Loch Shiel in Sunart, Lochaber, Scottish Highlands and is in the Scottish council area of Highland.

The A861 road runs through Dalnabreck, with Acharacle two miles (three kilometres) east and Ardmolich one mile (1.5 kilometres) northeast, connected by the A861 road.
