= HMS Sceptre (P215) =

UK submarine

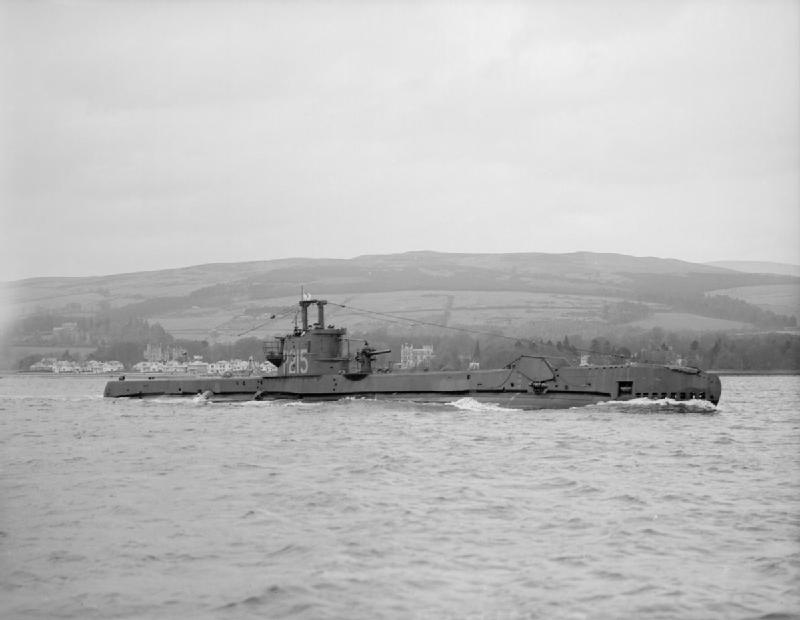
- Sceptre underway soon after completion

History

United Kingdom
- Name: Sceptre
- Ordered: 23 January 1940
- Builder: Scotts Shipbuilding and Engineering Company, Greenock
- Laid down: 25 July 1940
- Launched: 6 January 1943
- Commissioned: 15 April 1943
- Decommissioned: February 1947
- Identification: Pennant number: P215
- Fate: Sold for scrap, September 1949
- Badge

General characteristics
- Class & type: S-class submarine
- Displacement: 842 long tons (856 t) (surfaced); 990 long tons (1,010 t) (submerged)
- Length: 217 ft (66.1 m)
- Beam: 23 ft 9 in (7.2 m)
- Draught: 14 ft 8 in (4.5 m)
- Installed power: 1,900 bhp (1,400 kW) (diesel); 1,300 hp (970 kW) (electric)
- Propulsion: 2 × diesel engines; 2 × electric motors
- Speed: 15 kn (28 km/h; 17 mph) (surfaced); 10 kn (19 km/h; 12 mph) (submerged)
- Range: 6,000 nmi (11,000 km; 6,900 mi) at 10 knots (19 km/h; 12 mph) (surfaced); 120 nmi (220 km; 140 mi) at 3 knots (5.6 km/h; 3.5 mph) (submerged)
- Test depth: 300 ft (91.4 m)
- Complement: 48
- Sensors & processing systems: Type 129AR or 138 ASDIC; Type 291 early-warning radar
- Armament: 7 × 21 in (533 mm) torpedo tubes (6 × bow, 1 × stern); 1 × 3 in (76 mm) deck gun; 1 × 20 mm (0.8 in) AA gun

HMS Sceptre (P215) was a third-batch S-class submarine built for the Royal Navy during World War II. Completed in April 1943, she spent the majority of her career in the North Sea, off Norway. After an uneventful patrol, the submarine participated in Operation Source, an attack on German battleships in Norway using small midget submarines to penetrate their anchorages and place explosive charges. However, the midget submarine that she was assigned to tow experienced technical difficulties and the mission was aborted. During her next four patrols, Sceptre attacked several ships, but only succeeded in severely damaging one. She was then ordered to tow the submarine X24, which was to attack a floating dry dock in Bergen. The operation, codenamed Guidance, encountered difficulties with the attacking submarine's charts, and the explosives were laid on a merchant ship close to the dock instead. The dock was damaged and the ship sunk, and X24 was towed back to England. Sceptre then conducted a patrol in the Bay of Biscay, sinking two German merchant ships, before being reassigned to tow X24 to Bergen again. The operation was a success, and the dry dock was sunk.

After a last patrol in which she sank one ship, Sceptre underwent a lengthy refit to serve as a high-speed target submarine for training purposes. When the war ended, the submarine continued training operations, and was sold for scrap in September 1949.

== Design and description ==
The S-class submarines were designed to patrol the restricted waters of the North Sea and the Mediterranean Sea. The third batch was slightly enlarged and improved over the preceding second batch of the S class. The submarines had a length of 217 feet (66.1 m) overall, a beam of 23 feet 9 inches (7.2 m) and a draught of 14 feet 8 inches (4.5 m). They displaced 865 long tons (879 t) on the surface and 990 long tons (1,010 t) submerged. The S-class submarines had a crew of 48 officers and ratings. They had a diving depth of 300 feet (91.4 m).

For surface running, the boats were powered by two 950-brake-horsepower (708 kW) diesel engines, each driving one propeller shaft. When submerged each propeller was driven by a 650-horsepower (485 kW) electric motor. They could reach 15 knots (28 km/h; 17 mph) on the surface and 10 knots (19 km/h; 12 mph) underwater. On the surface, the third batch boats had a range of 6,000 nautical miles (11,000 km; 6,900 mi) at 10 knots (19 km/h; 12 mph) and 120 nmi (220 km; 140 mi) at 3 knots (5.6 km/h; 3.5 mph) submerged.

The boats were armed with seven 21-inch (533 mm) torpedo tubes. A half-dozen of these were in the bow and there was one external tube in the stern. They carried six reload torpedoes for the bow tubes for a grand total of thirteen torpedoes. Twelve mines could be carried in lieu of the internally stowed torpedoes. They were also armed with a 3-inch (76 mm) deck gun. The third-batch S-class boats were fitted with either a Type 129AR or 138 ASDIC system and a Type 291 or 291W early-warning radar.

== Construction and career ==
HMS Sceptre was a third-batch S-class submarine and was ordered by the British Admiralty on 23 January 1940. She was laid down in the Scotts Shipbuilding and Engineering Company shipyard in Greenock on 25 July 1940 and was launched on 6 January 1943. On 15 April 1943, Sceptre, under the command of Lieutenant Ian McIntosh, sailed to Holy Loch, where she was commissioned later in the day. The submarine was named after the symbol of Royal authority, the Sceptre; she was the fourth ship with this name.

After going through training exercises off Scapa Flow and Holy Loch, Sceptre set sail on 20 July 1943 for an anti-submarine patrol off Norway. The patrol was uneventful, and the boat returned to port on 5 August.

=== Operation Source ===
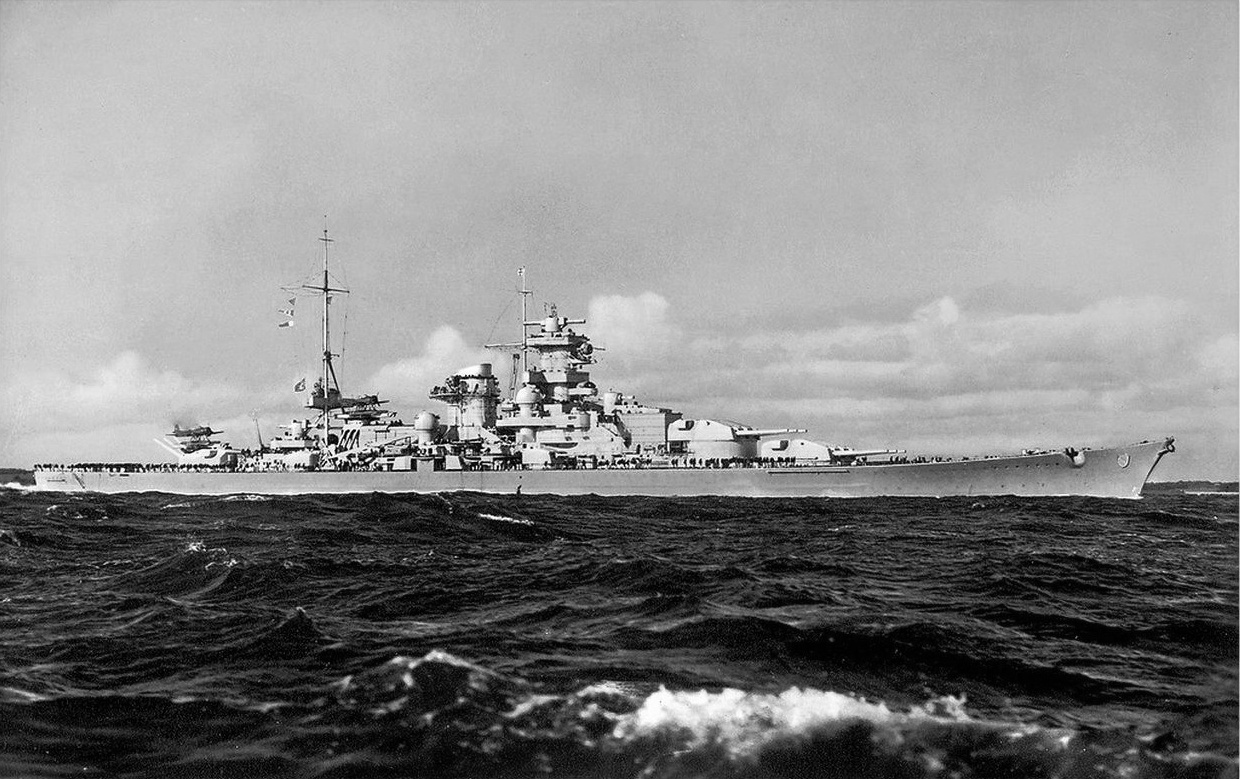
Scharnhorst at sea

On 1 September 1943, Sceptre conducted training at Port HHZ, Scotland with X-class midget submarines in preparation for Operation Source, an attack on the German battleships in Norway using midget submarines. On 12 September 1943, the boat departed port towing the X-class submarine X10 to her target, the German battleship Scharnhorst. An auxiliary crew was on board during the passage, which was meant to switch with the operational crew near the target. On 20 September, the midget submarine was released to attack the battleship Tirpitz, but experienced engine troubles and had to abandon the mission. Sceptre returned to Lerwick on 8 October, but X10 had been forced to scuttle due to mechanical problems on 3 October.

=== Northern patrols ===
Sceptre conducted another uneventful patrol in Arctic waters from 15 November to 7 December, then, in her next patrol, fired four torpedoes at the Norwegian merchantman Nina, but missed. The submarine then commenced another patrol in northern waters beginning on 26 January 1944. After six days at sea, Sceptre attacked a convoy of merchant ships with four torpedoes, but it is unclear if she hit any. Two day later, the submarine attacked what appeared to be a German U-boat, but did not claim any hits; no German submarines were in the vicinity at the time, so she may have mistaken another surface ship for an U-boat. Sceptre then ended her patrol in Scotland on 9 February.

The submarine set to sea again on 28 February, again patrolling in the Arctic. On 6 March, the boat fired two torpedoes at a merchant ship in a convoy, but missed. The next day, Sceptre again sighted a convoy, and succeed in inflicting heavy torpedo damage on the German merchantman Lippe; Lippe was forced to beach itself and broke up the next day. On 12 and 13 March, the submarine fired torpedoes at the merchants Kong Harald and Gordias, but failed on both occasions to score a hit. Sceptre returned to port on 16 March.

From 25 March to 9 April, Sceptre again participated in training operations with X-class submarines, after which she departed for a special operation, Operation Guidance. This operation was similar to the earlier attack on Tirpitz in that X-class midget submarines would be used to penetrate a heavily defended area and attack targets underwater with limpet mines. This mission's target was a floating dry dock in Bergen, Norway. On 11 April, Sceptre set out towards Bergen with the midget submarine X24 under tow, and released her the next day. X24 successfully entered the harbour two days later, but faulty intelligence and incorrect charts resulted in the explosive charges being laid on the German merchant Barenfels and not on the dock. The ship was sunk and the dock damaged, and X24 rendezvoused with Sceptre and both submarines left the area at full speed; only later was X24 taken under tow again. The pair returned to Port HZZ on 18 April.

On 6 May 1944, Sceptre departed harbour for a patrol in the Bay of Biscay area, off northern Spain. Two weeks later, the submarine torpedoed and sank the German merchant ship Hochheimer off Bilbao, Spain. Sceptre followed up with this success by sinking the merchant Baldur off Punta Lamie, Spain, three day later. The submarine ended her patrol in Gibraltar on 2 June. Sceptre returned to England between 20 June, and 1 July.

After training for operations with X-class midget submarines at Port HZZ, the boat departed on 7 September, towing X24 to her target, the same floating dry dock in Bergen. Sceptre released X24 in the evening of 10 September; X24 penetrated the harbour in broad daylight, avoiding tugs and ships, and successfully placed her explosive charges under the targeted dock. The midget submarine met Sceptre later in the day, and both submarines returned to their base unharmed, while the charges under the dock exploded, breaking it in two and sinking it.

The boat set out for another patrol in northern waters on 14 September; six days later, she attacked a coaster with three torpedoes, which all exploded on the beach after missing their target; later in the day Sceptre attacked the Norwegian merchant Vela and sank it with a full salvo of six torpedoes. The submarine ended her patrol on 23 September. Sceptre then conducted another patrol from 15 to 28 October, sinking the German submarine chaser UJ 1111.

=== Refit as target submarine ===
On 22 November, Sceptre arrived at Sheerness where she was extensively refitted and modified for use as a target submarine. Her deck gun was removed and her hull streamlined, and she was fitted with more powerful batteries. She was allocated to the Seventh Submarine Flotilla and used for training, based at Sheerness. She continued to run as a training unit based in Portland until February 1947. After sustaining damage due to a battery explosion on 8 August 1949, she was sold to BISCO for scrap in September 1949.

== Summary of raiding history ==
During her service with the Royal Navy, Sceptre sank five ships for a total of 15,084 gross register tons (GRT).

Date	Name of ship	Tonnage	Nationality	Fate and location
7 March 1944	Lippe	7,849	Germany	Severely damaged with torpedoes at 64°32′N 10°38′E, beached and broke up the following day
20 May 1944	Hochheimer	1,894	Germany	Torpedoed and sunk at 43°31′N 02°52′W
23 May 1944	Baldur	3,630	Germany	Torpedoed and sunk at 43°21.30′N 03°10.30′W
20 September 1944	Vela	1,184	Norway	Torpedoed and sunk at 58°19′N 05°35′E
21 October 1944	UJ 1111	527	Germany	Torpedoed and sunk at 58°34′N 05°28.5′E
