= Maclean of Ardgour =

The Macleans of Ardgour are a Scottish family and a branch of the ancient Clan Maclean, a Scottish clan of the Scottish Highlands. In Scottish Gaelic they are known as Mac Mhic Eoghainn, which means the son of the son of Owen.

== MacLean of Ardgour ==
The chiefs of the Clan Maclean are the Macleans of Duart Castle. The second branch of the Duart family, that of Ardgour, is descended from Lachlan Bronneach Maclean, the 7th Chief of Clan Maclean, by a daughter of Mac Eachann (Maclean) of Kingerloch. Having been born out of wedlock, Ewen Maclean, 1st Laird of Ardgour. was, in consequence, brought up among his mother's people.

When of age to bear arms, he was taken by his grandfather to the Castle of Ardtornish in Morvern, where MacDonald of the Isles then resided, and asked MacDonald to give him some living, as he was a promising youth.

MacMaster, Laird of Ardgour had upset MacDonald, and he took the opportunity to gain revenge by suggesting MacEarchorn and his grandson should leap the dyke where it was lowest. They took the hint, went to Ardgour, attacked MacMaster, took him and his son(s) and killed them.

The Chief's eldest son had escaped and fled to Corran Ferry hoping to be taken across to the other side. However, MacGurraclaich, the ferryman, was out fishing and responded to the call to come ashore with "The 'cuddies' are taking too well to-night"). The pursuing Macleans soon caught and killed him.

MacLean then killed the ferryman for his duplicity and disloyalty and hung him using his oars as a scaffold.

The Macleans took immediate possession of Ardgour, which MacDonald confirmed by granting Ewen a Charter, later ratified by the King.

He had three sons: Ewen Maclean, 2nd Laird of Ardgour; Niall Ban Maclean, progenitor of the MacLeans of Borreray; and John Ruadh Maclean, who served as tutor during the minority of John MacAllen, grandson to his brother Ewen. Ewen also had a son out of wedlock, named Gillespig, or Archibald, from whom is descended the people called Clan Ewenraoch. Ewen died before 1463, and was succeeded by his son, Ewen Maclean, 2nd Laird of Ardgour.

The patronymic of the family of Maclean of Ardgour is Mac Mhic Eoghainn, which means the son of the son of Ewen. The Ewen referred to in the patronymic as the eponymous of the family was killed at the Battle of Bloody Bay about 1482, displaying his armorial bearings upon his galley and is the direct ancestor of the present Laird.

== The Maclean Lairds of Ardgour ==
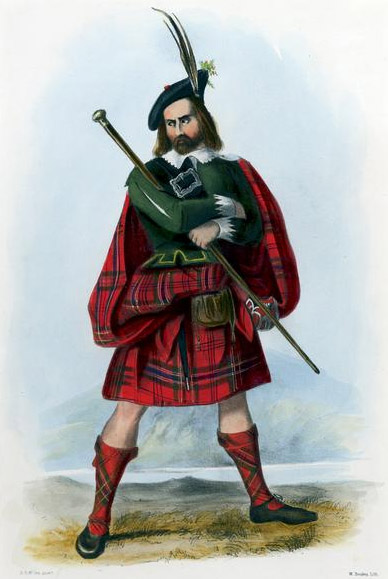
"Mac Lean" illustration by R. R. McIan, from James Logan's The Clans of the Scottish Highlands, 1845.

- Ewen Maclean, 1st Laird of Ardgour, 'The Hunter' born circa 1411 died before 1463. Son of Lachlan 'Bronnach' MacLean (7th Duart) [Bronnach = Pot Bellied]
- Ewen Maclean, 2nd Laird of Ardgour, killed circa 1482 at the Battle of Bloody Bay Married a daughter of Thomas Chisholm of Strathglass, Inverness-shire
- Lauchlan Maclean, 3rd Laird of Ardgour. He did not marry and succession passed to his brother Charles' son John.
- John, Maclean, 4th of Ardgour, was the son of Charles, himself the son of Ewen, 2nd of Ardgour. He Married a daughter of Ewen McAllan Cameron (13th Locheil) – John was pardoned for acts of piracy at Solway by King James V, 1542, and had his lands erected into a new Barony of Ardgour by Crown Charter the same year; one of 17 Barons in the Council of the Isles, 1545, dsp and was succeeded by his cousin once removed
- Allan Maclean, 5th Laird of Ardgour, born circa 1520, was the son of John the son of Allan, himself the son of Ewen, 2nd of Ardgour. Died 1592. Married a daughter of Ewen 'Beag' Cameron (14th Locheil)
- Ewen Maclean 'Eoghain na hilaig' 6th Laird of Ardgour, killed at Mamore circa 1592 in mistake for Cameron of Locheil. Married a daughter of Stewart of Appin.
- Allan Maclean, 7th Laird of Ardgour, born circa 1582 and died about 1681. Married Catherine Cameron daughter of Alan Cameron. Two of his sons were killed at the Battle of Inverkeithing, 20 July 1651,
- John 'Crùbach' Maclean, 8th Laird of Ardgour, born circa 1603 and died 1695 [Crùbach = Cripple] Married Mary MacLaine daughter of Lachlan 'Mor' MacLaine (11th Lochbuie) 4 Jan 1665.
- Ewen Maclean, 9th Laird of Ardgour, born circa 1639 and died 1694.
- Allan Maclean, 10th Laird of Ardgour, born 1668 and died 10 Nov 1756. Married Ann Cameron daughter of Sir Ewen 'Dubh' Cameron (17th Locheil)
- John Maclean, 11th Laird of Ardgour), born 1700 and died 2 Mar 1739 Island of Mull, Argyll. Married Marjorie MacLachlan 25 Dec 1735.
- Hugh MacLean, 12th Laird of Ardgour, born 1736 and died 4 Sep 1768 – Built Ardgour House in 1765; a captain in the 1st Regiment of Argyle Fencibles
- Alexander Maclean, 13th Laird of Ardgour, born 16 Apr 1764 and died 8 Sep 1855 – Receiver General of Landrents, Paymaster of the Civil Establishment and Receiver General of the land tax, and assessed taxes in Scotland. Colonel of Argyllshire Militia
- Alexander Maclean, 14th Laird of Ardgour, born 11 Feb 1799 baptised 1 Mar 1799 and died 28 Nov 1872 – Collector of the Jaghire for East India Company.
- Alexander Thomas Maclean, 15th Laird of Ardgour, born 1 Apr 1835, Madras, India, and died 14 Dec 1890 – Judge at the High Court of Judiciary at Fort William, Bengal.
- Alexander John Hew Maclean, 16th Laird of Ardgour, born 1 Dec 1880 and died 27 May 1930 – J.P. for Argyllshire, and Major 1st Argyll and Sutherland Highlanders.
- Catriona Louisa Maclean, 17th Laird of Ardgour, born 27 Aug 1919 and died 16 Mar 1988
- Robin Maclean, (Born Robin Michael Torrie) 18th Laird of Ardgour, born 12 Oct 1952 was the son of Elizabeth Muriel Phillipa Maclean, youngest daughter of Alexander, 16th of Ardgour, and the Rev Adam Ronald Rentoul Torrie.

== Branches of Maclean of Ardgour ==
- Maclean of Borreray – Donald second son to the first Laird of Ardgour got the Lands of Borrera and others from Huistor Bane MacDonald, first Laird of Slate
- Maclean of Treshnish – Donald (Dubh)John Maclean, 1st of Treshnish, was a son of Ewen, 2nd of Ardgour
- Maclean of Inverscaddle – Charles, Tutor to his nephew, Allan, 7th of Ardgour, 1592–1602, had himself served heir to Ardgour but his attempt to usurp his nephew was thwarted and to keep the peace he was granted lands at Inverscaddle, in the Barony of Ardgour, 1604, ancestor of the Macleans of Inverscaddle.
- Maclean of Blaich – Hector, 1st of Blaich & Achnadale, was a son of Ewen, 2nd of Ardgour

== Ardgour House ==
Seat of the Macleans of Ardgour, this Georgian mansion was built in 1765. It is currently let as self-catering accommodation.

A house has been established at Coull (as the site was called until the 18th century) since 1542. The present house was built in 1765 by Hugh Maclean, 12th Laird of Ardgour, and reconstructed in 1825 after extensive fire damage by Hugh's son, Alexander. The original stairwell, and possibly the stairs, survived, the remainder of the interior of the mansion dates from 1825, as does the cusped decorative cast-iron staircase balustrade with polished wooden handrail. It was then that the side wings were added, slightly set back, and extending to the rear to form a shallow U-plan court, now largely infilled. The square-fronted block has dressings of honey-coloured stone from Renfrewshire (where Hugh Maclean owned Williamswood).

== Coat of arms ==
On 20 July 1909, arms were matriculated in name of Alexander John Hew Maclean 16th Laird of Ardgour as follows :-Quarterly, first, Argent, a lion rampant, Gules, armed and langued Azure; second, Azure, a castle triple-towered Argent, masoned Sable, windows portcullis and flags Gules; third, Or, a dexter hand couped fesswise Gules holding a cross crosslet fitchée Azure; fourth, Or, a galley, sails furled, oars in saltire Sable, flagged Gules, in a sea in base Vert a salmon Argent. Above the shield is placed a helmet befitting his degree with a Mantling Gules doubled Argent, and on a Wreath of his Liveries is set for Crest a branch of laurel and cypress in saltire surmounted of a battle-axe in pale, all proper and in an Escrol over the same the motto " Altera Merces ".
