= Trislaig =

Coordinates: 56.82258°N 5.12701°W

Trislaig: Scottish Gaelic: Trìoslaig
- Location within the Lochaber area
- OS grid reference: NN092744
- Council area: Highland
- Country: Scotland
- Sovereign state: United Kingdom
- Post town: Trislaig
- Postcode district: PH33 7
- Police: Scotland
- Fire: Scottish
- Ambulance: Scottish

Trislaig (Scottish Gaelic: Trìoslaig) is a small coastal hamlet on the north eastern shores of Loch Linnhe, and is situated directly across from Fort William in Lochaber, Scottish Highlands and is in the council area of Highland.

The hamlet of Stronchreggan is 1 mile southwest along the coastal road.
