= Kylestrome =

Coordinates: 58.25489°N 5.02542°W

Kylestrome: Scottish Gaelic: Caol Sròim
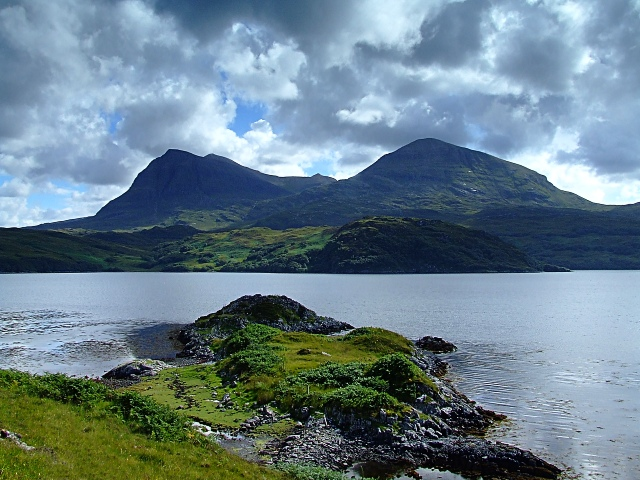
- The broch at Kylestrome

- Location within the Sutherland area
- OS grid reference: NC225335
- Council area: Highland
- Lieutenancy area: Sutherland
- Country: Scotland
- Sovereign state: United Kingdom
- Postcode district: IV27 4
- Police: Scotland
- Fire: Scottish
- Ambulance: Scottish

Kylestrome (Scottish Gaelic: Caol Sròim) is a village on the north shore of Loch a' Chàirn Bhàin, 2 miles (3 kilometres) northwest of Unapool, in Sutherland, Scottish Highlands and is in the Scottish council area of Highland.
