= HMS Sea Nymph (P223) =

S-class Submarine of the Royal Navy

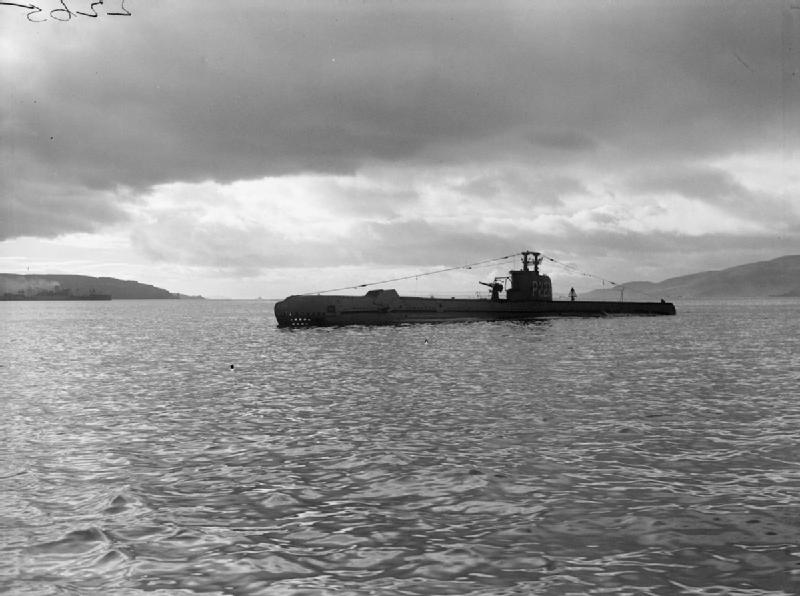
- Sea Nymph

History

United Kingdom
- Name: Sea Nymph
- Ordered: 2 September 1940
- Builder: Cammell Laird, Birkenhead
- Laid down: 6 May 1941
- Launched: 29 July 1942
- Commissioned: 3 November 1942
- Fate: Broken up, 1948
- Badge

General characteristics
- Class & type: S-class submarine
- Displacement: 865 long tons (879 t) (surfaced); 990 long tons (1,010 t) (submerged)
- Length: 217 ft (66.1 m)
- Beam: 23 ft 9 in (7.2 m)
- Draught: 14 ft 8 in (4.5 m)
- Installed power: 1,900 bhp (1,417 kW) (diesel); 1,300 hp (970 kW) (electric)
- Propulsion: 2 × diesel engines; 2 × electric motors
- Speed: 15 kn (28 km/h; 17 mph) (surfaced); 10 kn (19 km/h; 12 mph) (submerged)
- Range: 6,000 nmi (11,000 km; 6,900 mi) at 10 knots (19 km/h; 12 mph) (surfaced); 120 nmi (220 km; 140 mi) at 3 knots (5.6 km/h; 3.5 mph) (submerged)
- Test depth: 300 ft (91.4 m)
- Complement: 48
- Sensors & processing systems: Type 129AR or 138 ASDIC; Type 291 early-warning radar
- Armament: 7 × 21 in (533 mm) torpedo tubes (6 × bow, 1 × stern); 1 × 3 in (76 mm) deck gun; 1 × 20 mm (0.8 in) AA gun

HMS Sea Nymph was a S-class submarine of the third batch built for the Royal Navy during World War II. Completed in July 1942, she spent the majority of her career patrolling the waters off Norway in the North Sea, then was sent to the Pacific but was forced back due to technical problems.

After three uneventful patrols in the North Sea, the boat conducted one patrol in the Bay of Biscay, attacking two surfaced German U-boats with torpedoes, but missed. The submarine then participated in Operation Source, an attempt to sink German battleships in Norway threatening allied Arctic convoys. Sea Nymph was assigned to tow the midget submarine X8 to off the fjord where the Tirpitz was anchored. While at sea, X8 was scuttled due to technical issues, and the mission was cancelled. The submarine was then tasked with transporting British agents to a fishing vessel off Norway. In her next two patrols, the boat fired torpedoes on three German merchant ships, but missed every attack. In March 1944, Sea Nymph was sent to the United States for a refit; she returned in October, then after an uneventful patrol, she had her battery changed. With Nazi Germany close to defeat, the submarine was ordered to the Pacific, where war with the Japanese was also ongoing. She had to turn back and have her battery replaced again after encountering problems; after arriving in the Philippines, on 13 July Sea Nymph caught on fire and was damaged beyond the repair capabilities of local shipyards. She was sent back to Great Britain, but as the war with Japan ended, she was not repaired but placed in reserve. Sea Nymph was scrapped in Troon, Scotland in June 1948.

== Design and description ==
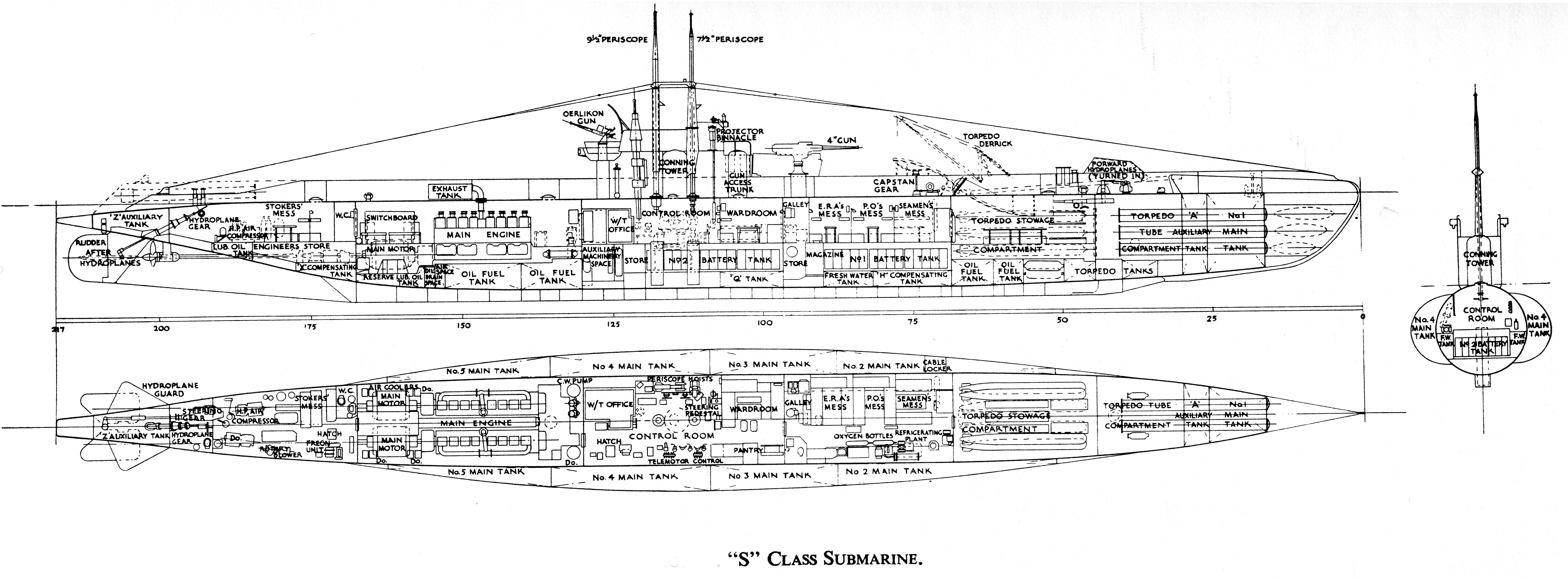
Schematic drawing of a S-class submarine

The S-class submarines were designed to patrol the restricted waters of the North Sea and the Mediterranean Sea. The third batch was slightly enlarged and improved over the preceding second batch of the S-class. The submarines had a length of 217 feet (66.1 m) overall, a beam of 23 feet 9 inches (7.2 m) and a draught of 14 feet 8 inches (4.5 m). They displaced 865 long tons (879 t) on the surface and 990 long tons (1,010 t) submerged. The S-class submarines had a crew of 48 officers and ratings. They had a diving depth of 300 feet (91.4 m).

For surface running, the boats were powered by two 950-brake-horsepower (708 kW) diesel engines, each driving one propeller shaft. When submerged each propeller was driven by a 650-horsepower (485 kW) electric motor. They could reach 15 knots (28 km/h; 17 mph) on the surface and 10 knots (19 km/h; 12 mph) underwater. On the surface, the third batch boats had a range of 6,000 nautical miles (11,000 km; 6,900 mi) at 10 knots (19 km/h; 12 mph) and 120 nautical miles (220 km; 140 mi) at 3 knots (5.6 km/h; 3.5 mph) submerged.

The boats were armed with seven 21 inch (533 mm) torpedo tubes. A half-dozen of these were in the bow and there was one external tube in the stern. They carried six reload torpedoes for the bow tubes for a grand total of thirteen torpedoes. Twelve mines could be carried in lieu of the internally stowed torpedoes. They were also armed with a 3-inch (76 mm) deck gun. It is uncertain if Sea Nymph was completed with a 20-millimetre (0.8 in) Oerlikon light AA gun or had one added later. The third-batch S-class boats were fitted with either a Type 129AR or 138 ASDIC system and a Type 291 or 291W early-warning radar.

== Construction and career ==
Sea Nymph was a third-batch S-class submarine and was ordered by the British Admiralty on 2 September 1940. She was laid down in the Cammell Laird shipyard in Birkenhead as P 73 on 6 May 1941 and was launched on 29 July 1942. On 1 November 1942, P 73, under the command of Lieutenant Geoffrey D. N. Milner, sailed to Holy Loch, where she was commissioned two days later as HMS Sea Nymph. The submarine was named after mythical sea creatures, Nereids; she was the second ship with this name.

=== Northern patrols ===
After going through training exercises off Scapa Flow and Holy Loch, Sea Nymph set sail on 16 December 1942 for an anti-submarine patrol off Norway. The patrol was uneventful, and the boat returned to port on 2 January 1943. On 15 February 1943, Sea Nymph departed Lerwick for another war patrol in the North Sea, but returned on 11 March having sighted no targets. From 20 March to 9 April, the boat conducted another patrol in the same area, but was again unsuccessful.

After torpedo and gunnery exercises of the River Clyde area, the boat commenced another patrol in the Bay of Biscay, west of France on 28 June. On 13 July, she sighted two German submarines, U-592 and U-669, and fired a full spread of six torpedoes at them, but missed. The boat returned to port of 22 July. From 3 to 20 August, Sea Nymph conducted another uneventful war patrol in the Bay of Biscay.

=== Operation Source ===
Tirpitz in the Ofotfjord/Bogenfjord

On 31 August 1943, Sea Nymph conducted training at Port HHZ, Scotland with X-class midget submarines in preparation for Operation Source, an attack on the German battleships in Norway using midget submarines. On 11 September 1943, the boat departed port towing the X-class submarine X8 to her target, the Tirpitz. An auxiliary crew was on board during the passage, which was meant to switch with the operational crew near the target. On 15 September, Sea Nymph lost her tow with X8. After one day of searching, X8 was found and taken under tow again. Two days later however, the midget submarine was found to be incapable of submerging due to technical issues and was scuttled. Sea Nymph returned to Lerwick on 8 October.

=== Arctic patrols ===
After an uneventful patrol in the Arctic from 15 November to 7 December 1943, Sea Nymph was ordered to transport British agents and equipment from Shetland to off Norway, where they would be transferred to a local fishing vessel. She landed the agents successfully on 7 January 1944, then returned to port on the 10th. On the 16th, she departed again for another war patrol off Norway. After unsuccessfully attacking a German merchant ship and its escort on the 25th, she returned to Lerwick on the 30th.

From 2 to 21 February, the boat underwent maintenance, then left for another patrol in northern waters. On 1 March, she unsuccessfully fired four torpedoes at the German merchant ship Jupiter and her two escorts. Two days later she attacked the German merchant ship Levante, but again missed with all four torpedoes. The submarine returned to Lerwick on 8 March.

=== Later career ===
On 25 March 1944, Sea Nymph departed Great Britain for the US, where she was due to refit at the Philadelphia Naval Shipyard. After a stop at Argentia, then Halifax, Nova Scotia, the boat underwent her refit between 19 April and 16 September. On 11 October, she returned to Holy Loch and underwent additional training, then the submarine went on another patrol from 6 to 17 January 1945 in the Norwegian Sea in search of German U-boats. After having her battery changed during February in Elderslie, Scotland, Sea Nymph was reassigned to the Pacific theater of operations, arriving at Gibraltar on 22 March. However, upon reaching Aden, the boat developed problems with her battery and was sent back to Port Said in Egypt for repairs. From 2 to 16 May, she had her battery replaced, then she sailed for Subic Bay, Philippines, passing through Trincomalee and arriving on 28 June.

While alongside the submarine depot ship HMS Maidstone on 13 July, Sea Nymph caught on fire. A damage assessment concluded that she had to be sent home for repairs, as local dockyards could not perform the task. After temporary repairs allowing her to get underway, she departed Subic Bay and made the trip back to Great Britain, arriving on 30 October 1945. During her return, the war with Japan had ended, and Sea Nymph was not repaired but placed in reserve. In June 1948, the boat was sold for scrap metal at Troon, Scotland.
