= Eddrachillis Bay =

Bay on the coast of Sutherland, Scotland

Coordinates: 58°18′N 5°15′W

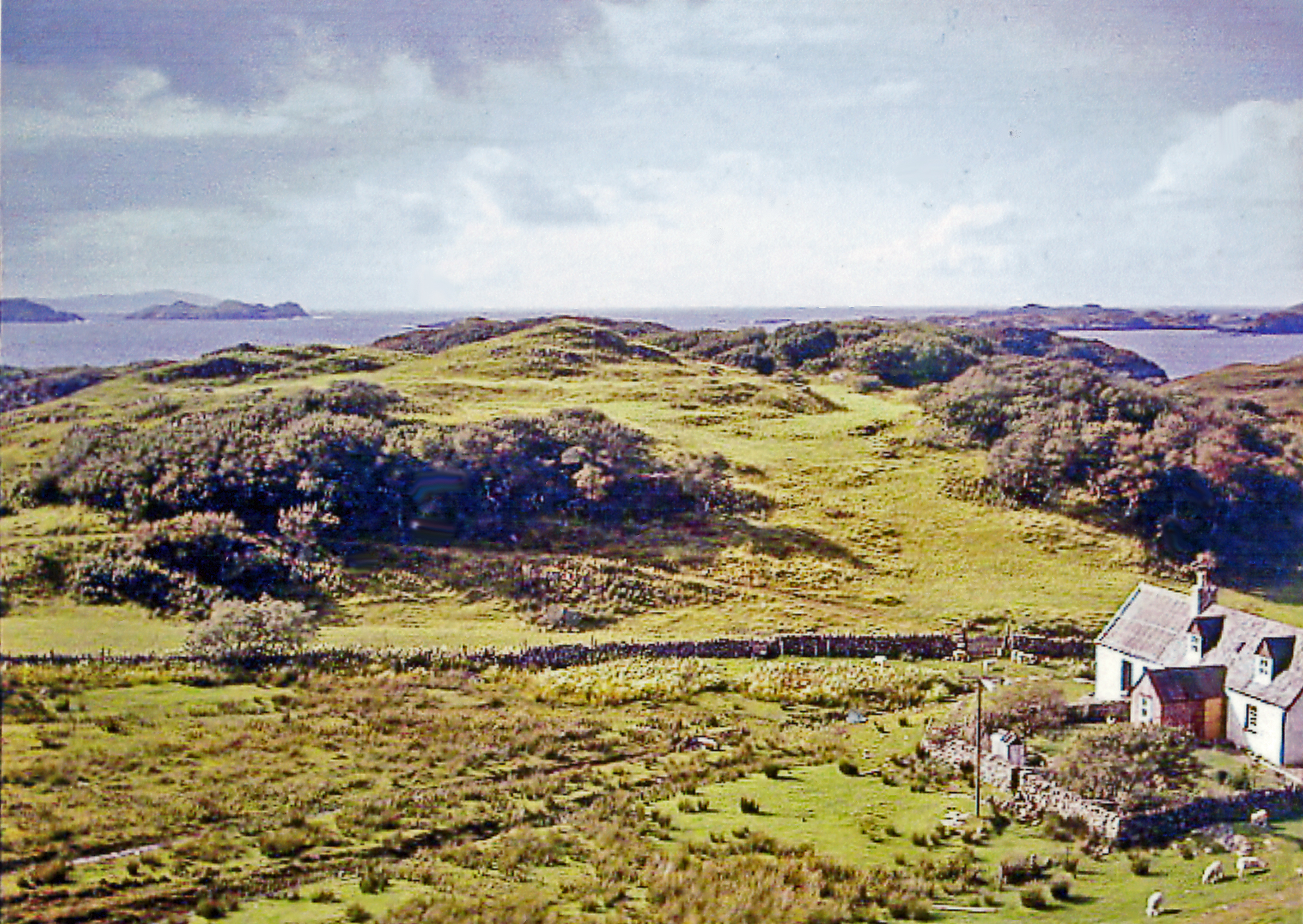
Kylestrome, Edrachillis Bay

Eddrachillis Bay (Scottish Gaelic: Eadar Dà Chaolas- "between two kyles", Kylesku and Laxford) is a bay on the north-west coast of Sutherland, Scotland. It lies north of Assynt, and is at the mouth of the Loch a' Chàirn Bhàin, also known as the Loch Cairnbawn. It is neighboured by Eddrachillis, of which namesakes are shared.

Very Rev Mackintosh MacKay (1793–1873) Moderator of the General Assembly of the Free Church of Scotland in 1849, was born here.
