= Blaich =

Coordinates: 56.84435°N 5.20045°W

Blaich: Scottish Gaelic: Blàthaich
- Location within the Lochaber area
- OS grid reference: NN049771
- Council area: Highland
- Country: Scotland
- Sovereign state: United Kingdom
- Post town: FORT WILLIAM
- Postcode district: PH33
- Police: Scotland
- Fire: Scottish
- Ambulance: Scottish

Blaich (Scottish Gaelic: Blàthaich – as a noun, "buttermilk", or as a verb, "to heat/warm up") is a small community, on the south shore of Loch Eil on the A861 road, near Fort William, in the Ardgour area, Highlands of Scotland.

== Gallery ==
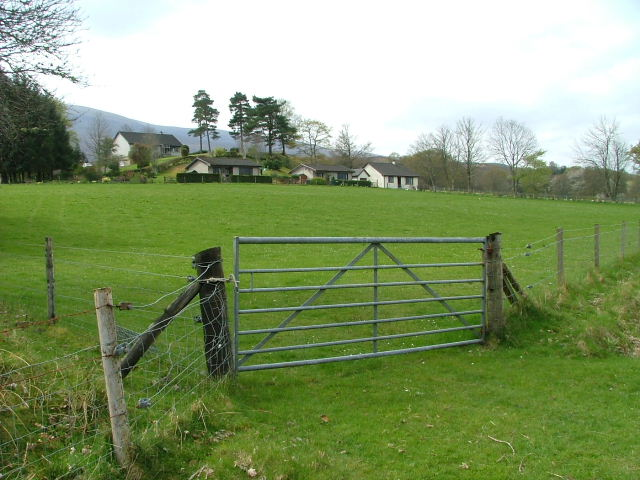
Houses in Blaich

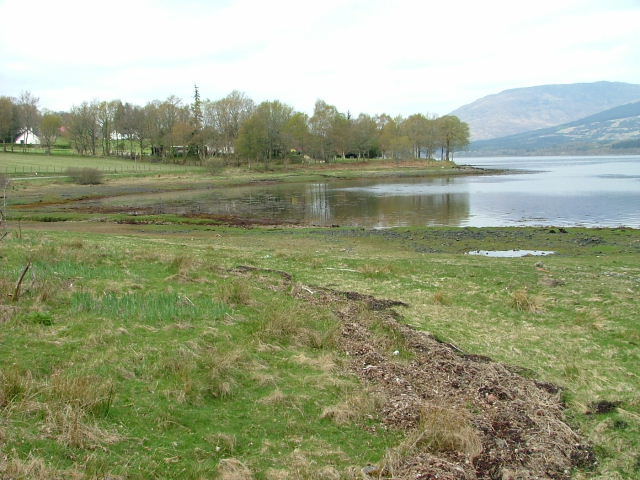
Shoreline on Loch Eil from Blaich.

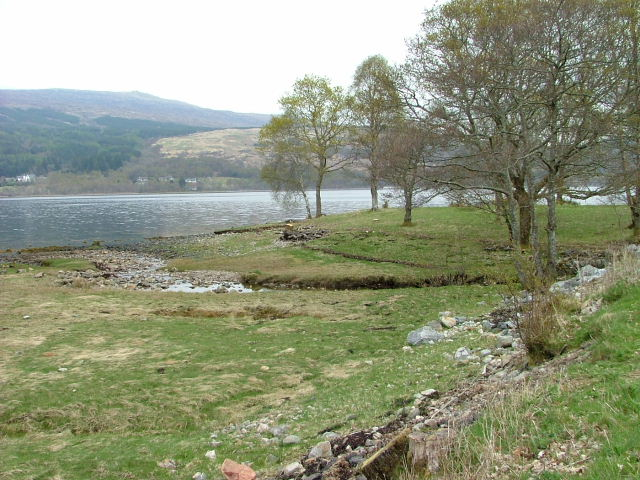
Shoreside trees in Blaich.

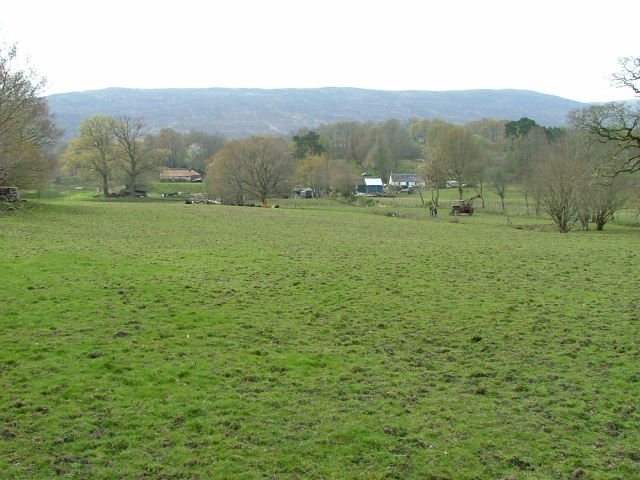
Farming in Blaich.

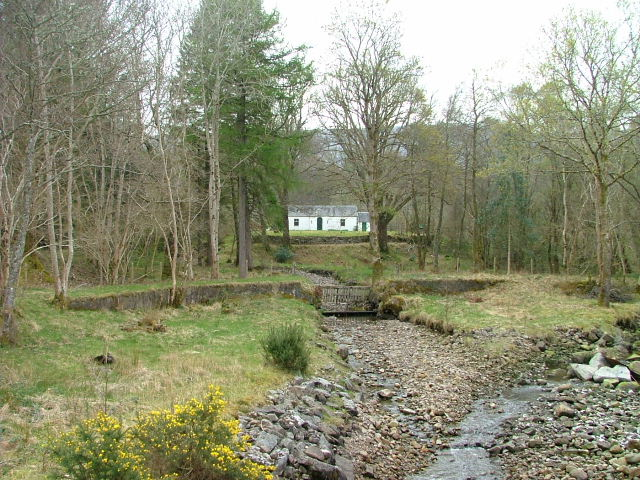
Small croft in Blaich.

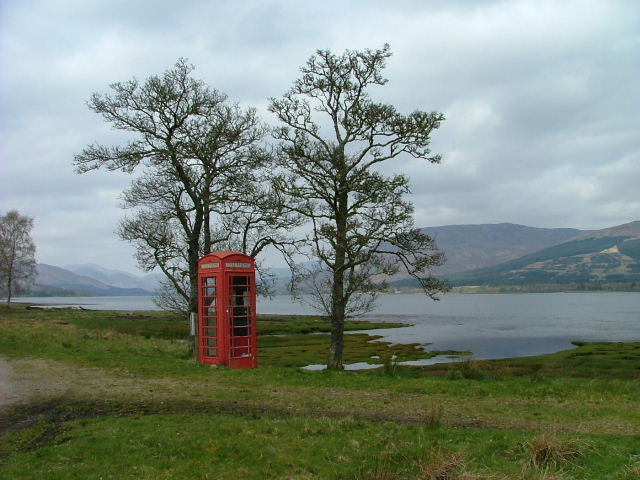
Remote telephone box in Blaich
