= Port HHZ =

Coordinates: 58.26°N 5.08°W

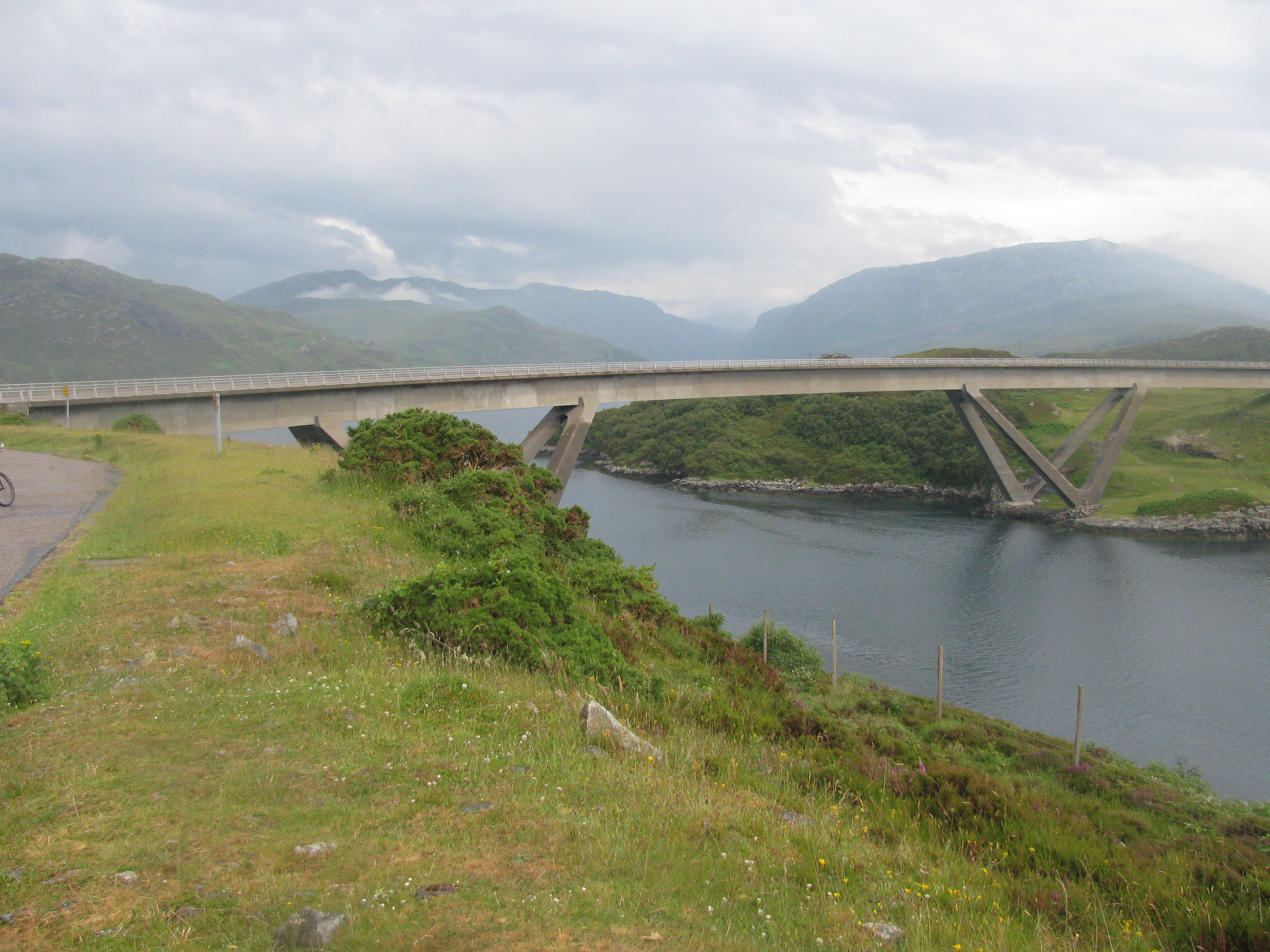
Loch Cairnbawn and Kylesku Bridge today

Port HHZ was a shore establishment of the Royal Navy during the Second World War. It was based at Loch Cairnbawn, Scotland, and was established in 1942.

The base was heavily involved in the training for the X-Craft operations (Operation Source) to sink the German battleship Tirpitz. From July 1943, the craft worked up from HMS Bonaventure at Port HHZ. Capital ships of the Home fleet acted as target ships at Port HHZ. The Boom Defence organisation were also heavily involved in surrounding these ships with nets and providing net defences and equipment for the trials.

HMS Titania sailed for and arrived at Port HHZ on 30 August 1943 to act as depot ship to the submarines taking part, and the submarines HMS Thrasher, Truculent, Stubborn, Syrtis, Sceptre and Sea Nymph arrived between 31 August and 1 September. Special security measures at Port HHZ were also increased from 1 September. No leave was allowed, and only specially selected officers and ratings were permitted to leave the area. All ships present were retained in the port until the completion of the operation.
