= Resipole =

Coordinates: 56.6947°N 5.73452°W

Resipole: Scottish Gaelic: Rèiseapol
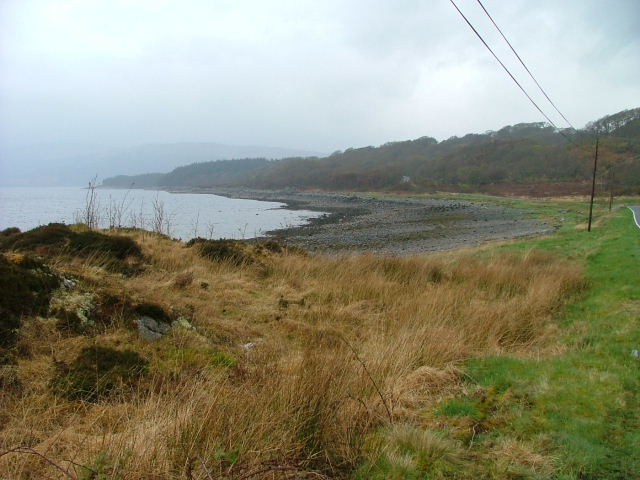
- A bay on Loch Sunart at Resipole

- Location within the Lochaber area
- OS grid reference: NM714621
- Council area: Highland
- Country: Scotland
- Sovereign state: United Kingdom
- Post town: ACHARACLE
- Postcode district: PH36
- Police: Scotland
- Fire: Scottish
- Ambulance: Scottish

Resipole (Scottish Gaelic: Rèiseapol) is a settlement on the Ardnamurchan peninsula in Highland, Scotland.

Resipole is located on the A861 road on the northern shore of Loch Sunart. The primary economic activities are tourism related, there being a touring caravan park there. In addition Resipole Studios provides gallery space and other facilities for artists. There are also self-catering properties available and a bed and breakfast.
