= Corran Ferry =

Ferry crossing Loch Linnhe in Scotland

Coordinates: 56°43′21″N 5°14′34.07″W

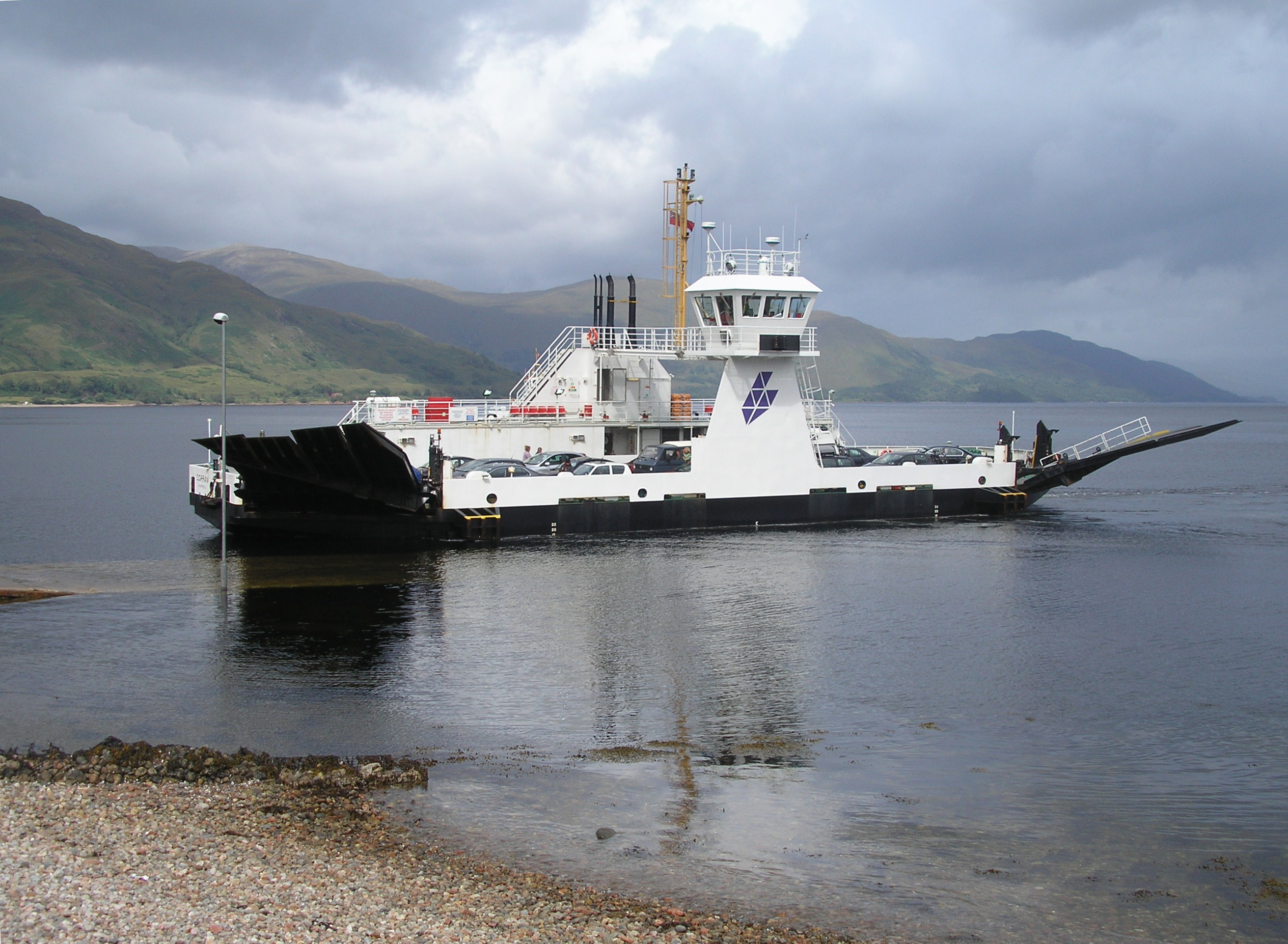
- The Corran landing at Ardgour

The Corran Ferry crosses Loch Linnhe at the Corran Narrows, south of Fort William, Scotland.

== Description ==
Operated by Highland Council, the Corran Ferry is one of few remaining scheduled mainland vehicle ferries in Scotland. The route crosses Loch Linnhe from Nether Lochaber to Ardgour, at the Corran Narrows, 9 miles (14 km) south of Fort William.

It was noted for the unusual sign "This is not the Ballachulish Ferry", placed there to avoid confusion with the nearby ferry at Ballachulish which crossed Loch Leven until being replaced by the Ballachulish Bridge in early 1976.

The route lies on one of the ancient drove routes from the Hebrides to the cattle markets in Central Scotland. Today, the ferry is a crucial link between the main A82 road (serving Inverness, Fort William, and Glasgow) with the otherwise extremely remote Morvern and Ardnamurchan peninsulas. Use of the ferry saves over an hour from the land route between Ardgour and Corran (which would involve use of the A861 and the A830).

Services are fairly frequent, with ferries operating every 20 to 30 minutes seven days a week. Most pedestrians and cyclists pay a fare of £2, with higher charges for roll-on/roll-off transport of motorised vehicles, e.g a car costs £12.00 (as of 2026).

From the Ardgour side, there are roadway connections to Lochaline, 31 miles (50 km) to the southwest, and to Kilchoan, 44 miles (71 km) to the west; both of these locations are linked by Caledonian MacBrayne ferries to points on the Isle of Mull, respectively Fishnish and Tobermory.

Close to the Ardgour side are Corran Lighthouse and the Ardgour Inn.

== Ferries ==
There has been a ferry at the site for centuries. The North Argyll, a turntable ferry, was on the route in the 1930s. Her deck rotated to allow one car to drive easily onto the slipway.

The Maid of Glencoul, launched in 1976 in Ardrossan, spent her early years operating between Kylesku and Kylestrome in the far north west of Scotland. She was displaced when the Kylesku Bridge opened in 1984. She continues as the backup ferry on the route.

The Rosehaugh was displaced from the Kessock Ferry in 1982 by the opening of the Kessock Bridge. She was retired in 2001 after 32 years in service on various routes across the Highlands.

MV Corran replaced the Rosehaugh in late 2001. She was built in Hull for £2.9 million and brought additional capacity to the crossing.
