= Kylesku Bridge =

Road bridge in Sutherland, northern Scotland

Kylesku Bridge Drochaid a' Chaolais Chumhaing (Scottish Gaelic)
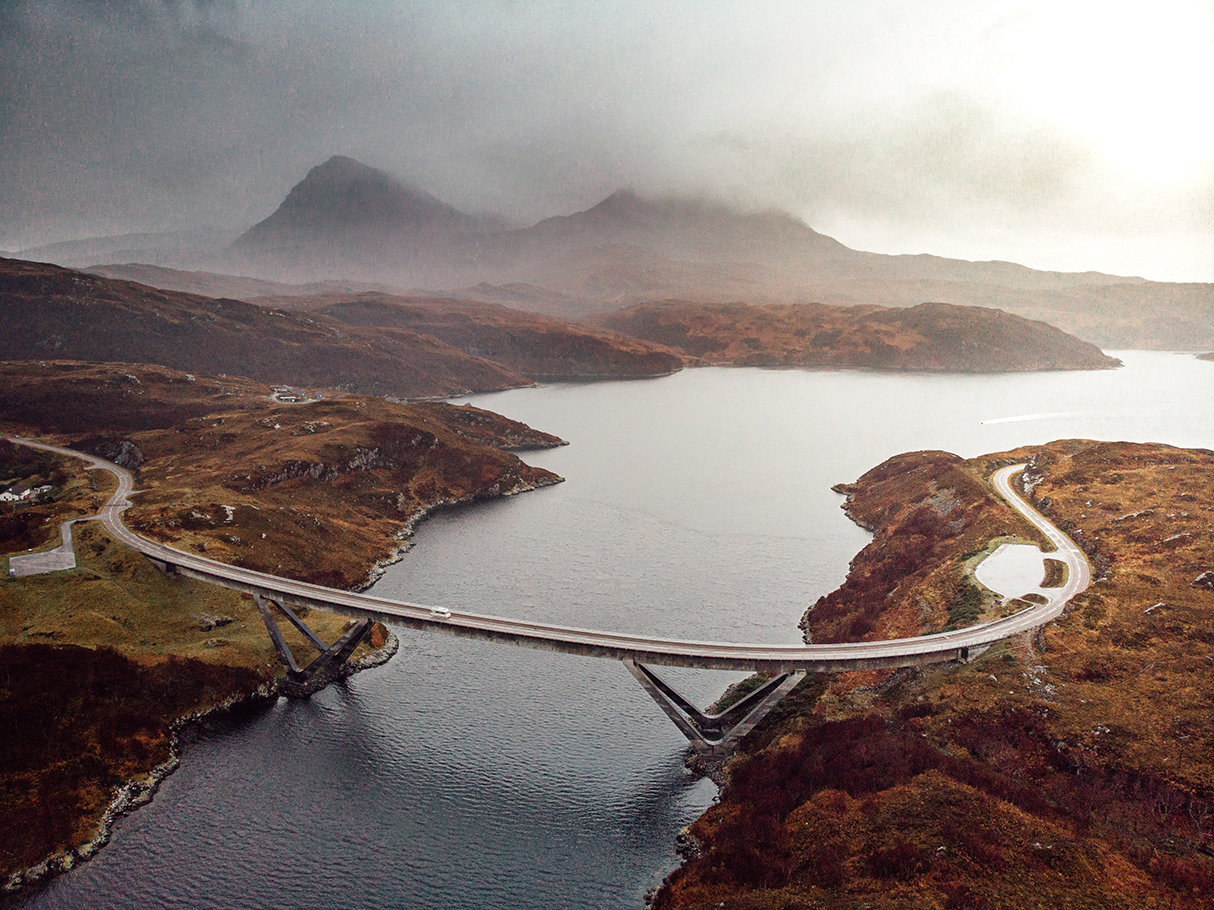
- Coordinates: 58.257318°N 5.023792°W
- Carries: A894 , one footway
- Crosses: Loch a' Chàirn Bhàin (Caolas Cumhann)
- Locale: Kylestrome

Characteristics
- Design: Prestressed box girder
- Material: Concrete
- Total length: 276 metres (906 ft)
- Height: 24 metres (79 ft)
- Longest span: 79 metres (259 ft)
- No. of spans: 5

History
- Designer: Ove Arup
- Construction start: August 1982
- Construction cost: £4 million
- Opened: July 1984
- Inaugurated: 8 August 1984
- Replaces: Kylesku and Kylestrome ferry

Listed Building – Category A
- Official name: Drochaid A’ Chaolais Chumhaing, An Caolas Cumhang / Kylesku Bridge, Kylesku
- Designated: 23 January 2019
- Reference no.: LB52497

Location
- Interactive map of Kylesku Bridge

The Kylesku Bridge (officially known since 2019 by its Gaelic name Drochaid a' Chaolais Chumhaing) is a distinctively curved concrete box girder bridge in northwest Scotland that crosses Caolas Cumhann (Gaelic for "narrow strait", pronounced "Kyles Cuan"); the channel that connects Loch Glencoul and Loch Glendhu with Loch a' Chàirn Bhàin in Sutherland. It is listed as category A, the highest grade.

== History ==
In June 1978, the Highland Regional Council asked Ove Arup & Partners Scotland to prepare a feasibility study for a bridge, in their capacity as consulting civil engineers, and it was prepared by March 1979.

Construction for the approach roads, costing £4 million, began in summer 1981. Construction of the bridge began in August 1982, with Morrison Construction and Lehane, Mackenzie and Shand the chief contractors.

It was constructed by building out the supporting legs and then lifting into place the central span, which weighed 640 tonnes (630 long tons; 710 short tons).

The cost of the bridge was £4 million, although was earlier budgeted at £2.75 million. The bridge opened to traffic in July 1984, and was formally opened by the Queen on 8 August 1984.

In 2019, the bridge was classified by Historic Environment Scotland as a Category A structure, recognising it as "visually striking and technically innovative". It was also officially renamed to the Gaelic translation of its name, Drochaid a' Chaolais Chumhaing.

== Geography ==
The bridge crosses water which is approximately 120 metres (390 ft) wide and up to 25 metres (82 ft) deep, leading to fast tidal currents. It replaced the ferry between Kylesku and Kylestrome, which was approximately 400 metres (1,300 ft) to the east.

== Design ==
The bridge is 276 metres (906 ft) long with a 79-metre-long (259 ft) main span. The bridge deck is at a height of 24 metres (79 ft) above high water to provide navigation for ships.

The bridge deck is supported by V-shaped inclined piers, with eight inclined legs, in order to reduce the length of the main span. The lateral forces from each leg balance, so the total force on the foundations is vertically downwards. The spread of legs supports the bridge in winds which can exceed 100 mph (160 km/h; 45 m/s; 85 kn), and also loads resulting from the curvature of the bridge. There is no joint between the legs and the deck of the bridge, with the expansion joints and bearings being located at the abutments to facilitate straightforward maintenance. The legs are formed from reinforced concrete and the deck from prestressed concrete using cables tensioned at up to 52,200 kN.

The bridge is designed to be sympathetic to the surrounding country, and the approaches were chosen to minimise changes to the landscape.

== Gallery ==
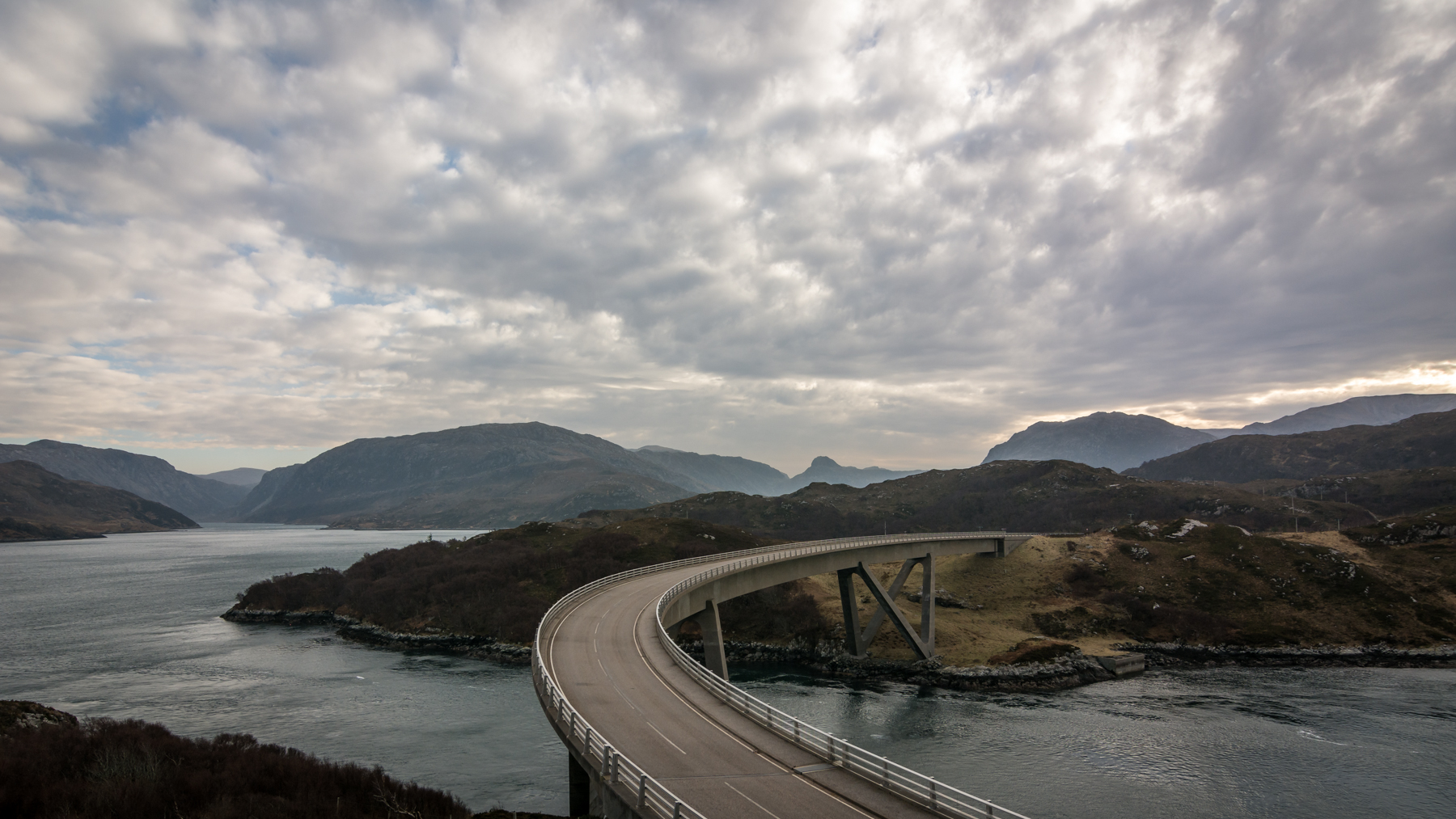
Kylesku Bridge with the Stack of Glen Coul in the distance

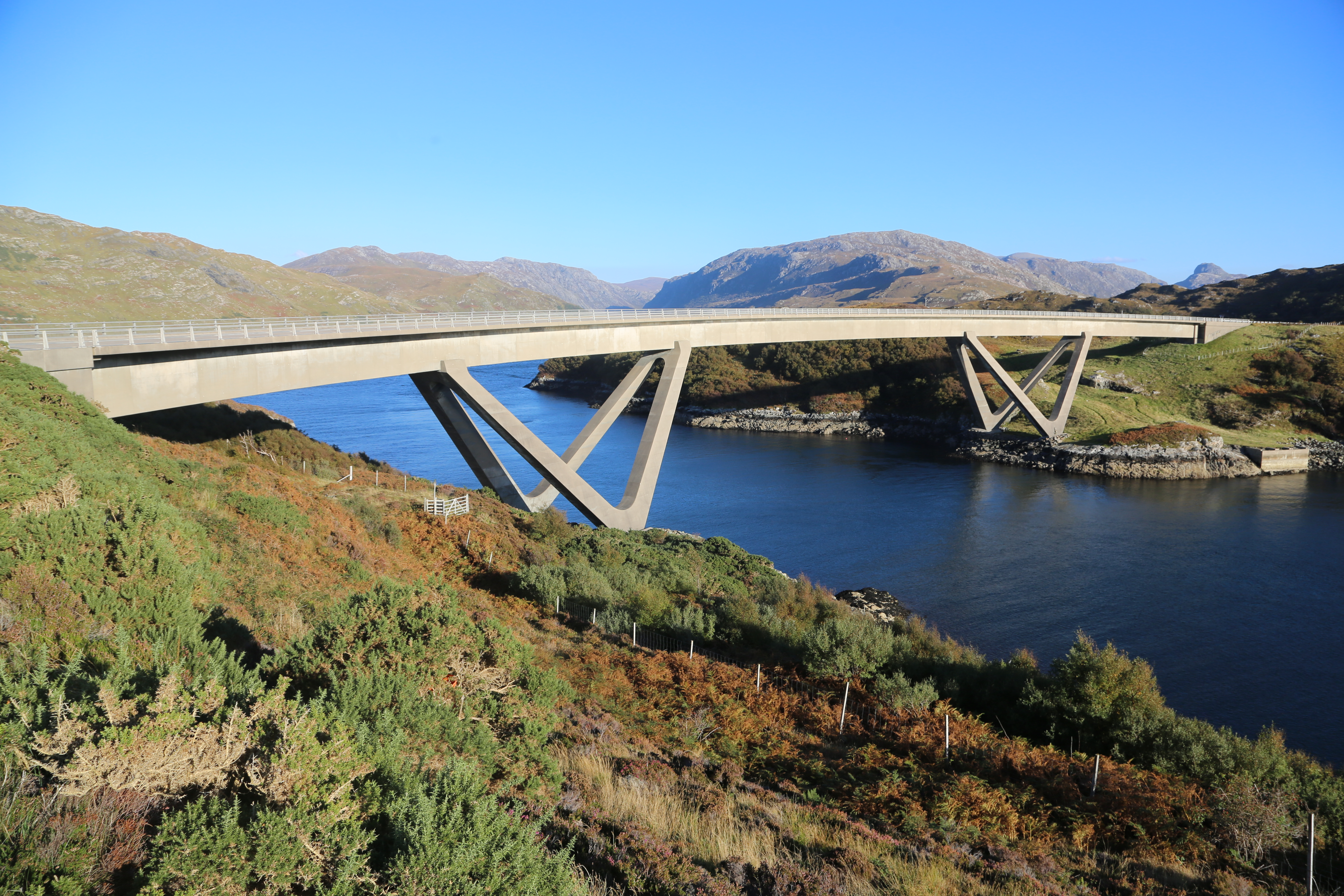
Kylesku Bridge on a sunny day in 2016

== See also ==
- List of bridges in Scotland
