= Kinlocheil =

Coordinates: 56.85305°N 5.2903°W

Kinlochiel: Scottish Gaelic: Ceann Loch Iall
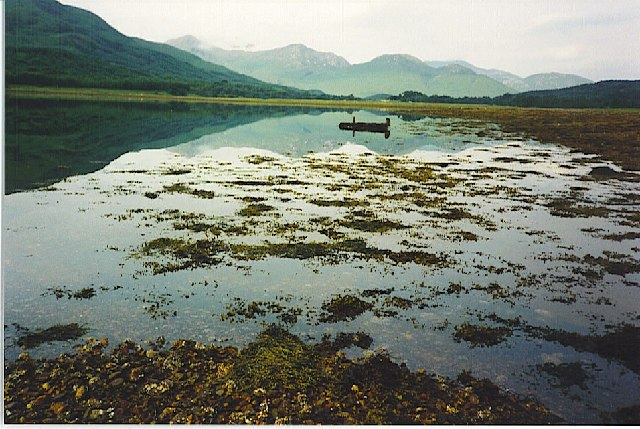
- The head of the sea loch at Kinlocheil. Grassy, shallows at the loch's head, looking west to Glenfinnan.

- Location within the Lochaber area
- OS grid reference: NM978790
- Council area: Highland
- Country: Scotland
- Sovereign state: United Kingdom
- Post town: Fort William
- Postcode district: PH33 7
- Police: Scotland
- Fire: Scottish
- Ambulance: Scottish

Kinlochiel (Scottish Gaelic: Ceann Loch Iall) is a hamlet on the north west shore of Loch Eil in Lochaber, Scottish Highlands and is in the Scottish council area of Highland. It is a small, rural area that consists of a few scattered houses on the A830 to Mallaig, after Fassfern and before Glenfinnan.
