= Operation Guidance =

Australian-British raid

Coordinates: 60°23′50″N 5°19′08″E

Operation Guidance was an Australian-British raid during World War II in 1944.

The British X-class submarine X24, entered Bergen harbour in German-occupied Norway on a mission to sink a large floating dock. After being detected and shaking off their pursuer, X24 made it to the target area, but faulty intelligence and incorrect charts led them to lay their charges not on the floating dock, but on a large German ship nearby, which was sunk in the explosion.
