= Corran, Lochaber =

Coordinates: 56.72347°N 5.24924°W

Corran: Scottish Gaelic: An Corran
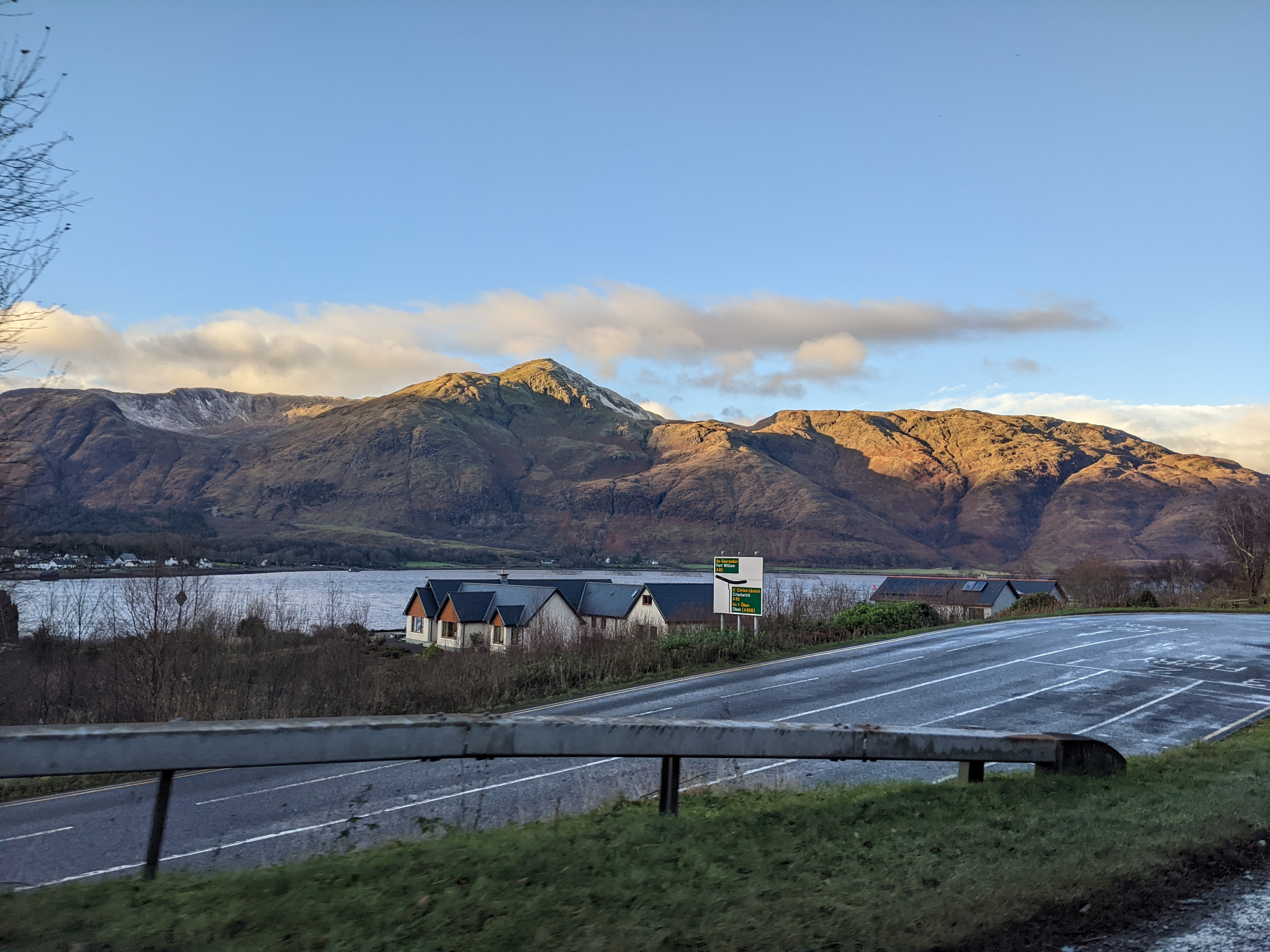
- A view of the slipway to the Corran ferry with the Ardgour hills behind.

- Location within the Lochaber area
- OS grid reference: NN012638
- Council area: Highland
- Lieutenancy area: Inverness
- Country: Scotland
- Sovereign state: United Kingdom
- Post town: Fort William
- Postcode district: PH33 7
- Police: Scotland
- Fire: Scottish
- Ambulance: Scottish
- UK Parliament: Ross, Skye and Lochaber
- Scottish Parliament: Inverness East, Nairn & Lochaber

Corran (Scottish Gaelic: An Corran) is a former fishing village, situated on Corran Point, on the west side of the Corran Narrows of Loch Linnhe, in Lochaber, Highland, Scotland. There are three small settlements set apart from the main cluster of houses: North Corran, Clovullin and Sallachan. The Highland Council Corran Ferry runs to Corran from eastern shore of the Narrows and the Corran Point Lighthouse is located there.
