= Ardmolich =

Coordinates: 56.78°N 05.75°W

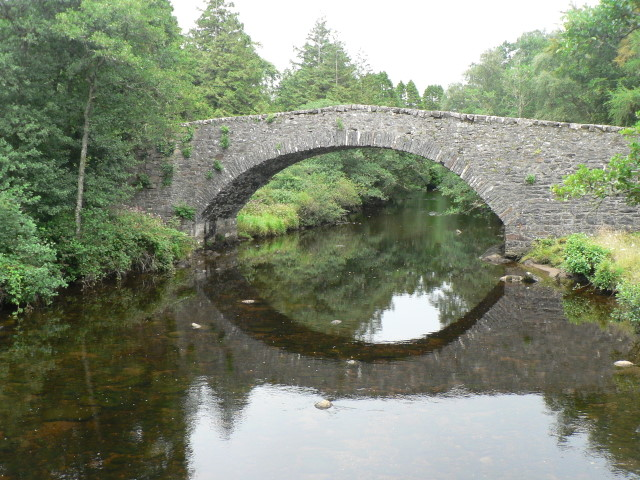
- The old Kinlochmoidart bridge across the River Moidart at Ardmolich, built in 1815

- Location within the Lochaber area
- OS grid reference: NM7172
- Council area: Highland
- Country: Scotland
- Sovereign state: United Kingdom
- Post town: LOCHAILORT
- Postcode district: PH38
- Police: Scotland
- Fire: Scottish
- Ambulance: Scottish
- UK Parliament: Ross, Skye and Lochaber
- Scottish Parliament: Skye, Lochaber and Badenoch

Ardmolich (Scottish Gaelic: An Àird Mholach) and Kinlochmoidart (Ceann Loch Mùideart) are settlements at the east head of Loch Moidart in the Moidart region, Highland, Scotland and are in the Scottish council area of Highland.

The Seven Men of Moidart, beech trees planted at the time of the Jacobite rising of 1745, are nearby. Only three now remain.

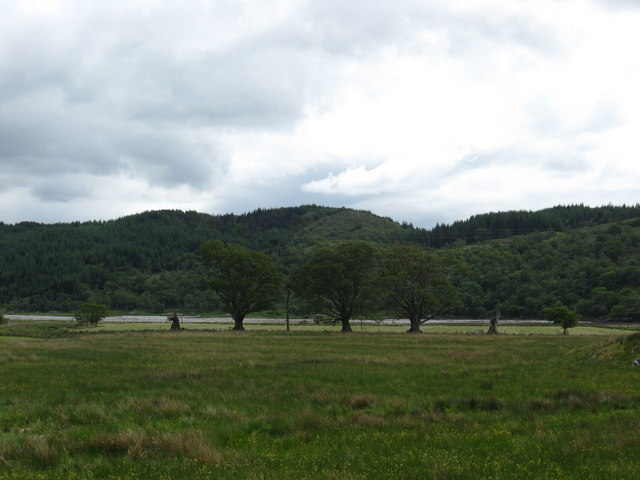
The Seven Men of Moidart Seven Beech trees were planted more than two centuries ago in honour of the seven men who accompanied Prince Charles Edward Stewart (The Bonnie Prince) in his quest to regain the British throne in the name of his father James, claimant to the throne of Great Britain. Only four of the originals remain but others have been planted to replace the dead trees.
