= Loch a' Chàirn Bhàin =

Coordinates: 58°15′22″N 5°4′14″W

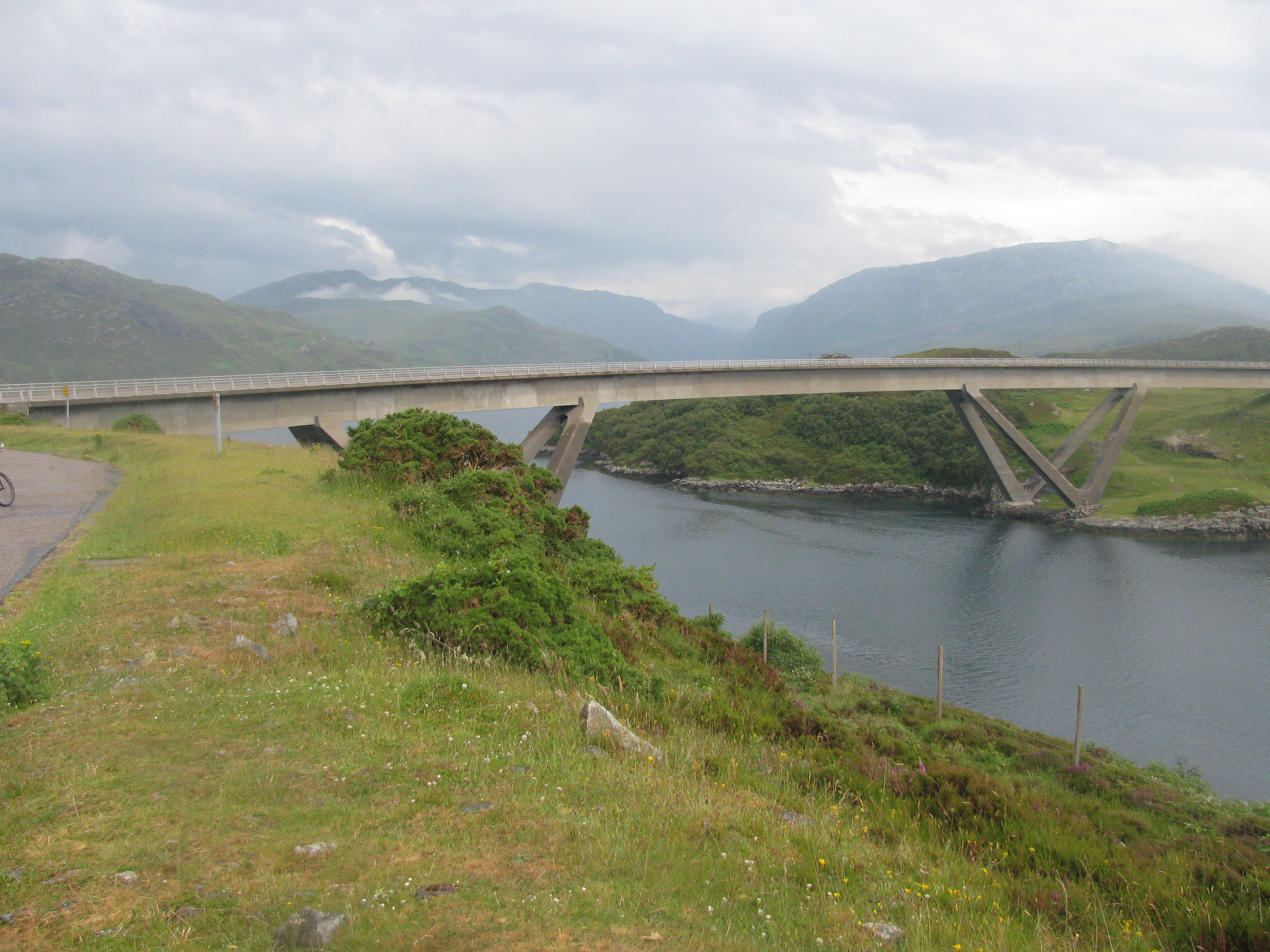
Kylesku road bridge crossing the Loch

Loch a' Chàirn Bhàin (Gaelic for "White Cairn Loch"), or Loch Cairnbawn, is a sea inlet off Eddrachillis Bay on the west coast of the Scottish Highlands north of Ullapool. It was the site of the World War Two midget submarine training base, Port HHZ.
