= Loch Linnhe =

Sea loch on the west coast of Scotland

- An Linne Sheileach (Scottish Gaelic)
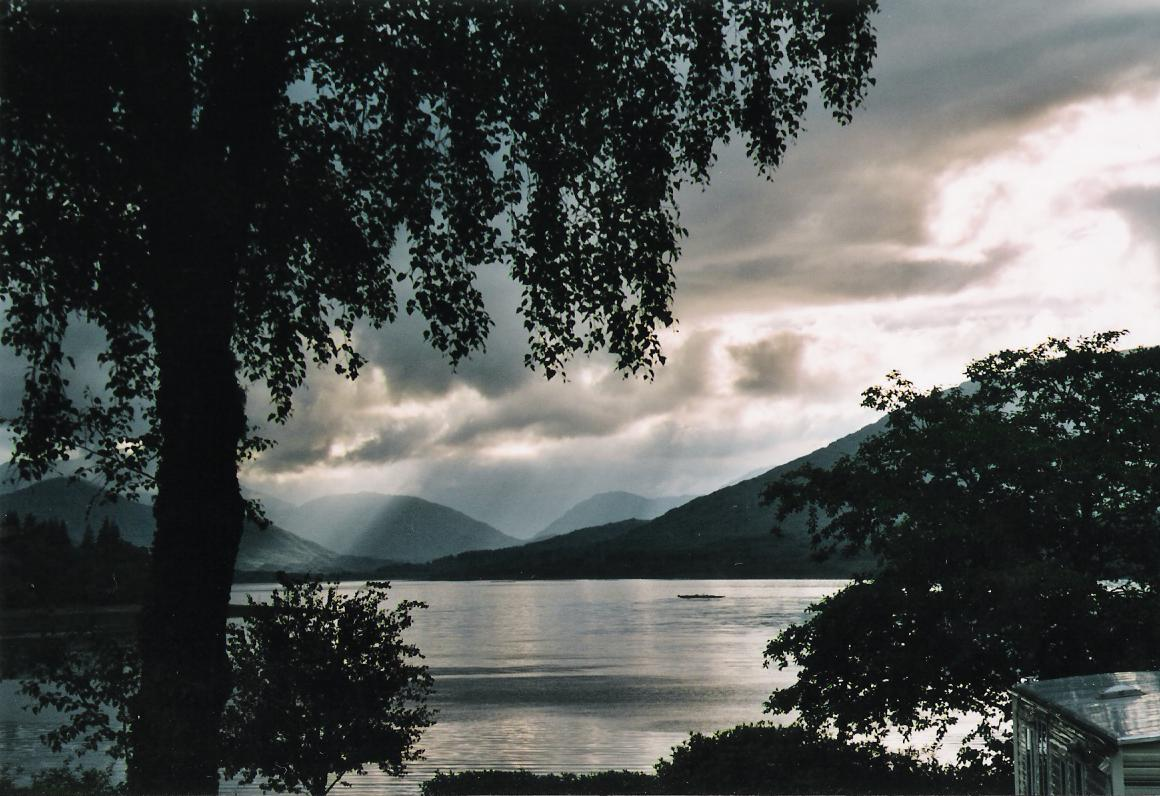
- Loch Linnhe
- Interactive map of Loch Linnhe
- Location: Highland, Scotland
- Coordinates: 56°42′05″N 5°15′43″W
- Type: Sea Loch
- Frozen: No

Loch Linnhe (/lɒx ˈlɪni/ lokh LIN-ee) is a sea loch in the Highland Council area, in the west of Scotland. The part upstream of Corran is known in Gaelic as An Linne Dhubh (the black pool, originally known as Loch Abar), and downstream as An Linne Sheileach (the salty pool). The name Linnhe is derived from the Gaelic word linne, meaning "pool".

Loch Linnhe follows the line of the Great Glen Fault, and is the only sea loch along the fault. About 35 kilometres (20 miles) long, it opens onto the Firth of Lorne at its southwestern end. The part of the loch upstream of Corran is 15 km (9 mi) long and an average of about 2 km (1 mi) wide. The southern part of the loch is wider, and its branch southeast of the island of Lismore is known as the Lynn of Lorne.

Loch Eil feeds into Loch Linnhe at the latter's northernmost point, while from the east Loch Leven feeds in the loch just downstream of Corran and Loch Creran feeds into the Lynn of Lorne. The town of Fort William lies at the northeast end of the loch, at the mouth of the River Lochy.

According to the Bard Fr. Allan MacDonald, an important figure in Scottish Gaelic literature, Loch Linnhe was said in local Scottish folklore to be the home of an each-uisge, or "water horse", whose back could accommodate all the children who wished to ride him. But when they did, the water-horse would gallop off into the nearest lake to drown and eat the children on his back. Fr. Allan MacDonald later recalled that during his childhood in nearby Fort William, "Many's the horse I wouldn't get on as a child for fear it would be the each-uisge."
