= List of Outer Hebrides =

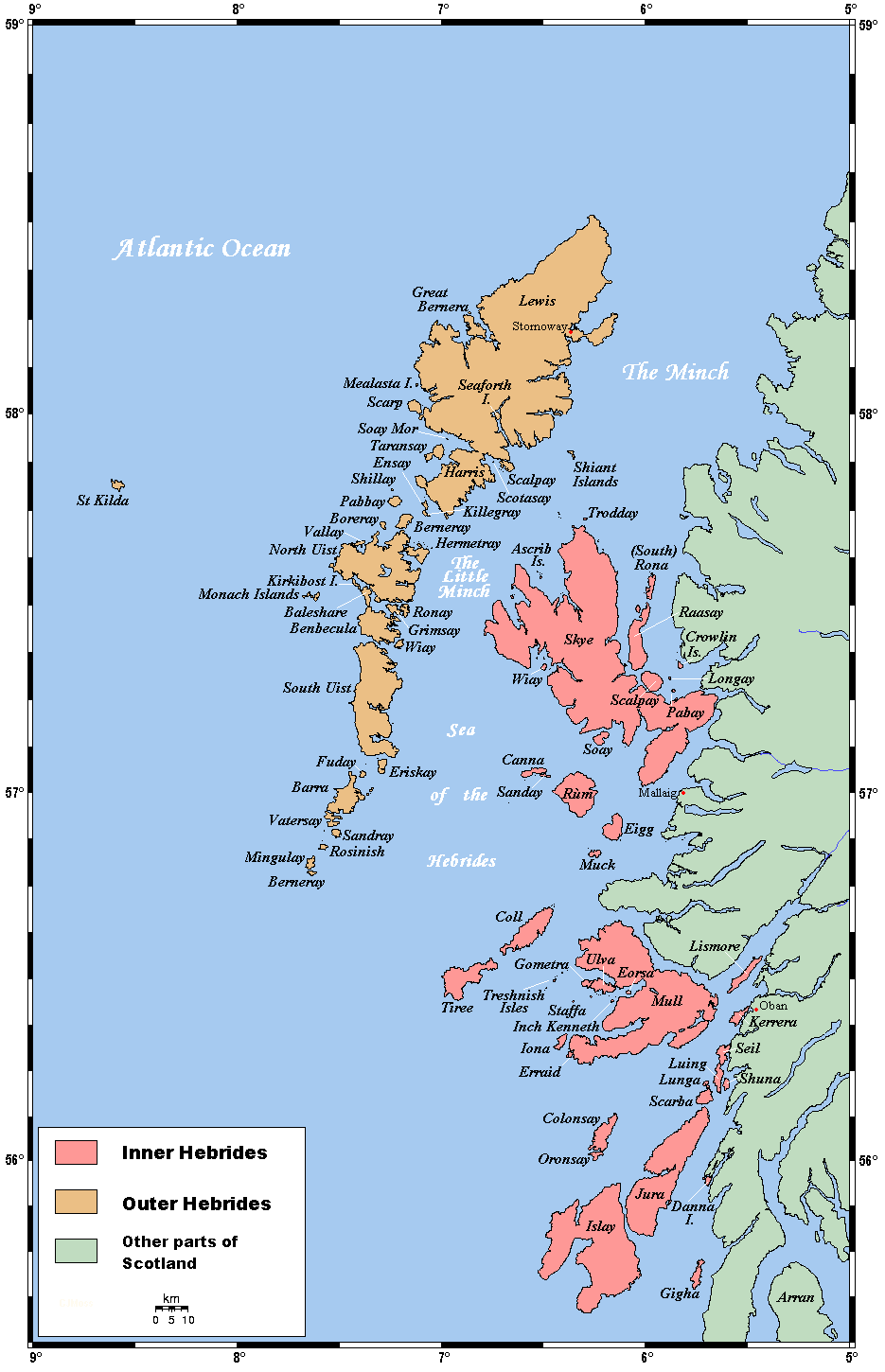
The Hebrides. The Outer Hebrides (in orange) lie to the west with the Inner Hebrides (in red) closer to the mainland of Scotland in the east.

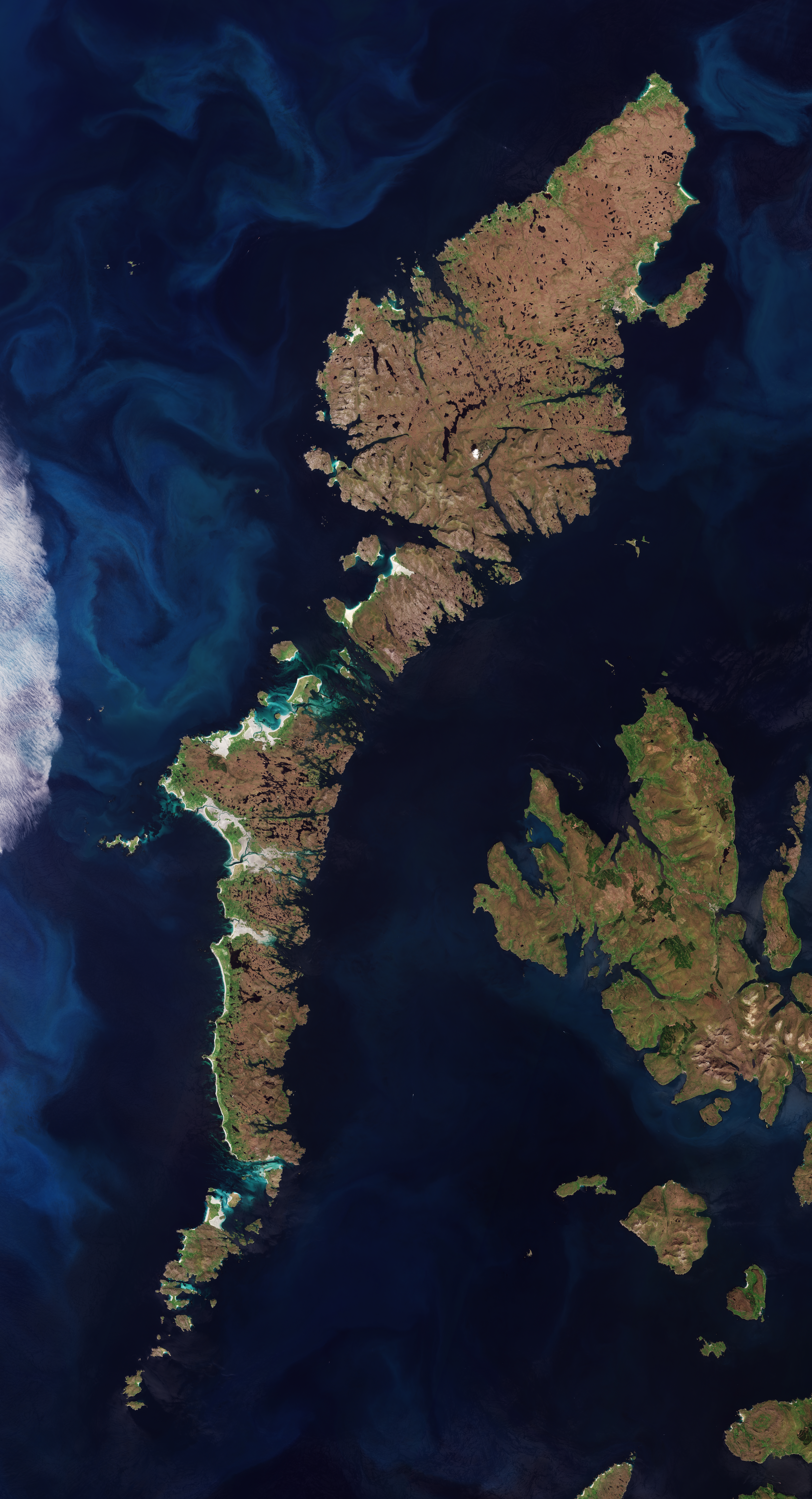
Satellite pictures of Outer Hebrides

The Outer Hebrides is a chain of more than 100 islands and small skerries located about 70 kilometres (43 mi) west of mainland Scotland. There are 15 inhabited islands in this archipelago, which is also known as the Western Isles and archaically as the Long Isle (Scottish Gaelic: An t-Eilean Fada). (Note: Murray (1973) notes that "Western Isles" has tended to mean "Outer Hebrides" since the creation of the Na h-Eileanan an Iar or Western Isles parliamentary constituency in 1918. The phrase can also be used to refer to the Hebrides in general. Murray also notes that "Gneiss Islands"—a reference to the underlying geology – is another name used to refer to the Outer Hebrides but that its use is "confined to books".)

Lewis and Harris is the largest island in Scotland and the third largest in the British Isles, after Great Britain and Ireland. It incorporates Lewis in the north and Harris in the south, both of which are frequently referred to as individual islands, although they are joined by a land border. (Note: The island does not have a common name in either English or Gaelic and is referred to as "Lewis and Harris", "Lewis with Harris", "Harris with Lewis" etc.) The largest settlement in Lewis and in the Outer Hebrides is Stornoway.

To the south across the Sound of Harris lie the Uists and Benbecula, which were joined by a series of causeways constructed between 1940 and 1960 to improve transport links. Further south are Barra and the smaller Barra Isles, whose southernmost extremity is Barra Head. There are other outliers with cultural links to the Outer Hebrides that are not part of the archipelago itself. These include the St Kilda group, which are quite distinct geologically and no longer inhabited, Sula Sgeir and North Rona to the north and isolated Rockall, which is 367 kilometres (228 mi) to the west of North Uist. (Note: Aird an Runair, North Uist approximately Mean High Water Springs ETRS89 57°36'10.42010"N 7°32'56.63226"W, grid reference NF 68686,70560. Distance to Rockall approximately 366.966 km (228.022 mi / 198.146 nmi).)

The islands of Scotland's west coast are known collectively as the Hebrides and the Outer Hebrides are separated from the Inner Hebrides by The Minch to the north and the Sea of the Hebrides to the south. The Outer Hebrides are administered by Comhairle nan Eilean Siar and had a population of 26,140 in 2022. The Outer Hebrides have historically been a strong Scottish Gaelic (Gàidhlig) speaking area. Despite recent declines, in the 2001 census more than 50% of the resident population in each island was able to speak Gaelic, for an overall total of 15,842 speakers throughout the archipelago. The modern economy centres on tourism, crofting, fishing, and weaving, the latter of which includes the manufacture of Harris tweed. The archipelago is exposed to wind and tide, and there are numerous lighthouses as an aid to navigation.

The definition of an island used in this list is that it is "land that is surrounded by seawater on a daily basis, but not necessarily at all stages of the tide, excluding human devices such as bridges and causeways". (Note: Other definitions are used in the Scottish context. For example the General Register Office for Scotland define an island as "a mass of land surrounded by water, separate from the Scottish mainland" but although they include islands linked by bridges etc. this is not clear from this definition. Haswell-Smith (2004) uses "an Island is a piece of land or group of pieces of land which is entirely surrounded by water at Lowest Astronomical Tide and to which there is no permanent means of dry access". This is widely agreed to be unhelpful as it consciously excludes bridged islands.)

== Inhabited islands ==
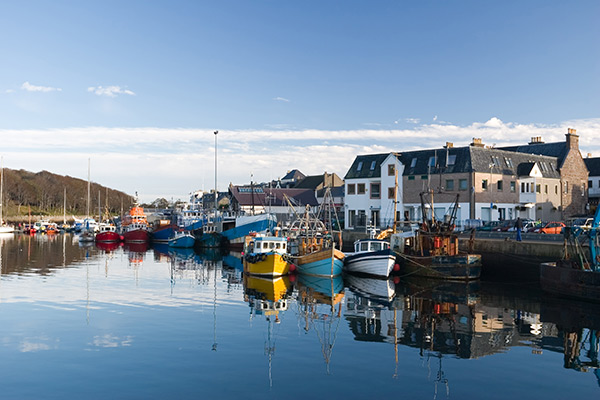
The harbour, Stornoway

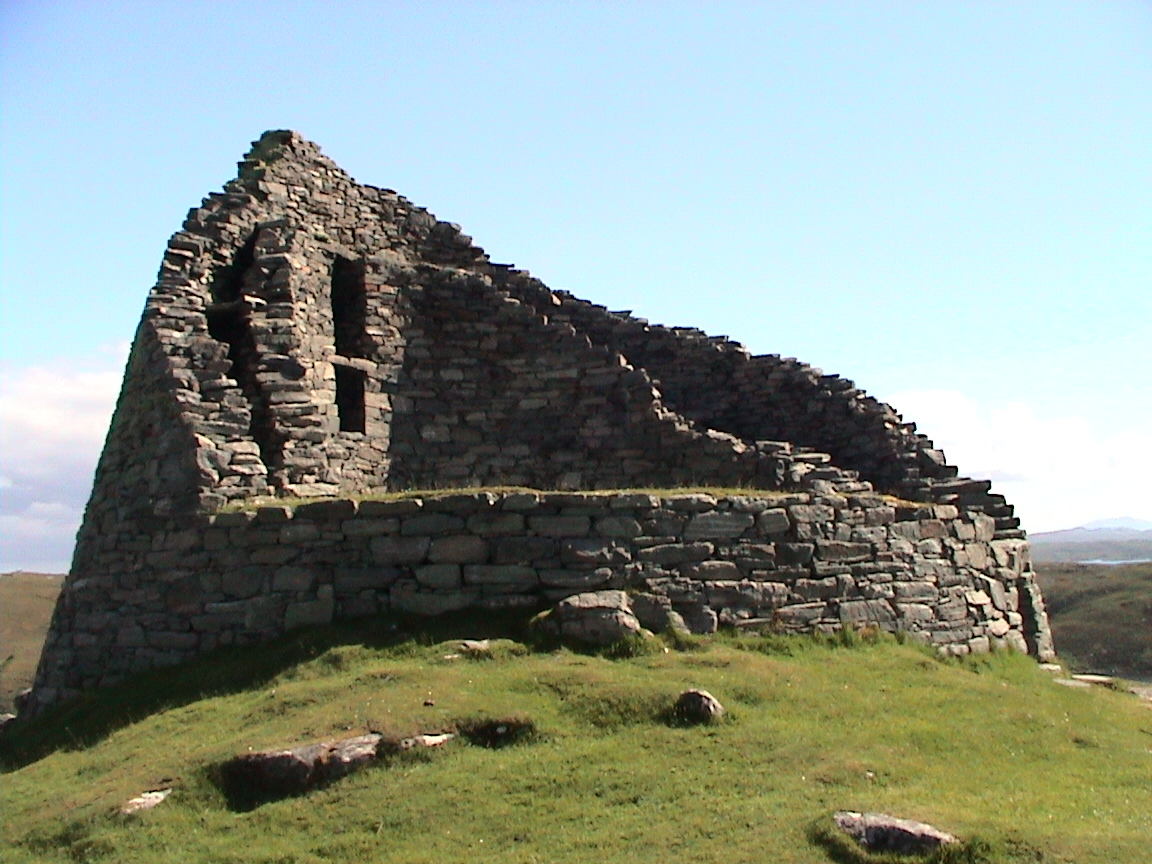
The ruins of Dun Carloway Iron Age broch

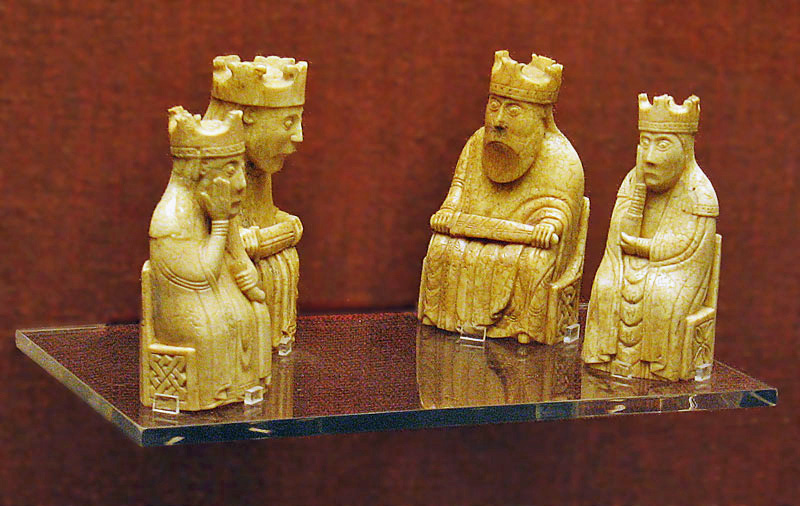
Two kings and two queens from the Lewis chessmen

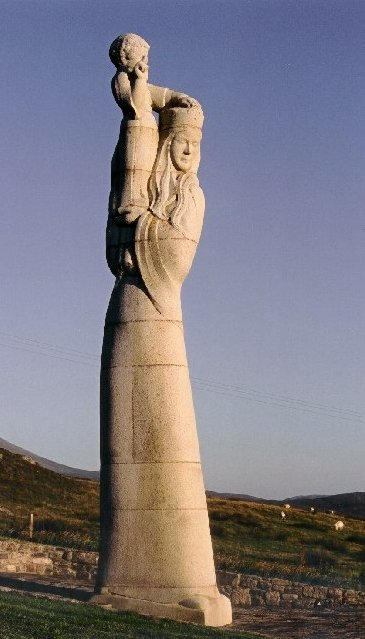
Our Lady of the Isles, South Uist

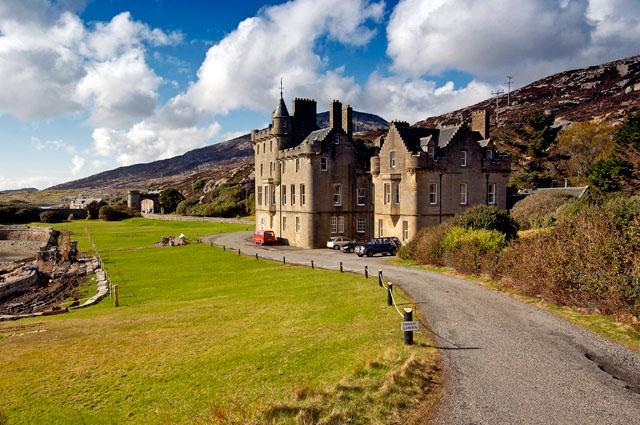
Amhuinnsuidhe Castle, Harris

The inhabited islands of the Outer Hebrides had a total population of 26,502 in 2001, 27,684 at the time of the 2011 census and was 26,140 in 2022.

The highest peaks of the islands have names deriving from both Gaelic and Old Norse indicating the historical importance of these two cultures. The archeological record for the period of Viking domination during the Early Historic period is however very limited, the Lewis chessmen being an exception.

In addition to the North Ford (Oitir Mhòr) and South Ford causeways that connect North and South Uist, Benbecula and the northern of the two Grimsays in the southern part of the island chain, several other islands are now connected by causeways and bridges. Great Bernera and Scalpay have bridge connections to Lewis and Harris respectively, Baleshare and Berneray are linked to North Uist, Eriskay to South Uist, Flodaigh, Seana Bhaile and the southern Grimsay to Benbecula, and Vatersay is connected to Barra by the Vatersay Causeway. This means that all of the inhabited islands are now connected to at least one other island by a land transport route.

Inhabited islands of the Outer Hebrides
Island	Gaelic name	Group (Note: Geographically, the inhabited islands can easily be separated into those that are or surround Lewis and Harris, The Uists and Benbecula, and Barra.)	Area (ha)	Population	Highest point	Height (m) (Note: The Ordnance Survey maps mark the height above sea level of a high point on most islands, but in a small number of cases, this may not be the highest point.)
Baleshare	Am Baile Sear	Uists and Benbecula	910	53		12
Barra	Barraigh	Barra	5,875	1,209	Heaval	383
Benbecula	Beinn nam Fadhla	Uists and Benbecula	8,203	1,255	Ruaval	124
Berneray	Beàrnaraigh	Uists and Benbecula	1,010	142	Beinn Shleibhe	93
Boreray	Boraraigh	Uists and Benbecula	198	1	Mullach Mòr	56
Eilean a' Ghiorr	Eilean a' Ghiorr	Uists and Benbecula	7	1		10
Eilean Leathann	Eilean Leathann	Uists and Benbecula	6.5	1		10
Eriskay	Èirisgeigh	Uists and Benbecula	703	158	Ben Scrien	185
Flodaigh	Flodaigh	Uists and Benbecula	145	4 (Note: The 2001 and 2011 censuses refer to the island by its anglified name of Flodda.)		20
Great Bernera	Beàrnaraigh Mòr	Lewis (Loch Ròg)	2,122	212		87
Grimsay (North) (Note: There are two inhabited islands called "Grimsay" or Griomasaigh that are joined to Benbecula by a road causeway, one to the north at grid reference NF855572 and one to the south east at grid reference NF831473.)	Griomasaigh	Uists and Benbecula	833	149		22
Grimsay (South) (Note: See above note.)	Griomasaigh	Uists and Benbecula	117	27		20
Killegray	Ceileagraigh	Sound of Harris	176	1		45
Lewis and Harris	Leòdhas agus na Hearadh	Lewis and Harris	217,898	19,680	Clisham	799
North Uist	Uibhist a Tuath	Uists and Benbecula	30,305	1,208	Eaval	347
Scalpay	Sgalpaigh na Hearadh	Harris	653	282	Beinn Scorabhaig	104
Seana Bhaile	Seana Bhaile	Uists and Benbecula	55	15 (Note: This island is at (grid reference NF860580) and the evidence of both Ordnance Survey maps and photographs (e.g. "Houses on Seana Bhaile" Geograph. Retrieved 10 August 2009) indicate a resident population. However, neither the 2011 census nor the main reference work (Haswell-Smith 2004) referred to the island at all. Its population was presumably included in nearby Grimsay by the census until 2022 when it was listed.)	Cnoc Mòr	11
South Uist	Uibhist a Deas	Uists and Benbecula	32,026	1,650	Beinn Mhòr	620
Vatersay	Bhatarsaigh	Barra	960	83	Theiseabhal Mòr	190

Ensay, Kisimul Castle and Eilean na Cille are "included in the NRS statistical geography for inhabited islands but had no usual residents at the time of either the 2001 or 2011 censuses".

== Uninhabited islands ==
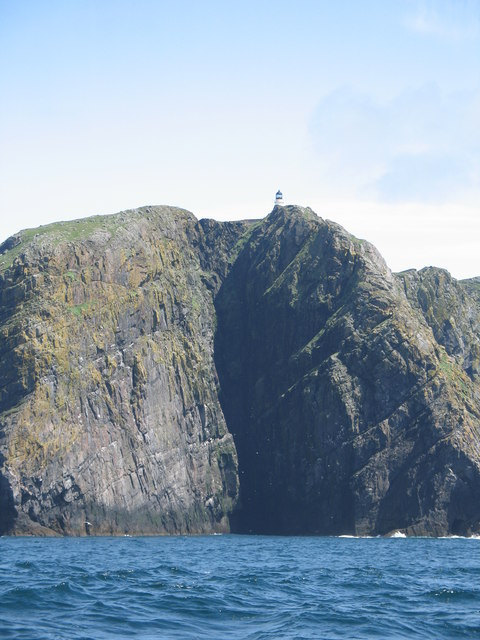
The lighthouse atop the cliffs of Sloc na Bèiste, Barra Head

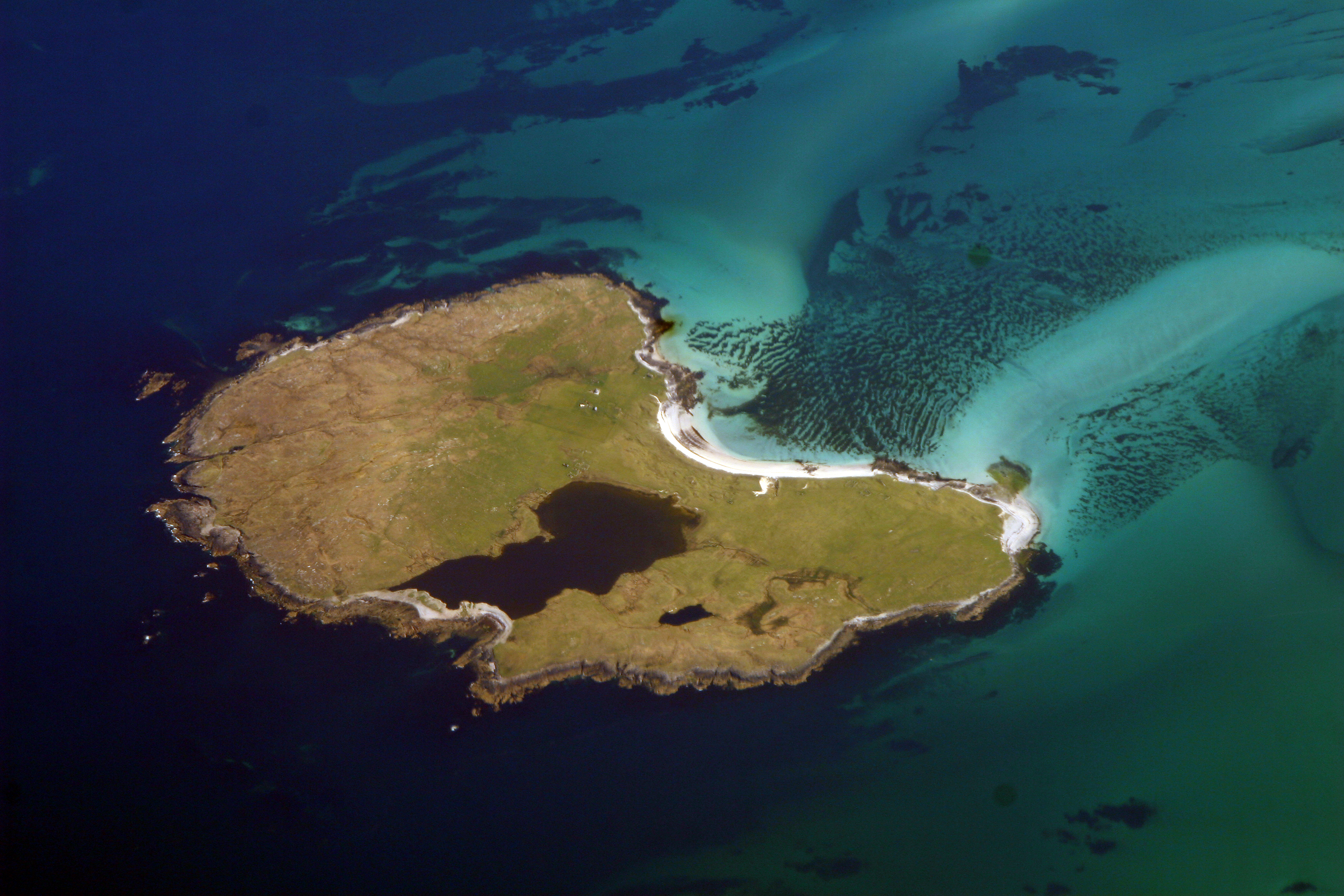
Boreray, North Uist

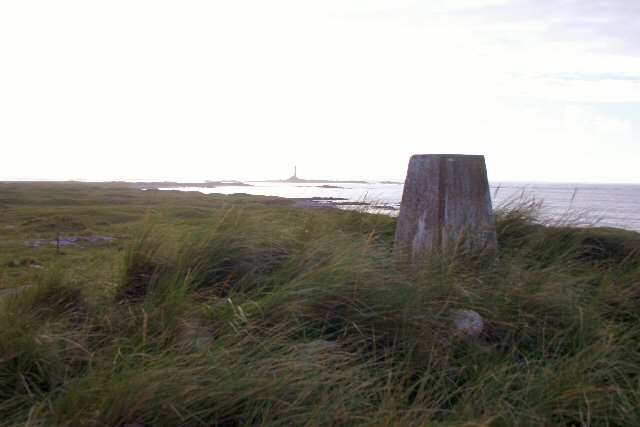
Cnoc Bhàrr on Ceann Iar is the highest point of the Monach Islands at only 19 metres (62 ft). Shillay can be seen in the distance.

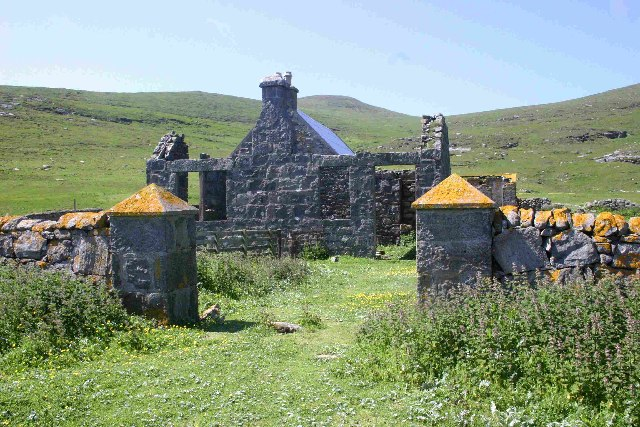
Ruins of the old school house, Mingulay

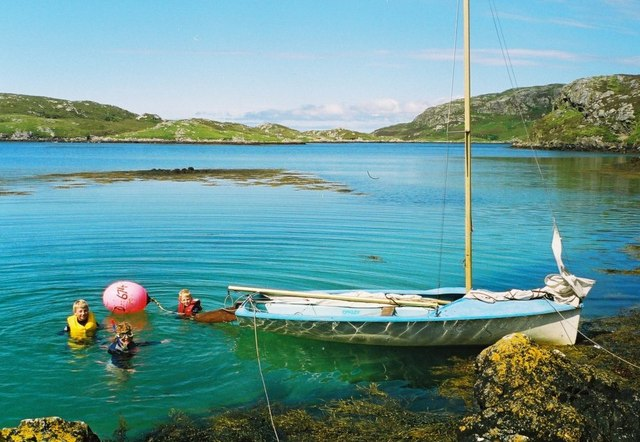
Hintinish Bay, Hellisay in summer

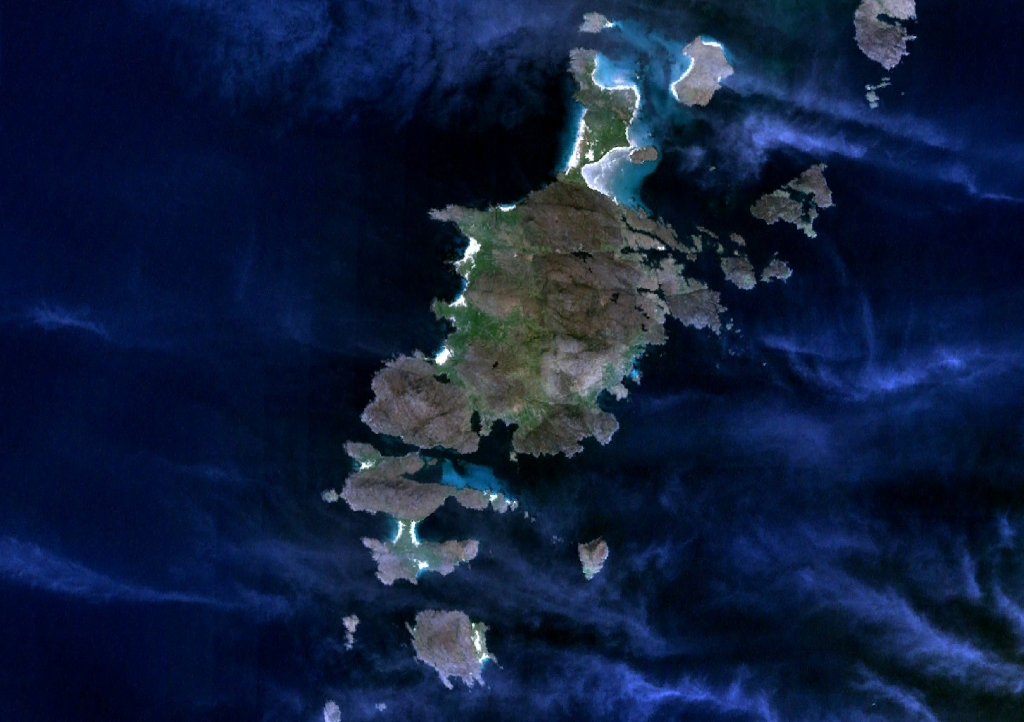
Barra from space. Eriskay is to the north at the top, with Fiaraidh, Fuday, Orosay, Gighay and Hellisay further south in the Sound of Barra. Sandray and Vatersay are to the south of Barra itself.

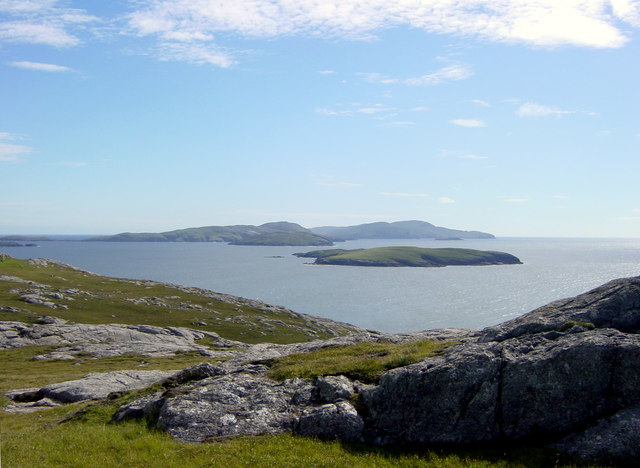
Flodday, Lingeigh and Pabbay from Vatersay

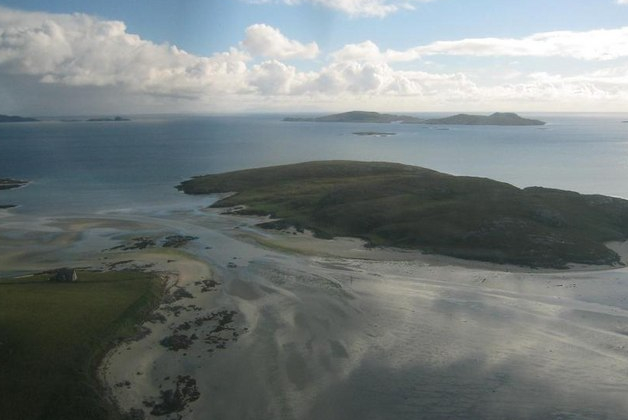
Orosay from the air, with Gighay and Hellisay beyond.

This is a list of islands with an area greater than 25 hectares (approximately 37 acres). Records for the last date of settlement for the smaller uninhabited islands are incomplete, but most of the islands listed here would have been inhabited at some point during the Neolithic, Iron Age, Early Historic or Norse periods.

In common with the other main island chains of Scotland many of the more remote islands were abandoned during the 19th and 20th centuries, in some cases after continuous habitation since the prehistoric period. This process involved a transition from these places being perceived as relatively self-sufficient agricultural economies to a view becoming held by both island residents and outsiders alike that the more remote islands lacked the essential services of a modern industrial economy.

Some of the islands continue to contribute to modern culture. The "Mingulay Boat Song", although evocative of island life, was written after the abandonment of the island in 1938 and Taransay hosted the BBC television series ‘’Castaway 2000’’. Others have played a part in Scottish history. On 4 May 1746, Bonnie Prince Charlie hid on Eilean Liubhaird with some of his men for four days whilst Royal Navy vessels patrolled the Minch. They camped under a sail stretched over a "low pitiful hut" while it rained torrentially.

The difficulties of definition are considerable in some cases. For example, Haswell-Smith (2004) treats Eileanan Iasgaich (Note: Eileanan Iasgaich is at grid reference NF785186.) as a single island of 50 ha, although during high tides it becomes several tidal islets—none of which is ever connected to the "mainland" of South Uist. Despite its name Eilean an Taighe (English: "house island") in the Shiant Islands does not qualify for inclusion as it is connected to Garbh Eilean by a natural isthmus.

Uninhabited islands of the Outer Herbides
Island	Gaelic name	Group (Note: Geographically, these islands can be separated into those surrounding Lewis and Harris, North and South Uist, Benbecula, and Barra—plus those that are members of the smaller archipelagos of the Barra Isles, the Flannan Isles, the Monach Isles, and the Shiant Islands. There is also a complex group that lies between North Uist and Harris in the Sound of Harris.)	Area (ha)	Last inhabited (Note: Indicates the last known date of permanent, year round settlement.)	Highest point	Height (m) (Note: Note that the Ordnance Survey maps mark the height above sea level of a high point on most islands, but in a small number of cases, this may not be the highest point.)
Barra Head or Berneray	Beàrnaraigh Cheann Bharraigh	Barra Isles	204	1980	Sotan	193
Calbhaigh	Calbhaigh	South Uist (Note: Calbhaigh is a tidal islet in Loch Eynort, not to be confused with Calvay or Calbhaigh in Loch Boisdale, both of which are also off South Uist.)	26	Unknown		10
Ceabhaigh	Ceabhaigh	Lewis (Loch Ròg)	25	Unknown		20
Ceallasaigh Beag	Ceallasaigh Beag	Loch Maddy	55	Unknown		10
Ceallasaigh Mòr	Ceallasaigh Mòr	Loch Maddy	55	Unknown		10
Ceann Ear	An Ceann Ear	Monach Islands	203	1931–33		17
Ceann Iar	An Ceann Iar	Monach Islands	154	1931–33	Cnoc Bharr	19
Eilean Chaluim Chille	Eilean Chaluim Chille	Lewis (Loch Erisort)	85	Post-16th century	Creag Mhor	43
Eilean Chearstaidh	Eilean Chearstaigh	Lewis (Loch Ròg)	77	No census records		37
Eileanan Iasgaich	Eileanan Iasgaich	South Uist	50	No census records		20
Eilean Liubhaird	Eilean Liubhaird	Lewis (Loch Sealg)	125	Early 19th century		76
Eilean Mhealasta	Eilean Mhealasta	Lewis (Park)	124	1823	Cnoc Àrd	77
Eilean Mhuire	Eilean Mhuire	Shiant Islands	30	18th century		90
Ensay	Easaigh	Sound of Harris	186	1971		49
Fiaraidh	Fiaraigh	Sound of Barra	41	No record of habitation		30
Flodaigh	Flodaigh	Lewis (Loch Ròg)	39	1827		48
Flodaigh Mòr	Flodaigh Mòr	North Uist	58	No census records		28
Flodday (Note: There are two "Flodday"s near Barra. One is in the Barra Isles at grid reference NL612924, the other in the Sound of Barra to the north at grid reference NF751022.)	Flodaigh	Barra Isles	35	Inhabitation unlikely		43
Flodday (Note: See above note.)	Flodaigh	Sound of Barra	40	1851		41
Fodragaigh	Fodragaigh	Benbecula	25	Unknown		10
Fuaigh Beag	Fuaigh Beag	Lewis (Loch Ròg)	35	1827		48
Fuaigh Mòr	Fuaigh Mòr	Lewis (Loch Ròg)	84	1840s (Note: It is said that the Clearances here were of a particularly brutal nature.)	Mullach na Beinne	67
Fuday	Fuideigh	Sound of Barra	232	1901	Mullach Neacail	89
Fuiay	Fuidheigh	Sound of Barra	84	Mid-19th century		107
Garbh Eilean	Garbh Eilean	Shiant Islands	143	1901	Mullach Buidhe	160
Gighay	Gioghaigh	Sound of Barra	96	Early 19th century	Mullach a' Chàrnain	95
Groaigh	Groaigh	Sound of Harris	28	Unknown		26
Hellisay	Theiliseigh	Sound of Barra	142	1890	Beinn a' Chàrnain	72
Hermetray	Theàrnatraigh	Sound of Harris	72	1840s	Compass Knoll	35
Kirkibost	Eilean Chirceboist	North Uist	205	Unknown		10
Lingeigh	Lingeigh	Barra Isles	27	Inhabitation unlikely		83
Little Bernera	Beàrnaraigh Beag	Lewis (Loch Ròg)	138	1861	Tordal	41
Mingulay	Miùghalaigh	Barra Isles	640	1912	Càrnan	273
Muldoanich	Maol Dòmhnaich	Barra Isles	78	No census records	Maol Dòmhnaich	153
Orosay	Orasaigh	Sound of Barra	c. 30	Unknown		38
Oronsay	Orasaigh	North Uist	85	19th century		25
Pabbay	Pabaigh	Barra Isles	250	1911–20	An Tobha	171
Pabbay	Pabaigh	Harris	820	1930s (Note: Pabbay had a population of about 100 in the early 19th century but was cleared in 1846 and by 1868 there was only a single shepherd living there.)	Beinn a' Chàrnain	196
Pabaigh Mòr	Pabaigh Mòr	Lewis (Loch Ròg)	101	1827	Beinn Mhòr	68
Ronay	Rònaigh	North Uist	563	1920s	Beinn á Charnain	115
Sandray	Sanndraigh	Barra Isles	385	1934	Carn Ghaltair	207
Scarp	An Sgarp	Harris	1,045	1971	Sròn Romul	308
Seaforth Island	Eilean Shìophoirt	Lewis (Loch Seaforth)	273	No record of habitation		217
Sgeotasaigh	Sgeotasaigh	Harris (East Loch Tarbert)	49	1921		57
Sibhinis	Sibhinis	Monach Islands	28	Unknown		15
Shillay	Siolaigh	North Uist	47	No evidence of habitation		79
Soay Mor	Sòdhaigh Mòr	Harris	45	1890s		37
Stromay	Stròmaigh (Note: The Gaelic name is Stromaigh in the Gazetteer for Scotland and the English name "Stromay" is used both here and by the JNCC. The Ordnance Survey calls the island Sròmaigh but this is not used in other sources. It is connected to North Uist at all but the highest stages of the tide and a JNCC report describes it as "the low 'island' of Stromay".)	Sound of Harris	66	Unknown		16
Stockinish Island	Eilean Stocainis	Harris	49	No record of habitation		44
Stuley	Stulaigh	South Uist	45	19th century? (Note: Haswell-Smith (2004) writes "old lazybeds and a few scattered shieling ruins show that Stuley was probably yet another place where people who were considered of less importance than sheep fought to survive.")		40
Sursaigh	Sursaigh	Sound of Harris	30	Unknown		27
Tahay	Taghaigh	Sound of Harris	53	1850s		65
Taransay	Tarasaigh	Harris	1,475	1974	Ben Raah	267
Trialabreac	Trialabreac	Benbecula	25	Unknown		20
Torogaigh	Torogaigh	Sound of Harris	28	Unknown		13
Vacsay	Bhacasaigh	Lewis (Loch Ròg)	41	1869		34
Vallay	Bhàlaigh	North Uist	260	19th century?	Ceann Uachdarach	38
Wiay	Fuidheigh	Benbecula	375	1901	Beinn a' Tuath	102

The Eileanan Chearabhaigh are a complex group of islets off the east coast of Benbecula, the area of which changes as the tides rise and fall. The total area is circa 49 hectares and the largest part that might be considered to be a genuine island is circa 32 hectares.

== Smaller islets and skerries ==
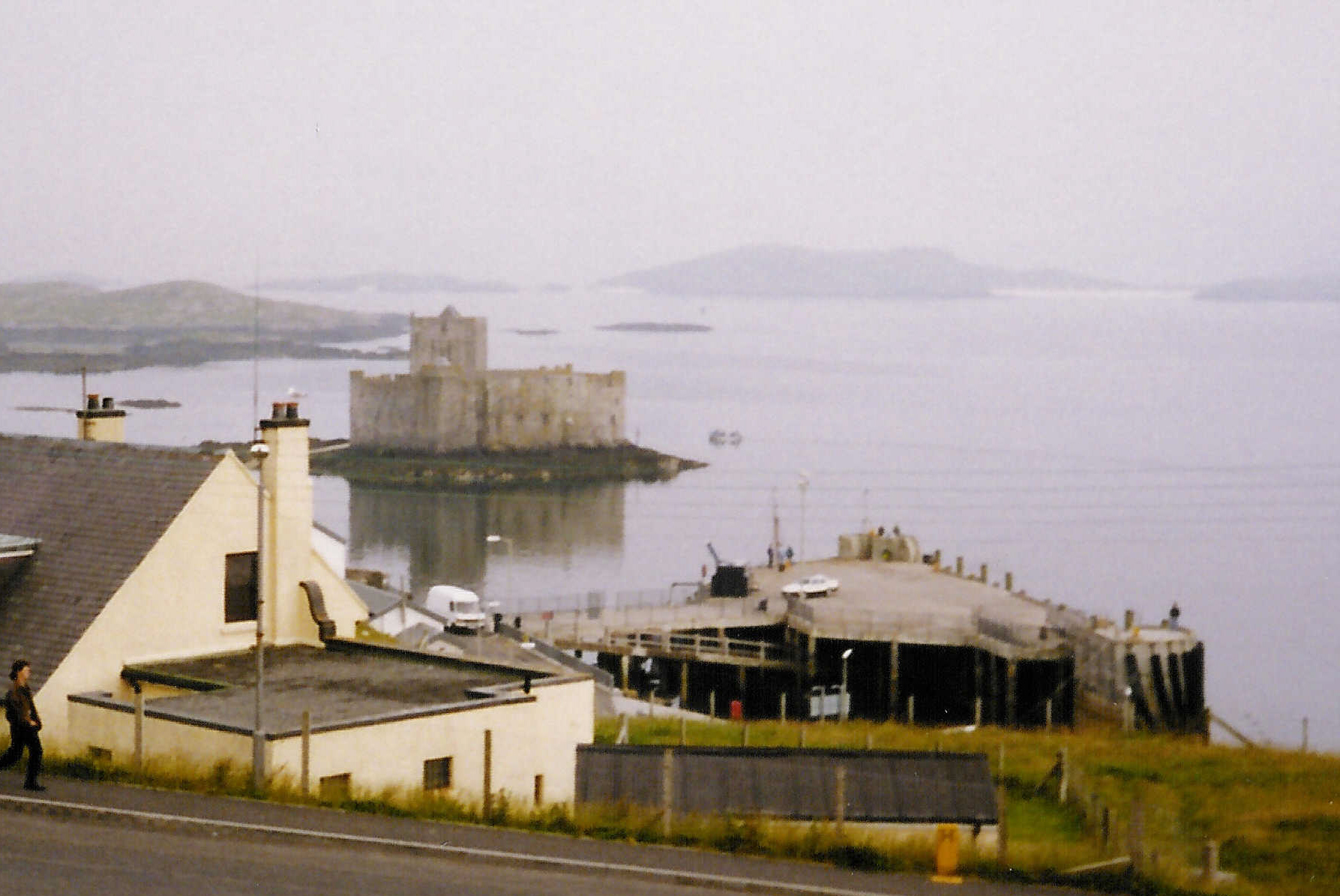
Kisimul Castle, the ancient seat of Clan MacNeil, Castlebay, Barra

Smaller islands, tidal islets only separated at higher stages of the tide, and skerries that are only exposed at lower stages of the tide pepper the North Atlantic surrounding the main islands. This is a continuing list of these smaller Outer Hebridean islands.

Many of them are obscure and few have ever been inhabited. Nonetheless, some have a significant degree of notability. The islet on which Kisimul Castle stands is the ancient seat of Clan MacNeil and Shillay in the Monach Isles had a staffed lighthouse until 1942. The tiny Beasts of Holm of the east coast of Lewis were the site of the sinking of the Iolaire during the first few hours of 1919, one of the worst maritime disasters in United Kingdom waters during the 20th century. Calvay in the Sound of Barra provided the inspiration for Compton MacKenzie's 1947 novel Whiskey Galore after the SS Politician ran aground there with a cargo of whisky. Unusually for an island without permanent inhabitation, Eilean na Cille (NF847459) is connected to Grimsay (south) by a causeway.

Various Gaelic names are used repeatedly. The suffix ay or aigh or aidh is generally from the Norse øy meaning "island". Eilean (plural: eileanan) also means "island". Beag and mòr (also bheag and mhòr) mean "little" and "big" and are often found together. Sgeir is "skerry" and often refers to a rock or rocks that lie submerged at high tide. Dubh is "black", dearg is "red" and glas means "grey" or "green". Orasaigh is from the Norse Örfirirsey meaning "tidal" or "ebb island".

Smaller islands grouped geographically:

=== Barra and the Barra Isles ===
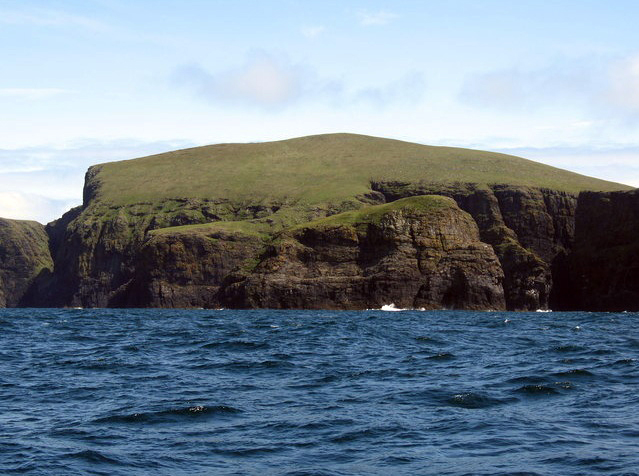
The western cliffs of Mingulay with the stack of Arnamuil at centre

- Barra: Eilean a' Mhail, Eilean Mhiathlais, Eileanan Dubha, Greanamul, Healam, Kisimul Castle, Lamalum, Lingeigh-Fada, Orasaigh (2), Sgeir Mhòr, Sgeirislum
- Barra Head: Rubha Niosaim and Sgeir Mhòr
- Flodday: None
- Lingeigh: None.
- Mingulay: Arnamuil, Barnacle Rock, Geirum Beag, Geirum Mòr, Gunamul. Lianamul, Sgeirean nan Uibhein, Solon Beag, Solon Mòr, Sròn à Dùin and The Red Boy.
- Muldoanich: An Laogh, Sgeirean Fiaclach.
- Pabbay: Greenamul, Heisgeir a-muigh, Heisgeir a-staigh, Lingeigh, Roisnis
- Sandray: Cleite, Creag an Sheadair, Eilean Mòr, Sgeir Lithinis
- Vatersay: Biruaslum, Orasaigh, Sgeir Liath, Sgeir na Muice, Snuasamul, Uineasan

=== Sound of Barra ===
- Eriskay: Calbhaigh, Eilean à Gheoidh, Eileanan Dubha, Hearteamul, Lingay, Na Stacan Dubha, Sgeir an Fheidh
- Fiaraidh: Corran Bàn
- Flodday: Snagaras
- Fuday: Traillisgeir
- Fuiay: Eilean Sheumis, Garbh Lingeigh
- Gighay: Eilean à Ceud
- Hellisay: Bodha nan Sgeiran Mòra
- Orosay: None

=== South Uist ===
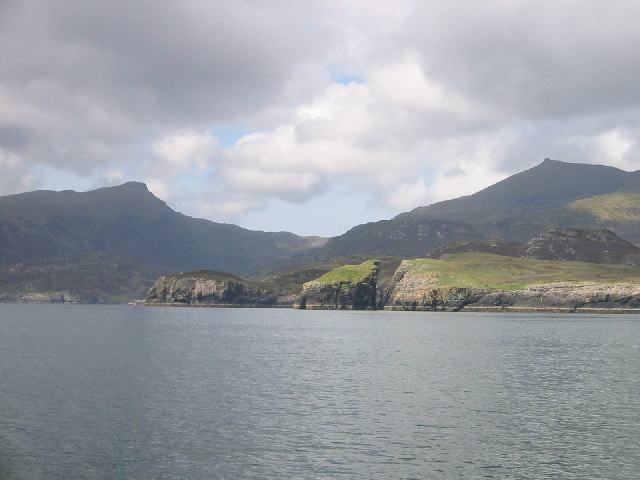
Beinn Mhòr and Thacla in the distance and Dùn Othail and Nicholson's Leap in the foreground

- West coast: Eilean Bheirean, Eilean Cuithe nam Fiadh, Gualan, Orasaigh
- North east coast: Dioraigh, Eilean à Mhadaidh, Eilean Ban, Eilean Ornais, Eilean na h-Airde Mhoire, Gasaigh, Glas-Eileanan, Luirsaigh Dubh, Luirsaigh Glas, Orasaigh, Sioloagh Mòr, Tathanais
- East coast: Cleit a' Ghlinn Mhòir, Dùn Othail, Eilean Bholuim, Eilean nan Ghamna, Na Dubh-sgeiran
- Loch Aineort: Eilean Ailein, Eilean an Easbuig, Eilean Mhic Eachain, Rosgaigh, Unsaraigh Islands
- Lochboisdale:
  - Eileanan Iasgaich: Main group: Eilean Bàgh Mhic Rois, Eileanan Iasgaich Beag, Eileanan Iasgaich Meadhonach, Eileanan Iasgaich Mòr, Eilean nam Feannag. Surrounding: Eilean Mòr, Eilean nan Moireachean, Gasaigh, Pabaigh, Sgeir Chaise. Further east: Calbhaigh, Calvay Castle.
- Stuley: Dubh-Sgeir Mhòr, Glas-Eilean Mòr

=== Benbecula ===
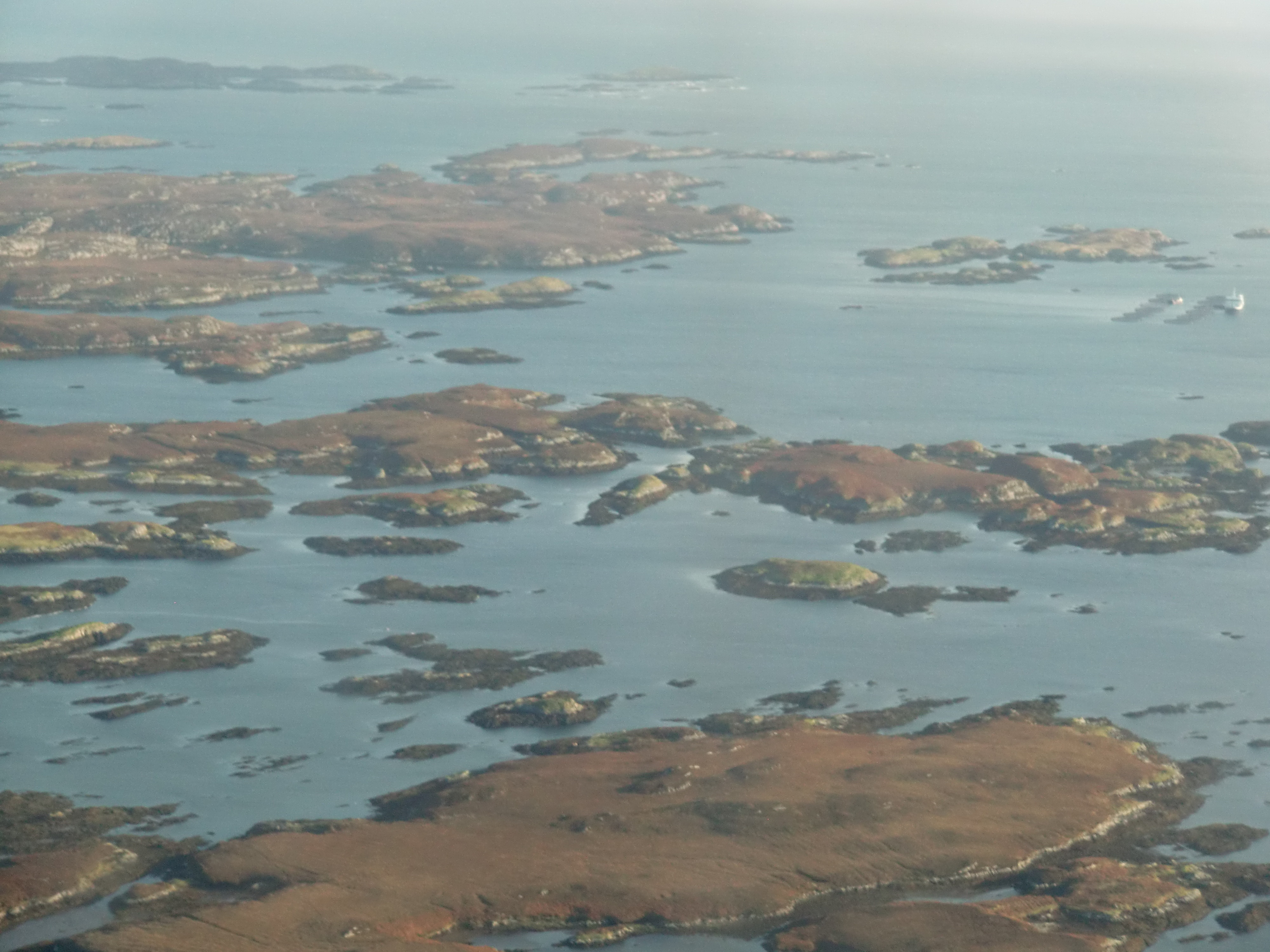
Islands in Loch Uisgebhagh. Bearran is at top right, Orasaigh, middle right and the peninsula of Meanais at top left. Eilean nan Each, Maragaidh Beag and Maragaidh Mòr are in the distance.

- North coast: Calabhagh, Eilean Leathann, Eilean Mhic Caoilte, Sunamul, Traillabreac Mòr
- East coast: Bearran, Collam, Eilean Baile Gearriadh, Eilean Dubh na Muice, Eilean nan Each, Fuidheigh Beag, Greanamul, Greanamul Deas, Maithidh Glas, Maithidh Riabhach, Maragaidh Beag, Maragaidh Mòr, Orasaigh (2), Orasaigh Uisgeabhagh
- South coast: Eilean Ard an Eoin, Heistamuil
- Seana Bhaile: Eilean a’ Bhàigh-ghlais, Eilean nan Saighead, Eilean Rointch
- Flodaigh: Lingay and numerous others but none named by Ordnance Survey
- Grimsay (North): Eilean à Ghobha, Eilean Mòr
- Grimsay (South): Caraigh Mhòr, Eilean na Cille, Eilean nan Gamhna, Eileanan Stafa, Oitir Bheag, Siusaigh, Steiseigh
- Ronay: Eilean an Fheidh, Eilean na Clioche, Eilean nan h-Iolaire, Eilean nan Gamhna, Eilean nan Gearr, Garbh Eilean Mòr, Huanariagh
- Wiay: An Dubh-sgeir à Deas, Cleit Mhòr, Lingeigh, Reagam, Scaracleit

=== North Uist ===
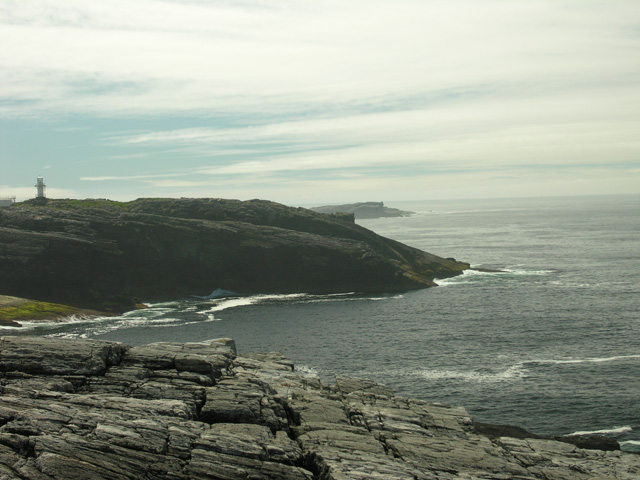
Haskeir Lighthouse, with Haskeir Eagach in the distance

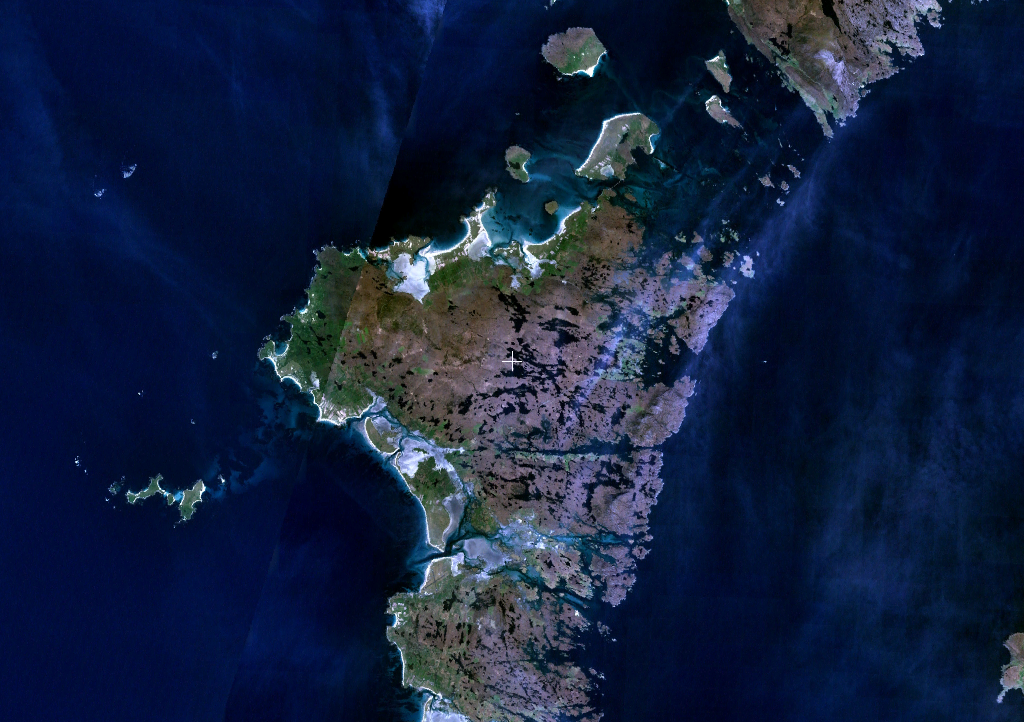
North Uist and surrounding islands. The Monach Isles are at left, Pabbay in the Sound of Harris is at top centre, Loch Maddy and narrow Loch Euphort at right

- North west coast: Eilean Mhorain, Haskeir, Hesgeir Eagach, Lingeigh
  - Traigh Bhalaigh: Eilean Dubh Mòr, Stangram, Torogaigh
- Sound of Harris, East:
  - Loch Mhic Phail: Cafuam, Croabhagun, Eilean Fhionnlaidh, Frobost Island, Hestum, Mealla Bru, Rangas, Teilum
- West Coast: Causamul, Eilean Trostain
- East coast:
  - Loch Euphort: Eilean an Stiobuill, Eilean Mhic Shealtair, Eilean nam Mult, Orasaigh, Riobhaig Mhòr, Steisaigh, Treanaigh
  - Loch nam Madadh: Cnap Ruigh Dubh, Eilean Bhalaig, Eilean Phail, Fathoire, Fearamas, Flodaigh, Glas Eilean Mòr, Hamarsaigh, Madadh Beag, Madadh Gruamach, Madadh Mòr, Oronsay
    - Ceallasaigh Mòr: Orasay
    - Ceallasaigh Beag: Callum More, Cliasagh Beag, Cliasagh Mor, Corr Eilean Keallasay, Eileanan Dhomhnuill, Eilean Bridich, Eilean Gheoidh, Eilean Mhidhinis, Eilean nan Lion, Fearamas, Lonachan, Rhiobhagan Mhidhinis
- South Coast: Craigionn, Eilean an Teampaill, Eilean Iochdrach, Eilean Mòr
  - Causeway: Eileanan Glasa, Eilean na h-Airigh, Gairbh-eilean
- Baleshare: Bhorogaigh, Eilean Mòr, Eilean nan Carnan, Glas-eilean Beag, Horaigh
- Flodaigh Mòr: Duibh-eilean, Flodaigh Beag
- Kirkibost: Bior Eilean, Eilean Mòr, Sromaigh
- Oronsay: Fuskafaol, Greanam, Lingay
- Vallay: Dun Tomaidh, Mororish, Saltam, Sgeir Dubh Mòr

=== Monach Isles ===
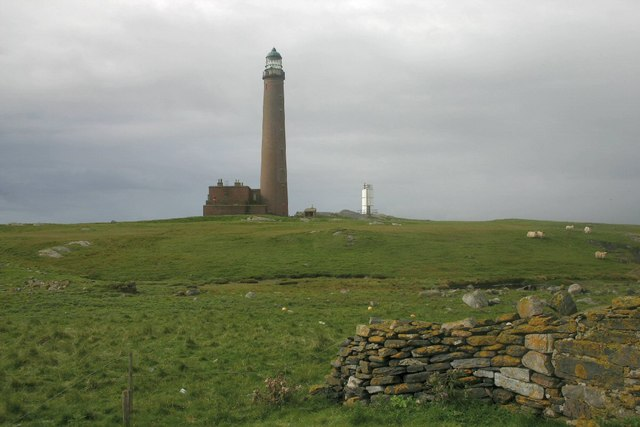
The lighthouse on Shillay

- Ceann Ear: Heilleam, Stocaigh
- Ceann Iar: Deasgair, Raisgeir, Stromay
  - Shillay: Eilean Siorruidh, Thusigeirean
- Sibhinis: None

=== Sound of Harris ===
- Harris – Rubha Reinis to Gob an Tobha: Bumersam Beag, Copaigh, Crago, Dun Arn, Eilean Reinis, Eire, Gilsaigh, Gousman, Gumersam Mhòr, Langaigh, Liungaigh, Saghaigh Beag, Saghaigh Mòr, Sgarabhaigh, Sgeir Sine, Sromaigh
- Berneray: Bhaiteam, Greineam
- Boreray: Bogha Mairi, Spuir
- Ensay: Creag Ruadh, Dubh Sgeir, Sleicham, Sromaigh, Suam
- Hermetray: Bhacasaigh, Dun Mhic Leathann, Eileana Dubha, Fuam, Greineam, Grodaigh, Hulmatraigh, Orasaigh, Righe nam Ban
- Killegray: Caolaigh, Eilean Chodam, Eilean na Ceardaich, Langa Sgeir, Sgeir Dhubh, Sgeir Mhurain
- Pabbay: Cuidhnis
- Shillay: Siolaigh Beag
- Stromay: Heastam Sròmaigh, Rusgaigh, Orasaigh
- Tahay: Bhotarsaigh, Cleite nan Luch, Creag nan Sealladh, Fuam na h-Ola, Narstaigh, Opasaigh, Sarstaigh, Sgeir à Chuain, Trollaman

=== West Harris ===
- Gob an Tobha to Rubha Huisinis: Gaisgeir, Glas-sgeir, Gloraig Huisinis, Gloraig Tharasaigh, Iosaigh
- Rubha Huisinis to Ceann Loch Resort: Greine Sgeir,
- Scarp: Cearstaigh, Duisgeir, Fladaigh
- Soay Mòr: Soay Beag
- Taransay: None

=== East Harris ===
- Loch Seaforth: Eilean Mharaig, Glas Sgeir
- Àrd Caol to Rubha Crago: Eilean Reiningeadil
- Rubha Crago to Rubha Bocaig (including East Loch Tarbert): Cuidsgeir, Eilean à Gheoidh, Eileanan à Ghille-bheid, Eilean Aird Rainis, Eilean an Direcleit, Eilean Dubh, Eilean Mhic Fionnlaidh, Eilean na Gearrabreac, Eilean na Sgaite, Gloraig à Chaimbeulach, Gloraig Dubh, Gloraig Iosal, Sgeir an Leim Mhoir, Sgeir Glas, Sgeir Urgha
- Rubha Bocaig to Rubha Reinis: (see also Stockinish Island): Bhalaigh, Caiream, Corr-eilean, Eilean Chuidhtinis, Eilean Dubh, Eilean Dubh Chollaim, Eilean Fhionnsbhaigh, Eilean Lingreabhaigh, Eilean Mhanais, Glas Sgeir (2)
- Scalpay: Fuam an Tolla, Greineam, Raiream, Rosaigh, Stiolamair, Stiughaigh, Stiughaigh na Leum, Thamarasaigh
- Sgeotasaigh: Eilean Dubh, Eilean Rainich, Sgeir Ghlas
- Stockinish: Eilean Leasait, Eilean nan Eun

=== Shiant Islands ===
- Eilean Mhuire: Seann Chaisteal
- Garbh Eilean: Sgeir Mianais
  - The Galtachan: Bodach, Damhag, Galta Beag, Galta Mòr, Stacan Laidir, Sgeir Mhic a' Ghobha

=== Lewis ===
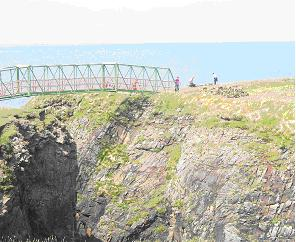
The bridge connecting Dùn Èistean to Lewis

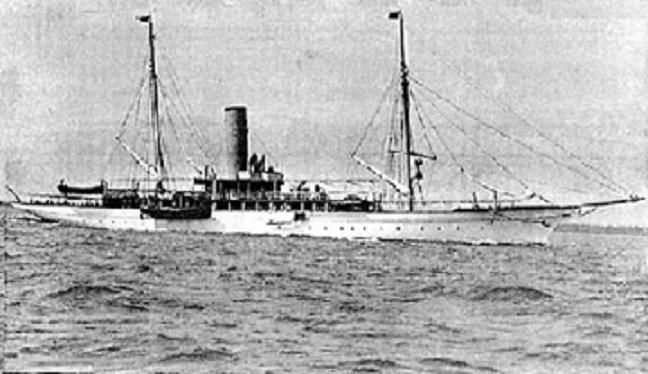
Admiralty yacht Iolaire, sunk with the loss of 205 lives on the Beasts of Holm skerries near the entrance to Stornoway harbour in 1919.

==== South west coast ====
Ceann Loch Resort to Aird Dhrolaige: Liongam, Staca Liath

- Aird Dhrolaige to Camas Uig: Eilean Molach, Greineam, Sgeir an Tamna, Sgeir Liath, Staca Leathann
- Camas Uig: Fraoch Eilean, Leac Holm, Sarah's Island, Sgeir a' Chàis, Sgeir Liath, Sgeir Sheilibhig, Tom, Tolm
- Camas Uig to Gallan Head: Gallan Beg, Sgeir Fiabhaig Tarras, Sgeir Gallan
- Eilean Mhealasta: Hairsgeir Beag, Hairsgeir Mòr

==== Loch Ròg ====
- Loch Ròg:
  - Loch Ceann Hulabhig: Eilean Trosdam, Eilean Orasaigh, Eilean an Tighe, Eimisgeir
  - Loch Charlabhaigh: Eilean Bhinndealaim
  - Loch Ròg Beag: Eilean Dubh, Eileanan Glasa
  - Loch Shiadair: Crovag
- Ceabhaigh: Greinam, Sgeir nan Cliabh
- Eilean Chearstaidh: Bratanais Mòr, Eilean Sgarastaigh
- Flodaigh: Gousam
- Fuaigh Beag: Aird Orasaigh, Cliatasaigh, Eilean nam Feannag, Floday, Geile Sgeir, Garbh Eilean, Glas Eilean, Linngeam
- Fuaigh Mòr: EileanTeinis, Eunaigh Beag, Eunaigh Mòr, Geile Sgeir, Sgeir Dubh Mhòr, Sgeir Liath
- Great Bernera: Eilean Beag, Eilean Bhacasaigh, Eilean Mòr, Eilean Riosaigh, Eughlam, Greineam, Liongam Valasay
- Little Bernera: Bearasaigh, Campaigh, Cealasaigh, Cruitear, Cul Campaigh, Eilean Fir Chrothair, Flodaigh, Hairsgeir, Mas Sgier, Seanna Chnoc, Sgeir à Mhurain, Sgeir Dhearg, Sgeir na h-Aon Chaorocah.
- Pabaigh Mòr: Bogha Dubh, Mas Sgeir, Pabeigh Beag, Siaram Mòr
- Vacsay: Sgeir Bocaig, Sgeir Fail, Sgeir na h-Aon Chaorach, Trathasam

==== North west coast ====
- Aird Laimisiadair to Butt of Lewis: Buistean, Cleite Gile, Cul Chraigeam, Craigeam, Dubh Sgeir, Eilean Arnol, Lith Sgeir, Mas Sgeir, Sgeir Dhail, Sgeir Dhearg Cul Chraigeam, Sgeir Lainganish, Sgeir Mhòr, Stac à Phris

==== East Coast ====
The location of the Butt of Lewis
- Butt of Lewis to Tolsta Head: Am Braga, Braighe Mhòr, Dùn Èistean, Dun Eoradail, Eilean Glas, Mas Sgeir
- Tolsta Head to Tiumpan Head: Heisgeir, Lada Sgeir, Langasgeir Mòr, Sgeir Leathann
- Tiumpan Head to Rubha Raerinis: Beasts of Holm, Buaile Mhòr, Eilean à Chaise, Eilean à Chrotaich, Eilean Beag Phabail, Eilean Mòr Phabail, Eilean na Greinne, Eilean Grioda, Eilean nan Uan, Eilean Thuilm, Mol Shildinis, Sgeir Mhòr Shildinis
- Rubha Raerinis to Rubha na Creige Moire (including Loch Erisort and Loch Liurbost): Bhatarsaidh, Dun Bharclin, Eilean à Bhlair, Eilean Cheois, Eilean Glas, Eilean Miabhiag, Eilean Mòr Lacasaidh, Eilean Mhic Thormaid, Eilean Orasaigh (2), Eilean Rosaidh, Eilean Thoraidh, Garbh Eilean, Glas Sgeir, Riosaigh, Seumas Cleite, Sgeiran Arbhair, Sgeir Tanais, Stac Tabhaidh, Tabhaigh Beah, Tabhaigh Mòr, Tannaraidh
- Rubha na Creige Moire to Gob Rubha Uisnis (including Loch Sealg): Bogha Ruadh
- Gob Rubha Uisnis to Rubha Brìodog: Eilean Beag à Bhaigh, Eilean Dubh à Bhaigh, Eilean Glas na h-Acarsaid Fhalaich, Eilean Mòr à Bhaigh, Eilean Thinngartsaigh, Sgeir Mhòr Bhalamuis
- Eilean Chaluim Chille: Eilean Calabraigh, Crois Eilean, Duine, Eilean a Bhlair, Riasiagh, Sgeir nan Muirsgian, Sgeir nan Each
- Eilean Liubhaird: Sgeir Fhraoich, Sgeir nan Caorach, Stac à Bhaigh
- Seaforth Island: None

== Small archipelagos ==
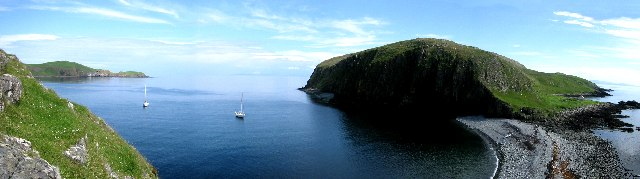
The Shiant Islands

There are various small archipelagos within the Outer Hebrides. These include:

Small archipelagoes in the Outer Hebrides
Name	Location
Barra Isles (or Bishop's Isles)	South of Barra
Flannan Isles	32 kilometres (20 mi) west of Lewis
Monach Islands	9 kilometres (5.6 mi) west of North Uist
Shiant Islands	7 kilometres (4.3 mi) southeast of Harris

The St Kilda group is 64 kilometres (40 mi) west-northwest of North Uist.

== See also ==
- History of the Outer Hebrides
- Flora and fauna of the Outer Hebrides
- Religion in the Outer Hebrides
- List of places in the Western Isles
- Inner Hebrides
  - List of Inner Hebrides
- List of Orkney islands
  - Churchill Barriers
- List of Shetland islands
- Islands of the Clyde
- Islands of the Forth
- List of islands of Scotland
- List of islands of the British Isles
- North Sea islands
- Rockall
