= Sursaigh =

Island off North Uist in the Sound of Harris, Scotland

Sursaigh (Gaelic)

Location
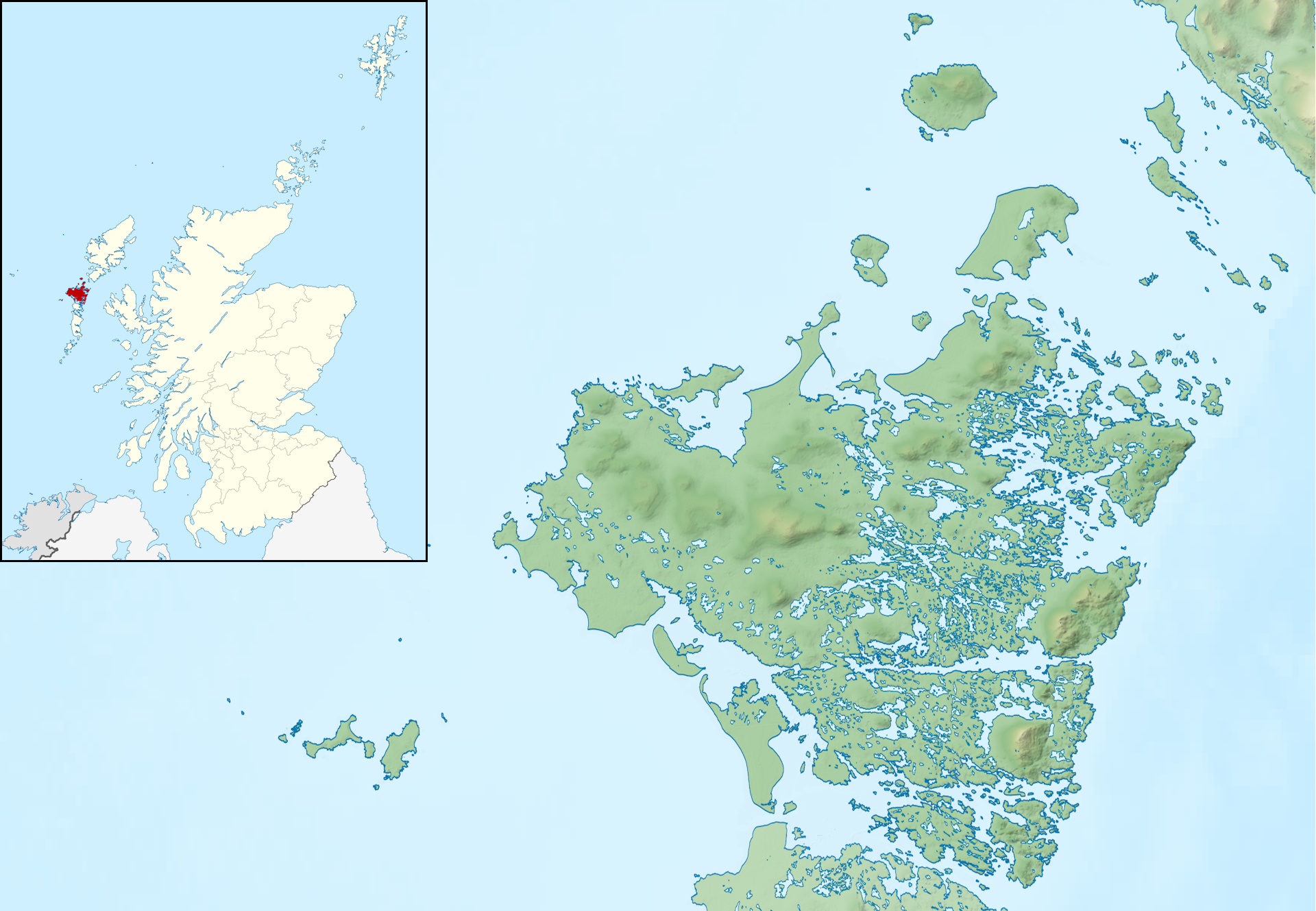
- Sursaigh shown next to North Uist Sursaigh shown within the Outer Hebrides
- OS grid reference: NF957760
- Coordinates: 57.673°N 7.105°W

Name
- Name meaning: Possibly Old Norse for 'sour island'.

Physical geography
- Island group: Uists and Barra
- Area: 30 ha (74 acres)
- Area rank: 247
- Highest elevation: 27 m (89 ft)

Administration
- Council area: Na h-Eileanan Siar
- Country: Scotland
- Sovereign state: United Kingdom

Demographics
- Population: 0

Sursaigh (Scottish Gaelic: Sursaigh) is an island off North Uist in the Sound of Harris, Scotland. It lies 8 kilometres (5.0 mi) northeast of the village of Lochmaddy and there are numerous nearby islands including Stromay, Sgarabhaigh and Tahay.

The island has "a patchy cover of glacial deposits."

Airigh na h-Aon Oidhche (one-night shieling) is a ruined hut on the south side of the island. It is said that in the late 19th century a shepherd who was staying on the island was awakened by the sound of gulls and his frightened dog. Rushing outside he saw "an enormous cartwheel in the sky making a strange noise". He fled the island and never returned.

== See also ==
- List of Outer Hebrides
