= Tahay =

Tahay may refer to:

- Gliese 367 b, an exoplanet
- Taghaigh, an island in Scotland
