= Wiay =

Wiay is the name of two uninhabited islands in the Hebrides, off the west coast of Scotland.

- Wiay, Inner Hebrides, of Skye
- Wiay, Outer Hebrides, of the Uists
