= Eileanan Chearabhaigh =

Tidal islands of Scotland

Eileanan Chearabhaigh (Gaelic)
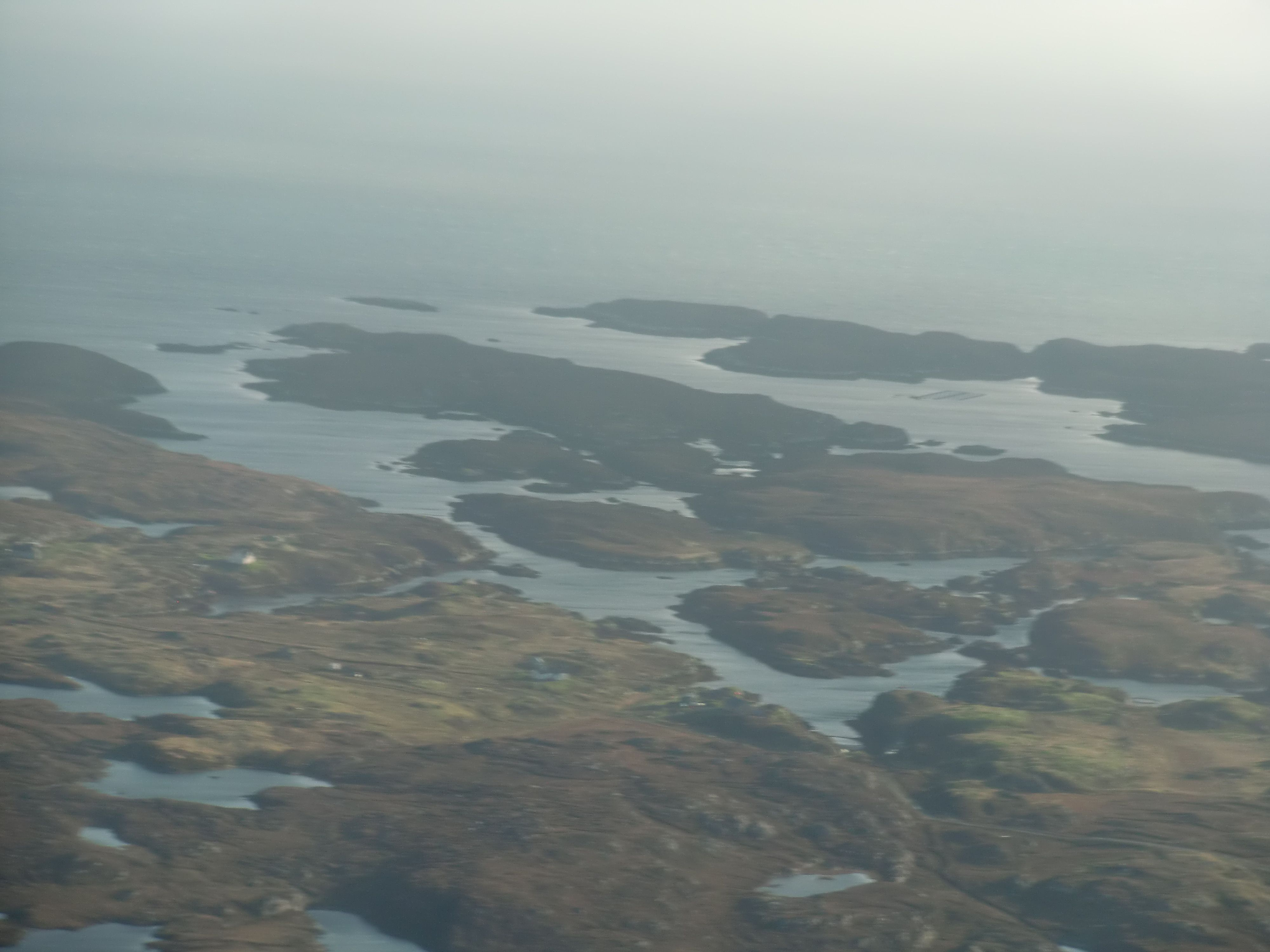
- The islands of Eileanan Chearabhaigh at centre, with mainland Benbecula in the foreground and the northern tip of Wiay beyond

Location
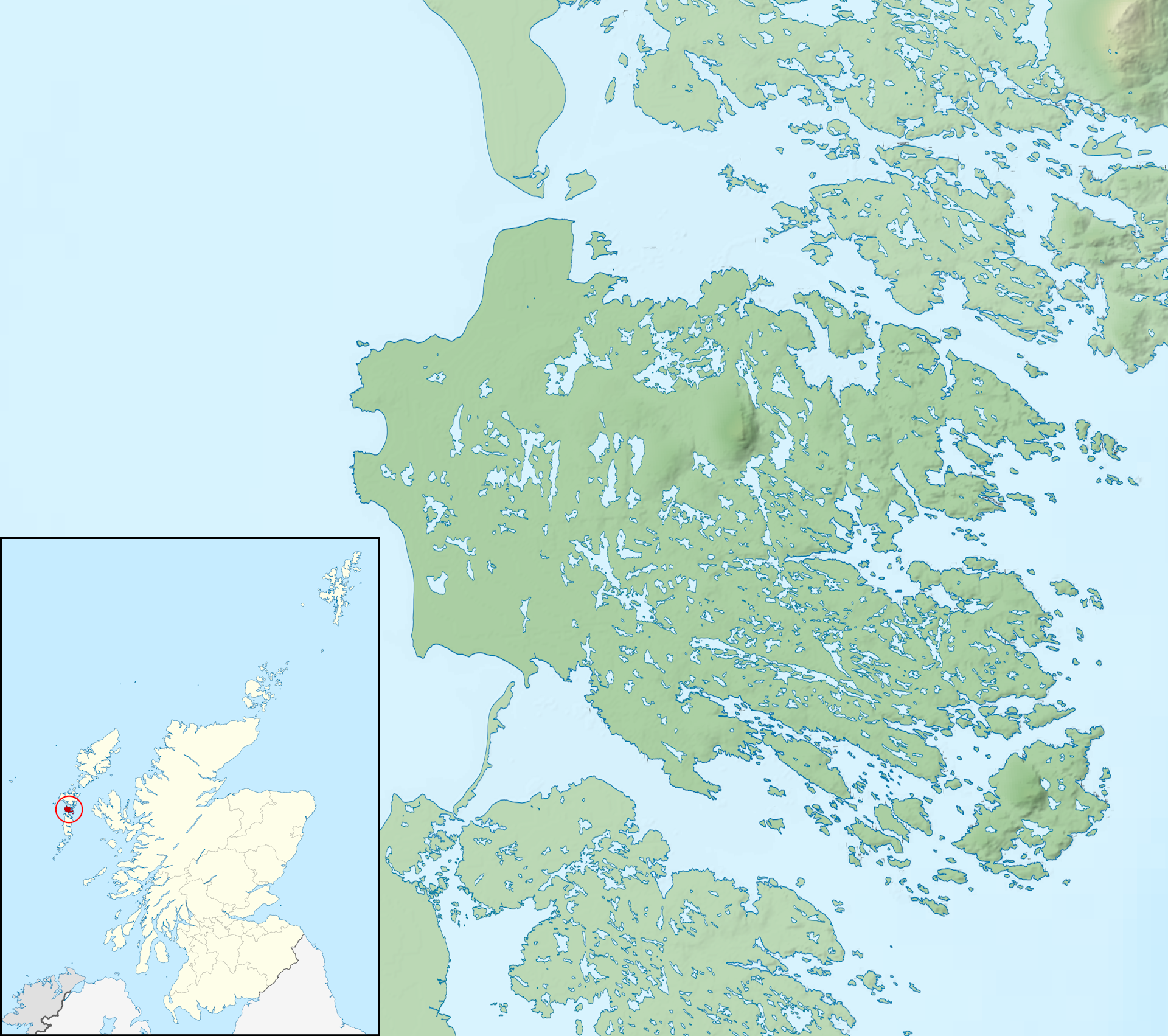
- Eileanan Chearbhaigh shown next to Benbecula Eileanan Chearbhaigh shown within the Outer Hebrides
- OS grid reference: NF866476
- Coordinates: 57.41°N 7.22°W

Physical geography
- Island group: Uist
- Area: 49 ha (120 acres)
- Highest elevation: c. 23 m (75 ft)

Administration
- Council area: Comhairle nan Eilean Siar
- Country: Scotland
- Sovereign state: United Kingdom

Eileanan Chearabhaigh is a collection of small uninhabited tidal islands off the south east coast of Benbecula in the Outer Hebrides of Scotland. The English language name Keiravagh Islands is sometimes used.

Bounded by the tidal waters of Loch Chearabhaigh to the north and Loch a' Laip to the south, the land area of the group defies a simple description. At low tide the islands form a peninsula with a total area of about 50 hectares (120 acres), which is connected to Benbecula by drying sands. At high tide the connection to Benbecula is lost and a number of small islets stretching for over two kilometres (1 1/4 mi) from east to west appear, the largest of which is about 31 hectares (77 acres) in extent. (Note: Haswell-Smith (2004) lists all the islands of Scotland that are greater in size than 40 hectares (99 acres). The definition he uses is "an Island is a piece of land or group of pieces of land which is entirely surrounded by water at Lowest Astronomical Tide and to which there is no permanent means of dry access". This therefore excludes Eileanan Chearabhaigh at low tide and also its largest constituent island at high tide (as it is less than 40 ha in extent).) None of these individual islets are named by the Ordnance Survey. Argyll Yacht Charters supply a table of islands statistics that list the "Kiervagh islands" as being 49 hectares (120 acres) in extent, although the method of measurement is not explicit.

The uninhabited island of Wiay lies to the south and fish farming is undertaken in the productive waters of Loch a' Laip and Loch Chearabhaigh. Loch a' Laip also provides shelter for visiting water craft but the area is strewn with rocks and skerries. There is a pier on Benbecula served by a track at the western end of Eileanan Chearabhaigh and another to the south at Eilean na Cille, although their use without local knowledge is not advised.

== See also ==
Nearby islands with a similarly complex geography:

- Ceallasaigh Mòr
- Eileanan Iasgaich
