= Grimsay (South East Benbecula) =

Tidal island of the Outer Hebrides south east of Benbecula

Griomasaigh (Gaelic)

Location
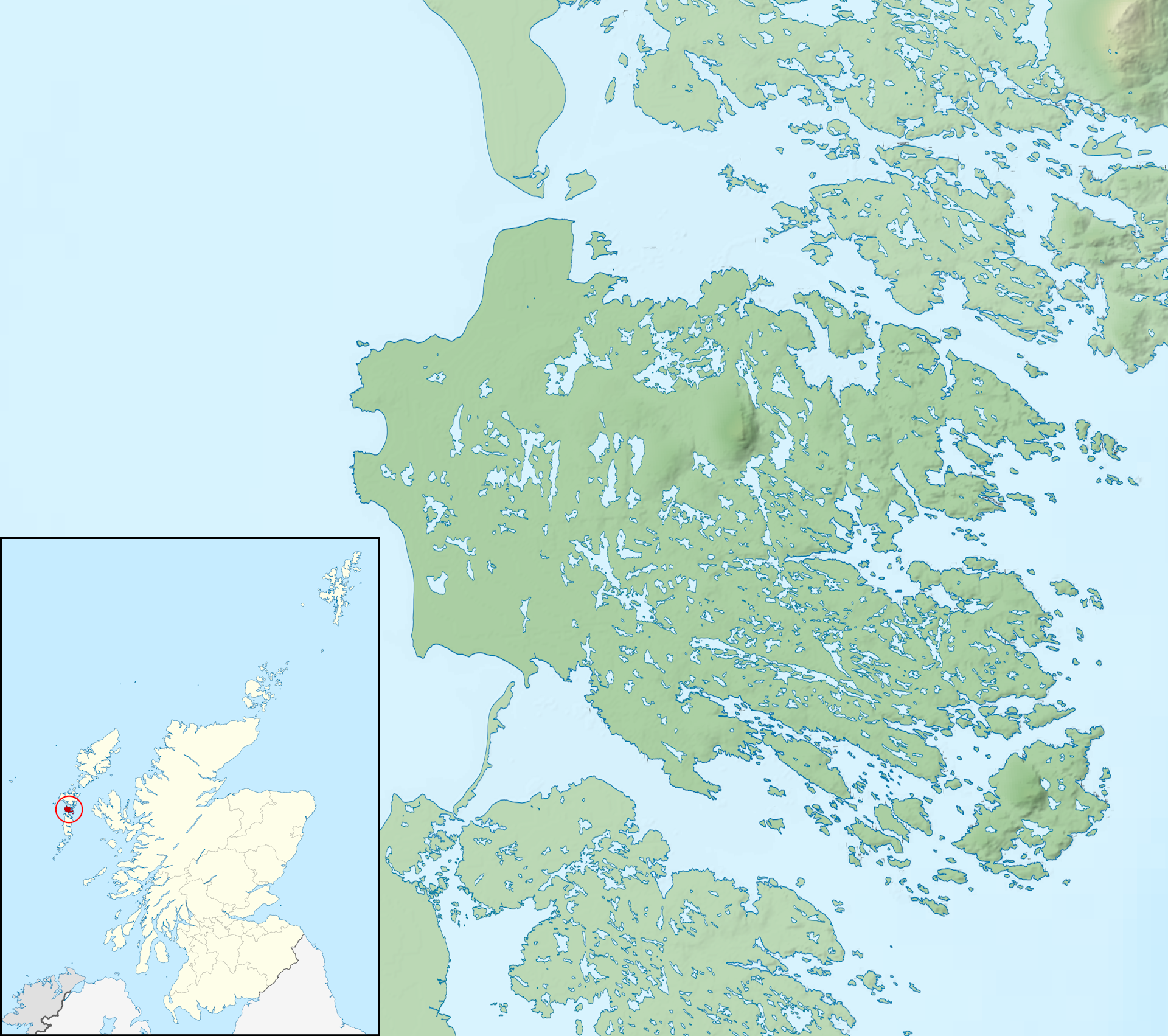
- Grimsay shown next to Benbecula Grimsay shown within the Outer Hebrides
- OS grid reference: NF831473
- Coordinates: 57.41°N 7.28°W

Name
- Name meaning: "Grim's island", from Norse
- Old Norse name: Grímsey

Physical geography
- Island group: Uist and Barra
- Area: 117 ha (0.45 sq mi)
- Area rank: 142
- Highest elevation: 20 m (66 ft)

Administration
- Council area: Na h-Eileanan Siar
- Country: Scotland
- Sovereign state: United Kingdom

Demographics
- Population: 27
- Population rank: 58
- Population density: 23 people/km^{2}

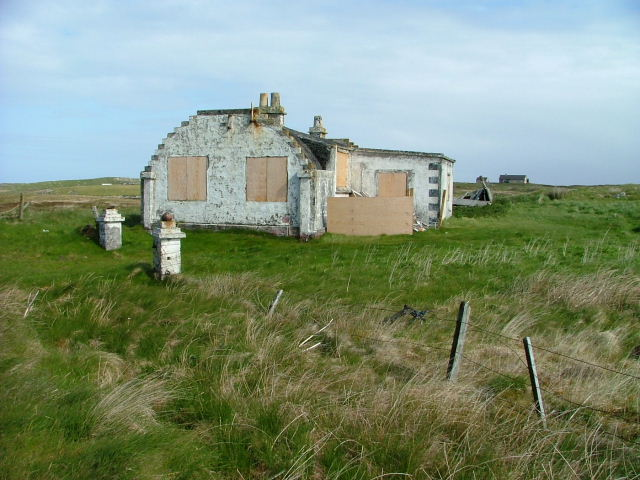
An unusual abandoned building on Grimsay

Grimsay, south east of Benbecula is a tidal island of the Outer Hebrides. It is connected to Benbecula by a causeway which carries the B891. In the 2001 census, Grimsay had a population of 19, 20 in 2011 and 27 in 2002.

An extension to the B891 now connects Grimsay to Eilean na Cille to the south east via a causeway. The road was built at a cost of £1,800 to service the pier at Peter's Port, which was constructed in 1896 at cost of £2,000 – although the anchorage is awkward and use by people without local knowledge is discouraged.

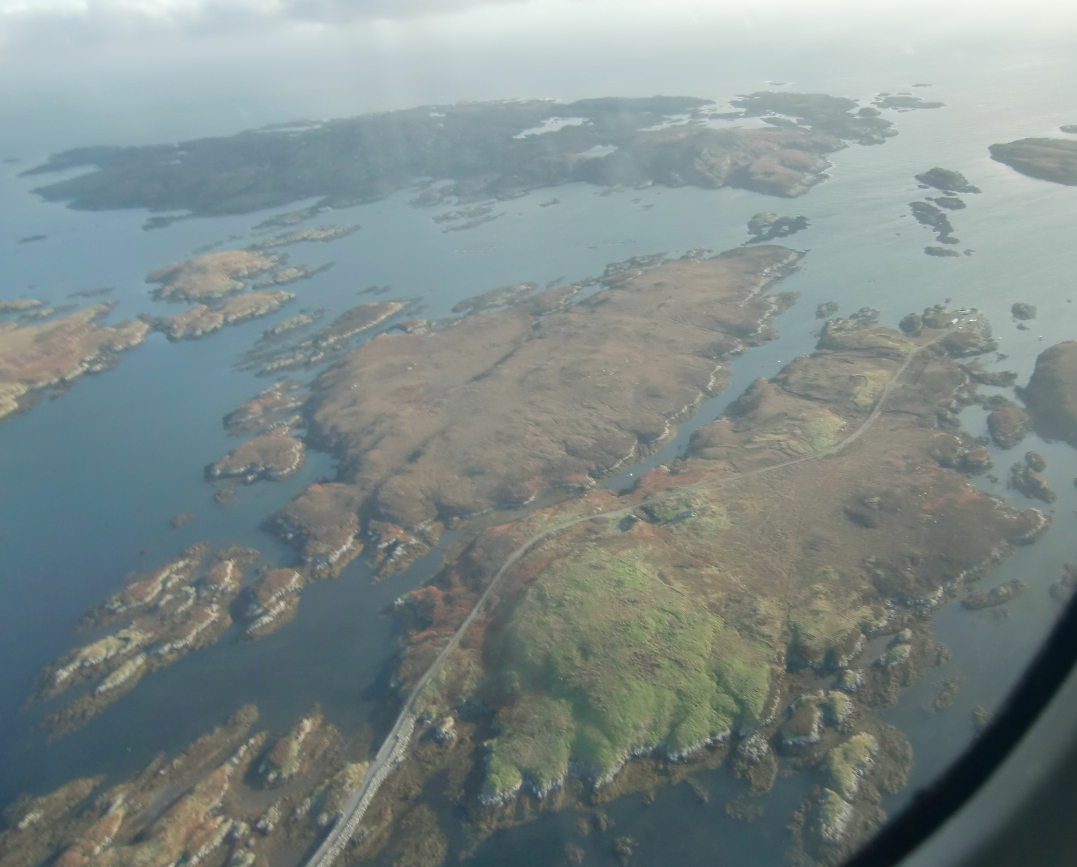
Eilean na Cille, Triallabreac and Wiay east of Grimsay from the air, with Peter's Port at right
