= Stromay =

Tidal island off North Uist in the Sound of Harris, Scotland

Sròmaigh (Gaelic)

Location
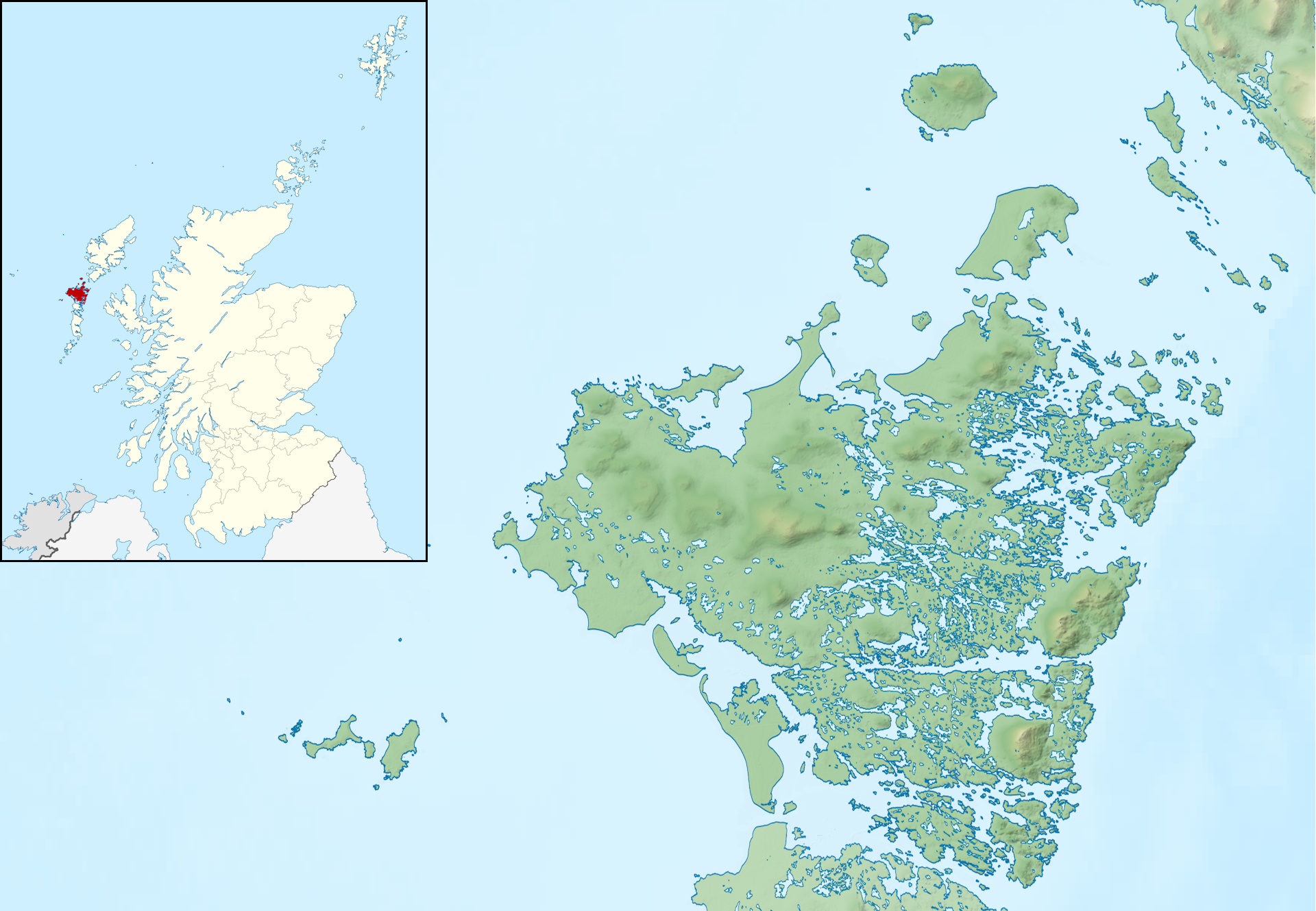
- Stromay shown next to North Uist Stromay shown within the Outer Hebrides
- OS grid reference: NF936746
- Coordinates: 57.657°N 7.138°W

Name
- Name meaning: Old Norse for 'island in the tidal stream'.
- Old Norse name: Straum-øy

Physical geography
- Island group: Uists and Barra
- Area: 66 ha (163 acres)
- Area rank: 178
- Highest elevation: 16 m (52 ft)

Administration
- Council area: Na h-Eileanan Siar
- Country: Scotland
- Sovereign state: United Kingdom

Demographics
- Population: 0

Stromay (Scottish Gaelic: Sròmaigh) is a tidal island off North Uist in the Sound of Harris, Scotland.

The low island of Stromay lies between two wide, shallow sea lochs, Loch Mhic Phàil and Loch Aulasary. Stromay is joined to North Uist for most of the tidal cycle.

A smaller islet of the same name lies between Harris and Ensay, and another (Stròmaigh) between North Uist and Kirkibost.

There are extensive sands and rocks offshore that are exposed at low tide.

== See also ==
- List of Outer Hebrides

== Footnotes ==
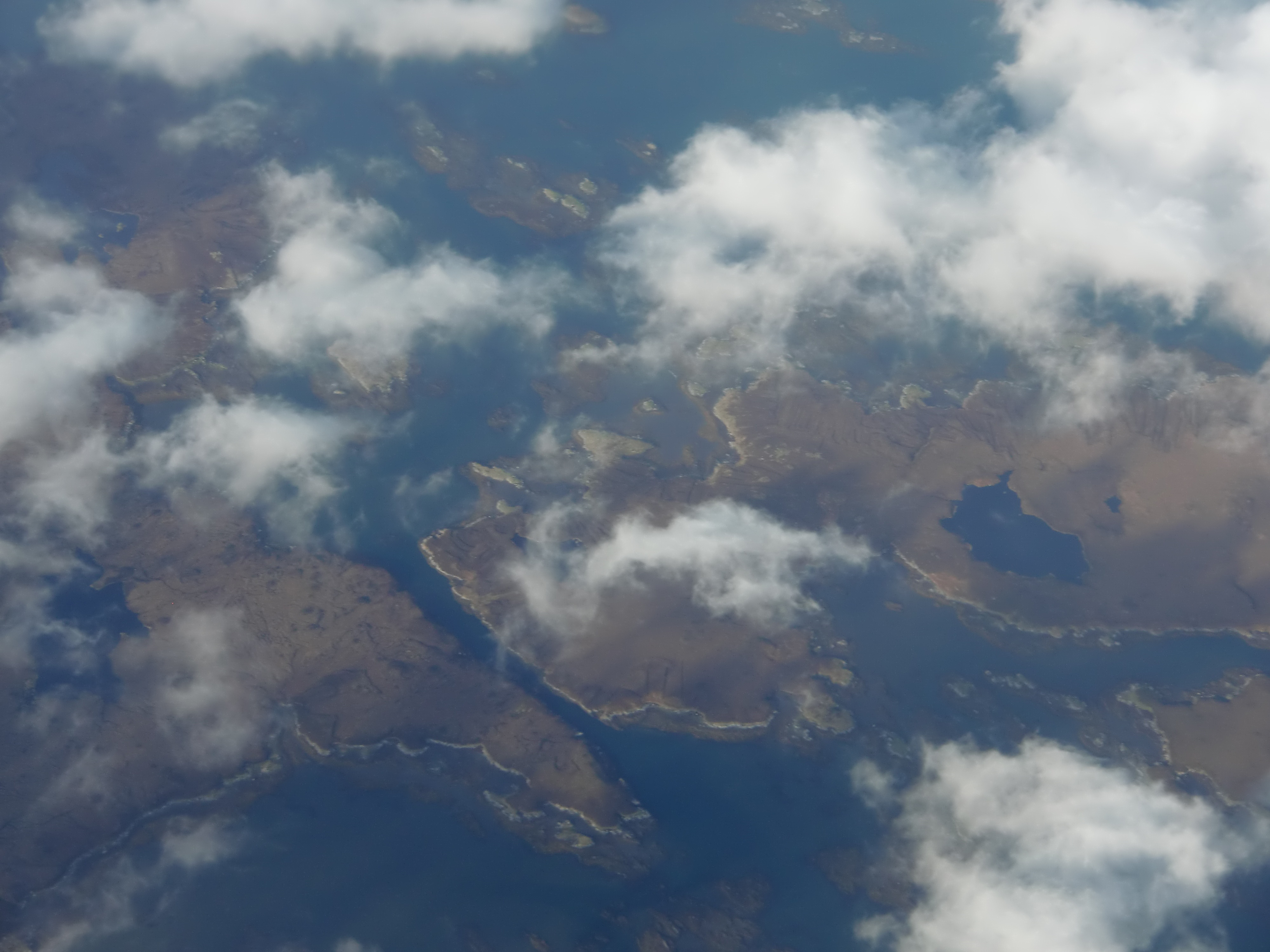
Stromay from the air, looking west. The narrow channel of Sruth Beag between Stromay and North Uist is at centre
