= Eilean Liubhaird =

Island in the Outer Hebrides, Scotland

Eilean Liubhaird (Gaelic)

Location
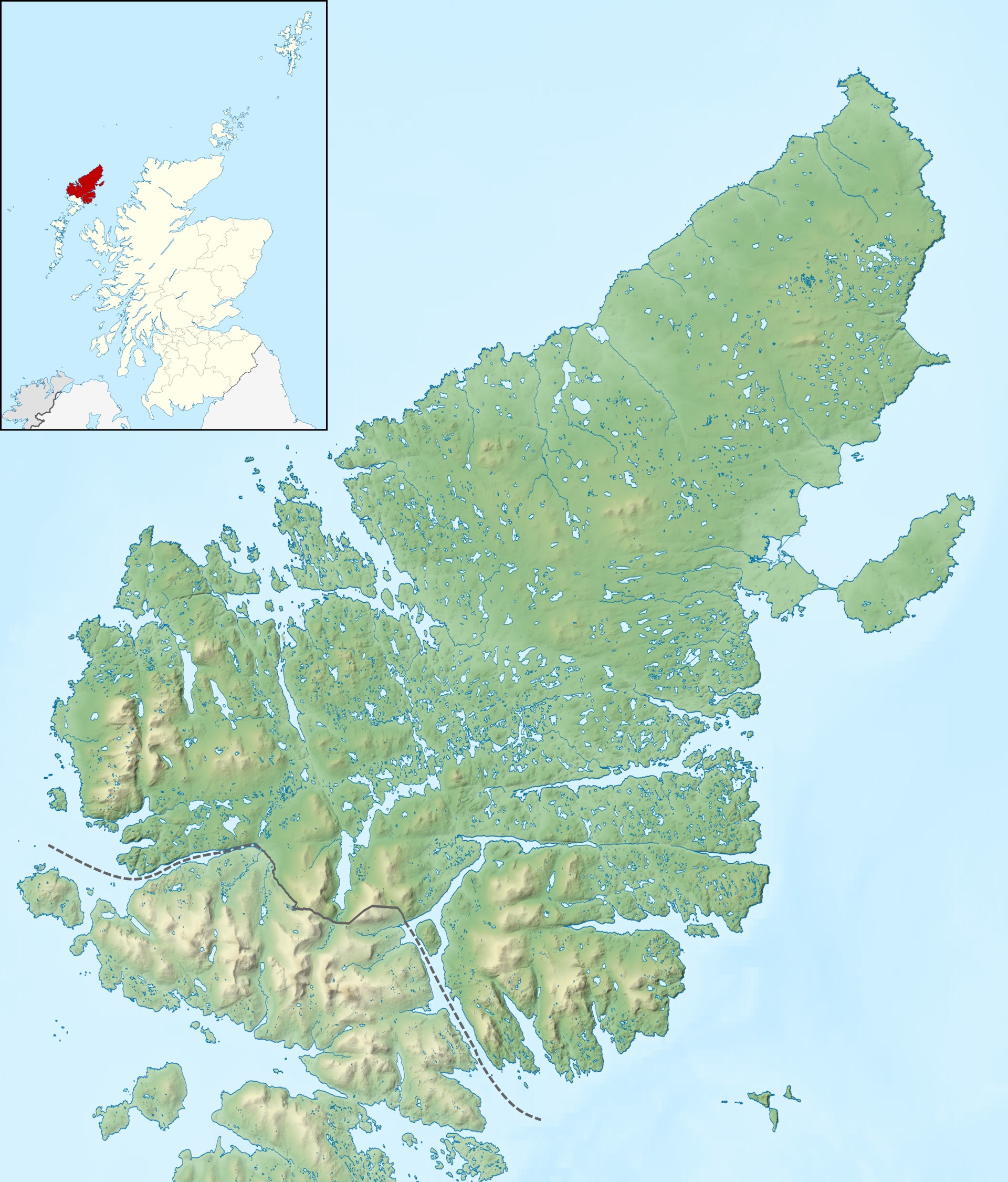
- Eilean Liubhaird shown next to Lewis Eilean Liubhaird shown within the Outer Hebrides
- OS grid reference: NB382099
- Coordinates: 58.00°N 6.43°W

Name
- Name meaning: "yew island"

Physical geography
- Island group: Lewis and Harris
- Area: 125 ha (310 acres)
- Area rank: 133=
- Highest elevation: 76 m (249 ft)

Administration
- Council area: Na h-Eileanan Siar
- Country: Scotland
- Sovereign state: United Kingdom

Demographics
- Population: 0

Eilean Liubhaird or Eilean Iubhard is an island in the Outer Hebrides, to the east of Lewis.

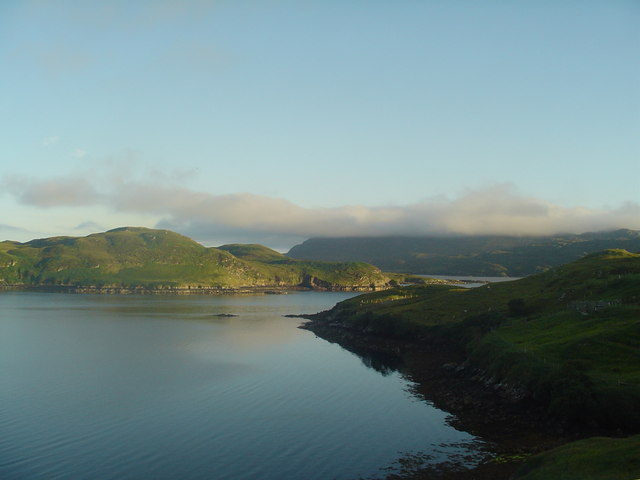
View over to Eilean Liubhaird

== Geography and geology ==
The rock is "gneiss bedrock with some basaltic intrusion".

The island is oblong in shape with several inlets on its south coast, lying on an east–west axis in Loch Sealg (Loch Shell), and shelters the harbour of Lemreway on the "mainland" of Lewis nearby.

There are two peaks at either end of the island, with the low ground in the middle. There are two lochans in the west, and three in the east as well as a number of burns.

== History ==
The placename Dùnan on the south coast may be a reference to a little fort of some antiquity.

Although Haswell-Smith suggests that the name means "yew island", the preponderance of Norse names in the Outer Hebrides suggests that the second element of "Iubhard" may be a corruption of fjord/firth.

Dean Munro visited the island in 1549, and reported "pasture and schielling of store, with faire hunting of ottars out of their bouries".

On 4 May 1746, Bonnie Prince Charlie hid on the island with some of his men for four days. Royal Navy vessels were patrolling in the Minch at the time. They camped under a sail stretched over a "low pitiful hut" while it rained torrentially.

In the early 19th century, five families were living here. Presumably they had moved there in the past few decades, as the story of the Jacobite visit mentions no inhabitants. Seanna-Bhaile (meaning the "old town") was the main settlement, and there was also the lone house known as Taigh a' Gheumpaill.
