= Eilean na Cille =

Island of the Outer Hebrides connected to Grimsay (South) by a causeway

Eilean na Cille (Gaelic)
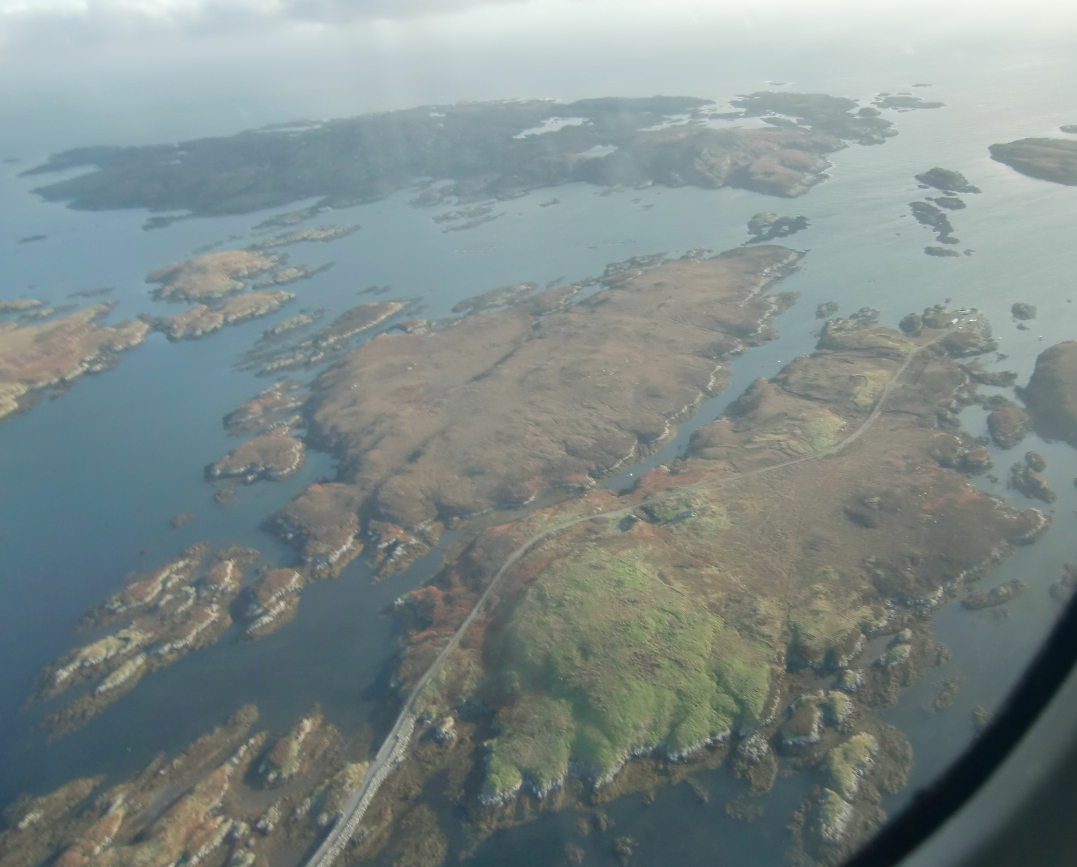
- Eilean na Cille (at right), Triallabreac and Wiay from the air

Location
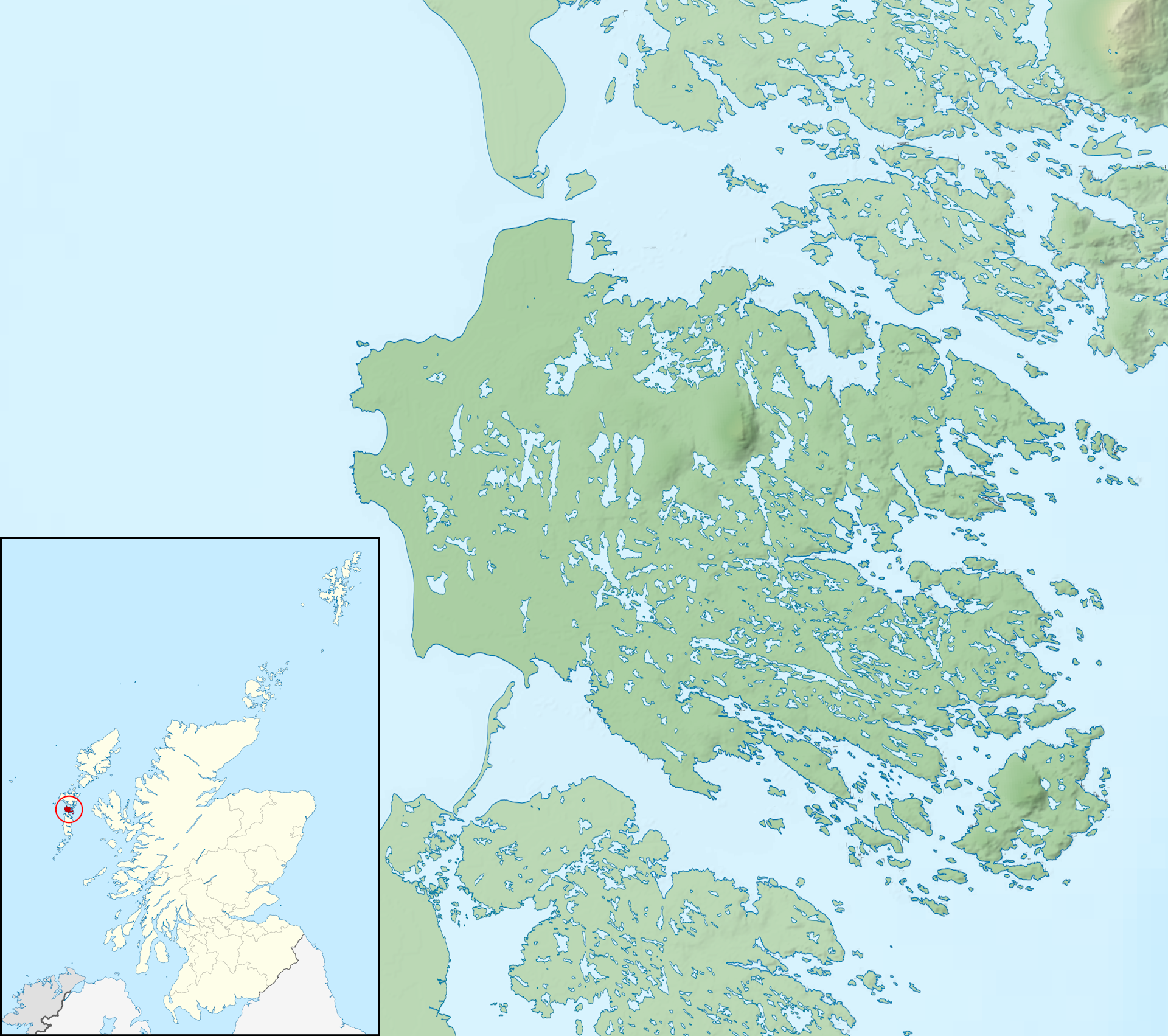
- Eilean na Cille shown next to Benbecula Eilean na Cille shown within the Outer Hebrides
- OS grid reference: NF846459
- Coordinates: 57.39°N 7.25°W

Name
- Name meaning: church island

Physical geography
- Island group: Uist and Barra
- Area: 16 hectares (40 acres)
- Highest elevation: 20 m (66 ft)

Administration
- Council area: Na h-Eileanan Siar
- Country: Scotland
- Sovereign state: United Kingdom

Eilean na Cille, south east of Benbecula is an island of the Outer Hebrides connected to Grimsay (South) by a causeway which carries the B891. The road was built to service the pier at Peter's Port, which was constructed in 1896 at cost of £2,000 – although the anchorage is awkward and should not be used without local knowledge.

Eilean na Cille is "included in the NRS statistical geography for inhabited islands but had no usual residents at the time of either the 2001 or 2011 censuses".
