= Shillay =

Uninhabited island in the Outer Hebrides of Scotland

Siolaigh (Gaelic)

Location
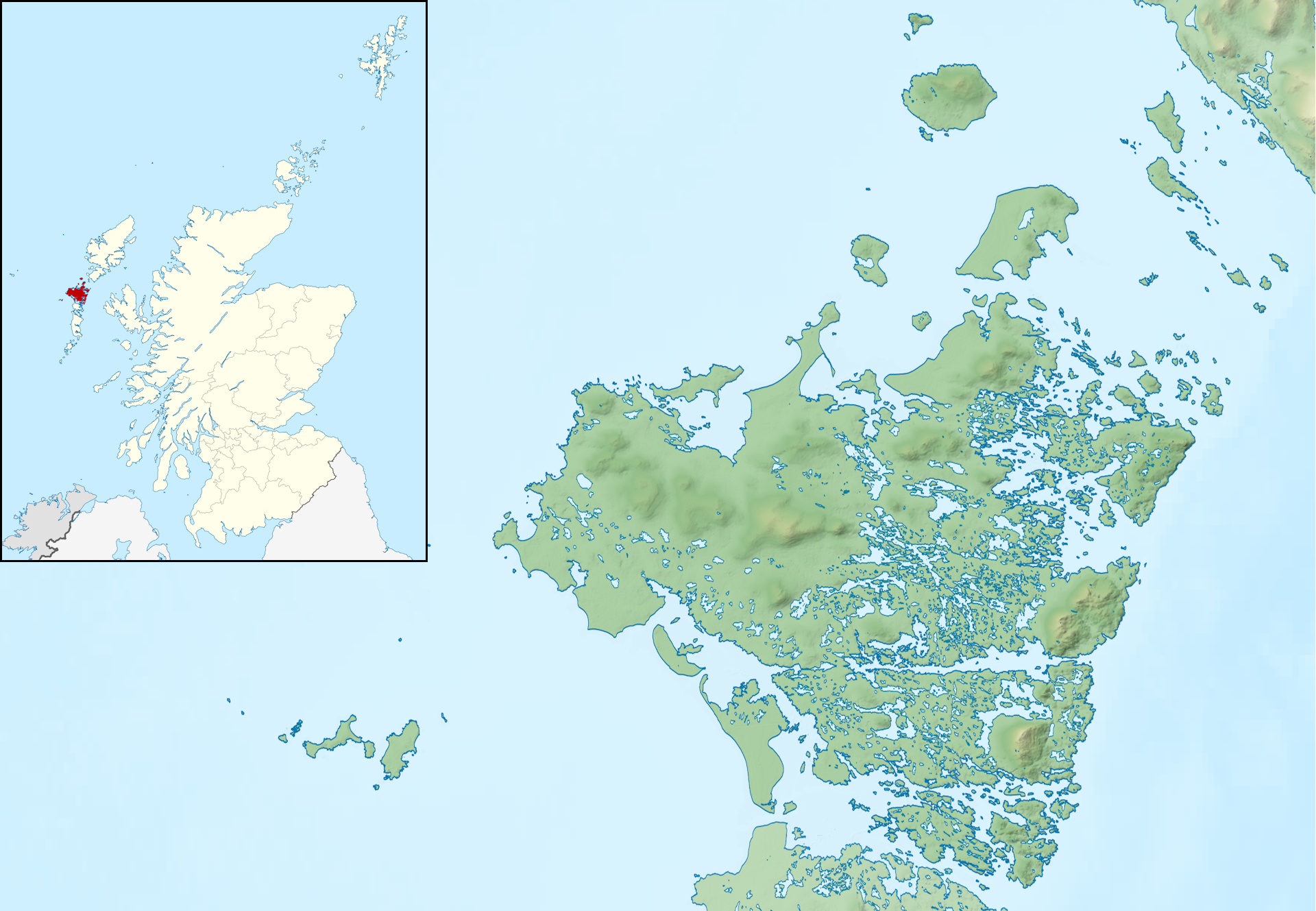
- Shillay shown next to North Uist Shillay shown within the Outer Hebrides
- OS grid reference: NF880913
- Coordinates: 57.80°N 7.25°W

Name
- Name meaning: seal island
- Old Norse name: selr-øy

Physical geography
- Island group: Lewis and Harris
- Area: 47 ha (120 acres)
- Area rank: 208
- Highest elevation: 79 m (259 ft)

Administration
- Council area: Na h-Eileanan Siar
- Country: Scotland
- Sovereign state: United Kingdom

Demographics
- Population: 0

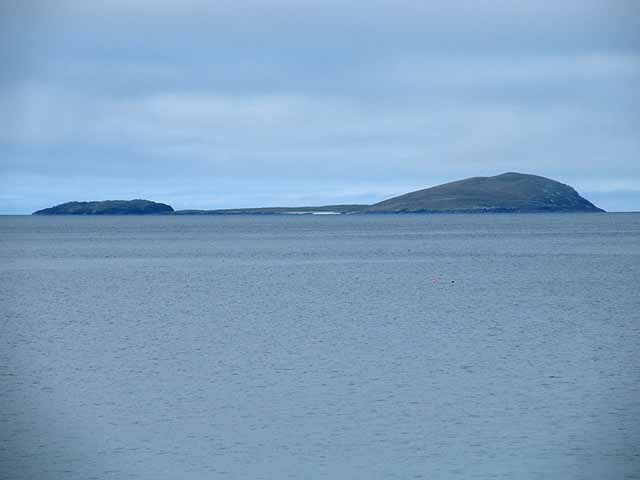

Shillay (Scottish Gaelic: Siolaigh) is an uninhabited island which lies 2 km north of Pabbay in the Outer Hebrides of Scotland.

The name is derived from the Norse selr-øy meaning seal island and is a Scottish Wildlife Trust reserve owing to its international importance for breeding grey seals.

There is no record or evidence that it has ever seen human habitation.
