= Ceabhaigh =

Island of the Outer Hebrides, Scotland

Ceabhaigh (Gaelic)
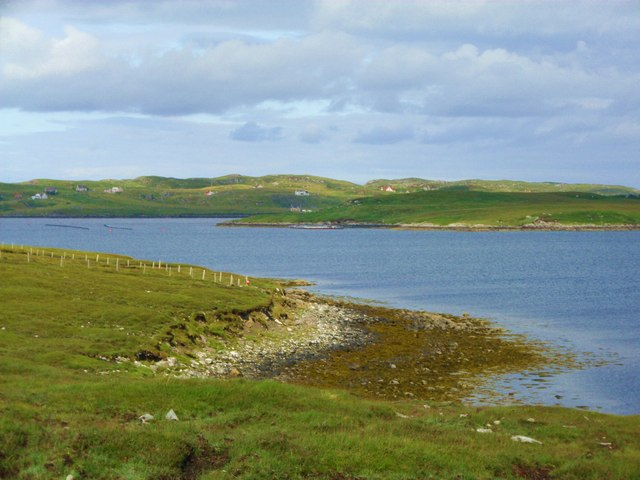

Location
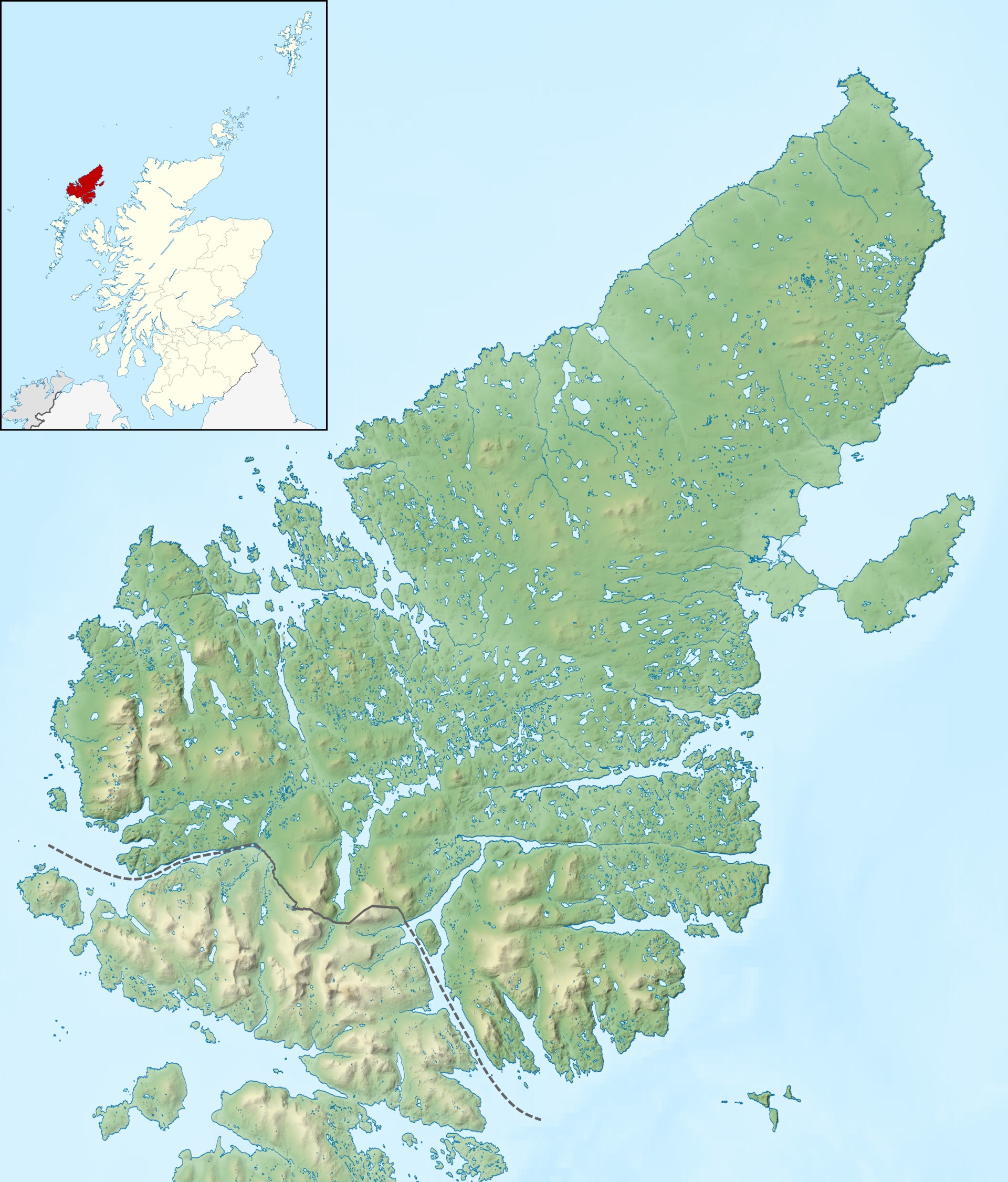
- Ceabhaigh shown next to Lewis Ceabhaigh shown within the Outer Hebrides
- OS grid reference: NB196351
- Coordinates: 58.2°N 6.75°W

Physical geography
- Island group: Lewis and Harris
- Area: 25 ha
- Highest elevation: 20 m (66 ft)

Administration
- Council area: Western Isles
- Country: Scotland
- Sovereign state: United Kingdom

Demographics
- Population: Uninhabited

Ceabhaigh is a small island in an arm of Loch Ròg on the west coast of Lewis in the Outer Hebrides of Scotland. It is about 25 hectares (62 acres) in extent. It is not known if the island was ever permanently inhabited.

It lies in Loch Ròg nan Ear (West Loch Roag) between the mainland village of Breasclete and the larger island of Great Bernera and just north of Eilean Chearstaidh. The little skerry of Sgeir nan Cleibh lies just to the north.
