= Eileanan Iasgaich =

Eileanan Iasgaich Mòr (Gaelic)

Location
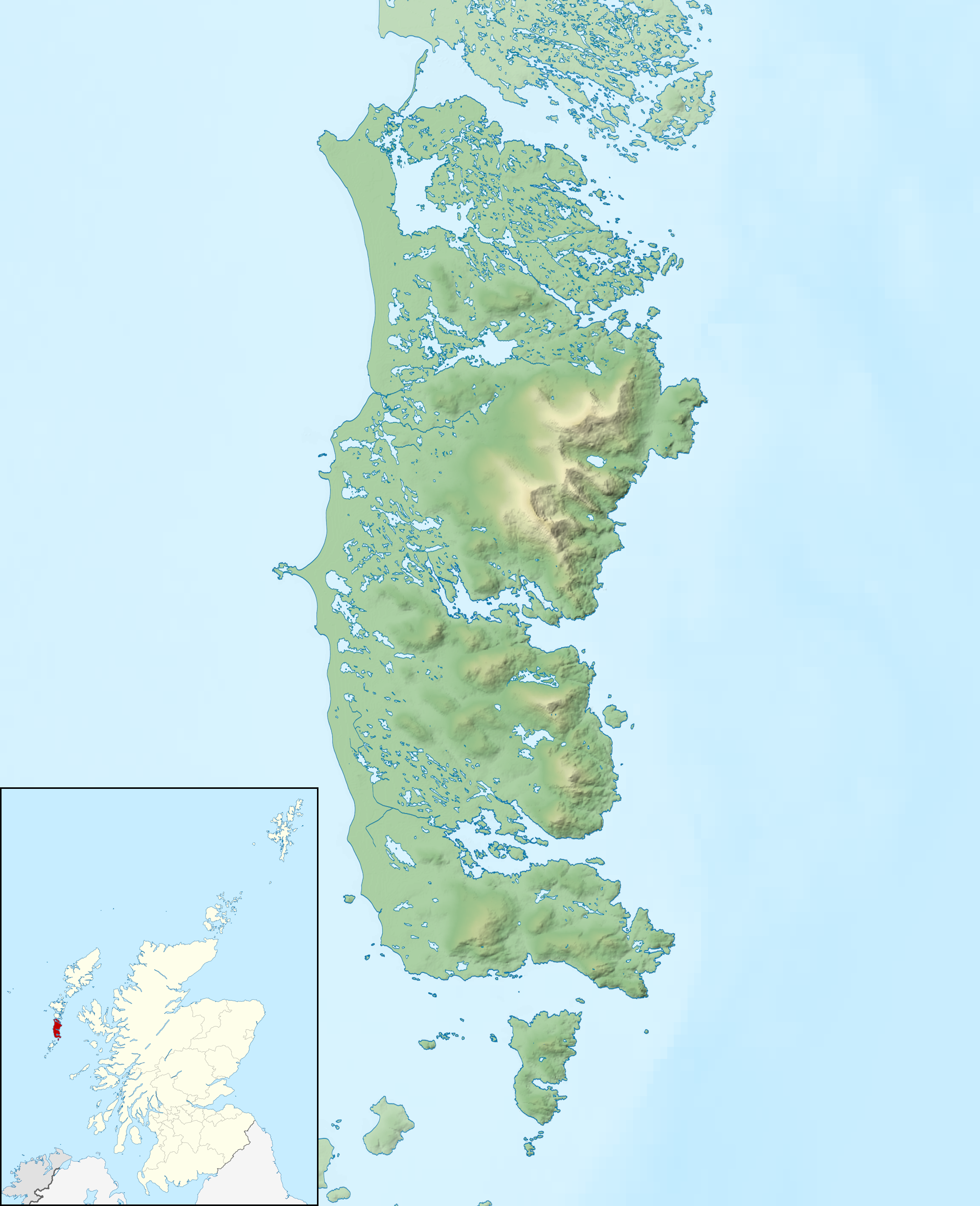
- Eileanan Iasgaich shown next to South Uist Eileanan Iasgaich shown within the Outer Hebrides
- OS grid reference: NF789184
- Coordinates: 57.14°N 7.31°W

Name
- Name meaning: fishing island

Physical geography
- Island group: Uists & Barra
- Area: 50 ha (120 acres)
- Area rank: 199=
- Highest elevation: 20 m (66 ft)

Administration
- Council area: Na h-Eileanan Siar
- Country: Scotland
- Sovereign state: United Kingdom

Demographics
- Population: 0
- References: >

Na h-Eileanan Iasgaich comprise a small uninhabited archipelago in Loch Boisdale, in the south east of the island of South Uist, in the Outer Hebrides, Scotland. The individual islands are separated from one another at high tide, but connected to one another at low tide, (although not to their much larger neighbour of South Uist). They are around 50 ha in extent and over 20m at their highest point. Their boundaries are ill-defined.

== Geography and geology ==
The islands have a thin soil and a Lewisian gneiss bedrock.

Their name means "fishing islands" in Scottish Gaelic because they increase greatly in size at low tide, creating a number of fish traps and homes for edible crustaceans.

There are five main islands in the group -

- Eilean Iasgaich Mòr — Great fishing island
- Eilean Iasgaich Meadhonach — Middling fishing island
- Eilean Iasgaich Beag — Little fishing island
- Eilean nam Feannag
- Eilean Bàgh Mhic Rois.
