= Taghaigh =

Island in the Outer Hebrides, Scotland

Taghaigh (Gaelic)
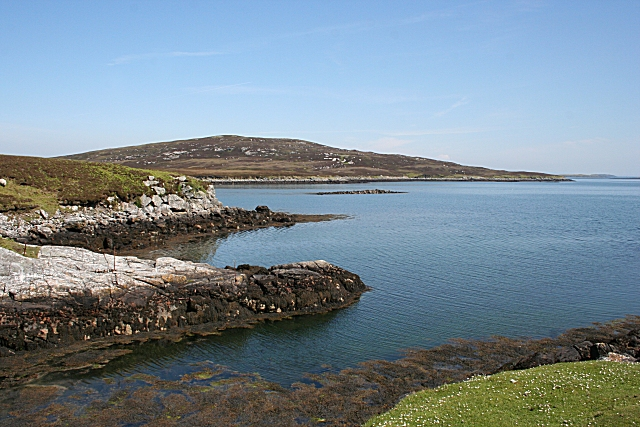

Location
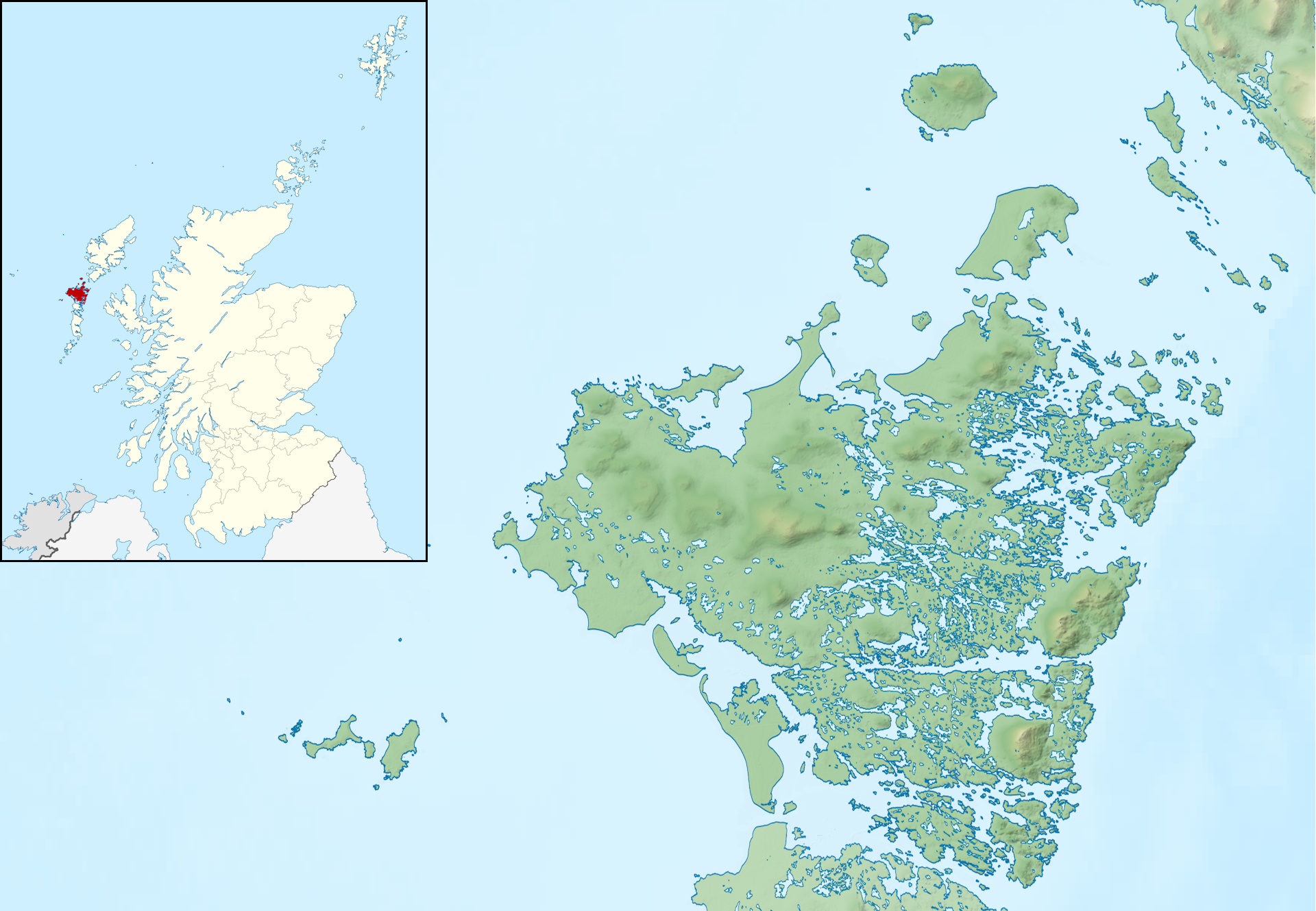
- Tahay shown next to North Uist Tahay shown within the Outer Hebrides
- OS grid reference: NF965755
- Coordinates: 57.67°N 7.09°W

Name
- Name meaning: island with a prominent hill
- Old Norse name: Tagg-øy

Physical geography
- Island group: Uists & Barra
- Area: 53 ha (130 acres)
- Area rank: 196=
- Highest elevation: 65 m (213 ft)

Administration
- Council area: Na h-Eileanan Siar
- Country: Scotland
- Sovereign state: United Kingdom

Demographics
- Population: 0

Taghaigh, also known as Tahay, is an island in the Outer Hebrides of Scotland. The name originates from the Old Norse tagg-øy meaning island with a prominent hill. At 53 hectares (130 acres) in area and with a central peak of 65 metres (213 ft), it is the largest of the group of uninhabited islands off the north east coast of North Uist.

The island is used for sheep grazing and peat cutting.

== History ==
In 1846, six families who had been evicted from their homes on Pabbay to make way for sheep, moved to the previously uninhabited island of Tahay. Although the island has no arable land, they hoped to make a living from fishing. However this proved too hard and they gave up the struggle in the 1850s and emigrated to Australia.

Tahay is owned by the Scottish Government.
