= Wiay, Outer Hebrides =

Island of the Outer Hebrides, Scotland

Wiay
Bhuia/Fuidheigh (Gaelic)

Location
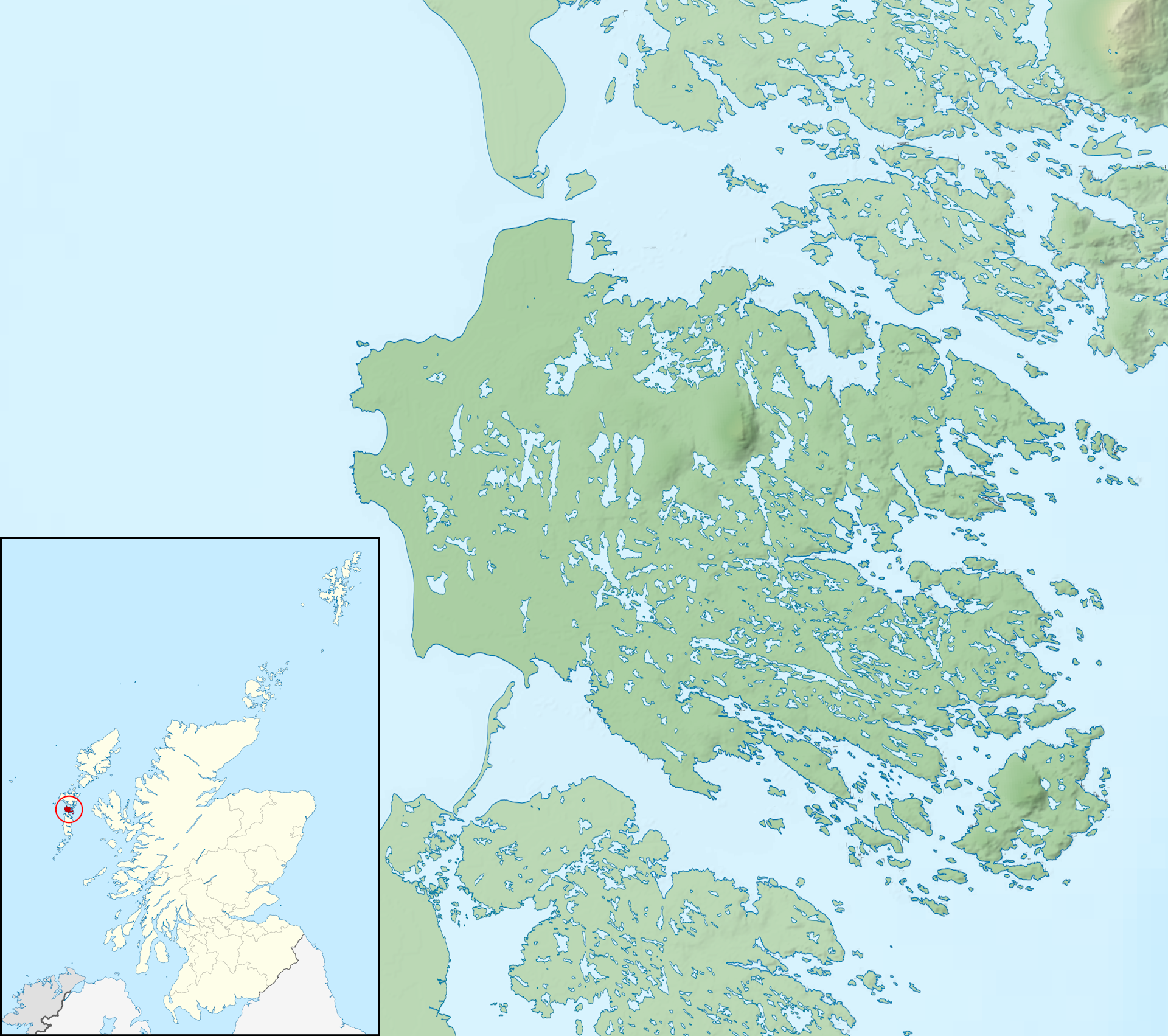
- Wiay shown next to Benbecula Wiay shown within the Outer Hebrides
- OS grid reference: NF873459
- Coordinates: 57.401°N 7.203°W

Physical geography
- Island group: Outer Hebrides
- Area: 375 ha (927 acres)
- Area rank: 78=
- Highest elevation: Beinn a' Tuath 102 m (335 ft)

Administration
- Council area: Na h-Eileanan Siar
- Country: Scotland
- Sovereign state: United Kingdom

Demographics
- Population: 0

Wiay (Scottish Gaelic: Bhuia or Fuidheigh) is an uninhabited island in the Outer Hebrides.

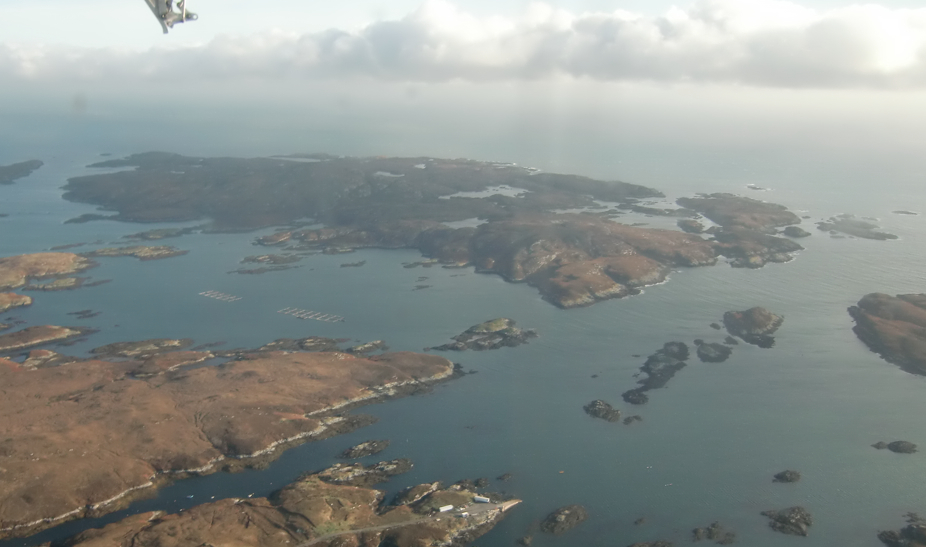
Wiay from the air with Peter's Port on Eilean na Cille in the foreground

It lies south-east of Benbecula and measures approximately 375 hectares (927 acres). The island is very flat with fertile ground and sandy beaches to the west whilst the east is predominantly peat moorland with a rocky coastline incorporating many small islands and inlets. The highest point on the island is Beinn a’ Tuath which rises to 102 m (335 ft). On the west side of the island are the ruins of an old cottage overlooking Bagh na Murla. The Eileanan Chearabhaigh lie to the north beyond Loch a' Laip.

In the 18th century Bonnie Prince Charlie is said to have hidden in a cave on the island after the Battle of Culloden. The cave, known as Prince Charlie's Rest, is found to the east of the island at the foot of Beinn a Tuath and has clear views over the Minch and to Skye.

Wiay was reported to have six inhabitants in 1861, but has been deserted since 1901.

In 2013 the island was put up for sale at a reported price of £500,000.
