= Sound of Harris =

Channel between Harris and North Uist in the Outer Hebrides of Scotland

Coordinates: 57°44′N 7°7′W

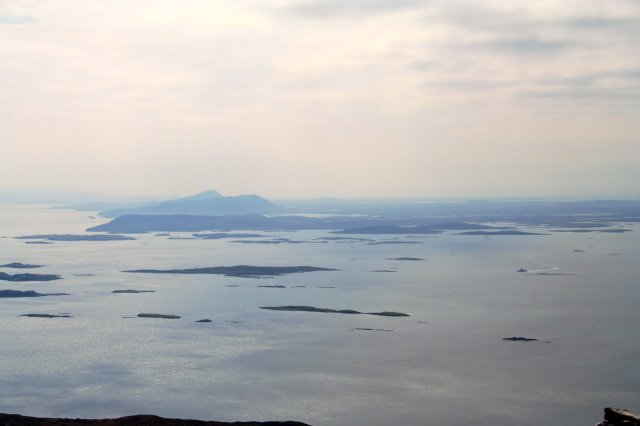
Sound of Harris

The Sound of Harris (Scottish Gaelic: Caolas na Hearadh) is a channel between the islands of Harris and North Uist in the Outer Hebrides of Scotland.

== Geography ==
Approximately eight nautical miles (fifteen kilometres) in width, the Sound of Harris provides the main sea passage through the Hebridean archipelago, from the Atlantic Ocean to The Minch. There are many islands and numerous reefs in the Sound, the largest being Berneray, Pabbay, Ensay and Killegray. It is part of the South Lewis, Harris and North Uist National Scenic Area, one of 40 in Scotland.

== Ferry ==
Since 1996, a vehicle ferry links Leverburgh, Harris to Berneray, itself connected by causeway to North Uist. Until the Berneray Causeway opened, the ferry landed at Otternish. The service is operated by Caledonian MacBrayne and was provided by MV Loch Bhrusda until 2003, when she was replaced by the much larger, MV Loch Portain. A buoyed route is marked to ensure the ferry's safe passage. The MCA require that the vessel only proceed if the next two marker buoys are visible.
