= MV Eilean Na H-Oige =

Ferry built in 1980

History

United Kingdom
- Name: MV Eilean Na H-Oige
- Namesake: Scottish Gaelic: Eilean na h-Òige "The Island of Youth"
- Owner: Western Isles Council/Comhairle nan Eilean Siar; Aug 2003 Bere Island Ferries
- Route: Eriskay to South Uist; Bere Island
- Builder: Lewis Offshore Ltd, Stornoway
- Launched: 1980
- Status: In service

General characteristics
- Tonnage: 69 GT
- Length: 18.6 m (61 ft 0 in)
- Speed: 7 knots (13 km/h; 8.1 mph)
- Complement: 4 cars, 35 passengers

MV Eilean Na H-Oige is a small passenger ferry built for the Outer Hebrides and now operating in Southern Ireland.

== History ==
MV Eilean Na H-Oige was built for the Western Isles Council in 1980 for the service to Eriskay. Her name is taken from a poem about Eriskay by Fr. Allan MacDonald. After a causeway opened in 2001, she was laid up, until acquired by Bere Island Ferries in 2003.

== Layout ==
Eilean Na H-Oige is a small bow-loading landing craft type ferry.

== Service ==
Eilean Na H-Oige was built for the service from Eriskay to Ludaig on South Uist in the Outer Hebrides. In July 2001, a causeway opened, making her redundant. From March 2002, she started a new service across the Sound of Barra, from a new terminal at Ceann a' Ghàraidh to Ardmor on Barra. The service was taken over by CalMac vessels (MV Loch Linnhe then MV Loch Bhrusda) and she was laid up.

Since August 2003, she has operated from Castletownbere to Bere Island in County Cork, Ireland, alongside another former Comhairle nan Eilean Siar ferry, MV Eilean Bhearnaraigh.
