= Ceann a' Ghàraidh =

Coordinates: 57°4′14″N 7°18′28″W

Ceann a' Ghàraidh (Scottish Gaelic: [kʲon ə gari]) is the location of the ferry terminal on the south-western side of the island of Eriskay in the Outer Hebrides of Scotland. It provides a service across the Sound of Barra to Ardmore on the island of Barra The placename literally means "The head of the garden". This location is so called due to the presence of the old crofting boundary walls, which can no longer be seen.

- NF784102

== Comhairle nan Eilean Siar ferries ==
The small landing craft type ferry, MV Eilean Na H-Oige (1980) (based on Scottish Gaelic Eilean na h-Òige "The Island of Youth") provided a service from here to Ludaig on South Uist, until the causeway opened in July 2001. MV Eilean Bhearnaraigh (1982) similarly operated between Berneray and North Uist, until the Berneray Causeway opened in 1998.

== Sound of Barra ferry ==
The new harbour and slipway on Eriskay were constructed at the same time as the causeway on 2001–2002. The Comhairle nan Eilean Siar ferries started a new service across the Sound of Barra to Ardmor (Scottish Gaelic: Aird Mhòr) on 4 March 2002. This completed the whole link from Berneray to Vatersay, but they could only carry 5 cars. The new, larger CalMac ferry, MV Loch Bhrusda took over on 7 June 2003. and the old ferries were sold for further service in Bere Island (Ireland) and Papa Stronsay (Orkney). Since July 2007, the Sound of Barra service has been provided by the larger MV Loch Alainn.
