= Killegray =

Island in the Sound of Harris in the Outer Hebrides of Scotland

Ceileagraigh (Gaelic)
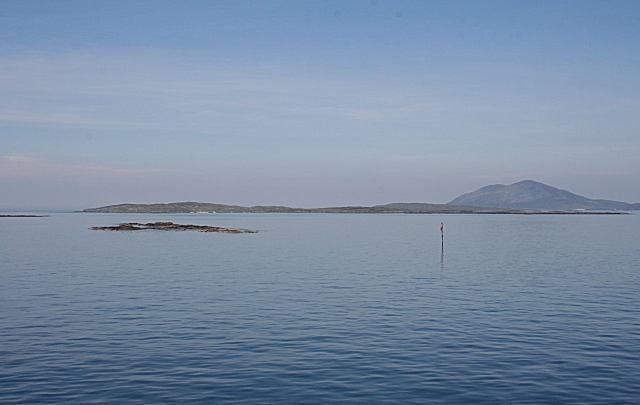
- Killegray from the southeast with the heights of Ceapabhal on Harris beyond

Location
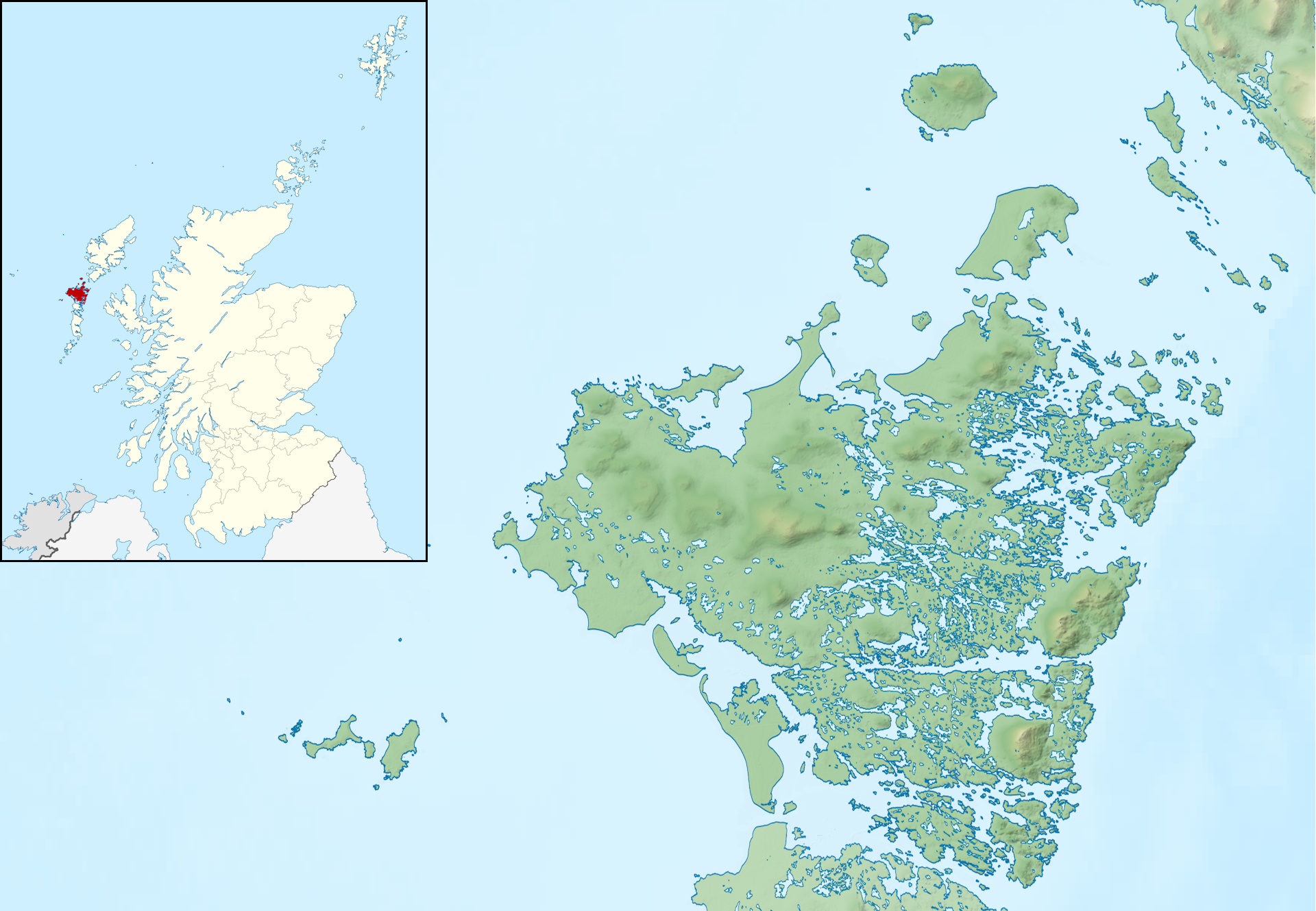
- Killegray shown next to North Uist Killegray shown within the Outer Hebrides
- OS grid reference: NF976836
- Coordinates: 57.74°N 7.08°W

Name
- Name meaning: Old Norse: graveyard island
- Old Norse name: kjallard-øy

Physical geography
- Island group: Outer Hebrides
- Area: 176 ha (11/16 sq mi)
- Area rank: 117
- Highest elevation: 45 m (148 ft)

Administration
- Council area: Comhairle nan Eilean Siar
- Country: Scotland
- Sovereign state: United Kingdom

Demographics
- Population: 1

Killegray is an island in the Sound of Harris in the Outer Hebrides of Scotland.

== Geography ==
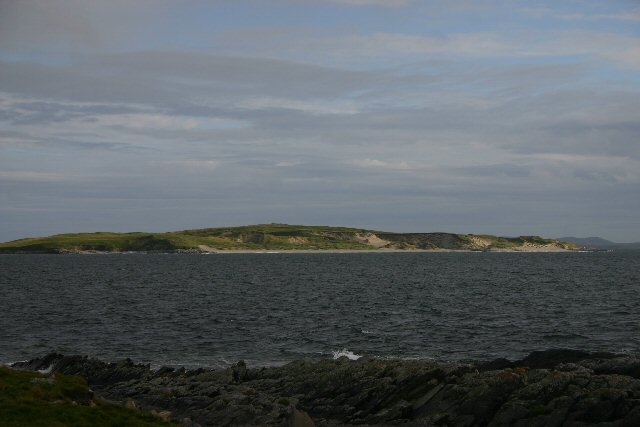
Killegray from Ensay

Situated in the Sound of Harris, a channel of water between North Uist and the Isle of Harris, Killegray is approximately 1 1/2 miles (2.5 kilometres) long.

The south end of the island is nearly all deep uncultivated moss. There is better cultivated land at the north.

== History ==
Rubha Claidhe in the north is the site of a ruined chapel, Teampull na h-Annait, which may be the origin of the island's name.

The island was occupied by a family of around three to eight people from 1841 to 1931. Two people were living on the island when the 1971 census was taken. The 19th-century Killegray House, the only house on the island, was renovated as holiday accommodation in 1991. No inhabitants were recorded as living there in 2011, but in the census of 2022 a population of one was returned.

== Wildlife ==
The shallow waters and reefs are a rich breeding ground for velvet crabs and lobsters.

== Possible development ==
Jacobs Babtie has investigated building a combination of bridges and causeways across the Sound of Harris. Wind turbines and tidal generators could be incorporated in the scheme from Berneray via Killegray and Ensay to Harris. The estimated cost of £75 million could rise to £145 million with the renewable energy devices.
