= 1981 in Scottish television =

This is a list of events in Scottish television from 1981.

== Events ==
=== July ===
- 29 July – The wedding of Prince Charles and Lady Diana Spencer takes place at St Paul's Cathedral. More than 30,000,000 viewers watch the wedding on television – the second highest television audience of all time in Britain.

=== September ===
- 1 September - 20th anniversary of Border Television.
- 8 September - BBC One Scotland changes its name to BBC Scotland.
- 30 September - 20th anniversary of Grampian Television.

=== October ===
- October - Scottish Television becomes the first ITV station to operate a regional Oracle teletext service, containing over 60 pages of local news, sport and information.
- 17 October - The first edition of a new Sunday lunchtime current affairs series Agenda is broadcast on BBC1 Scotland.

=== Unknown ===
- Scottish Television airs The Shepherds of Berneray, a 50-minute television documentary revolving around the people on the island of Berneray, North Uist, and how they lived at that time.
- Alistair Moffat is appointed Head of Arts at Scottish Television.

== Debuts ==
=== ITV ===
- 5 January - Now You See It (1981–1986)

== Television series ==
- Scotsport (1957–2008)
- Reporting Scotland (1968–1983; 1984–present)
- Top Club (1971–1998)
- Scotland Today (1972–2009)
- Sportscene (1975–Present)
- The Beechgrove Garden (1978–Present)
- Grampian Today (1980–2009)
- Take the High Road (1980–2003)

== Births ==
- 10 March - Nicci Jolly, television presenter
- 5 April - Shabana Akhtar, actress
- Unknown
  - Cat Cubie, weather presenter
  - Shauna Macdonald, actress
  - Catriona Shearer, news presenter

== Deaths ==
- 6 January - A. J. Cronin, 84, writer (Doctor Finlay's Casebook)

== See also ==
- 1981 in Scotland
