= MV Loch Bhrusda =

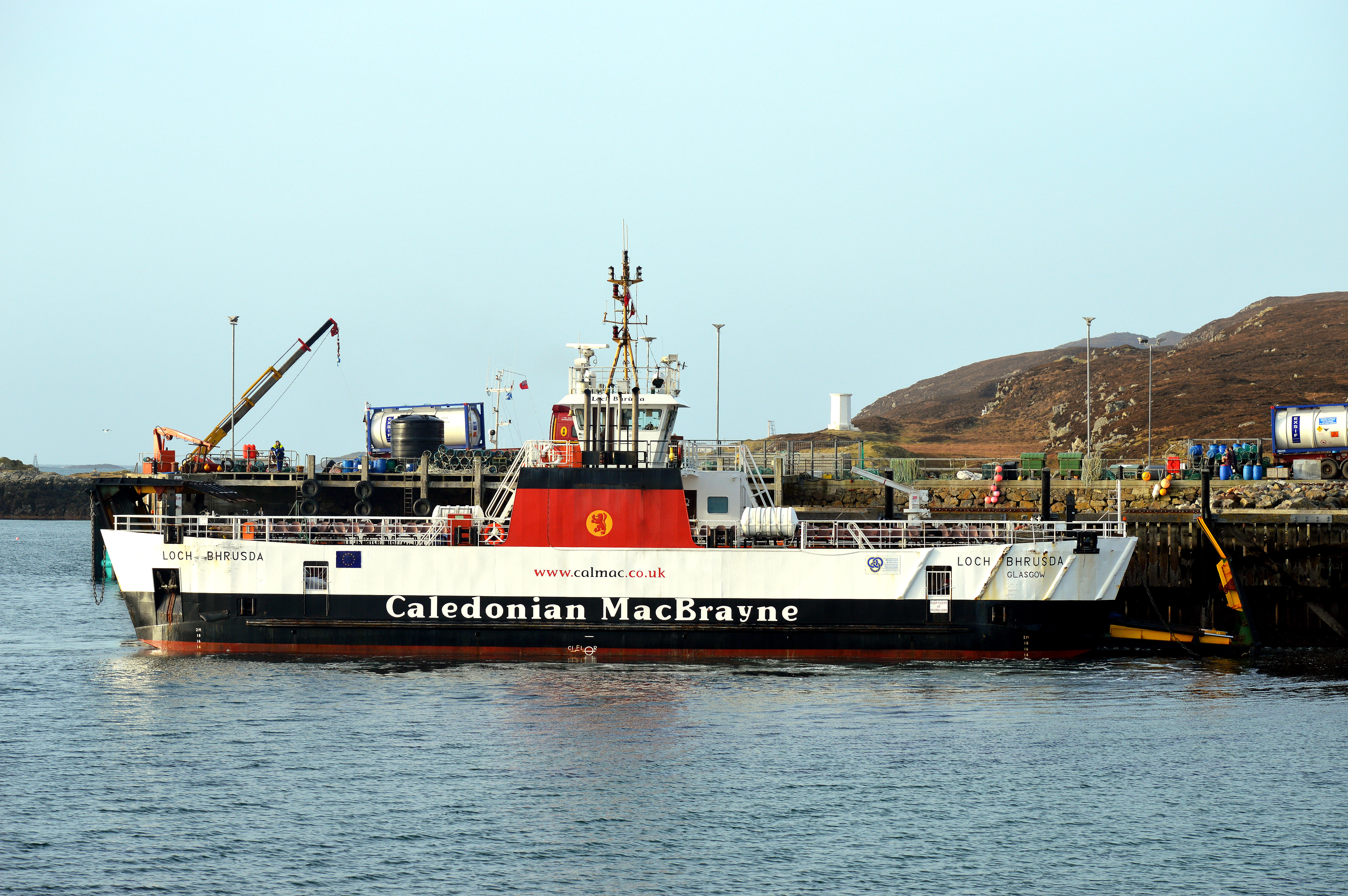
- Berthed at Leverburgh slipway whilst relieving the route she was originally built for in place of Loch Portain, February 2015.

History

United Kingdom
- Name: MV Loch Bhrusda
- Namesake: Loch Bhrusda, Berneray
- Owner: Caledonian Maritime Assets Limited
- Operator: Caledonian MacBrayne
- Port of registry: Glasgow
- Route: Mallaig - Armadale / Small Isles
- Builder: McTay Marine, Bromborough
- Yard number: 116
- Launched: 1 March 1996
- Completed: May 1996
- In service: 8 June 1996
- Identification: IMO number: 9129483; Callsign: MVFP9; MMSI Number: 232002598
- Status: in service

General characteristics
- Class & type: ro-ro vehicle ferry
- Tonnage: 246 GT
- Length: 35.4 m (116 ft 2 in)
- Beam: 10.8 m (35 ft 5 in)
- Draught: 1.4 m (4 ft 7 in)
- Installed power: Cummins KT38 Diesels
- Propulsion: Shottel Water pump
- Speed: 8 kn (15 km/h)
- Capacity: 150 passengers and 18 cars
- Crew: 3

MV Loch Bhrusda is a Caledonian Maritime Assets Limited water-jet propulsion ro-ro car ferry operated by Caledonian MacBrayne. After 11 years operating in the Outer Hebrides, she is now a Clyde-based relief small vessel.

== History ==
MV Loch Bhrusda was built by McTay Marine on the Mersey. Her sea trials included berthing trials at Largs and Cumbrae Slip, proving her suitable to relieve there. She started the Sound of Harris service in 1996, but it soon became apparent that she was too small and a new vessel was required for the increasingly popular route.

== Layout ==
MV Loch Bhrusda's car deck provides space for 18 cars. Passenger accommodation consists of a lounge, with toilet and snack vending machine. The bridge is in the centre of the vessel, above the car deck, giving a better view than the starboard bridge of earlier vessels.

Shallow water in the Sound of Harris led to the adoption of a water-jet propulsion system, rather than the Voith Schneider units of the earlier Loch Class ferries.

== Service ==
MV Loch Bhrusda was built for the new route between Leverburgh on Harris and Berneray, North Uist. The service was opened by MV Loch Tarbert, with Loch Bhrusda taking over on 8 June 1996. The crossing took an hour, initially connecting Leverburgh with a slipway at Otternish on North Uist, the departure point for the previously council-operated ferries to Berneray. For the first few seasons, Loch Bhrusda also carried out these sailings to Berneray. When the Berneray Causeway was completed, in April 1999, linking Berneray to Otternish, the ferry's southern terminus moved to a purpose-built slipway at the northern end of the causeway. Numerous reefs litter the Sound of Harris and a specific route was marked out to ensure the ferry's safe passage. Delays were experienced in poor visibility. as the MCA required that the vessel could only proceed as long as at least the next two marker buoys were visible.

By the end of the 1996 season, the new route was a huge success, with vehicle reservations becoming essential. A further order was placed with McTay Marine in 2002 for a much larger ferry for the following season. When the new MV Loch Portain arrived in early summer 2003, Loch Bhrusda moved south to the Sound of Barra, where she replaced MV Loch Linnhe. This new route linked Ardmhor on the northern side of Barra to the Isle of Eriskay, itself linked by causeway to South Uist.

In 2007, with the introduction of MV Loch Shira at Largs, MV Loch Alainn took over the Eriskay service and Loch Bhrusda became the Clyde spare vessel.

In October 2014, Loch Bhrusda relieved on the Sconser - Raasay route so that MV Hallaig could go for overhaul. In 2015, Loch Bhrusda relieved MV Loch Portain on the Sound of Harris route twice. On one of these occasions the latter ship had to go to dry dock after "making contact" with the Sound of Harris seabed.

During the summer of 2016, she was based at Mallaig, operating additional sailings on the Armadale service alongside MV Lochinvar and MV Lord of the Isles, and relieving MV Lochnevis on the Small Isles service.

In June 2017, Loch Bhrusda provided additional sailings from Claonaig to Lochranza alongside MV Catriona whilst MV Isle of Arran was away at James Watt Dock, Greenock, for emergency repairs.

In April 2024, Loch Bhrusda briefly operated between Largs and Cumbrae alongside MV Loch Riddon in lieu of MV Loch Shira which had been removed from service due to damage to her ramps. Loch Bhrusda replaced MV Isle of Cumbrae on the route, but the latter vessel returned shortly thereafter. She returned to Largs in May, operating alongside MV Loch Tarbert after a breakdown removed Isle of Cumbrae from service.

In June 2024, Loch Bhrusda was moved to Lochranza to cover MV Catriona, owing to damage to the latter vessel's ramps. Her place at Largs was taken up by MV Loch Fyne. Following this, she sailed for Mallaig to cover for Loch Fyne on sailings to Armadale alongside MV Coruisk.

In September 2024, Loch Bhrusda was redeployed to cover the Small Isles service in lieu of the MV Lochnevis, operating a vehicle and freight service. The chartered vessel MV Sheerwater operated a passenger only service, with charted vessel MV Larven taking over from Sheerwater every Saturday. On 13 October 2024, Lochnevis returned from overhaul and subsequently returned to the Small Isles service. Loch Bhrusda returned to the Mallaig - Armadale crossing, operating alongside MV Coruisk.
