= South Lewis, Harris and North Uist National Scenic Area =

Large national scenic area (NSA) in the Western Isles of Scotland

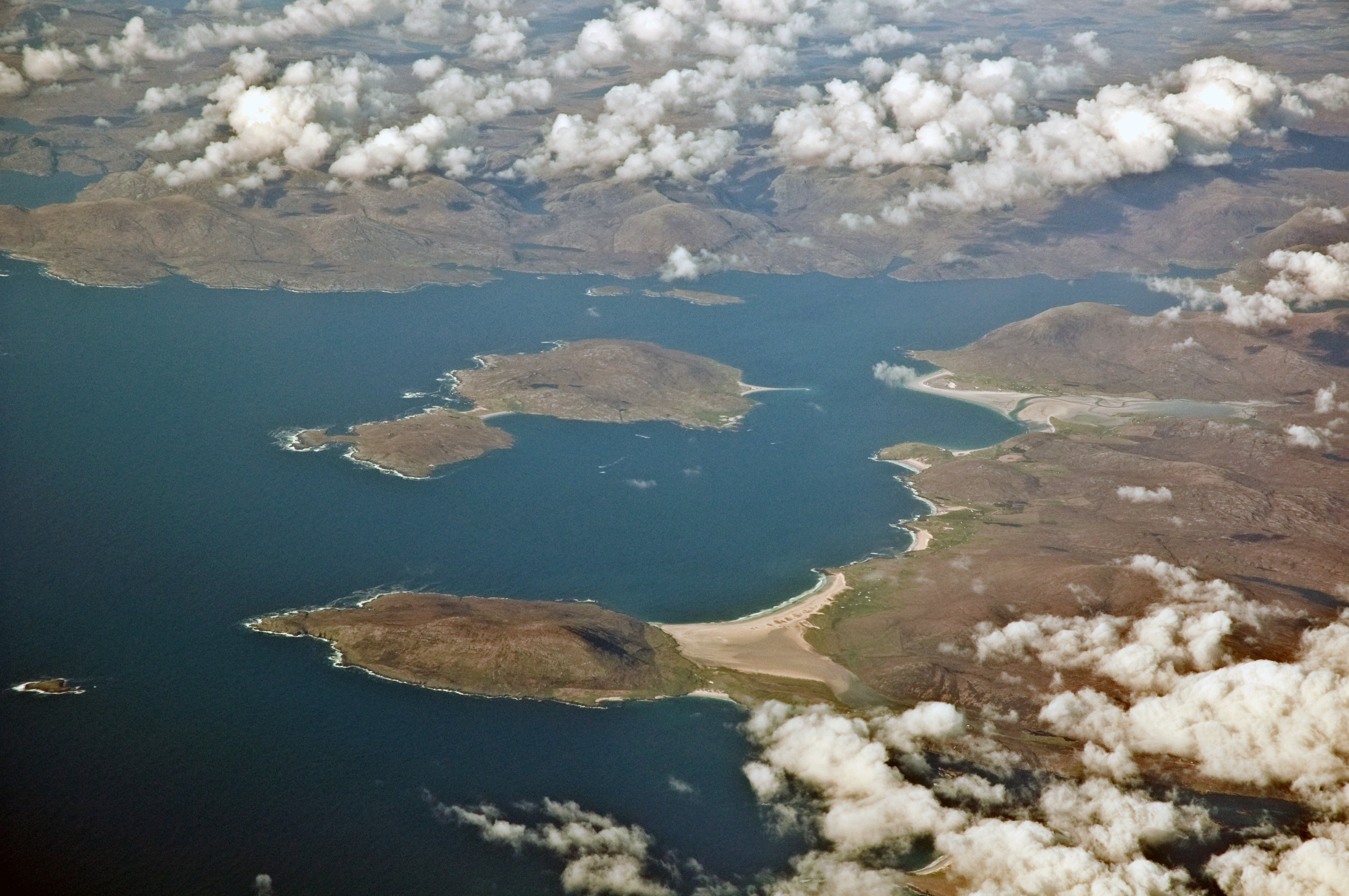
- West Loch Tarbert and Taransay

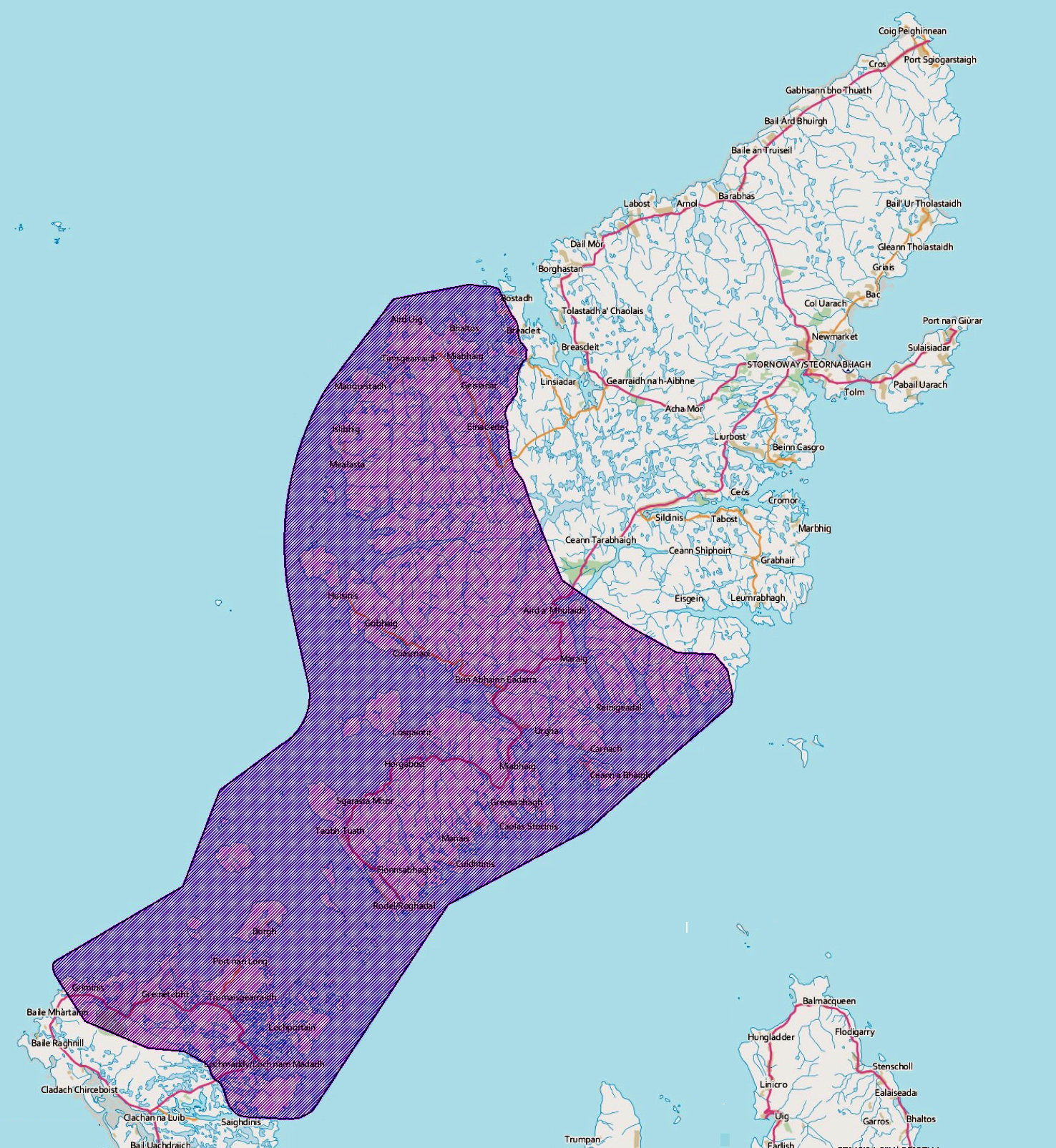
- The location of the NSA within the northern Outer Hebrides.
- Location: Western Isles, Scotland
- Coordinates: 57.676°N 7.066°W
- Area: 2,024 km^{2} (781 sq mi)
- Established: 1981
- Governing body: NatureScot

South Lewis, Harris and North Uist is a large national scenic area (NSA) in the Western Isles of Scotland. It is one of 40 such areas in Scotland, which are defined so as to identify areas of exceptional scenery and to ensure its protection from inappropriate development. The designated area covers 202,388 ha in total, of which 112,301 ha is on land, with a further 90,087 ha being marine (i.e. below low tide level), making it the largest of the NSAs in both total and marine area. The designated area includes the mountainous south west of Lewis, all of Harris, the Sound of Harris and the northern part of North Uist.

National scenic areas are primarily designated due to the scenic qualities of an area, however NSAs may well have other special qualities, for example related to culture, history, archaeology, geology or wildlife. Areas with such qualities may be protected via other national and international designations that overlap with the NSA designation. There are several Natura 2000 sites within the designated area of the NSA.

Although the national scenic area designation provides a degree of additional protection via the planning process, there are no bodies equivalent to a national park authority, and whilst local authorities (in this case Comhairle nan Eilean Siar) can produce a management strategy for each one, only the three national scenic areas within Dumfries and Galloway have current management strategies.

== Creation of the national scenic area ==
Following the Second World War, a committee, chaired by Sir Douglas Ramsay, was established to consider preservation of the landscape in Scotland. The report, published in 1945 proposed that five areas (Loch Lomond and the Trossachs, the Cairngorms, Glen Coe-Ben Nevis-Black Mount, Wester Ross and Glen Strathfarrar-Glen Affric-Glen Cannich) should receive a level of protection. Accordingly, the government designated these areas as "national park direction areas", giving powers for planning decisions taken by local authorities to be reviewed by central government. Following a further review of landscape protection in 1978, additional areas, including the area of the current South Lewis, Harris and North Uist NSA, were identified as worthy of protection due to their landscape qualities. Accordingly, in 1981 the direction areas were replaced by the national scenic area designation, which were based on the 1978 recommendations and thus included this area. The defined area remains as originally mapped in 1978, but was redesignated under new legislation in 2010. Since this date there have been calls for further protection of the scenery of the area, although the Scottish Government rejected a proposal to create a national park on Harris in 2011. In 2013 the Scottish Campaign for National Parks proposed seven areas deemed suitable for national park status, one of which was Harris, but in September 2016 Roseanna Cunningham, the Cabinet Secretary for Environment, Climate Change and Land Reform told the Scottish Parliament that the Government had no plans to designate new national parks in Scotland and instead planned to focus on the two existing national parks.

== Description ==
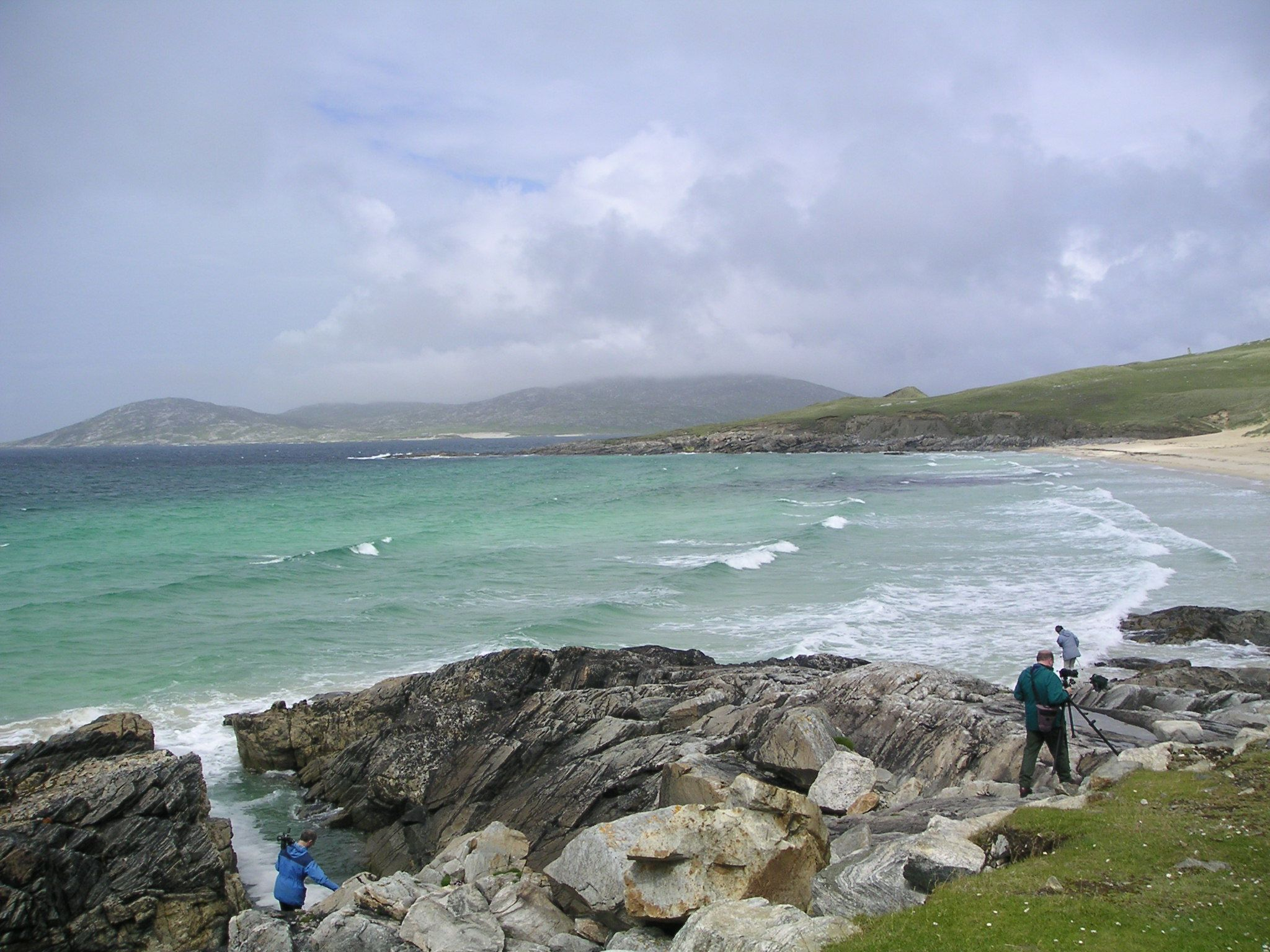
South Harris.

North Harris contains Clisham (799m), the highest peak in the Outer Hebrides. Steep-sided glens, with precipitous crags, have a mountainous character. Exposure and grazing prevent tree growth. Deep sea lochs in the east penetrate far into the hills. The east coast of Harris has many bays and islets. The west coast has wide, sandy beaches with machair. Rocky headlands, separating the bays, have been sculptured into geos and stacks. Scattered islands lies in the Sound of Harris between South Harris and North Uist.

On North Uist the spectacular deep peatland supports a wide variety of vegetation and birds. The settlement of Lochmaddy (an anglicisation of the Scottish Gaelic Loch nam Madadh) is a ferry terminal, and a harbour for the creel fishing and is used for salmon farms.

== Conservations designations ==
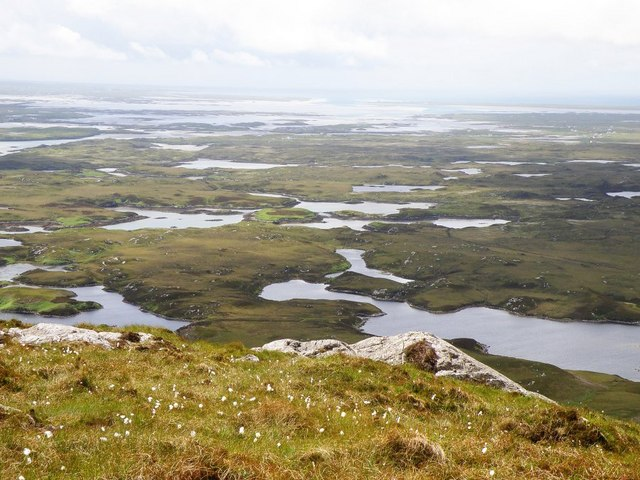
View over northern North Uist.

There are four Special Protection Areas (SPA) and five Special Areas of Conservation (SAC), within or overlapping with the NSA. The areas protected by these two Natura 2000 designations overlap, with four sites sharing both designations (although the precise borders differ to some extent).

- The Grimersta river and loch system at Langavat in south Lewis is regarded as the best salmon system in the Western Isles and is protected as an SAC. It also forms part of an SPA covering the peatlands of Lewis, which is protected due to the presence of breeding black-throated divers, dunlins, golden eagles, golden plovers, greenshank, merlin and red-throated divers.
- Much of North Harris is protected as a SAC due to the variety of montane and heathland habitats. The area is also protected as an SPA due to the presence of breeding pairs of golden eagles.
- The machair of North Uist is the second-largest area of machair in the Western Isles, and differs from the machair of South Uist due to the fact that a high proportion of it has been traditionally cultivated or used for rough pasture, promoting a different ecosystem to that found further south. It is protected as both an SAC and an SPA, with the SPA designation also taking parts of the nearby islands of Berneray, Pabbay and Boreray.
- Loch nam Madadh is a unique fjardic sea loch that forms part of one of the most extensive and diverse water systems in Europe, combining both salt and fresh water. Loch nam Madadh supports an unusual combination of intertidal plants and animals, and is protected as an SAC. In some of the lagoons, fresh water organisms grow in a layer just above salt water organisms.
- Mointeach Scadabhaigh is an area of blanket bog in South Uist. It is the UK's largest example of a type of blanket bog that is rare in Britain, occurring at only two other sites. It is also home to a productive breeding population of red- and black-throated divers, with the area hosting one of the highest-density populations of red-throated divers in the UK. It is protected as both an SAC and an SPA.
