= Selina Scott =

English television presenter (born 1951)

- Born: Selina Mary Scott; 13 May 1951 (age 75); Scarborough, North Riding of Yorkshire, England
- Education: University of East Anglia (BA)
- Occupations: Television presenter, author
- Known for: The Sunday Post, North Tonight, News at Ten, Breakfast Time, The Clothes Show, Wogan, West 57th, Sky News, The Selina Scott Show, Sunday Mail, Sky Arts 1

Selina Mary Scott (born 13 May 1951) is an English television presenter who co-hosted the first dedicated breakfast television programme in the UK, Breakfast Time. She was subsequently a presenter of the BBC's The Clothes Show and joined West 57th, a prime-time current-affairs show in the United States.

== Journalism ==
Scott trained in Dundee on D. C. Thomson's The Sunday Post newspaper, before becoming press officer for the Highlands and Islands Tourist board on the Isle of Bute. She made her television debut on North Tonight, the nightly news programme for the regional ITV station Grampian Television, in Aberdeen at the height of the North Sea oil boom.

== British television ==
Several months after North Tonight began, Scott, aged 29, moved to national TV, appearing as a newsreader on ITN's News at Ten. In 1982, at the outbreak of the Falklands War, Scott became a forces pin-up.

She was recruited by the BBC to launch Breakfast Time in January 1983. In contrast to Alastair Burnet and Sandy Gall, who had welcomed her at ITN, she presented the new show with an adversarial Frank Bough. In a 2021 interview, Scott said Bough deliberately undermined her by interrupting mid-question and in other ways; when she attempted to complain she said that senior management simply were not interested, stating: "They seemed to have no emotional intelligence, and they let men like Frank Bough roam the BBC without any check on them." She also said there was a very sexist atmosphere at the BBC, "this malevolence".

When she left Breakfast Time, she accepted a role as presenter of the BBC's The Clothes Show (1986–1988), and was guest host on the chat show Wogan. Here she interviewed, amongst many others, Ginger Rogers and Prince Andrew. In connection with interviewing Andrew, she says he asked her out, but she managed to ignore it.

It was at this time that Albert Broccoli, the producer of the James Bond films, auditioned Scott for the role of Miss Moneypenny in The Living Daylights. "He sat me on a high stool so he and his producer could get a good eyeful," Scott told The Lady in 2013.

Scott appeared on Britain's first satellite service, BSB, before moving to Rupert Murdoch's Sky when the two companies merged. There she co-anchored its 1992 election-night coverage with David Frost.

Scott has also produced independent documentaries on European royalty including A Prince Among Islands, a profile of Prince Charles which achieved 14 million viewers, the first in-depth interview with King Juan Carlos of Spain, The Year of Spain (which also achieved record viewing figures for a documentary in Spain) and The Return of the King, returning to Greece with King Constantine and his family after 25 years of exile.

In 2007, she took part in the BBC Two series: The Underdog Show to highlight the Dogs Trust Charity for rescued animals. After six weeks of intensive training, she was voted the winner with an abandoned wolfhound cross Chump, defeating singer Huey Morgan and actress Julia Sawalha in the final.

In October 2008, Scott presented a four-part series for the Sky Arts channel and ITV, Edward Seago – The Forgotten Painter, and included interviews with Prince Philip, Duke of Edinburgh; who described how he and Seago explored a pristine Antarctic abroad HMY Britannia soon after the first official royal tour to Australia.

In 2018, Scott appeared in four episodes of the BBC's The Real Marigold Hotel, shot in Rajasthan, which she had always wanted to visit as her great-great-grandfather (a soldier surgeon) survived the Siege of Lucknow.

In December 2020, Scott was one of the four walkers travelling with a 360-degree camera, in the first series of BBC Four's Winter Walks. Scott's episode featured a walk through Wharfedale in the Yorkshire Dales.

== United States and Donald Trump ==
CBS in the United States hired her for their news show West 57th, which on one assignment took her to Kenya. For CBS, Scott gained exclusive access and revealing interviews with, amongst others, George Harrison, Prince Charles, Bono of U2 and the world chess champion Garry Kasparov.

Whilst in America, Scott interviewed Donald Trump. Her 1995 documentary for ITV about Trump was the first investigation into his honesty. Owing to a technical issue with the camera, Scott interviewed Trump twice, the programme intercut them. Scott remembers that she did not charm Trump in any way and came away thinking that he was a man who likes to impress women, stating: "I just went in and got the information I needed, and didn't really think about whether I liked him or not". When the interviews ended, his staff mentioned that Trump 'liked her – a lot' and thought she was 'wonderful and charming' and was captivated by her. When it aired on ITV, Trump was shocked by its critical tone and threatened Scott with legal action and sent her numerous angry threatening letters, an issue which partly became public knowledge at the time.

Trump warned ITV that if they sold the rights to any of the American television stations that were bidding for it, he would tie them up in the courts. ITV complied, meaning the US press and public were unable to see the documentary. It also started a long-running feud between Trump and Scott.

Shortly after the interview with Trump, Scott signed a deal reportedly worth $200,000 to host her own talk show, The Selina Scott Show for NBC Super Channel. By 1997, she was back in the UK, signing a contract with Sky reputedly for £1,000,000. She hosted the breakfast programme, later switching to the 5pm news.

== Personal life ==
Scott lives on a 200 acres (81 ha) farm in a designated Area of Outstanding Natural Beauty in Coxwold, North Yorkshire where she has created a "nature haven" for threatened species.

She is the eldest of five children: her brother Robin is editor of Britain's best-selling shooting magazine, Sporting Gun and her sisters are Angela, Vanessa, and Fiona, the last a fine-art portrait artist, who regularly exhibits at the Royal Society of Portrait Painters Exhibition in London. In April 2007, Fiona exhibited a long-awaited portrait of Selina, who purchased it.

At the time when Princess Diana was, like Scott, having problems with the press, Michael Shea, press secretary to the Queen, asked Scott if she would befriend the princess. He thought that Scott might be able to advise her on dealing with the press; Scott commented "the trouble was I was going through just the same as she was". Scott did befriend Diana, but they did not discuss the press.

Scott became Patron of the Charles Dickens Society, based in Malton, North Yorkshire, raising a public appeal to buy a rare signed edition of A Christmas Carol at auction in New York. The story of the rescue of the book found in a refuse bin in New York, and its homecoming to the market town of Malton (where the character of Scrooge and his Counting House was reputedly based) made national headlines.

In March 2012, Scott was awarded an Honorary Doctorate of Journalism degree from the University of Hull.

=== Activism ===
Scott is an active campaigner for causes such as animal welfare and wildlife conservation, spearheading a campaign to ban the live transportation of animals in Europe after Brexit, which achieved over 100,000 signatures to initiate a debate in Parliament. She supported Brexit because of this issue.

In August 2008, Scott announced her intention to sue Channel 5, a UK television station, for age discrimination. She said Five reneged on an agreement for her to return to News because she was "too old". Scott hired Simon Smith of Schillings, and Five denied the claim. A preliminary hearing began on 24 September 2008 with a full five-day hearing scheduled for December 2008. On 5 December 2008, she won the case with Five issuing a public apology and making a confidential out-of-court financial settlement. It was later reported that she accepted the offer, despite publicly declaring she would have her day in court, as her father had become seriously ill in December. He died on Christmas Eve and she wanted to be at his side and felt unable to continue the action as planned.

Following her claim against ageism, Age UK and Equal Justice, a legal firm, commissioned Scott to compile a report investigating the employment of women over 50 years old at the BBC. The report was delivered to Sir Michael Lyons, Chairman of the BBC Trust and Jeremy Hunt, the shadow Culture and Media Secretary in April 2010. The report accused the BBC of institutional ageism against older women.

== Charitable patronage ==
- President: Malton Food Lovers Festival
- Patron: Charles Dickens (Malton) Society
- Patron: Animals Worldwide
- Patron: National Star College
