= A Prince Among Islands =

A Prince Among Islands is a television programme about Prince Charles' visit to Berneray.

In 1987, Charles, Prince of Wales, visited Berneray in the Outer Hebrides, for a week to learn about crofting. During his stay, he planted and lifted potatoes, cut peat, helped dip sheep, and planted trees on the 92-acre (370,000 m^{2}) arable croft. The Prince required that the island's inhabitants maintain his privacy from the press. He returned in 1999, when he joined the 140 residents for the official opening of the £7 million causeway to North Uist.

The programme portrays his relationship with the island of Berneray. It was produced by Grampian Television, presented by Selina Scott and broadcast on 10 May 1992 throughout the ITV network. Music for the programme was written and performed by Capercaillie and released at the time on an EP which peaked at number 39 in the UK Singles Chart the week after the programme was broadcast. It was later included on the 1995 reissue of their album The Blood Is Strong.
