= MV Loch Portain =

2003 Scottish ferry

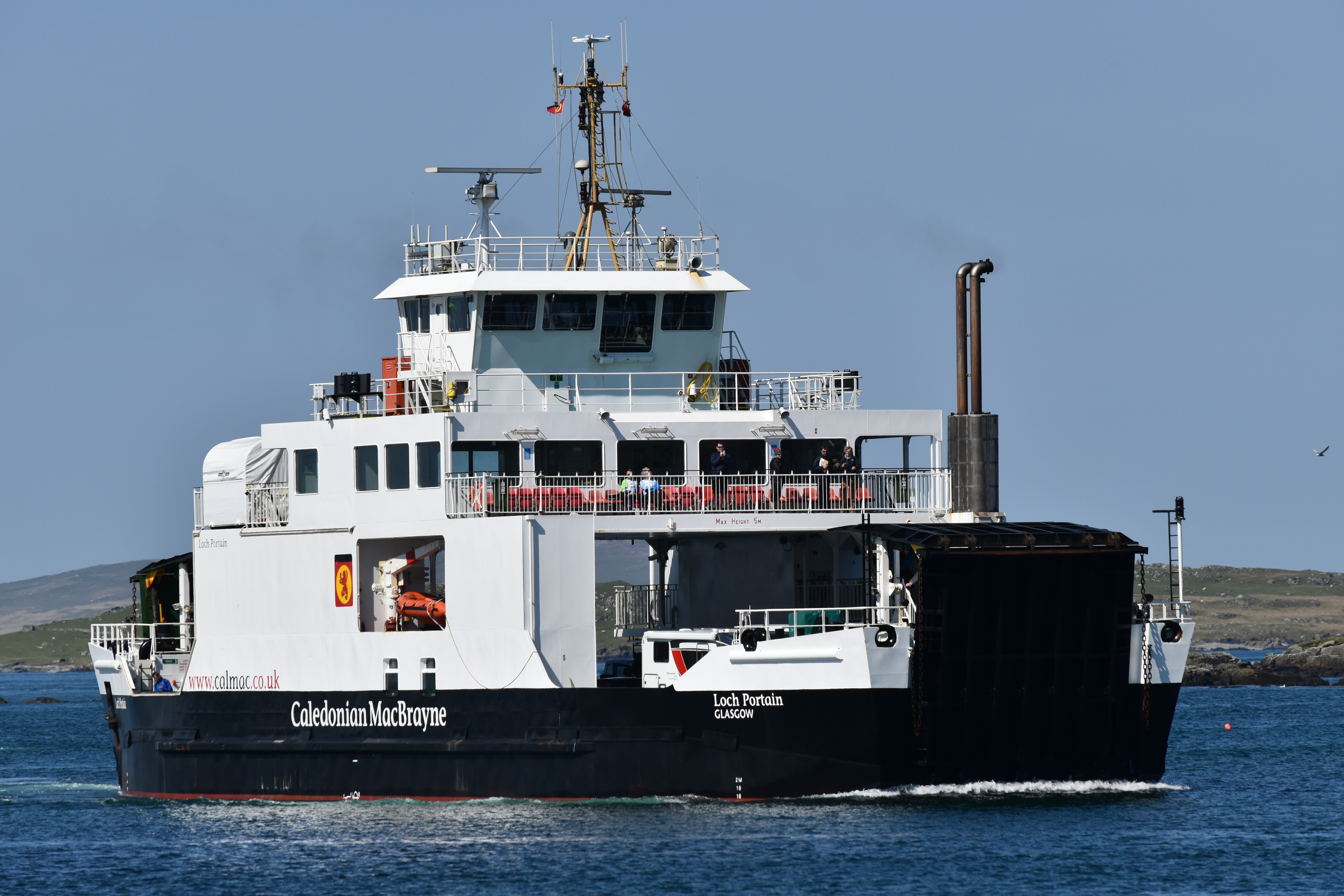
- Approaching Leverburgh, Harris on 9 May 2016.

History

United Kingdom
- Name: MV Loch Portain; Scottish Gaelic: Lochportain
- Owner: Caledonian Maritime Assets Limited
- Operator: Caledonian MacBrayne
- Port of registry: Glasgow
- Route: Berneray - Leverburgh (Sound of Harris)
- Builder: Feniks, Gdańsk and McTay Marine, Bromborough
- Yard number: McTay 129
- Launched: 24 March 2003
- Completed: May 2003
- In service: 5 June 2003
- Identification: IMO number: 9274824; Callsign: VQKE8; MMSI number: 235008928
- Status: in service

General characteristics
- Class & type: Ro-Ro vehicle ferry
- Tonnage: 950 GT; 170 DWT
- Length: 49 m (161 ft)
- Beam: 14.4 m (47 ft 3 in)
- Draught: 1.5 m (4 ft 11 in)
- Propulsion: Schottel Water Pump Jets x 4 and as of May 2026 4 x Volvo Penta D16 replacement engines
- Speed: 10.5 kn (19.4 km/h)
- Capacity: 146 passengers and 34 cars
- Crew: 5 Winter, 6 Summer

MV Loch Portain (Scottish Gaelic: Lochportain) is a Caledonian Maritime Assets Limited water-jet propulsion ro-ro car ferry, operated by Caledonian MacBrayne, built for the Sound of Harris crossing in the Outer Hebrides of Scotland.

== History ==
Soon after the Sound of Harris service started in 1996 using the new vessel MV Loch Bhrusda, it became apparent that a new vessel was required. This was built, as another large variant on the successful Loch Class, by McTay Marine on the Mersey. The new ferry was named MV Loch Portain on 23 April 2003 and undertook sea trials, before arriving in North Uist on 1 June.

During January and February 2016, Loch Portain was fitted with a passenger lift and 2 MES evacuation systems, 1 port and 1 starboard, whilst dry docking in Birkenhead.

== Layout ==
MV Loch Portain's car deck provides space for up to 34 cars. Passenger accommodation, above the car deck, contains several internal seating areas, forward and aft external seating areas, toilets, information boards and a basic vending machine. A passenger lift and 2 MES systems were installed in Birkenhead in February 2016. Her bridge, above the passenger lounge, provides a grandstand view - essential on the tortuous Sound of Harris route.

A lack of depth in the Sound of Harris led to the adoption of a water-jet propulsion system, rather than the Voith Schneider units of the other Loch Class ferries.

== Service ==
MV Loch Portain was built for the Leverburgh (Harris) to Berneray (North Uist) route and has operated there since 2003. MV Loch Bhrusda had started the service in 1996, but could only carry 18 cars and soon proved inadequate. Initially, the service connected Leverburgh with a slipway at Otternish on North Uist, until the Berneray Causeway opened in April 1999, when the ferry's southern terminus moved to a purpose-built slipway at the northern end of the causeway.

The shallow Sound of Harris is full of islands, sandbacks and rocks, and the route followed by the ferry covers nine nautical miles in an hour. From Leverburgh the ferry skirts the islets near the Harris coast before heading south to North Uist. Close to the island of Grodhaigh it takes a sharp right turn and heads nearly due west to the southern tip of Berneray.

Loch Portain carries twice as many cars as the Loch Bhrusda, and more passengers. The new ferry is more stable in heavier seas (being designed to sail in winds up to Force 7/8) and also significantly quieter than her predecessor. The route has proved far more popular than predicted and reservations are advised for vehicles. In Summer 2006, the service started to operate seven days per week, making it the first route to operate a Sunday service to the northern half of the Western Isles.

Loch Portain came to the rescue in February 2015 when Loch Shira broke down alongside in Largs leaving hundreds of passengers and in excess of 100 vehicles stranded. Loch Portain was en route to her annual dry docking and was due to dock alongside in Largs for the night. After getting permission, she was able to take up the run and help clear the backlog of traffic. She continued the run the next morning, until another relief vessel arrived.

In October 2015, Loch Portain "made contact" with the sea bed in the Sound of Harris, resulting in a short spell in dry dock undergoing repairs.
