= Donald MacKillop =

Scottish songwriter and poet

Donald MacKillop (Gaelic: Dòmhnall MacPhilip) (15 January 1926 - 26 August 2015) was a Scottish songwriter and poet who worked mainly in Scottish Gaelic.

== Life and career ==
=== Early life ===
Donald MacKillop was born on the island of Berneray, North Uist and attended Berneray school until the age of 14. In 1941 he spent seven months as a shepherd on the island of Pabbay, Harris, which at that time was deserted except for three shepherds. This was a formative experience and he wrote a number of poems about the island. After working on Pabbay he moved to Fort William with his family and worked at the aluminium smelter in Corpach. In 1944, aged 17 he joined the Royal Navy as a boy sailor and served on the North Atlantic Convoys, on the Flower-class corvette, HMS Loosestrife.

=== Career ===
In 1950, MacKillop joined the Strathclyde Police force where he worked for 25 years in the Maryhill division.

== Works ==
He is best known for "Coille an Fhàsaich" (The Wilderness Wood), a song that won the new song competition at the Pan Celtic Festival in Killearney in 1975. Another song, "Dualchas" (Heredity), was selected as the Scottish entrant in the festival in 1976. The song "Rosan" (Roses), written for his first wife, is sung by Anne Lorne Gillies on the album Gaelic Women.

=== Themes ===
Depopulated communities feature throughout MacKillop's work. "Coille an Fhàsaich", written from the point of view of his first wife, who was from the island of Skye, describes a deserted landscape marked by ruined houses. The poem "Tilleadh a Hirt" (Returning to St Kilda) tells of a St Kildan returning to a cleared island post-evacuation, and another poem, "Eilean Phabaigh" (Island of Pabbay) portrays an island where the people "went not of their own free will".
