= MV Eilean Bhearnaraigh =

Ship built in 1982

History

United Kingdom
- Name: MV Eilean Bhearnaraigh
- Namesake: Berneray
- Builder: George Brown & Company, Greenock; Engines: Volvo Penta (UK) Ltd, Watford
- Yard number: 283
- Launched: 1982
- Identification: IMO number: 8201557

General characteristics
- Tonnage: 67gt 3nt
- Length: 15.90m/55.1ft
- Beam: 7.00m/23.0ft
- Draught: 1.65m
- Propulsion: Twin diesels 2 x M6cy 290bhp 2scr
- Speed: 7.3 knots on trials 11/10/1982

MV Eilean Bhearnaraigh is a small passenger ferry built for the Outer Hebrides. After serving the monks on Papa Stronsay, she now operates in Southern Ireland as Sancta Maria.

== History ==
MV Eilean Bhearnaraigh, a small landing craft type ferry, was built for Comhairle nan Eilean Siar in 1982, to provide the first vehicular link between Berneray and Otternish. After the new causeway opened in 1998, she ran as the Eriskay ferry. In 2002 she was bought by the monks of Papa Stronsay, a small island in the Orkney archipelago.

== Service ==
MV Eilean Bhearnaraigh was built for the Berneray crossing, coming into service in 1982. Displaced from there in 1996, by the MV Loch Bhrusda, she moved to the Eriskay service, also serving as secondary vessel for the Sound of Barra service.

In 2002 she was purchased by the monks of Papa Stronsay to service their monastery.

She now runs to Bere Island in Southern Ireland and is named Sancta Maria.
