= Shepherds of Berneray =

Documentary about Island of Berneray

The Shepherds of Berneray is a 50-minute documentary that aired on UK television in 1981. The documentary revolves around the people on the island of Berneray, North Uist, Scotland, during that time, and how they lived.

The show focuses upon the people of Berneray, who had lived on the island for most of their lives, over the course of a year. It was filmed by Americans Allen Moore and the late Jack Shea over a year, in 1978-79.

It screened at the Edinburgh International Film Festival in 1981.

== Synopsis ==
The story begins at a croft belonging to Kate Dix; at that time she was the oldest person on the island. They interview John Ferguson, a crofter on Berneray, and he tells how the population of Berneray has decreased rapidly; only around 100 live on the island now. Next there is a sheep dip.

Angus Munro is seen in winter, gathering seaweed for fertiliser. He describes how he passed on his boat to his son, retired from fishing, and moved to full-time crofting. Angus Munro's son John finds it good work. The show visits summer grazing on the nearby islands of Pabbay for shearing and castrating of the rams. The show ends with Kate Dix at her croft, praising Berneray and everything on it.
