= Machair =

Fertile low-lying grassy plain

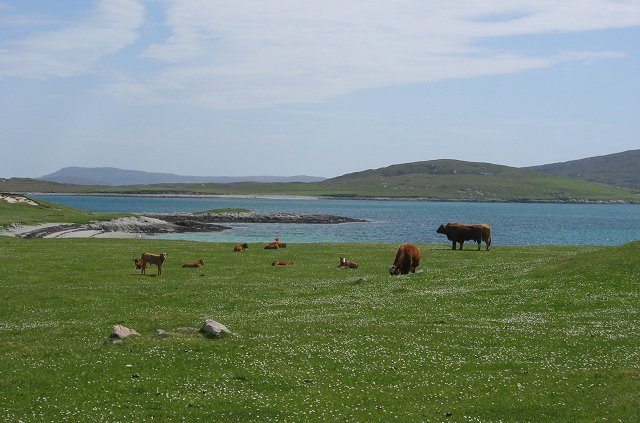
The machair on Berneray, Outer Hebrides

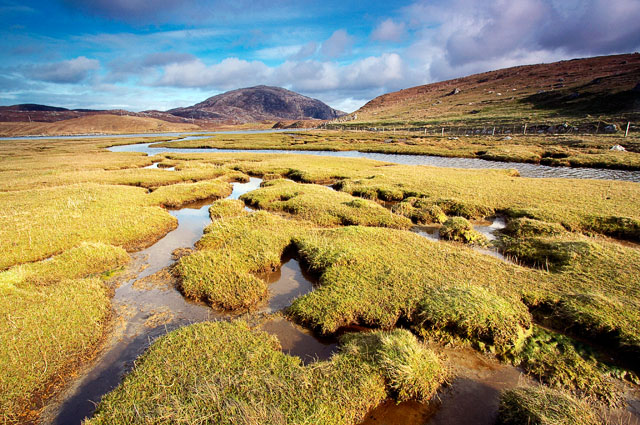
Machair east of Uig Bay, Lewis

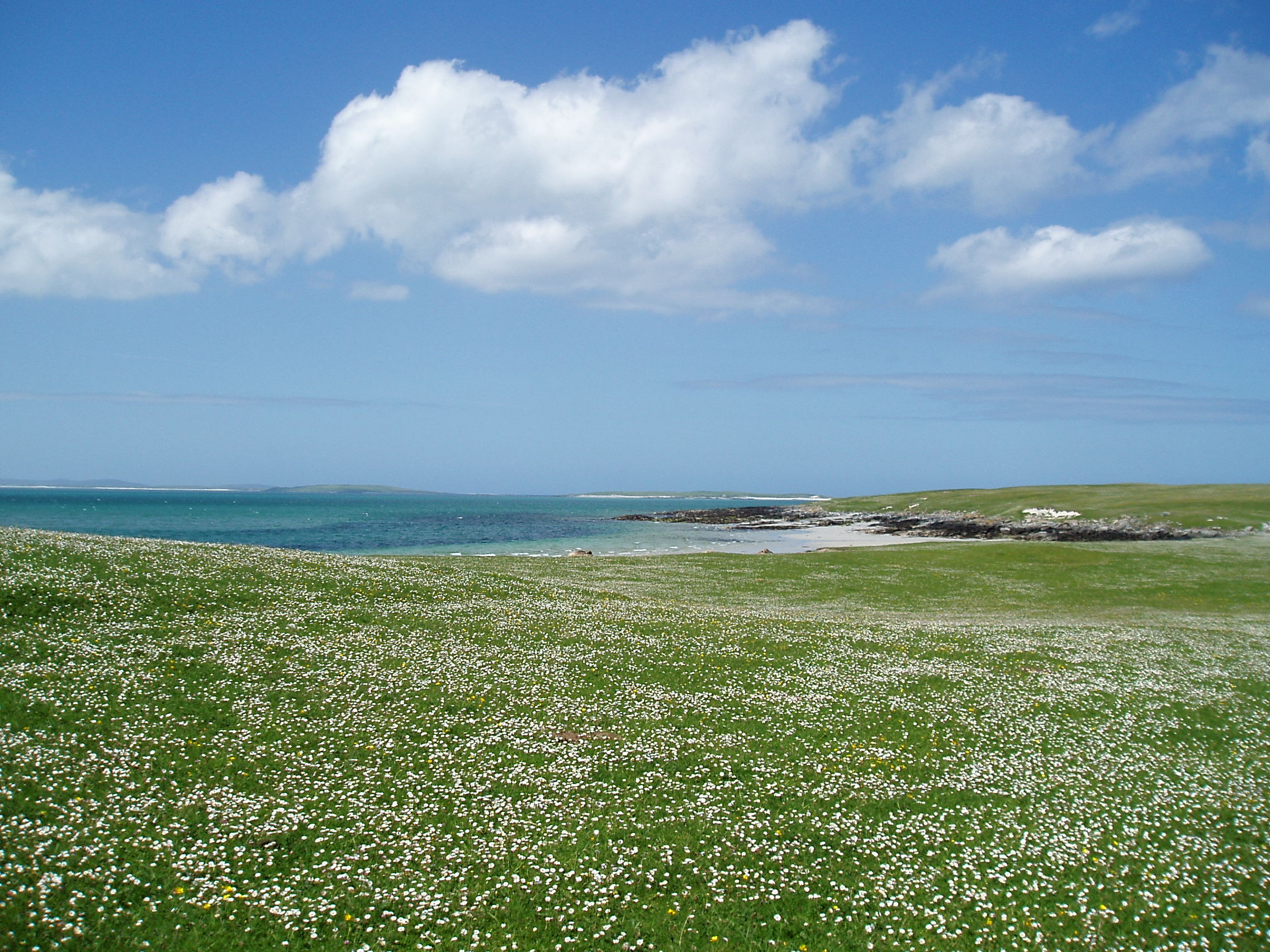
The machair towards West beach, Isle of Berneray, Outer Hebrides

A machair (Scottish Gaelic pronunciation: [ˈmaxɪɾʲ]; sometimes machar in English) is a fertile low-lying grassy plain found on part of the northwestern coastlines of Ireland and Scotland, particularly the Outer Hebrides. The best examples are found on North and South Uist, Harris and Lewis. Machairs in Ireland are listed as priority habitats, receiving the highest level of protection, in the EU Habitats Directive.

== Etymology ==
Machair is a Gaelic word meaning "fertile plain", but the word is now also used in scientific literature to describe the dune grasslands unique to western Scotland and northwest Ireland. It has been used by naturalists since 1926, but the term was not adopted by scientists until the 1940s. The word is used in a number of Irish, Scottish and Manx place names to refer to low-lying fertile ground or fields, even in areas not on duneland. In Scotland, some Gaelic speakers use machair as a general term for the entire dune system, including the dune ridge, while others restrict its use to the extensive flat grasslands inland of the dune ridge. In Ireland, the word has only been used in place names, and the existence of the habitat there was only confirmed in 2013. In Manx Gaelic, 'magher' is a common term for a field.

In 1976, an attempt was made to strictly define machair, although a number of systems still evade classification. This proved difficult when the habitat was listed on Annex I of the Habitats Directive in 1992, leading to the distinction between "machair grassland" and the "machair system".

== Geography ==
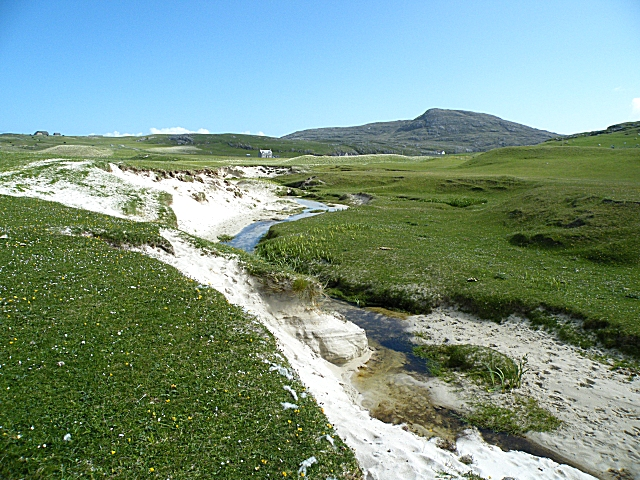
A stream cutting through the machair highlights a sandy composition

Machair differs from the links on the east coast of Scotland in having a lower mineral content, whereas the links are high in silica. Machair plains are highly calcareous, with calcium carbonate concentrations ranging from 20% to 80% on the beaches, and decreasing further away from the coast. The pH of a machair is typically greater than 7, i.e. it is alkaline.

The inside of a machair is often wet or marshy, and may contain lochs.

=== Formation ===
The modern theory of machair formation was first put forward by William MacGillivray in 1830. He worked out that shell fragments are rolled by waves towards the shore, where they are further broken up. The small shell fragments are blown up the beach to form mounds, which are then blown inland.

=== Humans ===
Human activity has played an important role in the creation of the machair. Archaeological evidence suggests that some trees were cleared for agriculture as early as 6000 BC, but there was still some woodland on the coast of South Uist as late as 1549. Seaweed deposited by early farmers provided a protective cover and added nutrients to the soil. The grass is kept short by cattle and sheep, which also trample and add texture to the sward, forming tussocks that favour a number of bird species.

The soil is low in a number of key nutrients, including trace elements such as copper, cobalt and manganese, requiring cattle to be fed supplements or taken to summer pastures elsewhere. The sandy soil does not hold nutrients well, making artificial fertilisers ineffective and limiting the crops that can be grown to certain varieties of oats and rye, and bere barley.

== Ecology ==
Machairs have received considerable ecological and conservational attention, chiefly because of their unique ecosystems.

=== Sea ===
Kelp in the sea next to the machair softens the impact of waves, reducing erosion, and when it is washed ashore by storms, forms a protective barrier on the beach. As the kelp decays, it provides a home for local sand flies, which in turn provide food for flocks of starlings and other passerines, wintering waders, gulls and others. When covered with sand, kelp will compost to form a fertile bed in which annual coastal flowers and marram grass will thrive.

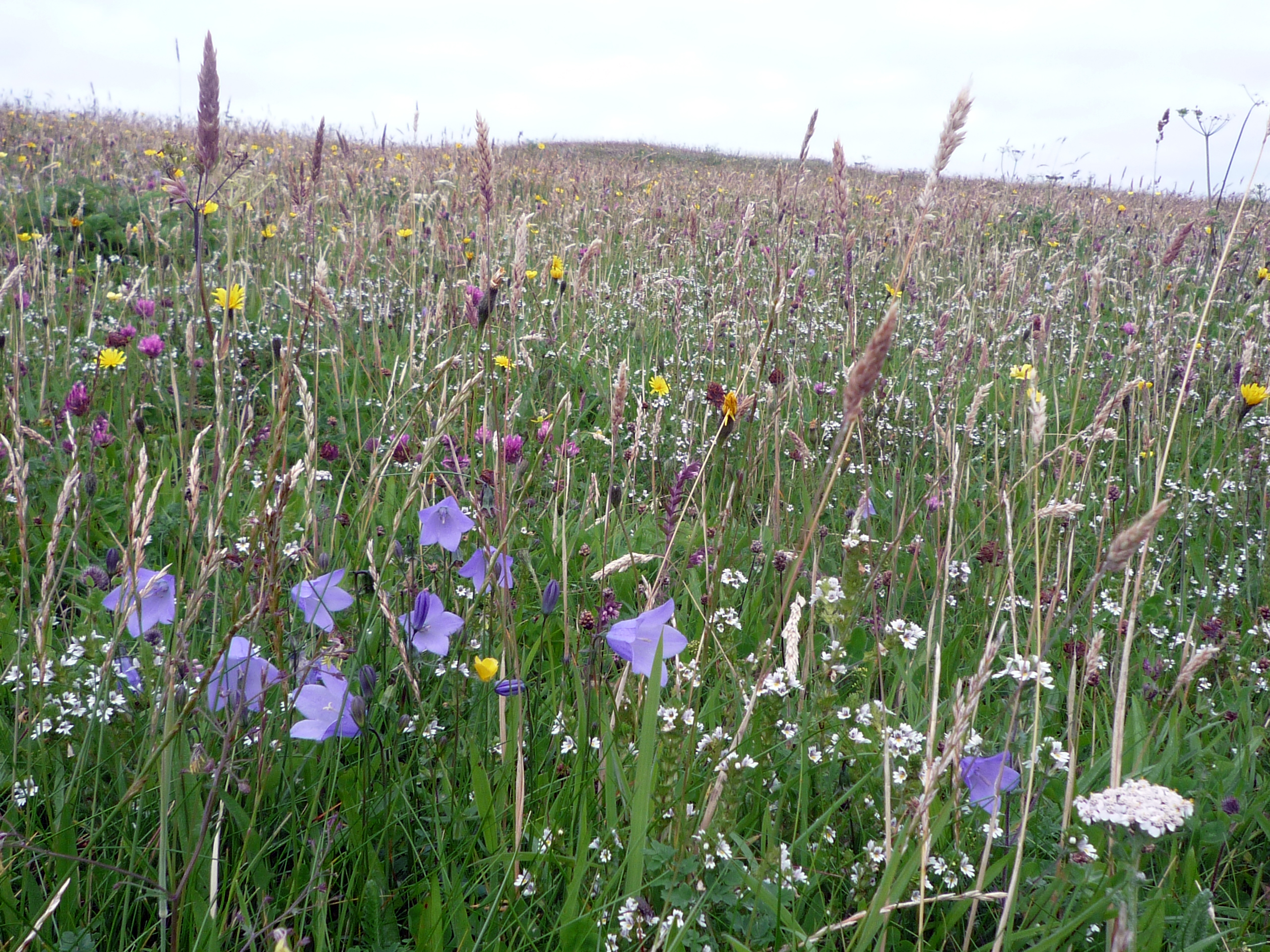
Wildflowers on a machair

=== Flora ===
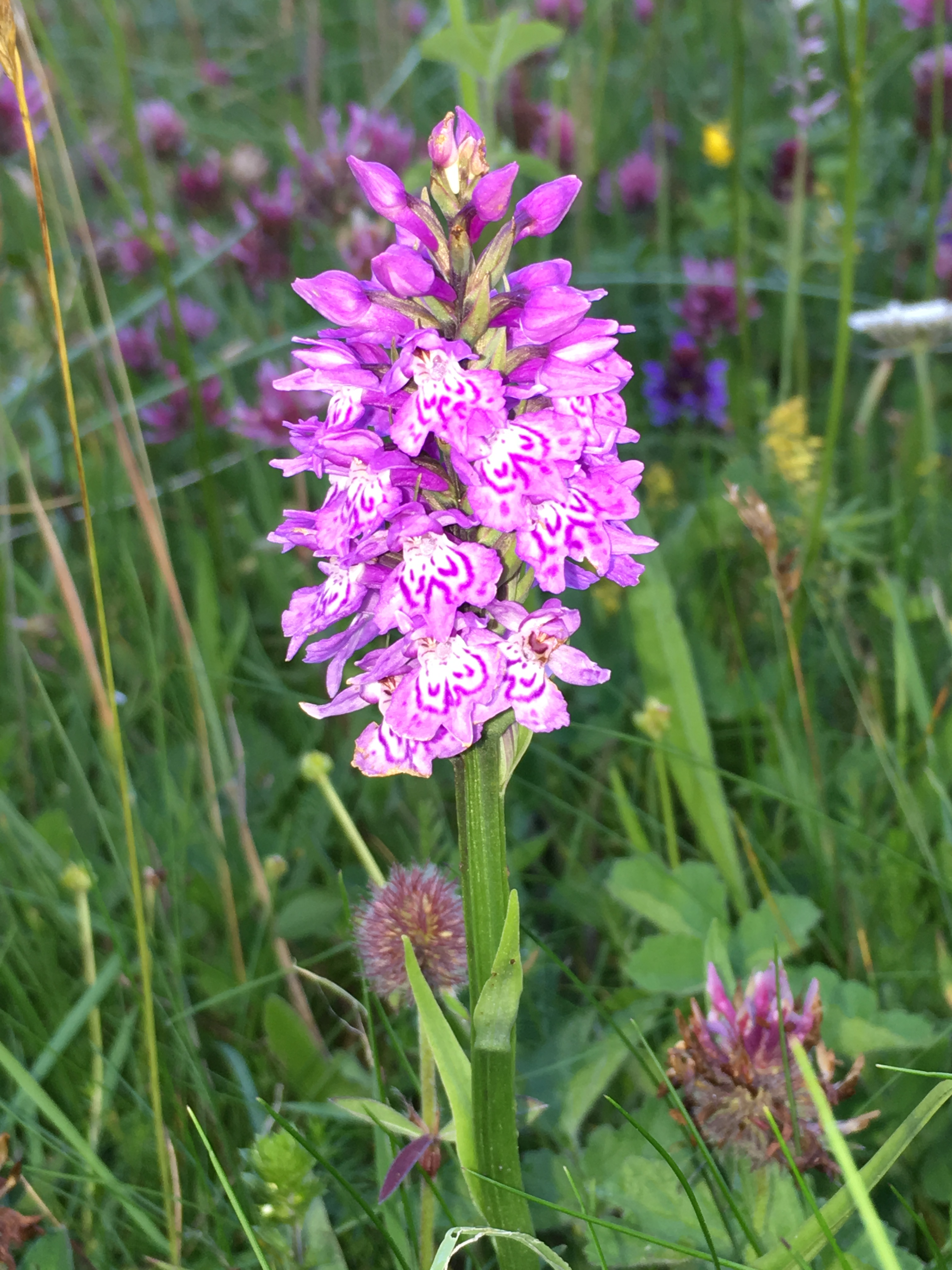
Hebridean spotted orchid

They can house rare carpet flowers, including orchids such as Irish lady's tresses and the Hebridean spotted orchid and other plants such as the yellow rattle.

=== Fauna ===
Bird species including the corn crake, twite, dunlin, common redshank and ringed plover, as well as rare insects such as the northern colletes bee, the great yellow bumblebee (Bombus distinguendus) and the moss carder bee (Bombus muscorum), are found there.

=== Threats ===
Arable and fallow machair is threatened by changes in land management, where the original system of crofts is under threat from a reduction in the number of crofters and the use of "modern" techniques. Changes in the Common Agricultural Policy, which decoupled production from subsidies, reduced the amount of grazing taking place in many crofting areas, and led to some areas being undergrazed or abandoned. A lack of native seed increases the need for fertiliser and herbicides.

Rising sea levels, a consequence of global warming, also pose a threat to low-lying coastal areas, leading to increased erosion. In January 1993, the storm which ran MV Braer aground off Shetland eroded 3 metres (9.8 feet) of machair along the entire length of Uist and Barra. On 11/12 January 2005, a storm blew consistently in excess of hurricane force 12, destroying hectares of machair.
