= Ensay, Outer Hebrides =

Island in the Outer Hebrides of Scotland

Ensay
Easaigh (Gaelic)

Location
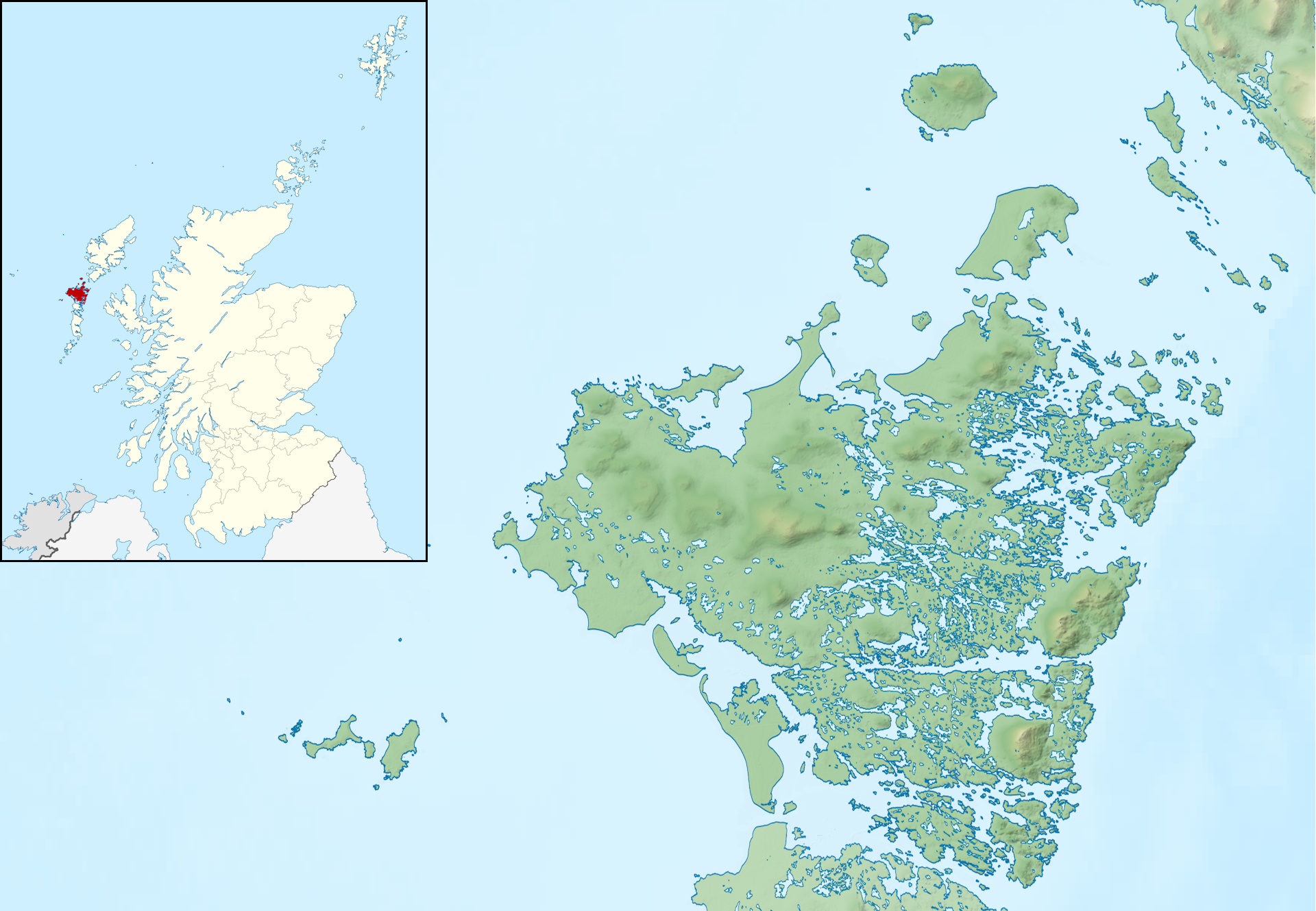
- Ensay shown next to North Uist Ensay shown within the Outer Hebrides
- OS grid reference: NF977862
- Coordinates: 57.76°N 7.08°W

Name
- Name meaning: Old Norse: Ewe Island

Physical geography
- Island group: Outer Hebrides
- Area: 186 ha (3/4 sq mi)
- Area rank: 113
- Highest elevation: 49 m (161 ft)

Administration
- Council area: Na h-Eileanan Siar
- Country: Scotland
- Sovereign state: United Kingdom

Demographics
- Population: 0

Ensay (Gaelic Easaigh) is a currently unpopulated and privately owned island in the Outer Hebrides of Scotland. The island lies in the Sound of Harris, between the islands of Harris and Berneray. The name originates from the Old Norse for Ewe Island. It has nothing to do with the Gaelic for Jesus, "Iosa," as sometimes stated.

Although the island has had no permanent population since the 1930s, it is still used for summer grazing. The small chapel of Christ Church is maintained, and services are held biannually. The island is classified by the National Records of Scotland as an inhabited island that "had no usual residents at the time of either the 2001 or 2011 censuses."

The town of Ensay in Victoria, Australia, was named after this island by one of the early settlers, a Scotsman named Archibald Macleod: "This same Macleod named "Ensay" after the home of his aunt, who was married to Campbell of Ensay, with whom, I believe, Archibald Macleod, who named both Orbost and Ensay in Gippsland, frequently stayed when a lad, and probably had happy memories of the little island."

== History ==
The island shows signs of Stone Age habitation, with a prominent standing stone. Human bone from a burial in a midden site near the Manish Strand has been dated to the range 1000-820 BCE. It has a share of the general history of Harris, though it is not covered in the standard work by Bill Lawson. In 1549 Sir Donald Monro, High Dean of the Isles, visited the island and wrote of "ane Ile callit Enisay, quhairin M^{c}cloyd of Harey hes a dwelling place, ane fair mayne land, weill inhabite and manurit [= cultivated] ane mile lang, half mile braid". It was also described by Martin Martin in 1716: "BETWEEN Bernera and the main Land of Harries lies the Iſland of Enʃay, which is above two miles in Circumference, and for the moſt part arable Ground, which is fruitful in Corn and Graſs: there is an old Chappel here, for the uſe of the Natives; and there was lately diſcover'd a Grave in the Weſt end of the Iſland, in which was found a pair of Scales made of Braſs and a little Hammer, both which were finely poliſh'd."

The MacLeod chiefs of Dunvegan in Skye held Ensay and other islands as part of the lands of the Estate of Harris until 1779, when the Harris lands, together with the islands of St. Kilda and Berneray, were sold to a near relative, Captain Alexander MacLeod. In 1790 they were inherited by his son Alexander Hume (MacLeod) who sold St Kilda separately in 1804, and the remainder passed in 1811 to his grandson Alexander Norman MacLeod. In 1834 the bankrupt Estate of Harris was sold to the Earl of Dunmore.

In 1856 Ensay, Pabbay and some small islets were sold to Archibald Stewart (1789-1880), tacksman of Eilanreach in Skye. Archibald died on Ensay and left his Estate to his nephew John Stewart (1826-1899) who was described as "JOHN STEWART, Scorrybreck, formerly at Duntulm, Proprietor of Ensay" when he was examined at the Napier Commission Hearings in Portree on May 23, 1883.

John Stewart left the estate to his son William (1852-1907), who was a military officer and Secretary of the Piobaireachd Society. John's younger son Donald Alexander Stewart (1856-1935) of Lochdhu, was already the tenant for the grazings, and continued so after his brother's death in 1907.

William's will was complicated. He gave the property to his nephew George Fraser(b. 1884), a son of his sister Isabella Fraser (1854-1904) on condition that he adopt the name "William Stewart". He also gave a life-rent of the property to his recently widowed sister Jessie Scott (1859-1930) and his unmarried sister Jane (1850-1933). About 1931 there was a minor change to the property when the medieval chapel near Ensay House, restored by Jessie Scott about 1909-10, was made over in her will to the Diocese of Argyll and the Isles of the Episcopal Church of Scotland.

By 1937 the only survivor of these arrangements was William George Fraser Stewart, who sold the property to Simon McKenzie. By 1989 it had passed to Simon's son John.

In 1958 there was another subdivision of the property when Ensay House was sold to Dr John David.

== Ensay House ==
A gazetteer for Scotland states that Ensay House (Taigh Easaigh) was built in the Edwardian period. It may be that some parts were modified at this time, but as noted earlier there was already a residence suitable for a chief on the island by 1549. There was certainly a substantial residence built by 1803, when the writer and shepherd James Hogg was visiting Harris with a view to sub-leasing a farm at Luskentyre and stayed several days with the tacksman Angus Campbell at his house on Ensay. Hogg writes: "You are still to suppose me in the house and island of Ensay; the former is large and commodious" Hogg also notes that "... one day ...the Table was surrounded by a dozen of Gentlemen and four ladies ..." and later that Campbell went "up Stairs" to dress for breakfast, so the house at that time clearly had a commodious dining room and an upper storey. A "mansion house" is shown at the same location in the 1805 Estate map of the Harris Estate prepared for Alexander Hume (MacLeod) by the cartographer William Bald. The 1829 reprint of this map at the National Library of Scotland also shows "Sold to Stewart" or "Stewart" as pencilled annotations against Ensay, Pabbay and some islets, so presumably it had been used in the Dunmore Estate Office around 1856.

Archibald Stewart had substantial additions made to Ensay House before he retired to the island in the 1870s. On 13 July 1870 the excise man Alexander Carmichael noted that Archibald "had made good additions to a fine house but that it was too close to the bay - 'This is its only fault'". A Gaelic poem about the new house has been attributed to Neil Morrison, the Pabbay Bard (b. 1816) by the scholar George Henderson and a slightly different version appears in Appendix B of with an English translation by Simon Mackenzie.

In his 1933 book of travels in the Hebrides the writer Alasdair Alpin MacGregor provided a detailed account of his stay at Ensay House, when the proprietor was "Willie Stewart" (William George Fraser Stewart, b. 1884, whose older brother John Stewart Gordon Fraser, DSO was a grandfather of the BBC broadcaster and presenter Ed Stewart).

In about 1958 the house was purchased by Dr. John Brooke David (1912-1980), for whom it was a holiday place, since he worked in Ghana. In 1975 he loaned the house to the writer Ken Duxbury, who lived there for six months and dedicated the resulting book to Dr. David. Duxbury described the work of repairing the kind of dilapidation that might be expected after so many years out of regular use, but it seems the magic remained, since he described Ensay as a "paradise" that included:

...a small semicircular sandy bay, with a house at its head so old and full of character that it breathed history, and ages of work and love of the land, success and disaster ... (p. 88).

After Dr. David's death, his extended family continued to own, look after, and use the house, including re-slating, but by the time of the 2012 photo-essay by John Maher the interior was in serious need of more attention, some of which was addressed via crowd funding in 2018.

== Ensay Highland cattle ==
In 1870 Alexander Carmichael also noted the "beautiful" black cattle on Ensay. Archibald Stewart and his brothers Alexander and Donald came from cattle country in Fortingall, and maintained folds of prize-winning West Highland cattle at all their tenancies from the early 1800s. Most of those appearing in the list of winners at shows of the Royal Highland and Agricultural Society of Scotland pre-date the creation of a herd book for the breed in 1885 but a search for animal names that include "ENSAY" finds 15 beasts born between 1862 and 1892 where the Owner and Breeder is recorded as "DA Stewart of Lochdhu". This Donald (1856-1935) was a grand-nephew of Archibald who lived mainly on his property in Nairn, but leased Ensay from about 1900 to 1935, during the ownership of other family members.

== Ensay Chapels ==
Most modern accounts of Ensay only mention the restored chapel near Ensay House, which is probably the "old Chappel ... for the uſe of the Natives" mentioned by Martin in 1716, rather than the sand-buried chapel near the Manish burial ground, which is presumably where Martin's "...Grave in the Weſt end of the Iſland, in which was found a pair of Scales made of Braſs and a little Hammer" was located. It is best to treat them separately, and refer to the latter as the Manish Chapel, following the name given by AEW Miles (1989), its discoverer and so far its only investigator. The former is most appropriately known by the name used by the Diocese of Argyll and The Isles of the Scottish Episcopal Church in the first available version of its website captured the Wayback Machine on 8 July 2008: "Harris - Christ Church". Only key points from that history are presented here.

=== Christ Church Chapel ===
About 1909 Mrs Jessie Scott, one of the members of the Stewart family who owned Ensay, decided to have the old chapel beside Ensay House restored and returned to its original purpose. The first entry in the register is for 14 October 1910 and there were services from then until 1914. There were no recorded services during the First World War, but the church re-opened and periodic services continued until 1935. When Jessie Scott died in 1931 her will made over the chapel and its contents to the Bishop of Argyll & The Isles, together with a small sum to endow the upkeep.

Part of this restoration was a stone plaque over the entry door, which was photographed during a RCAHMS field trip in 2012. The engraving of the image is hard to read but the Gaelic text and a translation into English may be found in Macgregor or Calhoun.

In the early 1950s the chapel was again restored, as recorded in a plaque inside: "THIS CHAPEL WAS RESTORED BY JOHN BROOKE DAVID FRCS, OF ENSAY HOUSE, LONDON AND ACCRA, BEFORE HE DIED 30TH SEPTEMBER 1979."

In 1973 the chapel was re-dedicated by the Bishop of Argyll and the Isles.

Since 2018 "The Friends of Ensay" SCIO (Scottish Charity No SCO48647) has as its objectives:

"4.1 the advancement of the arts, heritage, unique history and culture of the island of Ensay in the Outer Hebrides in addition to the preservation, maintenance, restoration, upkeep and use of the historic Ensay Chapel and grounds. 4.2 the advancement of citizenship and greater community involvement through the promotion of volunteering to care for and celebrate the unique character and situation of Ensay Chapel, and to promote greater public understanding and pride in the local heritage of Ensay. and 4.3 the advancement of religion through the organising of an annual pilgrimage and worship services in the Ensay Chapel conducted by the Episcopal Church."

In 2021 it was reported that the ownership of Ensay chapel had been transferred from the Argyll and The Isles diocese of the Scottish Episcopal Church to the Friends of Ensay SCIO, and that they were seeking support to assist with raising funds for the building and its upkeep.

=== Manish Chapel ===
This building was found during the rescue archaeology on the Manish Burial Ground: "In 1971, a short length of drystone walling had become exposed, which on exploration was found to be the top of the east gable end of a building with external dimensions about 7.2 m x 4.6 m and with a closely east-west orientation."

== The Manish Burial Ground ==
In 1870 Alexander Carmichael had noted that the island had no burial ground although it used to be at Trai Mhanuis [Tràigh Mhanuis]. The exhaustive rescue investigation of this burial ground conducted by Professor A E W Miles and his colleagues from 1966 and published in 1989 was triggered by the grass cover in the area being broken about 1963, followed by rapid wind erosion that exposed the graves. In what follows, page references are all to that publication. Only one grave had an identified occupant: the 19th century railed grave (see below) that was badly damaged, so that the sealed coffin came to the surface and had to be re-interred in 1969 and 1980(pp. 8–9).

Permission to rescue and study the human remains was given by the Rev. J. Smith of the Presbytery, Lochmaddy (p191). At the first visit in 1966, "the site was a more or less flat area of bare sand littered with human bones ... at the centre, there was a 3m high grass-topped hummock from the sandy sides of which projected bones at lower levels and coffins at higher levels." By the time of publication, the site had eroded about 5m below the level of the original grass cover (p9), and the remains of about 416 individuals had been rescued, and their burials approximately dated to the ranges:1800 AD to recent (111);1700-1800 AD (71); 1600-1700 AD (88); and 1500-1600 AD (146).(p. 26). The site "corresponds in position with the burial ground marked as a small circle on the earliest 6-inch to the mile Ordnance Survey map of 1878 (published 1882)." (p8). This can easily be viewed nowadays via the National Library of Scotland Georeferenced maps.

The writer Ken Duxbury describes an unexpected encounter with some of the documented and wrapped remains in storage at Ensay House during his six month stay on the island in 1975, noting that "they were ready for reinternment when opportunity offered, hence the careful parcelling of bone with fellow bone, all meticulously marked".

It is unclear what happened after the 1989 publication, which concluded with two paragraphs on "The Future of the Site": "... The immediate problem is the prevention of further deterioration of the chapel ... A longer term aim is to excavate the chapel in order to establish its date ... The level surrounding the chapel prior to the sandblows could be profitably explored especially on the south side where interments contemporary with the use of the chapel can be predicted. ..." (p. 185)

None of this seems to have happened by the time Professor Miles died in 2008. As late as 1998 there was a hand-lettered sign on railings above the burial ground stating:

"This site is the ancient burial ground of the island, year by year more exposed by wind erosion. The area has been registered by the authorities in Edinburgh as an Ancient Monument of considerable importance and therefore may not be excavated without permission.

Every year human remains become exposed and, since 1966, are regularly rescued and cared for by Professor Miles of the Royal College of Surgeons in London. The building at the centre came to light in 1971 and is a chapel, thought to be of the 14th century, which became buried by sand blows in the 16th century.

Please do not move any bones or pottery that may be exposed and please only walk over the site with care."

There is no sign on the railings shown in a photograph taken during a Field Visit to Ensay by the RCAHMS [Now HES] archaeologist Dr George F Geddes in Jun 2012. The same photographs show grass cover over the area in 1998 and 2012, as do current (but undated) satellite images, so perhaps the risk of further wind erosion has been reduced.

=== The Railed Grave ===
The railings of a 19th-century grave enclosure appear in most photos of the Manish Burial Ground. The grave is that of Donald Stewart (1816-1887), who was the son and heir of Donald Stewart (1774-1854), and since it is necessary to refer to both, it is simplest to refer to father and son as Donald (I) and Donald (II) respectively. Donald (I) was tenant of Luskentyre in Harris from 1811–12 and of other properties in Harris and Lewis but never of Ensay. He was appointed as Factor to Alexander Norman MacLeod of Harris in 1816, was appointed by the Trustees of the bankrupt estate as Judicial Factor for the Ranking of creditors and Sale of the estate in 1830, which was achieved in 1834, after which he continued as the main tenant but was not Factor to the Earls of Dunmore. In 1848 he did not renew his tenancies in Harris and moved to the mainland.

There is a tradition or folk-tale in Harris about the two Donalds, which seems to have been first recorded by Alexander Carmichael in 1870: "... he [Donald (I)] used fifty or sixty soldiers to clear people to the disgust of one of his sons who would have nothing to do with Stewart and became a missionary." The only time troops were called in to Harris was to support the Borve evictions of 1839 after an original notice at the set of Harris in 1837 (for entry in 1838) and a 12 month extension, and it was the Dunmore Estate that chose to clear the smallholders from the Borves rather than lose Donald(I) as a tenant. As re-told 110 years later, the story is much longer, and leads into a kind of explanation for the burial on Ensay:

"According to Harris tradition, Donald, the young son of the "big ruddy haired Stewart" (An Stiùbhartach mór ruadh) asked his father why he was so desperately keen to get rid of his neighbours in the farm of Borve. He received the short answer. "Theagamh gu deanamh e tàc dhuit fein" — surely it would make a tack for yourself. "Gu gleidheadh Dia thu" May God protect you replied the son and forthwith left Harris for Australia. ... He came to the conclusion that God had preserved him for some higher purpose. He sold his farm and returned to Harris, where he became a zealous and much loved missionary of the Gospel. When he died he was not buried in the family chapel in Luskintyre: his remains were interred in the lonely island of Ensay in the Sound of Harris.".

There is no "family chapel" at Luskentyre, but there is a small walled enclosure at the south-eastern corner of the Luskentyre Old Cemetery that contains memorials to the first three Stewart proprietors of Ensay and other family members. It can be seen on the georeferenced maps at the National Library of Scotland and on Google Streetview.

Donald (II) is listed as an "Evangelist" in the Dunoon Postal Directories in the 1880s, and his obituaries refer to his work in this field. None of them mention a sojourn in Australia or a life-changing encounter with a snake, but his older brother Dr Robert Stewart (1833 – 1851) gave up the lease of a property in Harris in 1837 to travel to Australia as Surgeon-superintendent of emigrants on the Mid-Lothian. It is possible that these events became entangled in Harris tradition.

Whether he went to Australia or not, Donald (II) was undoubtedly in Scotland by 1854, as he was heir to the remainder of his father's tack of Achintee, and subsequently was tacksman of Auchindaul/Auchnadaull. in the Great Glen.

At the Glasgow hearings of the Napier Commission on October 20, 1883, he read a statement responding to allegations made at the Tarbert Hearings of the commission, in relation to his father. The "Harris tradition", whether noted in 1870 or 1980, is entirely inconsistent with his answers to the Commissioners at paragraphs 44873 and 44874.

== Gallery ==
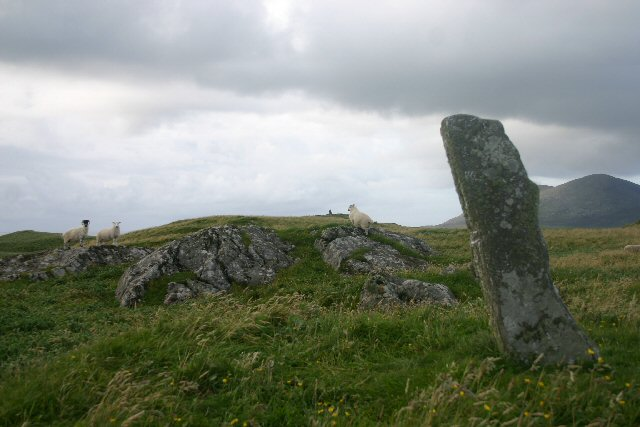
Standing Stone

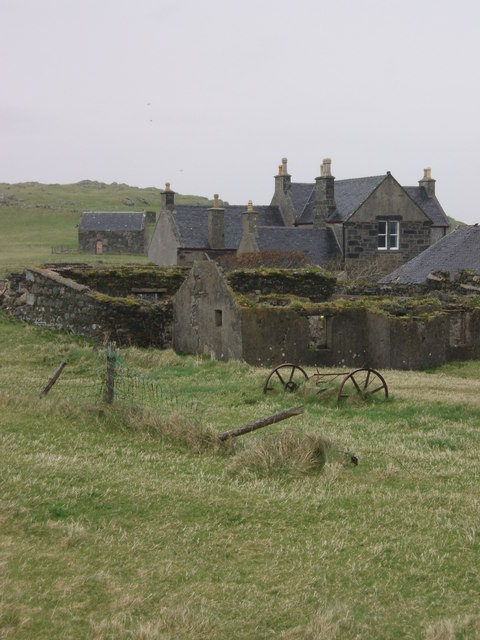
Taigh Easaigh
