= Leverburgh =

Coordinates: 57.767°N 7.021°W

Leverburgh: Scottish Gaelic: An t-Òb
- Village
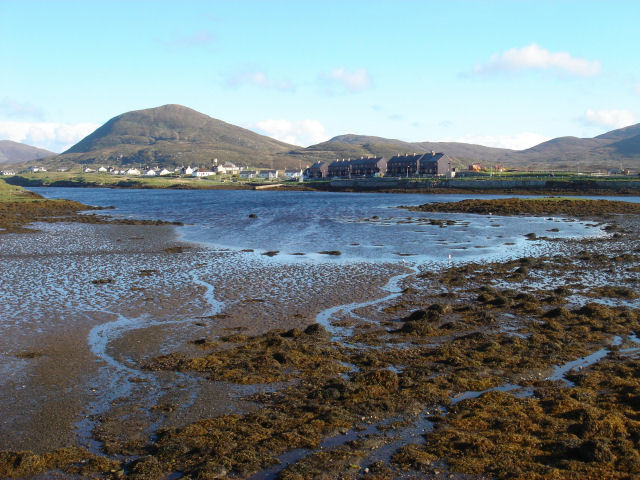
- Most of the houses in Leverburgh are spread out along the eastern side of the A859

- Location within the Outer Hebrides
- Language: Scottish Gaelic; English
- OS grid reference: NG014863
- Community council: South Harris
- Council area: Na h-Eileanan Siar
- Lieutenancy area: Western Isles
- Country: Scotland
- Sovereign state: United Kingdom
- Post town: ISLE OF HARRIS
- Postcode district: HS5
- Dialling code: 01859
- Police: Scotland
- Fire: Scottish
- Ambulance: Scottish
- UK Parliament: Na h-Eileanan an Iar
- Scottish Parliament: Na h-Eileanan an Iar

Leverburgh (Note: Scottish Gaelic: An t-Òb [ən̪ˠ ˈt̪ɔːp]) is the second largest village, after Tarbert, in the Isle of Harris in the Outer Hebrides of Scotland. Leverburgh is within the parish of Harris. In 1971 it had a population of 223.

== History ==
In his 30s, English businessman William Lever, 1st Viscount Leverhulme had taken a boat trip and fallen in love with the Western Isles of Scotland. In May 1918, at the age of 66, he bought the Isle of Lewis for £167,000, convinced that he could resurrect the fishing industry. But his investment floundered in 1919 when servicemen, demobilised from the First World War and promised land, started occupying plots on the Isle of Lewis. Leverhulme protested and took legal action against the people he considered squatters, but the Scottish Office took the side of the ex-servicemen, leaving Leverhulme's plan in tatters.

Still looking to develop his fishing plan, in late 1919 he purchased the South Harris estate from the Earl of Dunmore for the sum of £36,000. Taking in the fishing village of Obbe (deriving from a Norse word for a bay), he planned to turn it into a consolidated major fishing centre, with fish distributed through the 400+ Mac Fisheries fishmonger shops. He chose the site because it gave access to the waters of both the Minch and the Atlantic Ocean and his boats could always find sheltered fishing waters.

Nigel Nicolson, in his book Lord of the Isles, (Weidenfeld and Nicolson, 1960), writes: "Leverhulme did not search long for the site of his harbour. He found it at Obbe. It was a pity that he and his advisers did not give the matter further thought before embarking on the engineering works, for Obbe was not the best possible site. Tarbert would have been preferable, for it had deep sheltered water, and it would not have been beyond Leverhulme's scope to dig a canal through the narrow isthmus linking the East and West Lochs Tarbert, and so provide his boats with access to the seas on both sides of the Hebrides. This proposal was urged on him at an early stage by Duncan Maciver; and his personal representative in Lewis, Colonel Walter Lindsay (who had apparently not heard of Maciver's idea), raised it again in October 1920. "It struck me yesterday," he wrote to Leverhulme, "that it would be a great advantage if a canal could be cut at Tarbert, as there is extremely good anchorage in both lochs." But it was in that very month that work at Leverburgh began in earnest. Why Leverhulme discarded the obvious claims of a Tarbert canal is not clear. Perhaps he feared its proximity to Stornoway, or did not wish to harm the interests of the thriving community of fishermen on the isle of Scalpay at the entrance to the east loch. Or perhaps it was for the more personal reason that once the decision had been taken to rechristen Obbe "Leverburgh", it became unthinkable to abandon it."

In 1920, with local consent, Obbe was renamed Leverburgh, and 300 men started work on a new pier and seashore infrastructure for processing the catch from 50 berthed trawlers. Shore side construction covered an accommodation block, curing sheds, smoke houses, a refrigeration building, store sheds, houses for the managers and a twenty car garage.

With a second stage of development planned that would have seen the inner sea loch converted into a harbour to accommodate 200+ trawlers, fitted with a sea lock to ensure a constant 25-foot (7.6-metre) depth, Leverhulme paid for upgraded roads to accommodate the additional traffic.

After purchasing the London butchers Wall's in 1920, the economic downturn of 1920–1921 slowed development, resulting in the London-based Mac Fisheries being incorporated into Lever Brothers Ltd in 1922. By 1924 Leverburgh was ready to start production, and 12 Great Yarmouth drifters landed a quantity of herring so great that extra female employees were taken in from the mainland to handle the catch.

After making his last visit to Leverburgh in September 1924, Leverhulme took a trip to Africa, where he developed pneumonia. After his death in 1925, his executors and the board of Lever Brothers had no interest in the Leverburgh project, and so ended all work. They sold off the village and production facilities for £5,000, and the estate for £300, to the Campbell brothers, a local family. It is estimated that the project cost Leverhulme £500,000 (equivalent to £26,281,808 in 2025).

== Facilities ==
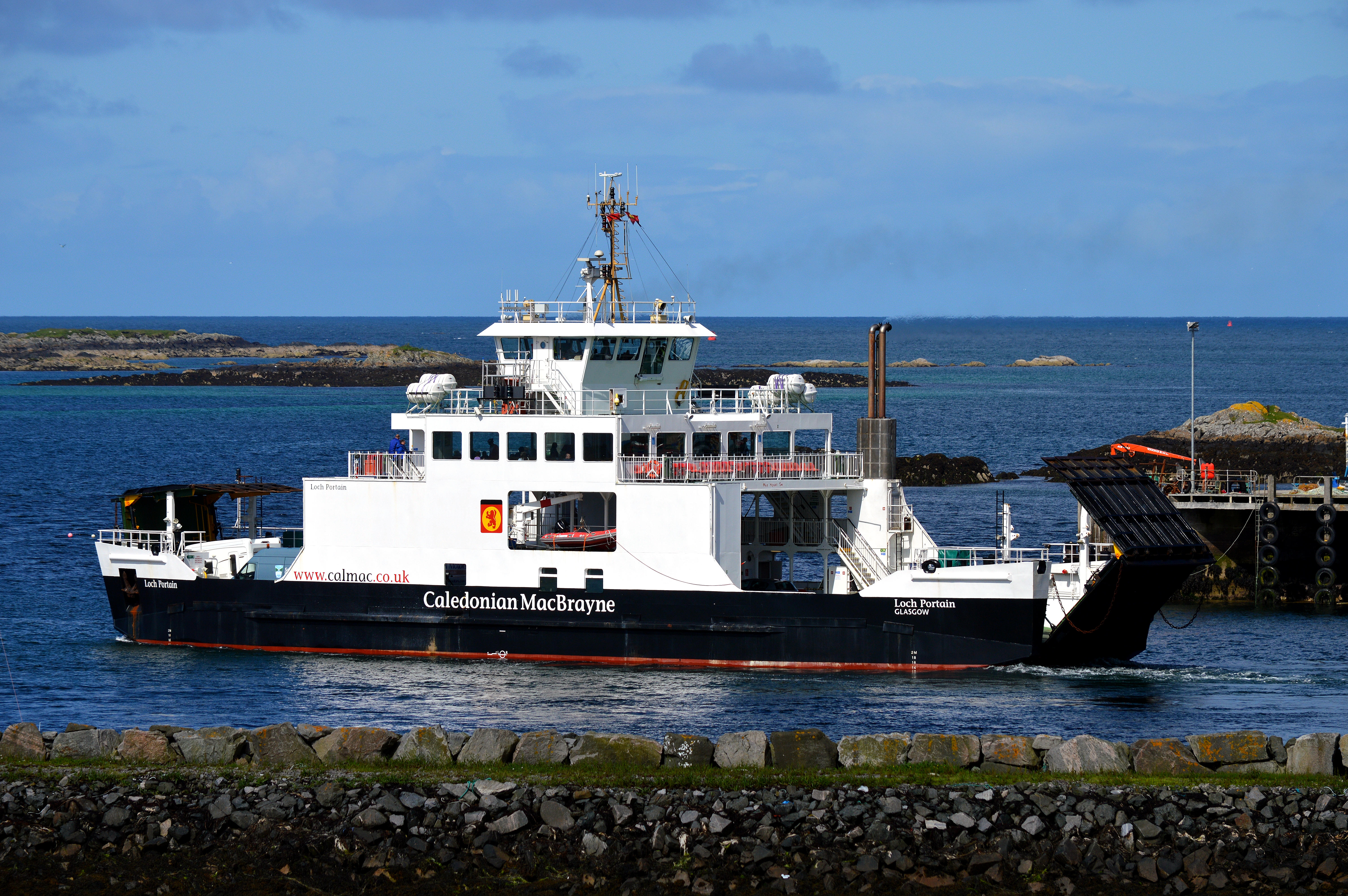
MV Loch Portain departing Leverburgh, 15 July 2015

A Caledonian MacBrayne ferry service links Leverburgh with Berneray, connected to North Uist by a causeway.

The Post Office serving the village was established in 1873 and had its name changed from Obbe to Leverburgh in December 1920.

The nearby area is known for its beautiful beaches, especially along the west coast road.

== See also ==
- Lusanga, Kwilu, formerly Leverville
- Port Sunlight
