= Otternish =

Coordinates: 57.698°N 7.193°W

Otternish: Scottish Gaelic: Otairnis
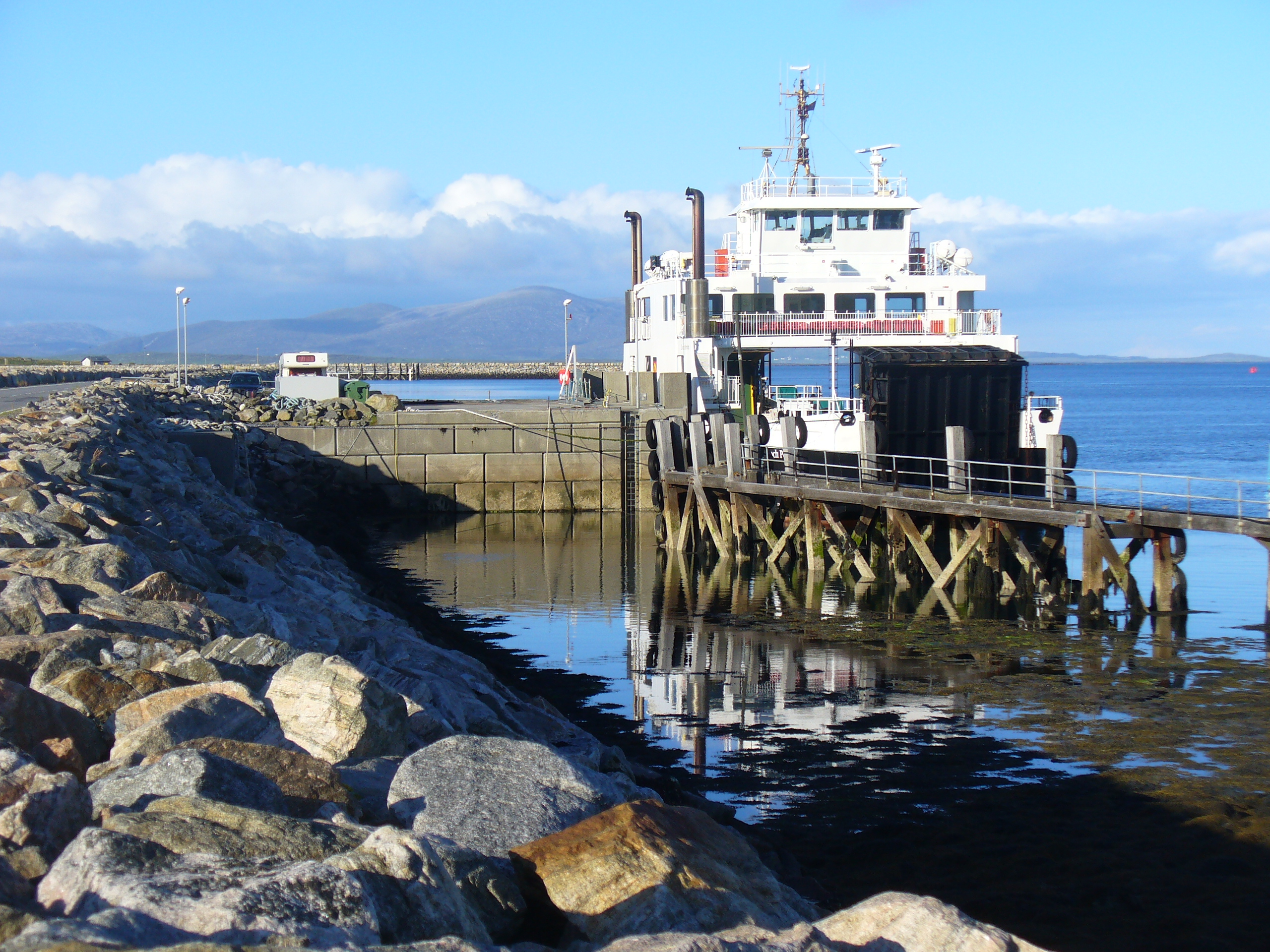
- MV Loch Portain moored for the night at Otternish.

- Location within the Outer Hebrides
- OS grid reference: NF906794
- Civil parish: North Uist
- Council area: Na h-Eileanan Siar
- Country: Scotland
- Sovereign state: United Kingdom
- Post town: ISLE OF NORTH UIST
- Postcode district: HS6
- Dialling code: 01876
- Police: Scotland
- Fire: Scottish
- Ambulance: Scottish
- UK Parliament: Na h-Eileanan an Iar
- Scottish Parliament: Na h-Eileanan an Iar

Otternish is the former North Uist terminal for the ferry to Berneray, in the Outer Hebrides, Scotland. The slipway lies 6 miles (10 km) north of Lochmaddy, and is situated within the parish of North Uist. Otternish is situated on the B893, and when the Berneray causeway was completed in December 1998, the slipway was no longer needed. Ancient human remains were found here in 1870. At a site 50 yards to the north of the discovery, a Viking ship burial was also found in the early 20th century.
