= Berneray, North Uist =

Island in the Sound of Harris, Outer Hebrides, Scotland

Berneray
Beàrnaraigh (Gaelic)

Location
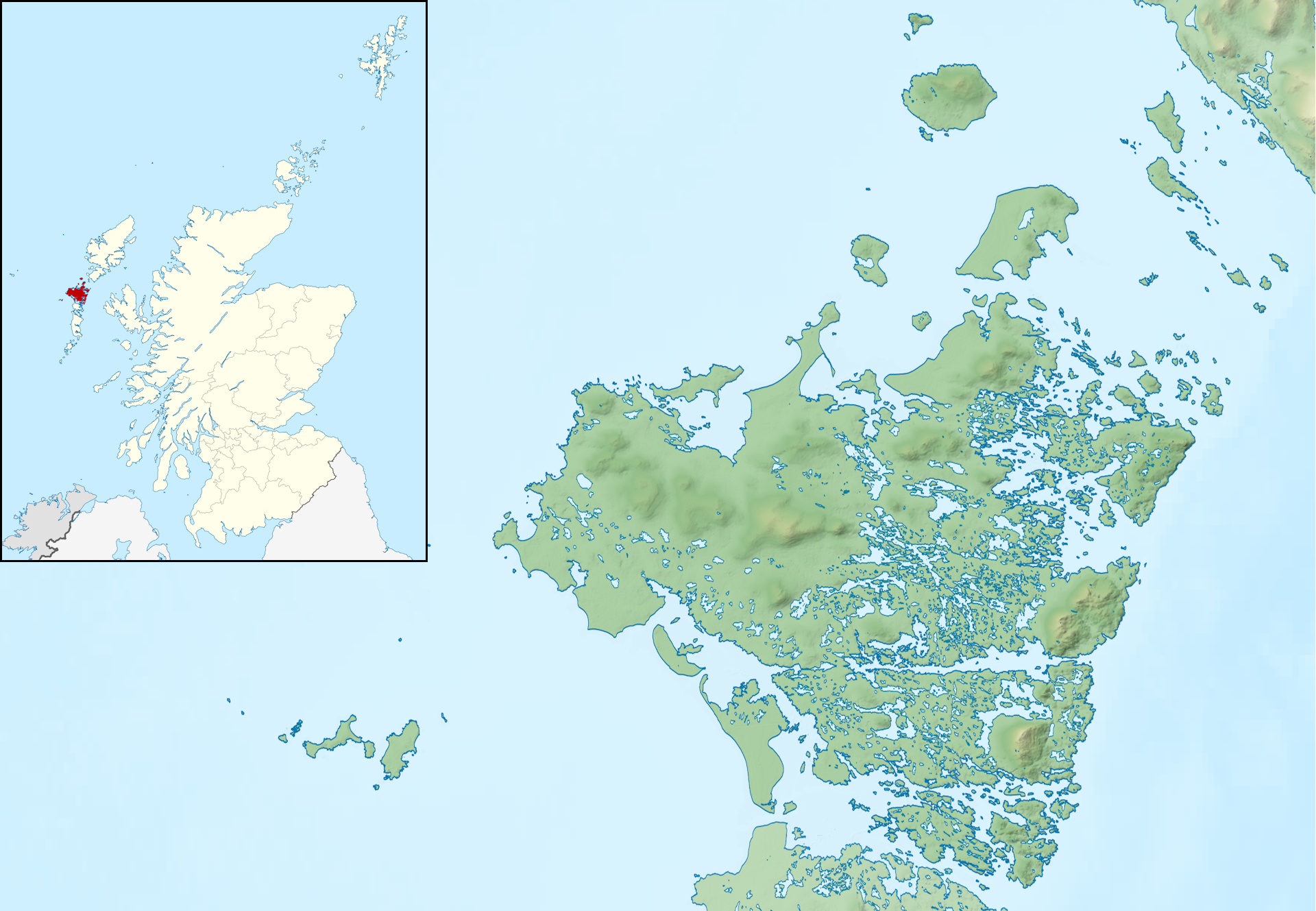
- Berneray shown next to North Uist Berneray shown within the Outer Hebrides
- OS grid reference: NF912817
- Coordinates: 57.72°N 7.19°W

Name
- Name meaning: From Old Norse Bjorn's island

Physical geography
- Island group: Uist and Barra
- Area: 1,010 ha (2,496 acres)
- Area rank: 50
- Highest elevation: Beinn Shlèibhe, 93 m (305 ft)

Administration
- Council area: Outer Hebrides
- Country: Scotland
- Sovereign state: United Kingdom

Demographics
- Population: 142
- Population rank: 41
- Population density: 14/km^{2} (36/sq mi)
- Largest settlement: Borve and Rushgarry

Berneray (Scottish Gaelic: Beàrnaraigh na Hearadh) is an island and community in the Sound of Harris, Scotland. It is one of fifteen inhabited islands in the Outer Hebrides. It is famed for its rich and colourful history which has attracted much tourism. It lies within the South Lewis, Harris and North Uist National Scenic Area, one of 40 such areas in Scotland which are defined so as to identify areas of exceptional scenery and to ensure its protection from inappropriate development.

With an area of 10.1 square kilometres (2,500 acres), Berneray rises to a height of 305 feet (93 m) at Beinn Shlèibhe (Moor Hill) and 278 feet (85 m) at Cnoc Bhuirgh (Borve Hill). It is known for its sandy beaches backed with sand dunes. Tràigh Iar (West Beach), a three-mile stretch of wide, clean and often deserted sand, is widely acclaimed.

There is strong evidence that points to Berneray being inhabited since the Bronze Age, and possibly before. The island is scattered with ancient sacred sites, stone circles, signs of Viking inhabitation and historical buildings, some several centuries old.

Although Berneray is geographically closer to North Uist, it is part of the Bays of Harris Estate and under the Parish of Harris.

== Etymology ==
The name "Berneray" is from the Old Norse Bjarnar-øy and means either "Bjorn's island" or possibly "bear island". This island is known by Gaelic speakers as Beàrnaraigh na Hearadh, meaning "Berneray of Harris" to distinguish it from Beàrnaraigh Cheann Bharraigh, literally "Berneray of Barra Head", now usually known in English simply as Barra Head and Beàrnaraigh Leòdhais, known as Great Bernera. More recently Gaelic speakers have also used Beàrnaraigh Uibhist, i.e. "Berneray of Uist" to refer to the northern Berneray.

== Demographics ==
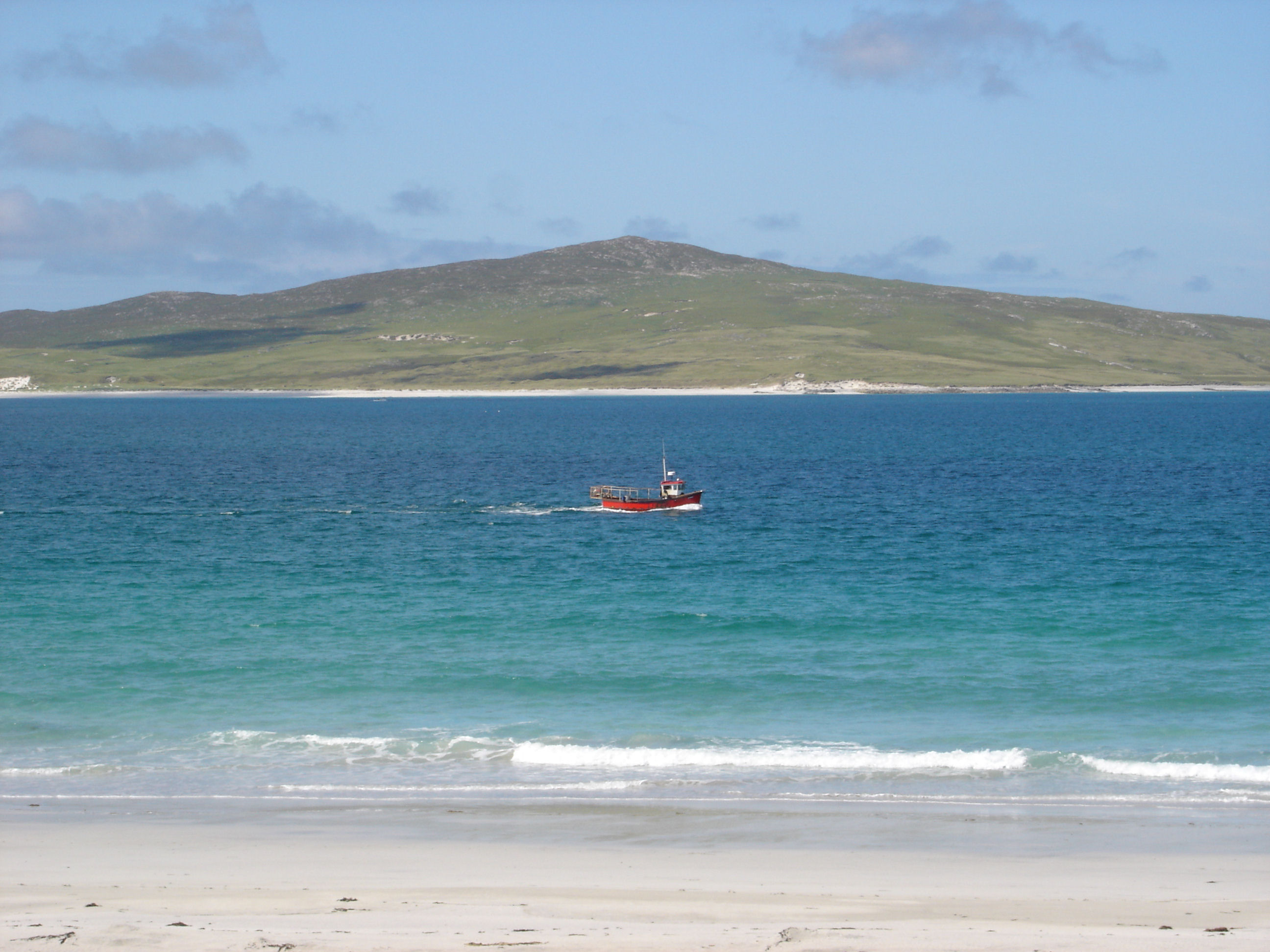
A fishing boat passes between the west beach of Berneray and the island of Pabbay

In common with most islands in the Outer Hebrides, the population declined during the 19th and 20th centuries. However, the past few years has seen a stabilisation. The island's population was 138 as recorded by the 2011 census a small rise since 2001 when there were 136 usual residents. During the same period Scottish island populations as a whole grew by 4% to 103,702. By 2022 the usually resident population was 142. Most people on Berneray speak Scottish Gaelic, many as a first language.

== Commerce and transport ==
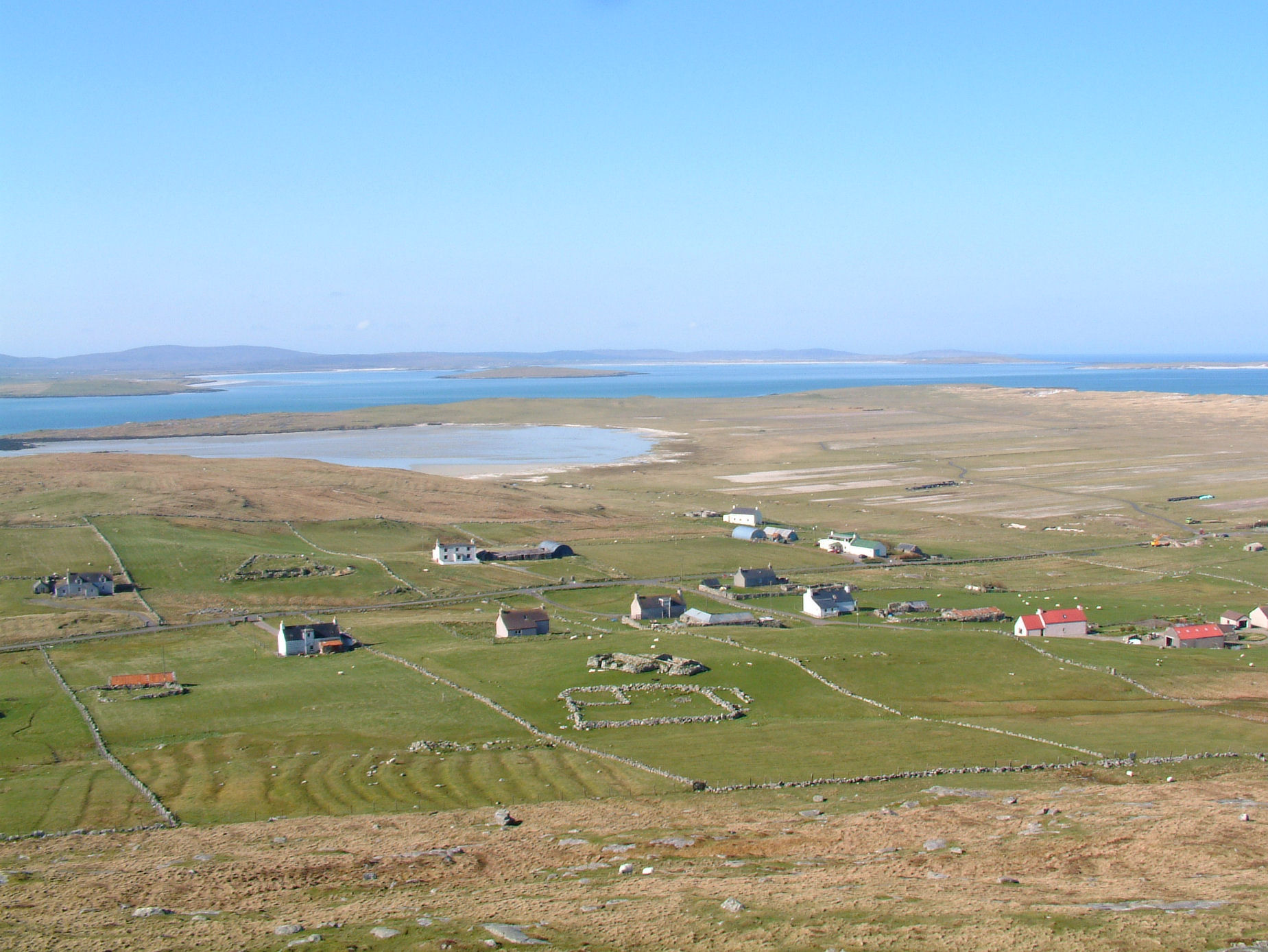
Borve and the machair

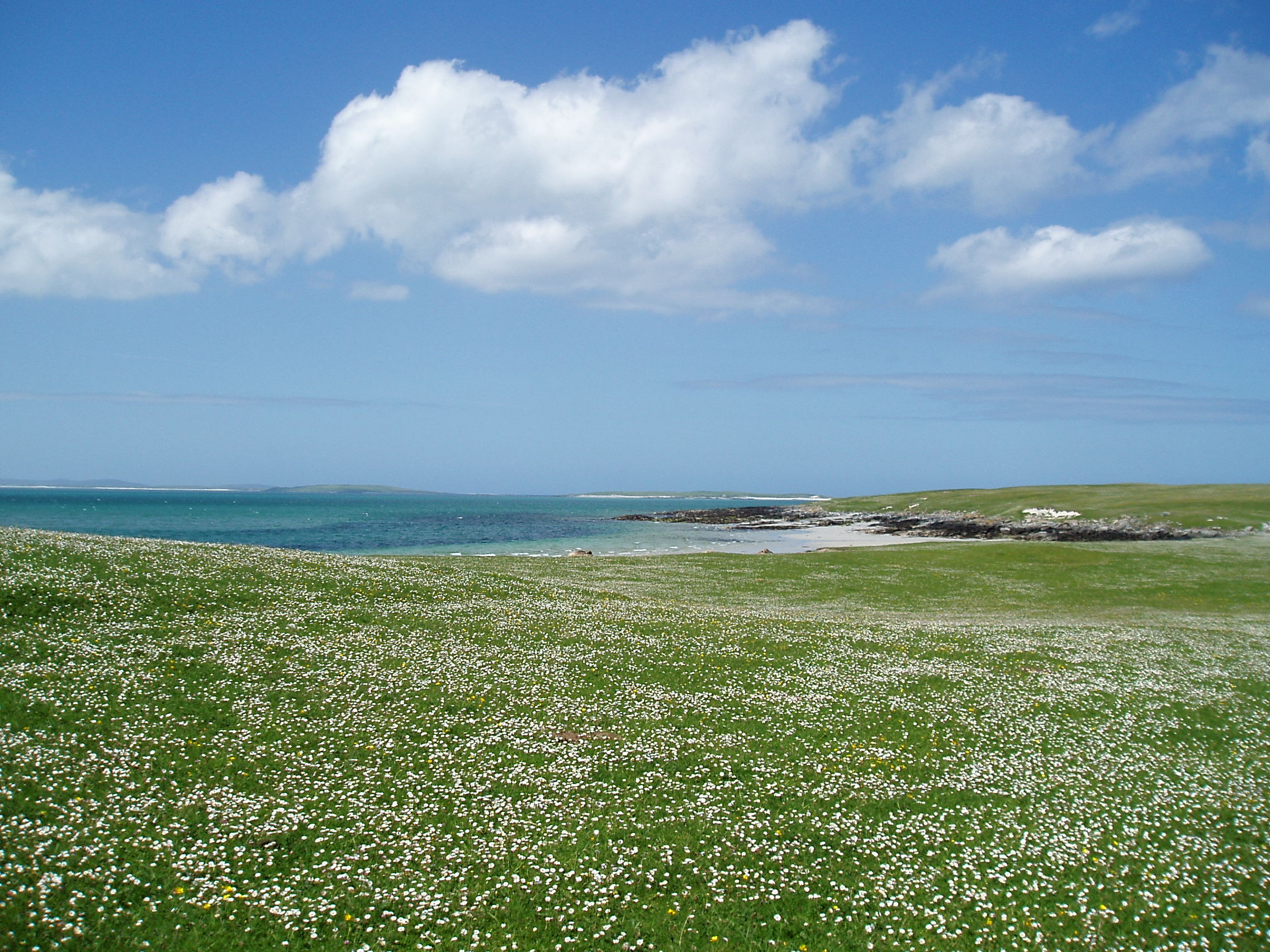
The Machair towards the West beach of Berneray

The main industries are fishing, crofting (small-scale individual farming), media/IT and tourism. Broadband internet provision became available in January 2006, giving an incentive to people wishing to relocate to Berneray and helping sustain the population and community.

A key feature of Berneray is its machair. The machair is a coastal plain made up of windblown shell sand. Traditional crofting practice, which involves summer agriculture using seaweed together with dung from winter grazing animals as natural fertiliser, has, over time, bound together and stabilised the land. The machair is ploughed in rotation, giving a patchwork of crops and fallow of different ages which supports a wide range of flowers. Berneray has a particularly fine machair, a result of careful husbandry by the island's crofters, helped by the absence of rabbits.

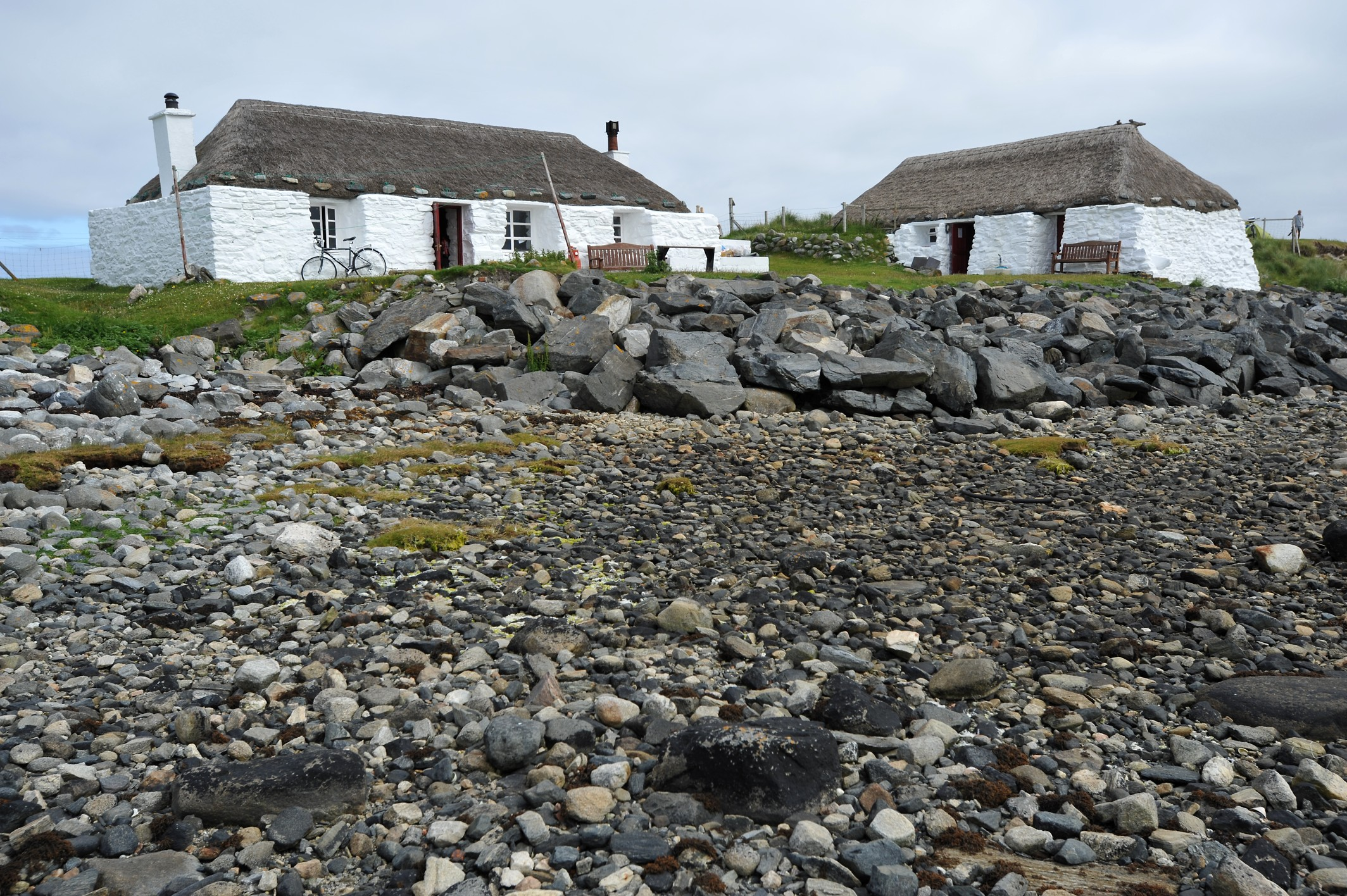
The youth hostel on Berneray

The youth hostel on Berneray is part of the Gatliff Hebridean Hostels Trust. The hostel consists of two restored black houses and is located at a magnificent setting overlooking the sound of Harris.

Possibly the greatest change in modern times occurred in 1999 when the causeway opened between Berneray and Otternish on North Uist. This has eased travelling on and off the island, improving employment prospects and accelerating the carriage of produce (notably, crabs and lobster). The causeway contains culverts that allow the easy passage of otters and fish from one side of the structure to the other. The causeway was formally opened by Prince Charles in April 1999. It is the first of a series of causeways connecting islands in the area. The North Ford Causeway (the A865) connects North Uist to the Isle of Benbecula. The South Ford Causeway (still the A865) connects Benbecula to South Uist. Finally, the Eriskay Causeway connects South Uist to Eriskay.

Berneray is served by regular local bus services from Lochmaddy on North Uist, many of which form part of the "Spine Route" from Eriskay. Most services are operated by Grenitote Travel, with funding from Comhairle nan Eilean Siar. Berneray is also linked to Harris, Scotland via Leverburgh by the ferry MV Loch Portain, operated by Caledonian MacBrayne.

The CalMac ferry MV Loch Bhrusda is named after the largest loch on Berneray. It can occasionally be seen relieving for MV Loch Portain.

== Nature ==
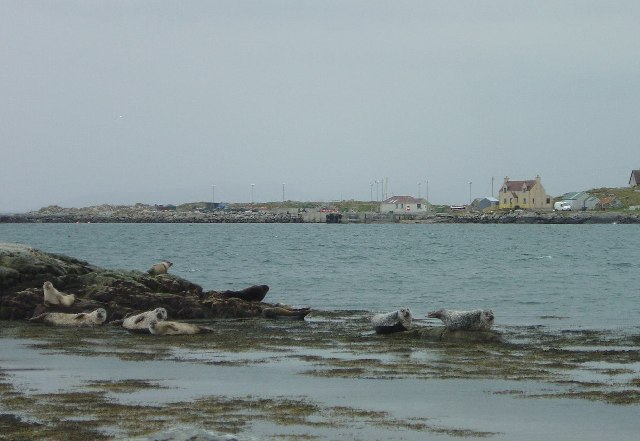
Grey seals, from the seal view point in Bay's Loch

The crofting practices also encourage a wide array of wildlife on Berneray. On early summer evenings you can sometimes hear snipe drumming, and even the rasp of a corncrake. Mute swans can be seen on Loch Brusda, and greylag geese are common. In the winter they are joined by barnacle, and a few brent geese. Ravens, grey herons and buzzards are often to be seen. Golden eagles and hen harriers are rarer sights, usually in the winter. Wading birds on the shore include redshank, sanderling, turnstone, oystercatcher, dunlin, curlew, whimbrel, ringed plover.

Further out, around the shores of Berneray, are mallards, eiders, red-breasted mergansers, and, more rarely, black-throated and great northern divers. Shags and cormorants fish in the seas around Berneray throughout the year, and in summer you can see gannets diving. Common seals often congregate at low tide on the rocks in Bays Loch, and can often be seen from the parking area a little way beyond the Post Office or by taking a boat trip out into the bay. Grey seals, which are larger and can be distinguished by the long "Roman" noses, also haul out there occasionally, but are more common off the West Beach. Though the otters of Berneray are out during the day more often than on the mainland, they are still elusive, and it takes patience and luck to see one.

== Media and the arts ==
A documentary entitled Shepherds of Berneray was aired on UK television in 1981.

Berneray was in world news in 1987 when it was found that Charles, Prince of Wales had visited the island to live a normal Berneray life as a crofter. He lived and worked with a crofter for one week and his visit spawned the later television documentary, A Prince Among Islands, in 1991.

In 2007 a DVD called The Old New Year – a living tradition on the Isle of Berneray - was released about the island's Oidhche Challainn ("New Year's Eve", literally "Night of the Calends) celebration of New Year on 12 January in line the former Highland tradition of following the Julian Calendar.

In 2009 it was reported that Berneray's west beach had been used to advertise Kae Bae beach in Trat Province, Thailand. A VisitScotland spokeswoman said that "I'm sure it is a compliment in disguise."

The traditional Gaelic song 'Fàgail Bheàrnaraigh' (Leaving Berneray) later became the American folk song "O, Waly, Waly' The Water is Wide" with new lyrics added in English.

The English singer Vashti Bunyan wrote much of her debut album Just Another Diamond Day while living in a croft on Berneray. She revisits her old home at the end of Kieran Evans' documentary film about Bunyan's early life, Vashti Bunyan: From Here To Before.

== Famous residents ==
- Berneray is the birthplace of the giant Angus MacAskill.
- Iain Eairdsidh MacAsgaill, a World War I veteran of the King's Own Cameron Highlanders, Western Australian bush poet in Scottish Gaelic, and highly important figure in 20th-century Scottish Gaelic literature, was born and raised on Berneray.
- Donald MacKillop (1926–2015), a songwriter, poet, and important figure in Scottish Gaelic literature, was also from Berneray.
- The Scottish singer, writer, and actor Fish (born 1958) owns a croft on Berneray and publicised plans to permanently relocate to the island in 2024–25 following his retirement from the music industry.

== See also ==
- List of islands of Scotland
- Burghead - an east coast village that also celebrates the Old New Year.
- Newtonferry - a village on North Uist
