= Bhacsaidh =

Bhacsaidh or Bhacsaigh (from Old Norse bakkis-ey meaning "peat bank island") is the Scottish Gaelic name of several islands in the Outer Hebrides with similar spelled names in English:

- Vacasay near Eilean Cearstaidh
- Vaccasay near Hermetray
- Vacsay in West Loch Roag
