= Berneray =

Berneray or Bernera (Scottish Gaelic: Beàrnaraigh) is the name of several Scottish islands:

== Bernera ==
There are three islands called Bernera:

- Bernera Island, a tidal island off the south-west coast of Lismore
- Great Bernera on the north-west coast of Lewis
- Little Bernera to the north of Great Bernera

== Berneray ==
There are two islands named Berneray in the Outer Hebrides of Scotland:

- Barra Head, the southernmost isle of the Outer Hebrides (also known as Berneray)
- Berneray (North Uist), near North Uist. Under the parish of Harris and owned as part of the Bays of Harris Estate.
