= Robin de La Lanne-Mirrlees =

British author (1925-2012)

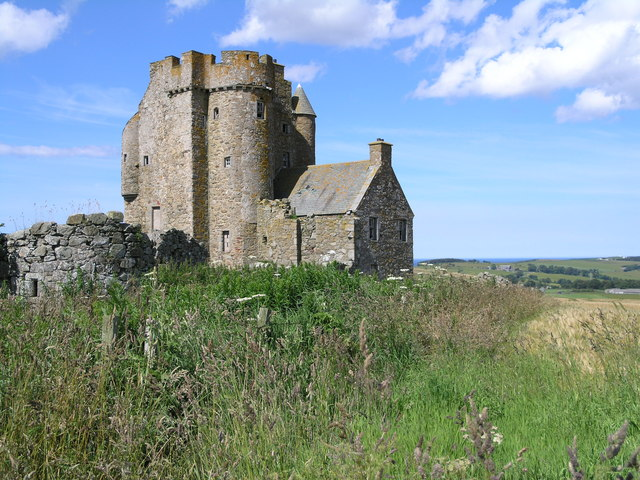
Inchdrewer Castle

Coat of arms of Robin Ian Evelyn Milne Stuart de la Lanne-Mirrlees (granted 1953)

Robin Ian Evelyn Milne Stuart de la Lanne-Mirrlees (13 January 1925 – 23 June 2012) was an author and former officer of arms at the College of Arms in London.

== Biography ==
He was born as Robin Ian Evelyn Grinnell-Milne in 1925. His father was Duncan Grinnell-Milne and his mother was Frances Warrington Peyrigné Lalanne (daughter of Frank Dale Lalanne, US Ambassador to Prague), who remarried secondly Maj.-Gen. William Henry Buchanan Mirrlees. His step-aunt was the author Hope Mirrlees. He was a godson of the 11th Duke of Argyll. He was educated at the English School of Cairo, and also in Paris. He attended Merton College, Oxford, matriculating in 1947 and taking a third class degree in PPE in 1949. He undertook military service, rising to the rank of captain in the Royal Artillery. His heraldic career began on 17 May 1952 when he was appointed Rouge Dragon Pursuivant of Arms in Ordinary. Later that year his name was changed to that listed above to the name Robin Ian Evelyn Milne Stuart de La Lanne-Mirrlees.

In 1958 he adopted by deed poll the name of Robin Ian Evelyn Milne Stuart le Compte de La Lanne-Mirrlees and in 1959 rectified the spelling to Robin Ian Evelyn Milne Stuart le Comte de La Lanne-Mirrlees. He would hold this post of Rouge Dragon Pursuivant until December 1962, when he was promoted to the office of Richmond Herald of Arms in Ordinary. He retired from this post in 1967. During his time at the College of Arms, Robin Milne Stuart de la Lanne-Mirrlees was perhaps best known for his correspondence with Ian Fleming. Fleming was doing research for his book On Her Majesty’s Secret Service.

In 1964 the Republic of San Marino granted him a comital title, which was recognised in 1968 by exiled King Umberto II of Italy.

In 1971 he bought and partly restored Inchdrewer Castle, a dilapidated 16th-century fortress, near Banff, Aberdeenshire, once owned by ancestors.

In 1975 Robin de la Lanne-Mirrlees was recognised by the Lord Lyon King of Arms as (feudal) Baron of Inchdrewer and Laird of Bernera. He was also a Knight of Honour and Devotion of the Sovereign Military Hospitaller Order of St. John of Jerusalem, of Rhodes and of Malta.

In 1990 he sold the uninhabited island of Eilean Chearstaidh he purchased, in 1962, with the islands of Great Bernera (where he lived near until his death) and Little Bernera, located in the Outer Hebrides of Scotland.

He owned other grand properties including a £400,000 chateau in France – his mother’s former home – a flat in Paris, Ratzenegg Castle in Austria, a seven-bedroom Holland Park mansion in London and a Swiss chalet. Moreover he owned a prized collection of antiques and paintings, which were diminished after he auctioned them off.

In 1992, by a further deed poll, he adopted the name Robin Ian Evelyn Milne Stuart le Prince de La Lanne-Mirrlees.

In 2005, he began to assert his claim to a princely title bestowed on him ad personam (on an individual basis) in 1967 by ex-King Peter II of Yugoslavia, to whom he was an honorary aide-de-camp, who would have created him Prince of Incoronata, according to an Adriatic island on the Dalmatian coast.

After several years of ill health, he died at a nursing home in Stornoway, Scotland on 23 June 2012. Robin was survived by his three adult grandchildren and his son Patrick de La Lanne-Mirrlees (son of Margareta Duchess of Wurttemberg, daughter of Princess Nadezhda of Bulgaria and granddaughter of King Ferdinand I of Bulgaria), former mayor of Delmenhorst, Germany, then practising as lawyer, specializing in international law, and now as Oberkirchenrat (senior church council member) of the Evangelical Lutheran Church in Bavaria.

== See also ==
- Heraldry
- Pursuivant
- Herald

Heraldic offices
Preceded by Michael Trappes-Lomax	Rouge Dragon Pursuivant; 1952 – 1962	Succeeded by Sir Conrad Swan
Preceded by Sir Anthony Wagner	Richmond Herald; 1962 – 1967	Succeeded by John Brooke-Little
