= Murdo Stewart MacDonald =

Captain Murdo Stewart MacDonald (1849 or 1852 – 1938) was a Scottish sailor. He is known to the whole of the nautical world as the last of the Sea-Barons.

== Early life ==
MacDonald was born in about 1852 in Tigh a Chaolais, Great Bernera, Isle of Lewis, Scotland. He was the 6th child of John MacDonald 'an Domhnullach' of Tigh a Chaolais. An Domhnullach was the son of Donald MacDonald, tacksman of Little Bernera and was a direct descendant of Dòmhnall Cam.

== Career ==
MacDonald went to sea at the age of eighteen as an apprentice in the Glasgow ship, Assaye. He served for four years in the Calcutta and New Zealand trades. From an early age he proved himself a competent seaman and ship driver. When he was 24 he was first mate on the May Queen the captain was injured during a storm. MacDonald remained on deck and drove the ship for 33 days and nights while the ship was battered by storms. The second mate was also washed overboard.

In 1882 when he was at home in Bernera he received a telegram asking him to report to Greenock to take captaincy of a vessel.

The vessel he was to take charge of was the Sir Lancelot one of the most famous clippers on the China run. The Sir Lancelot was a very fast vessel and frequently overtook other ships on the same routes by a matter of days.

Under MacDonald the ship was on the sugar and rice trade, taking sugar from Mauritius to the Indian coast or the Gulfs and salt to Calcutta or Rangoon. It took six cargoes a year, when speed meant money, and when almost every passage saw the breaking of a record.

The Sir Lancelot was sold to a merchant in Bombay in 1886 and in 1887 MacDonald settled in Mauritius. He was appointed Examiner for Masters' and Mates' Certificates in 1890, Surveyor to the Vice-Admiralty Court in 1892, and Surveyor to Lloyd's Register in 1895. He held the latter position until his son took over in 1923.

== Personal life ==
MacDonald was married to Elizabeth O'Keefe and they had two sons.

== Death ==
MacDonald died on 4 March 1938 in Mauritius.
