= Wonderbook =

- Developer: London Studio
- Publisher: SCEE
- Platform: PlayStation 3
- Release: NA: 13 November 2012; AU: 15 November 2012; EU: 16 November 2012; JP: 7 November 2013
- Genre: Gaming

Wonderbook is an augmented reality peripheral for the PlayStation 3 console. The user holds a physical book-like object and the software displays content on the television's screen.

== Development ==
Wonderbook was announced during the Sony press conference at the 2012 Electronic Entertainment Expo. It is an augmented reality book which is designed to be used in conjunction with the PlayStation Move and PlayStation Eye. The Wonderbook features computer vision techniques developed jointly with the Computer Vision group at Oxford Brookes University (an offset of the Torr Vision Group). Marketed under the tagline "One book, a thousand stories", it was released together with the launch title Book of Spells in time for the 2012 holiday season.

== Reception ==
The Wonderbook has received mixed reception over the years since its original release. Shortly after the Wonderbook's release in 2012, Wired talked highly of its cheap price point ($34.99/£22.99) alongside its unique approach to augmented reality. The Sixth Axis, another video game review/news website, looked back on the Wonderbook 4 years later to examine the hardware. Though the Wonderbook itself is awkwardly large, Jim Hargreaves agreed that the tech was impressive for its time despite its quick obsolescence.

== List of compatible games ==
- Book of Spells
- Diggs Nightcrawler
- Walking with Dinosaurs
- Book of Potions
