= Dun Bharabhat, Great Bernera =

Dun Bharabhat
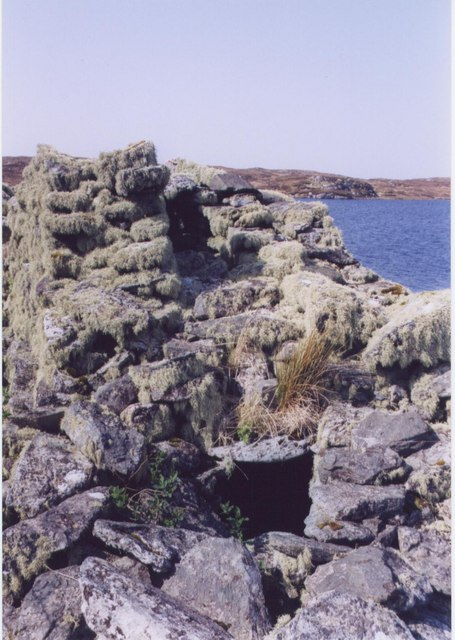
- Hollow wall of Dun Bharabhat

- Shown next to Lewis
- 58°13′00″N 6°50′42″W
- Type: Broch
- Periods: Iron Age
- Location: Great Bernera

Dun Bharabhat (or Dun Baravat) is an Iron Age galleried dun or "semi-broch" situated on the island of Great Bernera near Lewis in Scotland (grid reference NB15583555).

== Location ==
Dun Bharabhat (pronounced 'Varavat') is situated on an islet in Loch Bharabhat on the island of Great Bernera which lies close to the west coast of Lewis. It is to be distinguished from another Dun Bharabhat situated on a small loch near the northernmost point of Lewis.

The broch stands high above the water, and is connected to the shore by a 30-metre causeway.

== Description ==
The building is a D-shaped broch with a wall of uneven thickness. The broch measures 17 metres by 13 metres externally. The walls stand to a maximum height of 3.4 metres. The building is badly ruined, and strewn with rubble. The entrance is on the northwest but cannot be seen. Nevertheless, it is considered one of the best preserved of all the island duns.

A ground level gallery can be seen at the east end of the high wall where an opening shows a small part of it. A stairway is also present in this part of the building. The upper part of the wall contains the remains of two superimposed galleries. The opening of a longitudinal gallery or cell running northeast from the entrance can still be seen at the west end of the high wall. The intramural galleries are evident from the shore.
