= Callum Macdonald =

Scottish printer and publisher

Callum Macdonald MBE (1912–1999), was a Scottish printer and publisher born in Breaclete on the island of Great Bernera. He was educated in Stornoway and read History at the University of Edinburgh. After service in the Royal Air Force in World War II, he set up in business as a publisher in Edinburgh (relocating latterly to Loanhead) and founded the literary journal Lines Review in 1952. He died in Peebles.

As a principled publisher, Callum Macdonald used proceeds from his general printing business to specialise in the publication of poetry and was instrumental in advancing the work of many major Scottish poets such as Hugh MacDiarmid, Sydney Goodsir Smith and Norman MacCaig. He was awarded an MBE for services to Scottish literary publishing in 1992.

In 2001, his widow, the poet Tessa Ransford, founded the Callum Macdonald Memorial Award, an annual prize given to small publishers who specialise in poetry.
