= Diggs Nightcrawler =

2013 video game

- European cover art
- Developers: London Studio; Moonbot Studios; Exient
- Publisher: Sony Computer Entertainment
- Platform: PlayStation 3
- Release: EU: 31 May 2013; NA: 12 November 2013
- Genre: Adventure
- Mode: Single-player

Diggs Nightcrawler (or Wonderbook: Diggs Nightcrawler) is a 2013 augmented reality adventure video game developed by London Studio, Moonbot Studios and Exient and published by Sony Computer Entertainment for the PlayStation 3. It is the second game to make use of the Wonderbook peripheral. The game was released alongside Walking with Dinosaurs and Book of Potions.

== Story ==
=== Chapter One ===
The game begins with a short film in which Humpty Dumpty, addressing the player, says he knows he will soon be "bumped off", and asks the player to find his close friend, private detective Diggs Nightcrawler, in order to find out who is responsible. The film ends just as Humpty's apparent murderer enters the room (though they are not shown). The player then meets with Diggs at his office. Diggs agrees to bring the "kid" along, but only because it was Humpty's request. A mysterious suited individual appears at the door and hands Diggs an egg bomb, prompting a chase through the city streets, during which the shadowy figure gets away. Diggs and the player head to the crime scene where, despite the suspicions of the three little porcine police officers, they find the pieces of Humpty's shell, which are then used to put Humpty together again. But, just before they place the last piece, Diggs and the pigs are beaten up under cover of darkness, only to find, when light returns, that Humpty's body has been taken.

Diggs decides to head to the Frying Pan, a jazz club owned by Humpty, to see his girlfriend Itsy Bitsy in hopes of getting a new lead. He is physically barred from entry by Seeno, Hearno, and Speakno, but finds a way around them. Itsy lets Diggs hide in her dressing room while she performs a number, where he finds another piece of Humpty's shell. Thinking the "shadow" may be trying to frame Itsy, too, Diggs heads to the show floor to warn her. Shortly afterward, the three little pigs enter, convinced that Diggs is the murderer, prompting a chase to the club's rear exit. After subduing the cops, Diggs finds the shadow making a getaway in his car, with Humpty's body in the back. The detective enlists the help of the three blind mice to catch the shadow.

=== Chapter Two ===
After a car chase in which a few pieces of Humpty loose, but not in catching the shadow, Diggs heads to other parts of Library City to collect the missing shell fragments including the Pirates' Wharf, where he finds that L.J. Silver and his crew are assisting the villain by stealing pages from other stories; Bo Peep's meadow, where he learns that missing pages in their stories has caused some characters to act strangely, and Ma Goose, who Diggs helps by repairing a few stories. Finally, he heads to Sherwood, where Robin Hood has been affected by his story missing pages. Unfortunately, Diggs is captured by Seeno, Hearno and Speakno. He briefly breaks free, but is recaptured and sent to Horrortown and the player learns that the "shadow" is really The Invisible Man.

=== Chapter Three ===
After finding the entrance to an abandoned castle through a graveyard, the player is reunited with Diggs, being held in the dungeon. "Invisible Manny" appears to taunt Diggs before he and the three monkeys are called by the "boss". Shortly afterward, Bitsy appears and convinces Diggs to give her the pieces of Humpty's shell he has collected, after which she reveals that she is the boss, and leaves Diggs to his death. However, Diggs is rescued by the player and heads to a room where Itsy's plan is revealed: by stealing the best parts of other stories and adding them to her own, The Itsy Bitsy Spider will become the "best story in town". Assisted by Frankie, she succeeds in bringing her Franken-story to life but, thanks to Diggs putting him back together just in time, Humpty is also resurrected. The three heroes chase Itsy through the castle in an extended gunfight at the end of which the three little pigs reappear to arrest Diggs, but Humpty sets them straight.

Finally, the group head to the towering waterspout. After Dumpty and the pigs are left unable to continue, Diggs and the player make their way to the top of the tower where, after a brief scuffle over the book, whose myriad mismatched contents are quickly spiralling out of control, Itsy falls into the waterspout and is flushed down to her apparent demise.

Diggs and Humpty reconvene at the don's manor where, after recounting the adventure, Diggs formally acknowledges the player as his partner.

== Gameplay ==
Unlike Book of Spells, the Wonderbook is used in more ways than just turning its pages; players will frequently have to rotate, tilt and shake the book in order to interact with the world displayed on screen and advance the plot. Upon completion of each of the game's three chapters, the player can partake in a number of photographic assignments using the PlayStation Move controller as a camera.

== Reception ==
In an article for The Telegraph, Andy Robertson gave the game a positive review, praising its improvements over Book of Spells in both plot substance and more active use of the Wonderbook peripheral. He also stated that the Wonderbook games, along with titles such as Invizimals, The Unfinished Swan and Tumble, are helping Sony "[hit] the family market previously dominated by Nintendo."
