= Bernera Riot =

1874 Riot of Great Bernera

Coordinates: 58.24278°N 6.87375°W

The Bernera Riot occurred in 1874, on the island of Great Bernera, in Scotland in response to the Highland Clearances. The use of the term 'Bernera Riot' correctly relates to the court case which exposed the maltreatment of the peasant classes in the Highlands and Islands of Scotland and exposed the corruption that was inherent in the landowning class. The 'riot' was not fought in the streets or in the fields but in the Scots Lawcourts. It is notable as the first successful legal challenge to nineteenth century Landlordism in the Highlands and Islands of Scotland and was the catalyst for future resistance in what became known as the Crofters War. Modern land reform in Scotland has its roots in the outcome of this event.

== Location ==
Great Bernera (Beàrnaraigh Mòr) is an island in Loch Roag, off the Isle of Lewis in the Outer Hebrides. It is fairly close to Lewis, but it was not until 1953 that a bridge was built, after the islanders threatened to dynamite the hillside to create a causeway. Bernera was a crofting community at the time of the riot but today that form of land-holding is rapidly diminishing.

== Beginnings ==
The whole of the Highlands of Scotland suffered from the Highland Clearances over a period of a hundred years or more. Although much lamented in Gaelic song, and literature, in very few places did they meet a stiff resistance - Bernera was one of the first places to challenge the authorities, and Skye was another, where the Battle of the Braes took place.

Sir James Matheson having bought the Isle of Lewis, also took charge of adjoining Bernera, and appointed a solicitor, Donald Munro to be his factor. Munro was perceived as being heavy-handed, and his evictions were naturally unpopular. As there was no security of tenure for the peasants and the vast majority were illiterate Munro had authority to issue very harsh and sweeping edicts.

The Bernera islanders had their summer grazings on mainland Lewis taken away from them in 1850 in favour of a new sporting estate known as the Uig deer forest. Furthermore, they were forced to construct dykes at their own expense as a new boundary between their stock and the sporting estate. In time this area was considered not large enough for the sporting estate and in 1872 Munro issued a notice that even this new smaller grazings area would be taken from the Bernera people and their ancient grazings rights would disappear altogether. The islanders naturally had enough and made a stance against this tyranny.

== The Riot ==
When the Bernera people refused to bow to Munro's tyranny his response was to send the Sheriff Officer and the Ground Officer over to Bernera with eviction orders for 58 families. These eviction notices were initially greeted with quiet disbelief in Breaclete.

When the bailiffs arrived at Tobson however, they were pelted with a shower of clods of earth. The sheriff officer also had his coat torn and he issued a threat that if he had a gun many Bernera mothers would be mourning the loss of their sons.

== The Response ==
After three crofters were singled out and arrested hundreds of Bernera men marched on Lews Castle, Stornoway with pipers at their head. They demanded an audience with Sir James Matheson himself. Matheson who was somewhat aged at the time disowned Donald Munro, who came to be dismissed in 1875. The prisoners themselves were acquitted following the brilliant performance of the Inverness lawyer Charles Innes. Mr Innes's name is still revered in Bernera today. His most famous quotation from the trial was "Oppressed as they are I, as a stranger, cannot but admire them. Had Mr Munro, instead of being Chamberlain of The Lews, been an Agent in either Connaught or Munster, he would long ago have licked the dust he has for years made the poor men of this island swallow".

The Bernera court case of 1874 is the first documented victory for Highland crofters and correctly holds its place as the opening shot of the crofters fight-back which led to the Napier Commission and land reform.

== Influence ==
The riot was mentioned in a number of Scottish radical journals in the following years.

The "Battle of the Braes" (Scottish Gaelic: Blàr a' Chumhaing) took place on Skye less than a decade later, in 1882, when crofters began a rent strike and confronted the Portree Sheriff's Officer sent to enforce eviction notices against them, forcing him to burn the documentation. This resulted in the deployment of around 50 police officers from Glasgow to the area, who were met by an angry mob of men, women and children armed with improvised weapons.

The Crofters' War took place about ten years later, and led to the founding of the Napier Commission, which led to compromises being made on behalf of the crofters, and the reform of crofting in Scotland, beginning with the passing of the Crofters' Holdings (Scotland) Act 1886.

The Gaelic poet, Iain Mac a' Ghobhainn (John Smith) lived in Lewis near Bernera at the time of the Riot, and wrote his poem Spiorad a' Charthannais (Spirit of Charity) in condemnation of feudal tyranny.
