= Lines Review =

Lines Review was a Scottish poetry journal founded by the publisher Callum Macdonald in 1952. Its original editorial board included the Scottish poets Sydney Goodsir Smith, Hugh MacDiarmid, Norman MacCaig, Sorley MacLean and Denis Peploe. Latterly its individual editors included the poets Robin Fulton and Tessa Ransford. Tessa Ransford, the founder of the Scottish Poetry Library, published the final issue in 1998.

The magazine featured the poetry of many important Scottish poets such as Iain Crichton Smith, George Mackay Brown or Angus Calder and was a starting point for many young Scottish poets.

The editor of Lines Review from 1977 to 1984 was the poet, William Montgomerie (1904 Glasgow - 1994 Edinburgh).

== See also ==
- List of magazines published in Scotland
