= Duncan Grinnell-Milne =

English First World War pilot and POW

Duncan William Grinnell-Milne
- Born: 6 August 1896; Bromley, London, England
- Died: November 1973 (aged 77); Westminster, London, England
- Military career
- Allegiance: United Kingdom
- Branch: British Army; Royal Air Force
- Service years: 1914–1926; 1939–1940
- Rank: Captain
- Units: Rifle Brigade; Royal Fusiliers; No. 16 Squadron RFC; No. 56 Squadron RFC; No. 214 Squadron RAF; No. 14 Squadron RAF; No. 19 Squadron RAF
- Commands: No. 56 Squadron RAF
- Conflicts: First World War; Second World War
- Awards: Military Cross; Distinguished Flying Cross & Bar
- Other work: Broadcaster & author

Captain Duncan William Grinnell-Milne MC, DFC* (6 August 1896 – November 1973) was an English First World War pilot credited with six confirmed aerial victories, a prisoner of war who escaped from German captivity, a flying ace, and an author. Initially serving with the 7th Battalion, Royal Fusiliers, he was seconded to the Royal Flying Corps before joining the Royal Air Force.

== Early life and background ==
He was the second son of George Grinnell-Milne (1853–1931), a merchant banker, and Maria Caroline Mess (1862–1942) who were married in The Hague in 1882. He was educated at Cheam School and the University of Freiburg.

== World War I ==
Grinnell-Milne was commissioned as a second lieutenant (on probation) in the 5th Battalion, Rifle Brigade (Prince Consort's Own) on 13 December 1913 at the age of 17. On the outbreak of World War I he was considered too young for front-line service, so in an effort to evade this restriction, on 12 December 1914 he transferred to the 7th Battalion, Royal Fusiliers (City of London Regiment). However, he was soon seconded to the Royal Flying Corps for flying training, and on 17 August 1915 was granted Royal Aero Club Aviators' Certificate No. 1609 following a flight in a Maurice Farman biplane at the Military Flying School at Shoreham. He was confirmed in his rank of second lieutenant on 7 September, and two days later was appointed a flying officer.

Grinnell-Milne was promoted to lieutenant on 29 September 1915, and posted to No. 16 Squadron RFC, where on 28 November, flying a BE.2c, he shot down an Albatros C.I over Sequedin. Only days later, on 1 December, he was forced down behind the German lines and captured. He was listed as "missing" on 2 December, eventually being reported a prisoner of war in early January 1916.

Grinnell-Milne spent over two years as a prisoner of war before he finally escaped in April 1918, making his way from Germany to The Netherlands and was briefly interned before returning to England, where on 16 May he was presented to King George V at Buckingham Palace.

Grinnell-Milne eventually returned to aerial combat with No. 56 Squadron RAF, flying the S.E.5a. On 5 October he destroyed a balloon south-west of Busigny. On 21 October he was appointed a flight commander with the rank of acting-captain, and celebrated by destroying a Fokker D.VII north of Bousies the same day. He destroyed and drove down two more D.VII's over the Mormal Woods on 29 October, and destroyed his fifth and final aircraft, another D.VII, on 3 November north-east of Valenciennes. A week later the armistice brought the fighting to an end.

On 17 December Grinnell-Milne took command of No. 56 Squadron, remaining with it until it was reduced to cadre status, flying his red-painted S.E.5a, named Schweinhund, for the last time on 23 January 1919. In February 1919 his award of the Distinguished Flying Cross was gazetted.

== Between the wars ==
In 1919 and 1920, Grinnell-Milne served with No. 214 Squadron and No. 14 Squadron in Egypt. He was appointed an acting-captain on 1 May 1919, and on 30 May his award of a bar to his Distinguished Flying Cross was gazetted. On 1 August he was granted a permanent commission in the Royal Air Force with the rank of lieutenant. On 16 December 1920 he was awarded the Military Cross "in recognition of gallantry in escaping from captivity while [a] prisoner of war", and on 1 January 1921 he was promoted to flight lieutenant.

Grinnell-Milne then served as a test pilot at Royal Aircraft Establishment at Farnborough, and in June 1922 took part in the third "RAF Aerial Pageant" at Hendon, where he and Flight Lieutenant P. W. S. Bulman flew two S.E. 5a's in a demonstration of combat tactics against a Airco DH.10 Amiens twin-engined bomber flown by Squadron Leader Roderic M. Hill. On 14 April 1923 he was appointed an attaché in the Air Section of the British Delegation in Paris. On 20 February 1925 he was posted to No. 19 Squadron at RAF Duxford, but on 14 April was placed on half-pay, and on 14 October placed on the retired list at his own request. During his career Grinnell-Milne had flown 60 different aircraft types and had amassed over 2,000 flying hours.

After leaving the RAF he worked as an art dealer in New York, and also as an author, publishing two autobiographical works; An Escaper's Log (1926), detailing his time as a prisoner in Germany, and Wind in the Wires (1933) about his flying career, as well as several novels. Later he worked as a broadcaster for the BBC.

== World War II ==
He returned to military service prior to World War II, being commissioned as a pilot officer in the Royal Air Force Volunteer Reserve on 25 April 1939. On 17 June 1940, following Marshal Philippe Pétain's declaration of his intention to seek an armistice, Air-Vice Marshal Arthur Barratt, Air Officer Commanding-in-Chief British Air Forces in France, sent Grinnell-Milne on a mission to deliver letters to the leaders of the French Air Force, stating Britain's determination to continue the fight, and encouraging them to do the same in North Africa. Grinnell-Milne was also appointed the British liaison officer to the Commander-in-Chief of the French Air Force Joseph Vuillemin, and equipped with portable radio transmitter, call-signs and codes. Grinnell-Milne drove to Bordeaux, then to GHQ French Air Forces at Agen. There Vuillemin regretfully informed him that he had begun the process of transferring men and aircraft to North Africa, but had now received orders to halt all movements. Grinnell-Milne found most of the senior staff officers were either resigned to their fate, obstructive, or openly hostile, though he noted that many of the younger officers and men were eager to leave for England. He left France late on 18 June aboard Arethusa. Once back in London he was appointed liaison officer to Free French General Charles de Gaulle, remaining with him for the next four months, and taking part in the battles of Dakar and Gabon. He was promoted to flying officer on 3 August 1941. Grinnell-Milne was invalided out of the RAF (technically he resigned his commission), retaining his rank of flying officer on 20 July 1944. Thereafter he rejoined the BBC, remaining there until 1946.

== Postwar career ==
Grinnell-Milne settled in London and became a professional writer, mainly of history and biography.

== Awards and citations ==
Distinguished Flying Cross

Lieut. (A./Capt.) Duncan Grinnell-Milne. (FRANCE)

This officer has shown exceptional gallantry and disregard of danger on numerous occasions, notably on 5th October, when he obtained a direct hit on a train with a bomb; he then attacked and destroyed in flames a balloon on the ground. On his return journey he attacked troops and transport with marked success, dropping his last bomb in the middle of a crowd of enemy troops.

== Personal life ==
Grinnell-Milne was married three times. In May 1921 he became engaged to Frances Warrington La Lanne, daughter of Mr. and Mrs. Frank Dale La Lanne of Philadelphia and they were married on 17 September 1921. Their son Robin Ian Evelyn Grinnell-Milne was born on 13 January 1925. They divorced in 1927. He married Blanca de Undurraga y Sandiford, daughter of Don Julio de Undurraga, which also ended in divorce, and he finally married Pauline Alice Margaret Lemieux, daughter of Dr. Louis-Joseph Lemieux (Canadian Member of Legislative Assembly for Gaspé), on 26 May 1932.

== Publications ==
Autobiography

- An Escaper's Log. London: John Lane. 1926.
- Wind in the Wires. London: Hurst & Blackett. 1933.

Non-fiction

- Baden-Powell at Mafeking. London: Bodley Head. 1957.
- The Silent Victory, September 1940. London: Bodley Head. 1958.
- The Triumph of Integrity; A portrait of Charles de Gaulle. London: Bodley Head. 1961.
- Mad, is he? The character and achievement of James Wolfe. London: Bodley Head. 1963.
- The Killing of William Rufus: an investigation in the New Forest. Newton Abbot: David & Charles. 1968.

Fiction

- Fortune of War. London: John Lane. 1931.
- Ashby's Downfall. London: Herbert Jenkins. 1932.
- Brierley, a novel. London: Chapman & Hall. 1935.
