= Bostadh (Iron Age settlement) =

Bòstadh Iron Age settlement
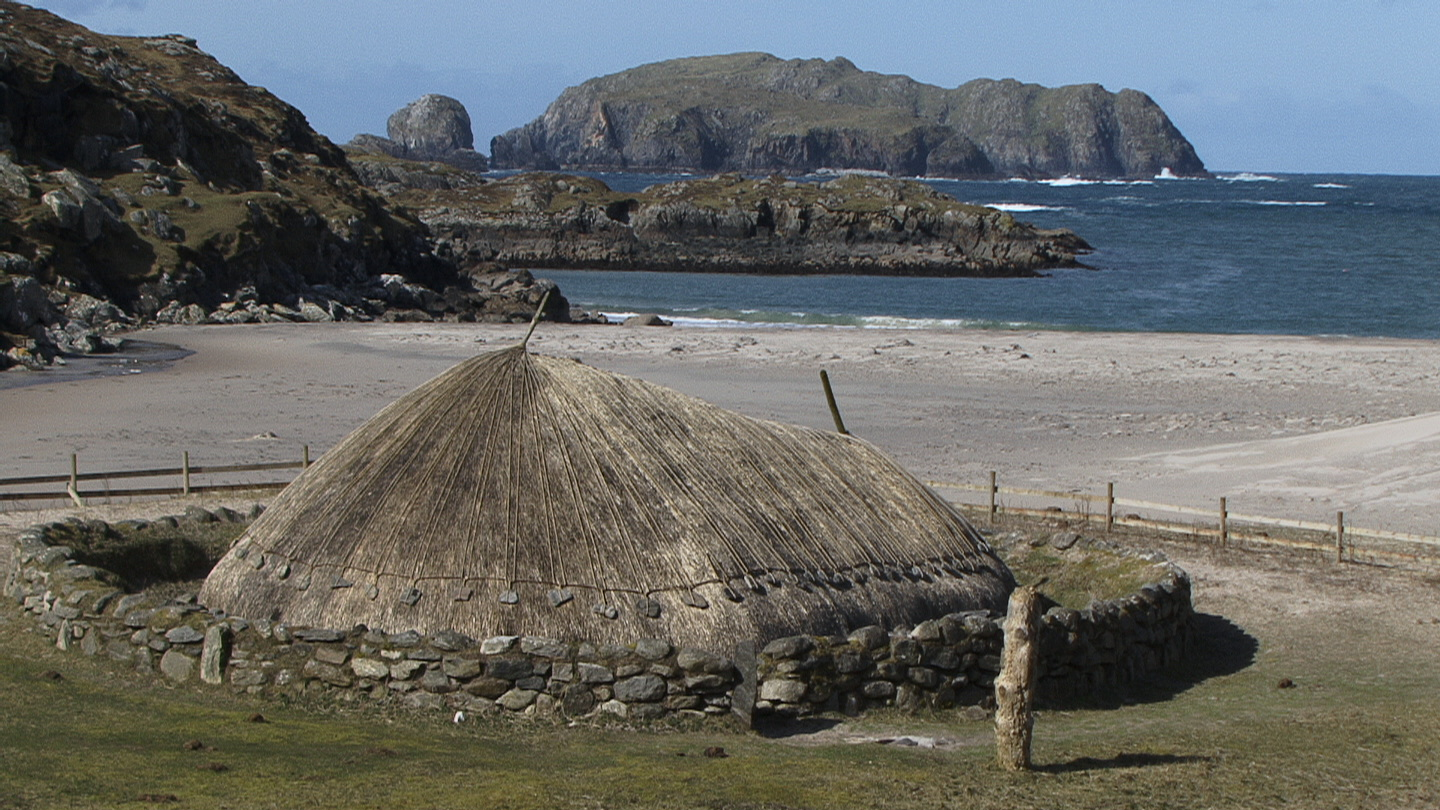
- A reconstruction of an Iron Age roundhouse based on the houses excavated on Bosta Beach

- Shown next to Lewis
- 58.2572°N 6.8814°W
- Location: Great Bernera, Outer Hebrides, Scotland

Site notes
- Architectural styles: Roundhouse, Norse structure
- Governing body: Historic Environment Scotland
- Owner: Comunn Eachdraidh Sgìre Bheàrnaraigh (Bernera Historical Society)

The Bòstadh settlement (also known as Tràigh Bhòstadh or Bosta Beach) is a settlement of houses located on Bosta Beach. The Bostadh Iron Age settlement is located on the island of Great Bernera in the Outer Hebrides, Scotland. The settlement originally dates to the Late Iron Age, using the Long Iron Age Scheme, to about 400-800 CE. A later Norse structure was built on top of the Iron Age settlement. The settlement was located in an advantageous area; it had easy access to a freshwater stream to the south, and its proximity to the ocean provided easy access to fishing waters.

The Bòstadh Iron Age settlement is a scheduled monument. It is monitored by Historic Environment Scotland and is managed by the Comunn Eachdraidh Sgìre Bheàrnaraigh (Bernera Historical Society).

== Archaeology ==
Prior to excavation there was a variety of evidence indicating the presence of a settlement on Bosta Beach, including artefacts and signs of the presence of structures.

As early as 1966 the presence of midden deposits and stone structures have been recorded. Records state that the middens and the structures were being eroded at the base of the dunes.

In 1968, the settlement was further exposed by erosion. The artefacts found include what is likely Iron Age pottery sherds, stone implements and pieces of corroded iron. At least two similar floors were found nearby, and they appeared to be more or less undisturbed. Inside of a structure demarcated by large stones, a flint flake, a small, thick pottery sherd, an antler tine of a red deer with evidence of use as tool, and a fragment of whale bone tool were found. These objects are currently held in Glasgow Art Gallery and Museum.

In 1969 an arc of set stones and a series of shorter sections of walls was found. These walls were likely the remains of houses. The midden material was also exposed a few yards to the west of the structures. The midden was found to contained shells, bones, fragments of broch-type pottery, and a piece of decorated bone that was perforated for use as a comb.

In 1983 a rusty metal object of twisted metal that was bent into ring of 114 millimetres was found in an eroding sand dune.

In January 1992 storm force winds and high tides caused significant erosion. The storm resulted in the erosion of at least one metre of dune face and lowered the level of the beach approximately one metre. A series of stone buildings were revealed underneath an eroding sand dune over a stretch of 30 metres. The total height of eroding dune ranged from 2 to 5 metres. The buildings had been buried beneath a sand dune. The buildings are bordered by exposed rock to the north, a stream estuary to the south, and Bosta Cemetery in the east. Most of the walls were over a metre thick. The walls consist of drystone facings on both the inner and outer surfaces and are filled with a sand core. The walls were constructed on dark brown sand deposits.

Finds include a significant number of pottery sherds including 160 rims and 50 bases, Beaker pottery, fish and animal bones (some of which displaying signs of butchering), antler, shells, worked bone tools, fragments of up to three combs, and a lead weight.

In 1994 more artefacts were revealed as a result of further erosion. These artefacts included a broken red hammerstone, a broken quartz hammerstone, a pot boiler, two quartz cores, and a pottery rim decorated with a stab pattern.

In 1996 a rescue excavation was carried out on the settlement. The excavation revealed five structures from 1st millennium as well as the associated middens. Another later Norse building was also revealed. Excavations were carried out by CFA Archaeology with the University of Edinburgh with the assistance of students and local community volunteers. The excavation revealed the layout of the village, which was recorded in detail.

Houses 1-3 date from 1st millennium CE and share a number of architectural features. They are all stone roundhouses with south-facing entrances and at least one annex. The walls have drystone inner and outer faces and are filled with cores of sand and midden. The central hearths in Houses 1-3 are constructed using stones and take the form of a three-sided, open ended rectangle. Evidence of inhabitation after the buildings had been abandoned was found. There is a consistent stratigraphic sequence that is observed between the Houses 1–3, showing that at least these three of the five structures were in use in the same period. House 3 was constructed in a substantial midden spread. This layer was not excavated due to time constraints. A protection strategy was developed over the course of the excavation in order to preserve the site.

Artefacts uncovered during the excavation include pieces of pottery and animal bone, carved bone implements, the remains of composite bone combs, hammerstones, querns, and some metalwork. An example of decorated pottery that has been tentatively dated to some time from the third to fifth centuries CE was found in House 5. The preservation of palaeoenvironmental evidence in the settlement is excellent.

Three sides of a later, likely Norse building was found overlaying the sand infill within House 1. This building survived to a maximum height of two courses high. The midden spread associated with this building spread downhill from the structure and overlays the sand infill of House 3. The presence of a steatite bowl fragment with rivet holes in the midden suggests that the rectangular structure dates to the Norse period.

== Preservation ==
An initiative is underway to preserved Houses 1 and 2. The eroding face of the sand dune face covering Houses 1 and 2 has been reinforced and protected by construction of an artificially sculpted sand dune face, which was reinforced and protected by the placement of a pre-seeded matting. This was funded by the Western Isles Council. House 3 was completely dismantled, and its footprint was demarcated with stones and the void that it previously occupied was backfilled. Houses 4 and 5 have been backfilled to protect and preserve them.

== Reconstruction ==
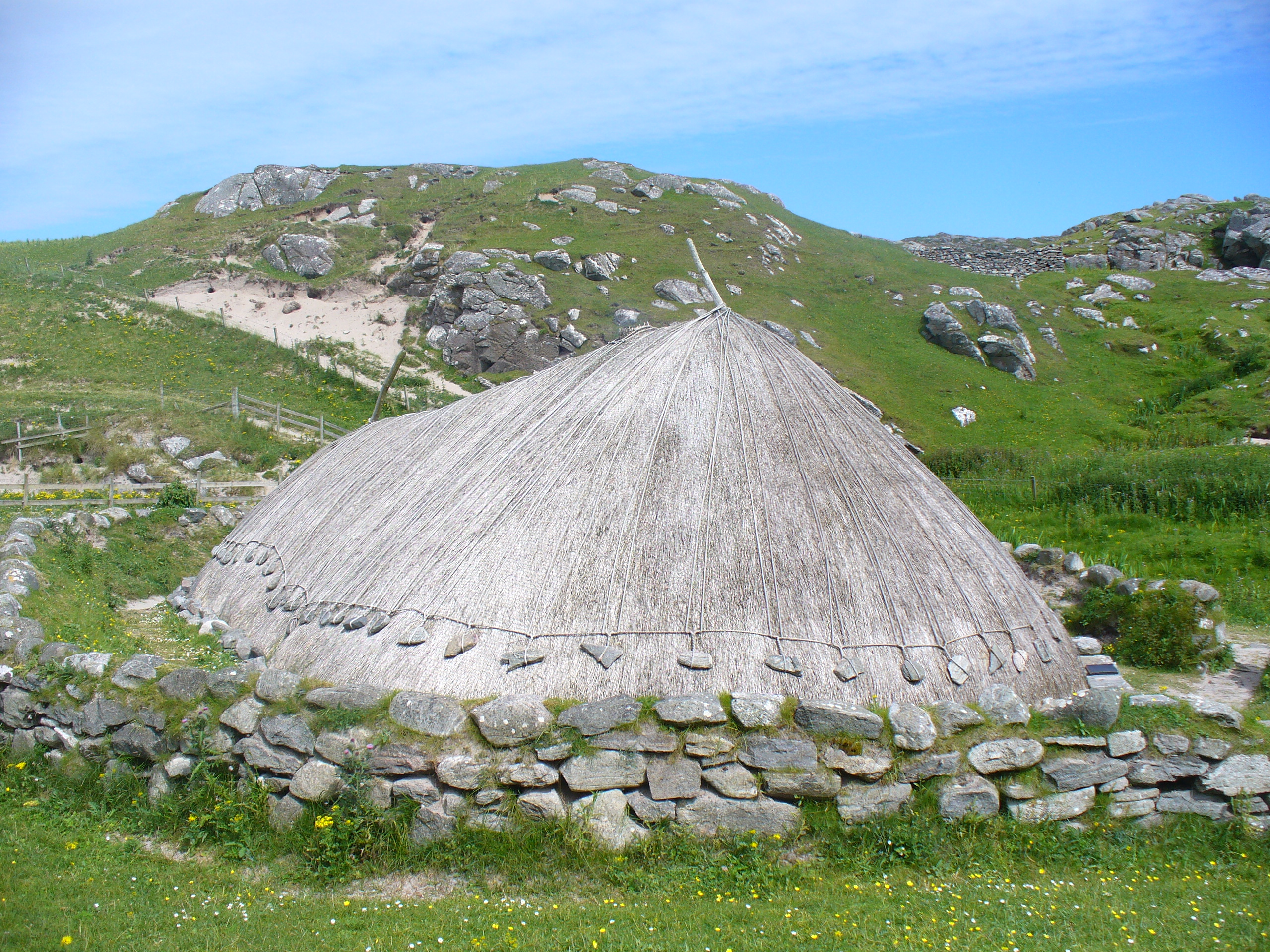
The reconstructed roundhouse with a thatched roof based on the houses found on Bosta Beach

In 1998 archeological evaluations was undertaken to identify a location near the Bosta Beach settlement that was of a suitable size and free from archaeological remains to construct a replica of one of the excavated Iron Age houses. The geophysical survey utilized resistivity, electromagnetic, and ground penetrating radar was undertaken to investigate the subsurface in two areas. No archaeological features were recorded by geophysical survey or trial excavations.

In 1999 a life size roundhouse based on the houses found on Bosta Beach was constructed. The techniques that were used to build the reconstruction were based on those that would have been used historically.

At one point the reconstructed house's roof was thatched and secured with a series of ropes and stone weights. However, the building was re-roofed with turf. The system of ropes and stone weights is no longer used, but the wooden "horns" at either end of the houses ridge are still present.

In the summer months visitors can tour the house, learn about the settlement, and see experimental archaeology that is being undertaken at the house.
