= Book of Potions =

2013 video game

- European cover art
- Developer: London Studio
- Publisher: Sony Computer Entertainment
- Series: Wizarding World
- Platform: PlayStation 3
- Release: NA: 12 November 2013; EU: 15 November 2013
- Genre: Augmented reality
- Mode: Single-player

Book of Potions (or Wonderbook: Book of Potions) is a 2013 augmented reality game developed by London Studio and published by Sony Computer Entertainment for the PlayStation 3. It is a companion to the Harry Potter series and serves as a follow-up to the Wonderbook's debut title, Book of Spells (2012). It was released in North America on 12 November 2013 and Europe on 15 November 2013, alongside Diggs Nightcrawler and Walking with Dinosaurs.

== Story ==
The Book of Potions was written sometime in the 16th century by Zygmunt Budge, an exceptionally talented potioneer who, after leaving Hogwarts at the age of 14, moved to the Outer Hebridean island of Hermetray where he lived alone, continuing his potioneering studies.

Approximately 500 years after his death, a Hogwarts student somehow comes into possession of the Book of Potions, finding that some of Zygmunt's personality lives on within its pages. Under his tutelage, the student begins their ascent to potioneering mastery. After successfully brewing an introductory boil-curing potion for Zygmunt's house elf, the student finds that they have somehow been entered into the Wizarding Schools Potions Championship, a septennial contest between students from magic schools across the globe.

With Zygmunt's help, the student brews various potions to overcome the obstacles standing between them and the Golden Cauldron, which, after brewing and imbibing Zygmunt's self-proclaimed finest work, Felix Felicis, they successfully obtain. Having done so, the student earns the right to use the cauldron to brew a new potion all their own. After finding some exceptionally rare ingredients, the student brews a potion which is revealed to be the "Potion of All Potential", which enables its drinker to reach their highest capability.

Zygmunt initially comes off as warped and slightly mad, thinking of little but the Golden Cauldron, but, as the student's potioneering skills improve, he finds himself warming to them, eventually revealing exactly why he left Hogwarts: as a student, Zygmunt asked the headmaster if he could enter the Wizarding Schools Potions Championship despite being three years below the minimum age for entry, but he was denied, being told that it was too dangerous. Unable to accept this, Zygmunt immediately left the school in protest, which disabled him from entering the Championship even once he had come of age.

Once the student wins the golden cauldron, Zygmunt's spirit finds itself at peace, and he congratulates them wholeheartedly for both obtaining it and brewing the Potion of All Potential. Saying that he'll no longer cause trouble for anyone else, he leaves the student to meet their "adoring public".

== Gameplay ==
Book of Potions is almost identical to Book of Spells in terms of gameplay; The PlayStation Eye renders the book and its effects while the PlayStation Move controller acts as a wand, as well as other instruments, such as a knife for chopping ingredients and a spoon for stirring the contents of a cauldron.

Like its predecessor, the game begins with the player choosing one of the four Hogwarts houses and one of three wands. Alternatively, if the player has a Pottermore account, they can log into it through the game and the choices will be made automatically to reflect those made on the Pottermore website.

The game consists of seven chapters, each focussing on a particular potion. Each chapter follows roughly the same structure: an introduction to the potion and its effect(s), gathering ingredients, brewing the potion, a short story related to the potion (which features some multiple-choice fill-in-the-blank interactivity), and, finally, using the potion to advance in the Wizarding Schools Potion Championship.

Finding certain hidden creatures during the gathering of ingredients will unlock those ingredients in the Concoctions mode, where the player can freely experiment and create custom potions by combining up to four of any of their gathered ingredients.

== Reception ==
In a joint review with Walking with Dinosaurs, Telegraph writer Andy Robertson (who also reviewed Diggs Nightcrawler) gave the game a positive review, noting the increased interaction with the Wonderbook itself compared to Book of Spells, as well as clearer signposting helping to make progression easier and more instinctive.
