= Martin Martin =

Scottish writer

Martin Martin (Scottish Gaelic: Màrtainn MacGilleMhàrtainn) (c. 1660–9 October 1718) was a Scottish writer best known for his work A Description of the Western Islands of Scotland (1703; second edition 1716). This book is particularly noted for its information on the St Kilda archipelago. Martin's description of St Kilda, which he visited in 1697, had also been published some years earlier as A Late Voyage to St Kilda (1698).

== Life ==
Martin was a native of Bealach, near Duntulm on Skye. He was born around 1660, a son of Donald Martin, who served with the MacDonalds of Sleat under James Graham, 1st Marquess of Montrose, and his wife Màiri, who was a niece of Sir Donald Gorme Og Macdonald, 1st Baronet. He is thought to have had at least two brothers, one of whom may have been tacksman at Flodigarry on Skye.

Martin graduated MA from the University of Edinburgh in 1681. Between 1681 and 1686, he was a tutor to Sir Donald Macdonald, 4th Baronet, and, from 1686 to 1695, he was tutor and governor to Ruaraidh Òg MacLeod of Harris. Much of this period was spent in Edinburgh where the young chief was a student at the university.

Martin undertook his voyage to St Kilda in May 1697 and his tour of Lewis in 1699 under the patronage of Hans Sloane, the Secretary of the Royal Society in London. The Scottish antiquary, Sir Robert Sibbald, considered that his command of Gaelic, knowledge of the customs of Gaeldom and connections with Hebridean elites made him well qualified for the task. He was an assiduous collector of natural specimens and minerals during his trips.

Both Samuel Johnson and Boswell read his book and took a copy of it along with them on their famous tour in 1773. Johnson felt Martin had failed to record the more interesting aspects of life at the time, and suggested that this was because he was unaware of just how different the social structure of the Western Isles was in comparison to life elsewhere. Some of Martin's descriptions of second sight and other superstitions led Johnson to regard him as credulous.

Martin is also known for his early descriptions of Scotch whisky:

Their plenty of Corn was such, as dispos'd the Natives to brew several sorts of Liquors, as common Usquebaugh, another call'd Trestarig, id est Aquavitae, three times distill'd, which is strong and hot; a third sort is four times distill'd, and this by the Natives is call'd Usquebaugh-baul, id est Usquebaugh, which at first taste affects all the Members of the Body: two spoonfuls of this last Liquor is a sufficient Dose; and if any Man exceed this, it would presently stop his Breath, and endanger his Life. The Trestarig and Usquebaugh-baul, are both made of Oats.

Early in 1708, Martin moved to London where he became tutor to the third son of the Earl of Bradford and accompanied him on a tour of Italy. In 1710, he entered Leiden University, and there graduated as MD, afterwards practicing medicine in London until his death. He was unmarried and died "of an Asthma" in Knightsbridge on 9 October 1718 aged around 58 years old.

== See also ==
- Description of the Western Isles of Scotland, by Donald Monro
- Hermetray
- Highland dress
- Thomas Pennant, a noted Welsh traveller who wrote much about Scotland
- Rockall
- Seonaidh
