= Walking with Dinosaurs (video game) =

2013 video game

- European cover art
- Developer: Supermassive Games
- Publisher: Sony Computer Entertainment
- Series: Walking with Dinosaurs
- Platform: PlayStation 3
- Release: NA: 12 November 2013; EU: 13 November 2013
- Genre: Augmented reality
- Mode: Single-player

Walking with Dinosaurs (or Wonderbook: Walking with Dinosaurs) is an augmented reality video game developed by Supermassive Games in collaboration with the BBC, as part of the resurgence of the "Walking with Dinosaurs", "Planet Dinosaur", "March of the Dinosaurs" and "Chased by Dinosaurs". It was released in Europe on 13 November 2013, and in North America on 12 November 2013, alongside Diggs Nightcrawler and Book of Potions.

== Gameplay ==
Wonderbook: Walking with Dinosaurs features multiple activities across five chapters, each of which is split into two sections, with each section involving a full "read" of the Wonderbook. Each chapter takes place at a different dig site, and begins with the player using the PlayStation Move controller to simulate different tools, with the goal of excavating the skeletal remains of a dinosaur, then using them to reconstruct the beast. From there, activities include battles between dinosaurs and mating rituals, where the Move controller is used to simulate movement and actions; using the Move controller as an X-ray torch to scan dinosaurs and explore their skeletons and organs, and balancing the weight of dinosaurs using different vehicles, among other activities.

The game also features questions to test the player's knowledge, with each section culminating in a five-question quiz. Each chapter also tells a different story, introducing different characters and dinosaur species. The first chapter features characters from the Walking with Dinosaurs feature film. Depending on their performance in the activities, the player will receive gold, silver, or bronze medals. Each activity also features a number of fact cards to find and collect. Players can then view their collection from a separate section of the game.

== Chapters ==
Chapter	Title	Location	Animals
Ch.1	The Great Exodus	Horseshoe Canyon Formation, Canada	Alexornis, Alphadon, Deinosuchus, Edmontosaurus, Gorgosaurus, Pachyrhinosaurus, Pentaceratops
Ch.2	March of the Titans	Auca Mahuevo, Argentina	Argentinosaurus, Mapusaurus, Pterodaustro
Ch.3	Terror in the Swamp	Bone Cabin Quarry, Wyoming	Allosaurus, Ceratosaurus, Diplodocus, Lepidotes, Stegosaurus
Ch.4	Impenetrable Fortress	Barun Goyot Formation, Mongolia	Gallimimus, Protoceratops, Tarbosaurus, Tarchia
Ch.5	King of Dragons	Hell Creek Formation, USA	Alexornis, Alphadon, Edmontosaurus, Pachycephalosaurus, Triceratops, Tyrannosaurus rex

== Reception ==
In a joint review with Book of Potions, The Daily Telegraph writer Andy Robertson (who also reviewed Diggs Nightcrawler) gave the game a positive review, noting the multiple uses of the Move controller and the quality of the storylines detailing the lives and interactions of different dinosaur species.
