= Vacsay =

Island in Scotland

Location
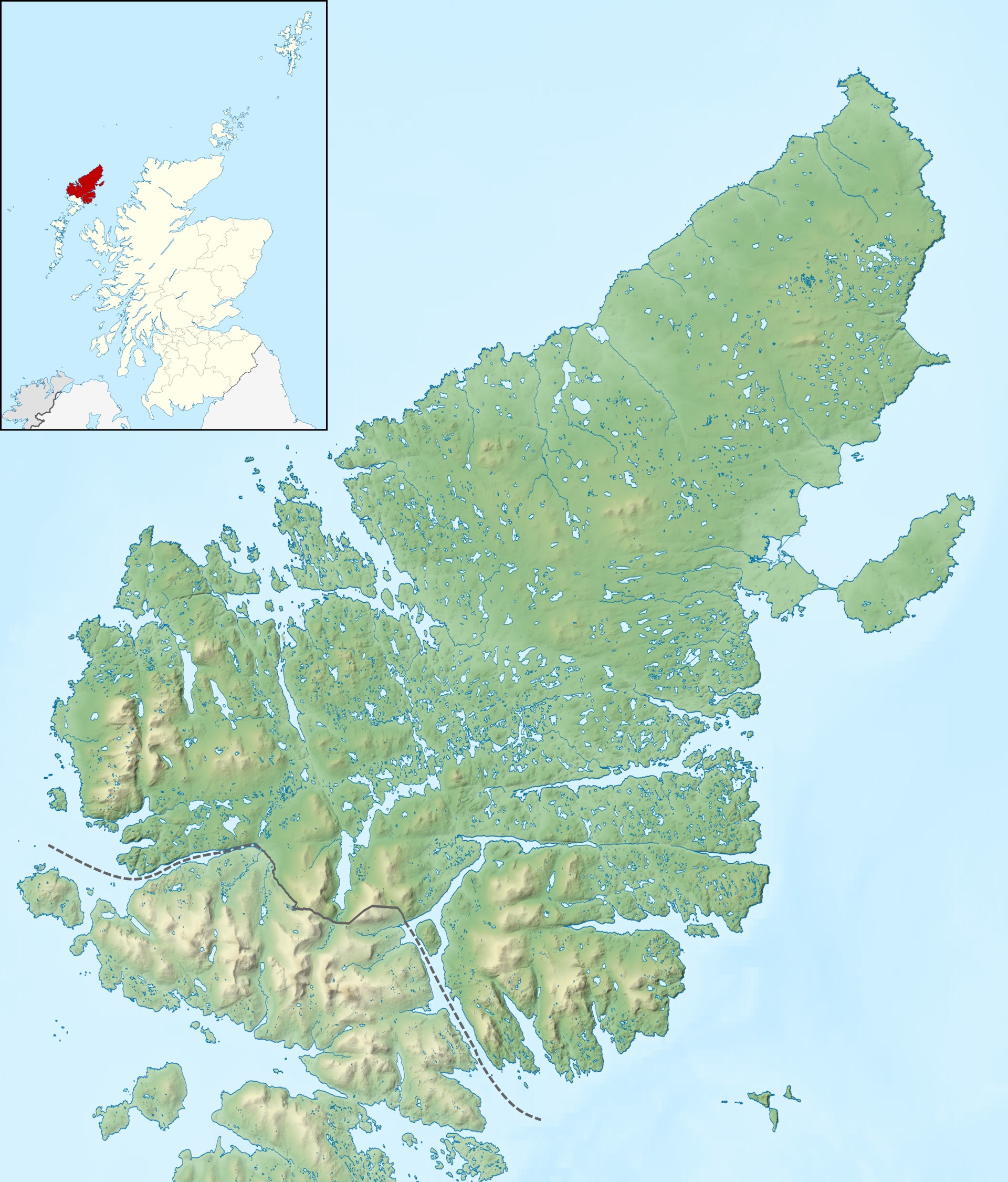
- Vacsay shown next to Lewis Vacsay shown within the Outer Hebrides
- OS grid reference: NB115370
- Coordinates: 58.23°N 6.91°W

Name
- Name meaning: peat bank or bay island
- Old Norse name: bakkiey or vagr-øy

Physical geography
- Island group: Lewis and Harris
- Area: 41 hectares (0.16 sq mi)
- Area rank: 217=
- Highest elevation: 34 m (112 ft)

Administration
- Council area: Outer Hebrides
- Country: Scotland
- Sovereign state: United Kingdom

Demographics
- Population: 0

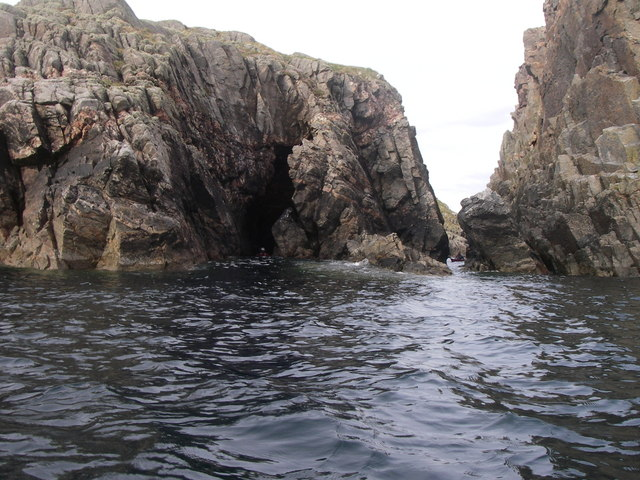
Northern part of Bhacsaigh

Vacsay (Scottish Gaelic: Bhacsaigh from Old Norse "bakkiey" meaning "peat bank island") is one of the Outer Hebrides. It is off the west coast of Lewis in West Loch Roag. It is 41 hectares (0.16 square miles) in size, and 34 metres (112 feet) at its highest point.

== History ==
Like many of the surrounding islands, Vacsay is uninhabited due to the Highland Clearances, which occurred here in 1827.

It was bought in 1993 by Sirdar Baron Iqbal Singh, a London business man, who currently lives in Lesmahagow. He has bought the title, "Lord of Butley Manor" and also wishes to rename Vacsay, "Robert Burns' island" or Eilean Burns, although Burns never visited the Outer Hebrides.

== Geography and geology ==
The island is Lewisian gneiss.

Vacsay has an extremely complicated coastline, and is connected at low tide to several surrounding islets such as Trathasam, and Liacam.

It is between the islands of Vuia Mòr and Pabay Mòr and is off Great Bernera.
