= Pabaigh Mòr =

Island in Scotland

Pabaigh Mòr (Gaelic)

Location
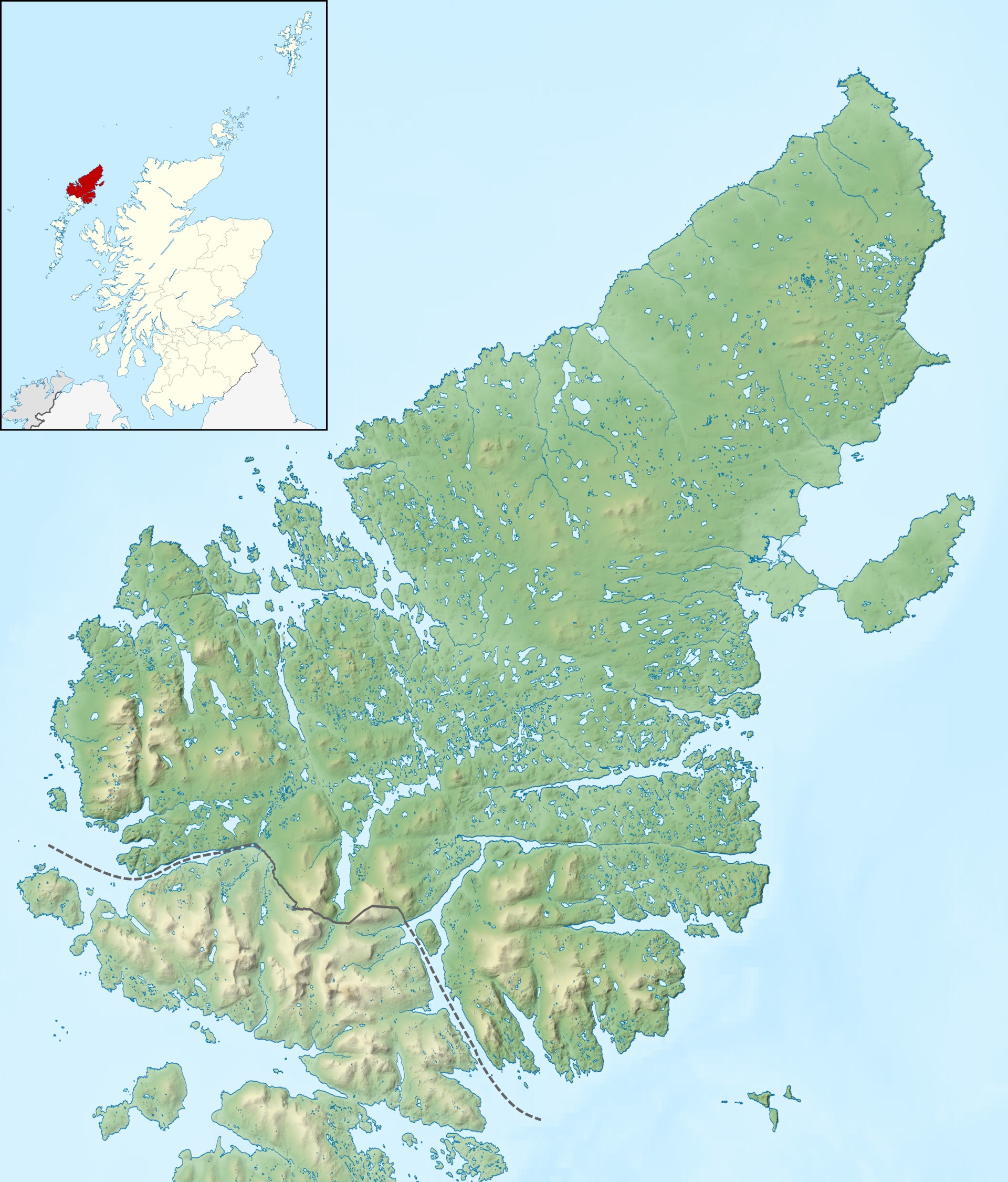
- Pabaigh Mòr shown next to Lewis Pabaigh Mòr within the Outer Hebrides
- OS grid reference: NB100380
- Coordinates: 58.23°N 6.94°W

Name
- Name meaning: island of the priest
- Old Norse name: pap-øy

Physical geography
- Island group: Lewis and Harris
- Area: 101 hectares (0.39 sq mi)
- Area rank: 148
- Highest elevation: Beinn Mhòr 68 metres (223 ft)

Administration
- Council area: Na h-Eileanan Siar
- Country: Scotland
- Sovereign state: United Kingdom

Demographics
- Population: 0

Pabay Mòr or Pabaigh Mòr is an uninhabited island in the Outer Hebrides of Scotland.

== History ==
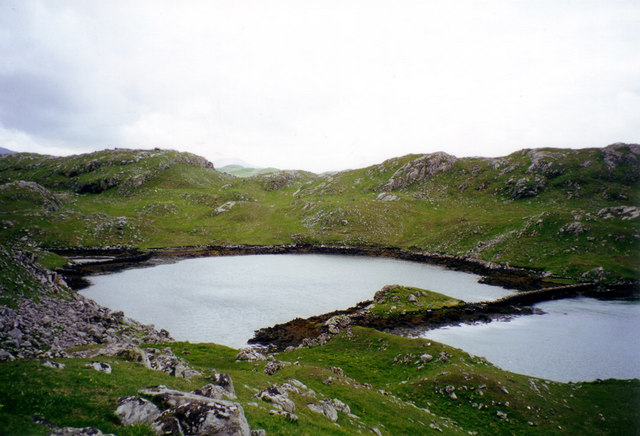
Old lobster lagoon

The island's name comes from papey, an Old Norse name meaning "Island of the papar or culdees". The island was connected to Clan MacLeod throughout much of its history.

In 1800, Sergeant Evander MacIver was given the island on retirement from the Seaforth Regiment in lieu of a pension. However, 27 years later, his family became victims of the Highland Clearances, and his descendants can be found in Valtos in neighbouring Lewis. It is said that the founder of Cunard was related to this family.

In World War I, it is suspected that a German U-boat landed surreptitiously at the island, and unloaded boxes of provisions, which were found later.

The current owner has restored a couple of blackhouses on the island, but it is uninhabited most of the time. Valtos crofters retain grazing rights on the island.

== Teampall Pheadair ==
The remains of Teampall Pheadair (St Peter's Church) and burial ground are in the south east around Loch na Teampall ("temple loch"). To the south east of the loch is Cnoc na Cille ("hill of the monk's cell").

A local tradition is that the church was used as a refuge by the MacLeods of Lewis. The church may have been damaged by artillery used during the Scottish Crown's campaign against the MacLeods of Lewis in 1506.

The church is now a scheduled monument.

== Geography and geology ==
Pabaigh Mòr lies off the west coast of Lewis in West Loch Roag, north of Vacsay. The island is Lewisian gneiss with a light soil. It has a number of caves, sea spouts, and natural arches. To the north, Pabay Beag is separated by a sheltered pool.

== Archaeology ==
In 1998, human remains were first observed eroding out of the beach on the eastern side of Island. Those remains were subsequently deposited in the Uig Museum. In 2002, further remains were found in the same location and archaeologists from GUARD Archaeology (then part of the University of Glasgow) excavated the site as part of the Historic Scotland Human Remains Call-off Contract. The remains were from a male, aged 50–59, who died approximately between 1450 – 1290 BC, during Scottish Bronze Age. The man was muscled but had a spinal joint disease. The remains of an infant was also recovered, along with some pottery.

== Media ==
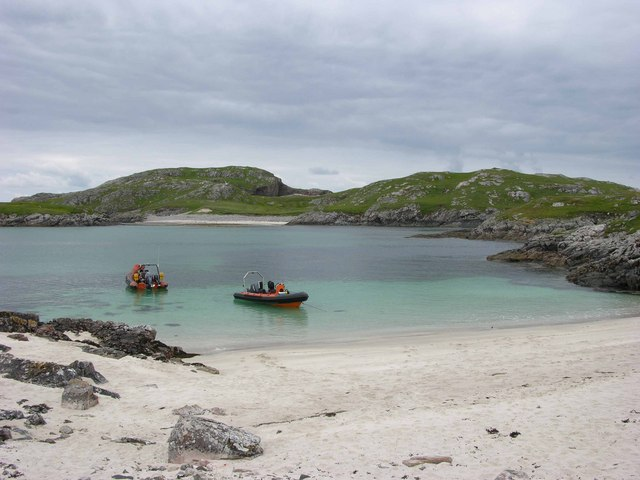
Lagoon on Pabbay Mor

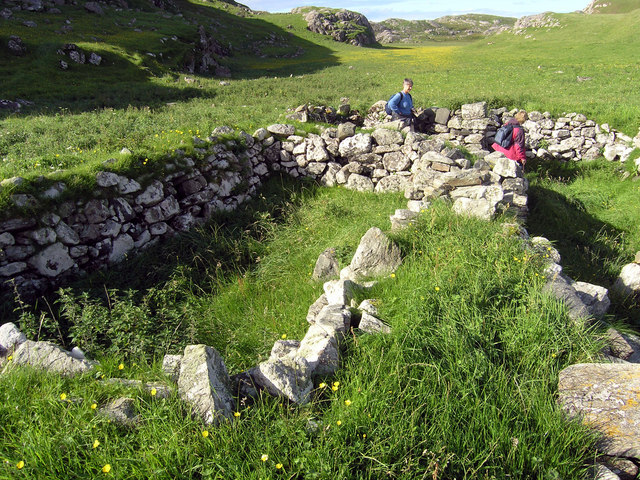
Blackhouse ruins on Pabbay

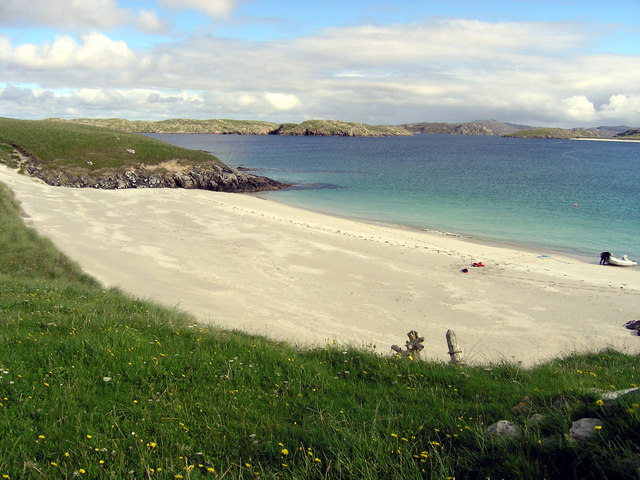
Beach on Pabbay Mor
