= Eilean Chearstaidh =

Island in Scotland

Eilean Cearstaigh (Gaelic)

Location
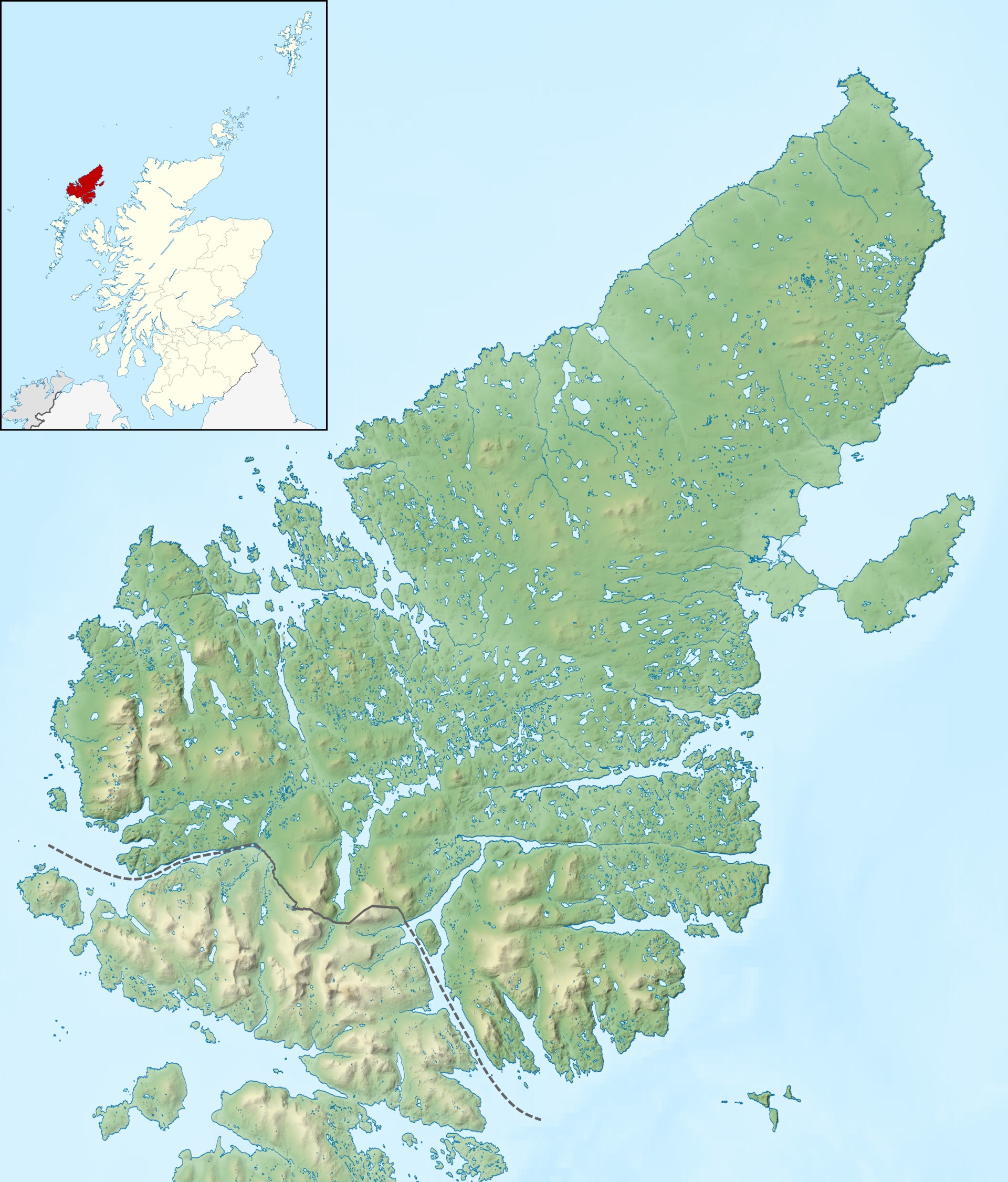
- Eilean Kearstay shown next to Lewis Eilean Kearstay within the Outer Hebrides
- OS grid reference: NB198333
- Coordinates: 58.2°N 6.77°W

Name
- Name meaning: "Hart island", from Norse

Physical geography
- Island group: Lewis and Harris
- Area: 77 ha (190 acres)
- Area rank: 166=
- Highest elevation: 37 m (121 ft)

Administration
- Council area: Outer Hebrides
- Country: Scotland
- Sovereign state: United Kingdom

Eilean Kearstay (Scottish Gaelic: Eilean Chearstaigh) is an uninhabited island in Loch Roag in the Outer Hebrides of Scotland.

It lies south east of Great Bernera, just across the water from the headland of Callanish.

In 1990 the island was sold by Prince Robin de la Lanne-Mirrlees to an Australian. It was sold to new owners three years later.
