= Great Bernera =

Island in Scotland

Beàrnaraigh Mòr (Gaelic)

Location
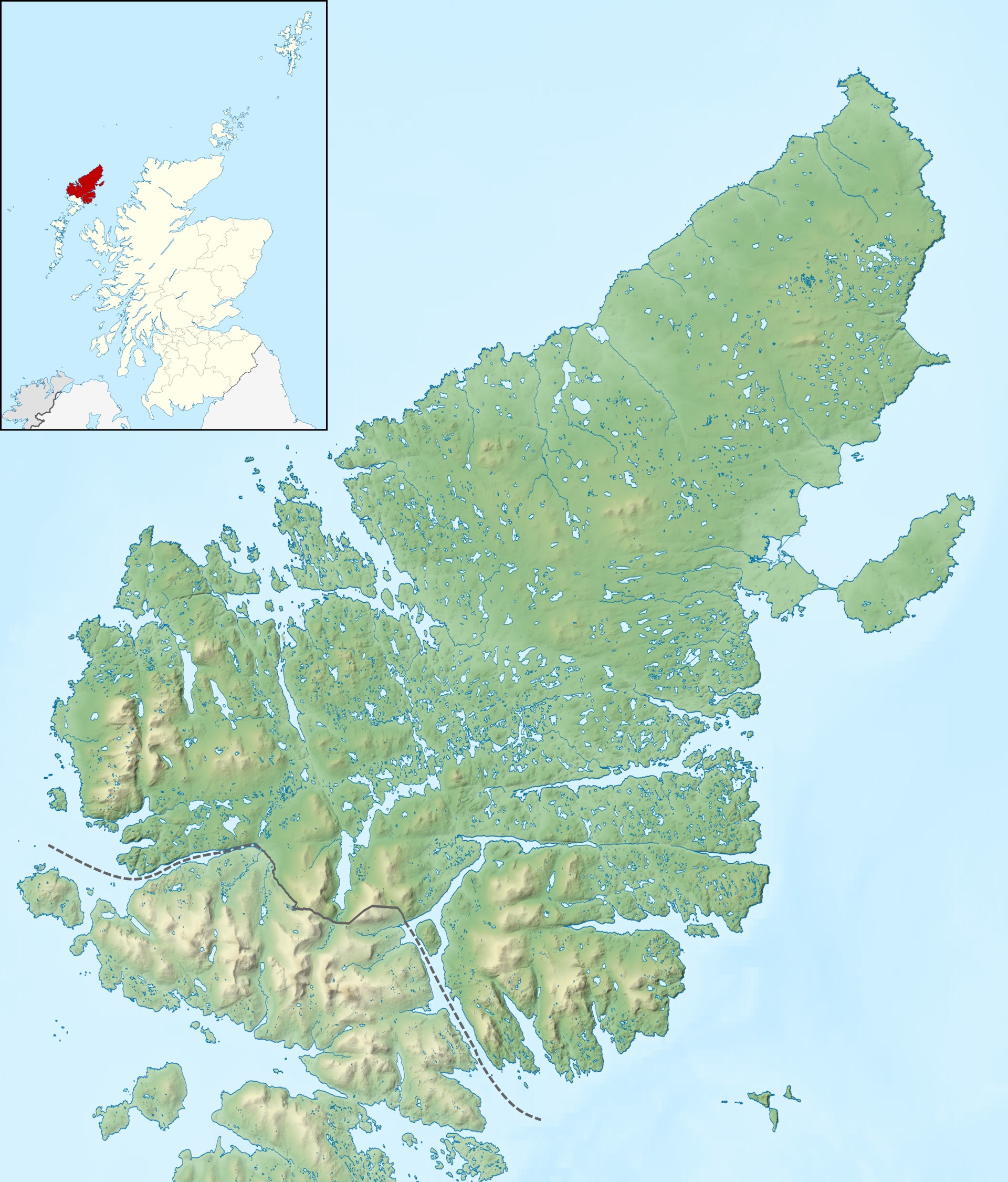
- Great Bernera shown next to Lewis Great Bernera shown within the Outer Hebrides
- OS grid reference: NB162344
- Coordinates: 58°13′48″N 6°51′0″W

Name
- Gaelic pronunciation: [ˈpjaːrˠn̪ˠəɾaj ˈmoːɾ]
- Name meaning: Bjørn's island from Norse
- Old Norse name: bjarnar-øy

Physical geography
- Island group: Lewis and Harris
- Area: 2,122 ha (5,240 acres)
- Area rank: 34
- Highest elevation: 87 m (285 ft)

Administration
- Council area: Na h-Eileanan Siar
- Country: Scotland
- Sovereign state: United Kingdom

Demographics
- Population: 212
- Population rank: 31
- Population density: 10/km^{2} (26/sq mi)
- Largest settlement: Breaclete

Great Bernera (/ˈbɜːrnərə/; Scottish Gaelic: Beàrnaraigh Mòr), often known just as Bernera (Scottish Gaelic: Beàrnaraigh), is an island and community in the Outer Hebrides of Scotland. With an area of just over 21 square kilometres (8 square miles), it is the thirty-fourth largest Scottish island.

Great Bernera lies in Loch Roag on the north-west coast of Lewis and is linked to it by a road bridge. Built in 1953, the bridge was the first pre-stressed concrete bridge in Europe. The main settlement on the island is Breaclete (Gaelic: Breacleit).

== History ==
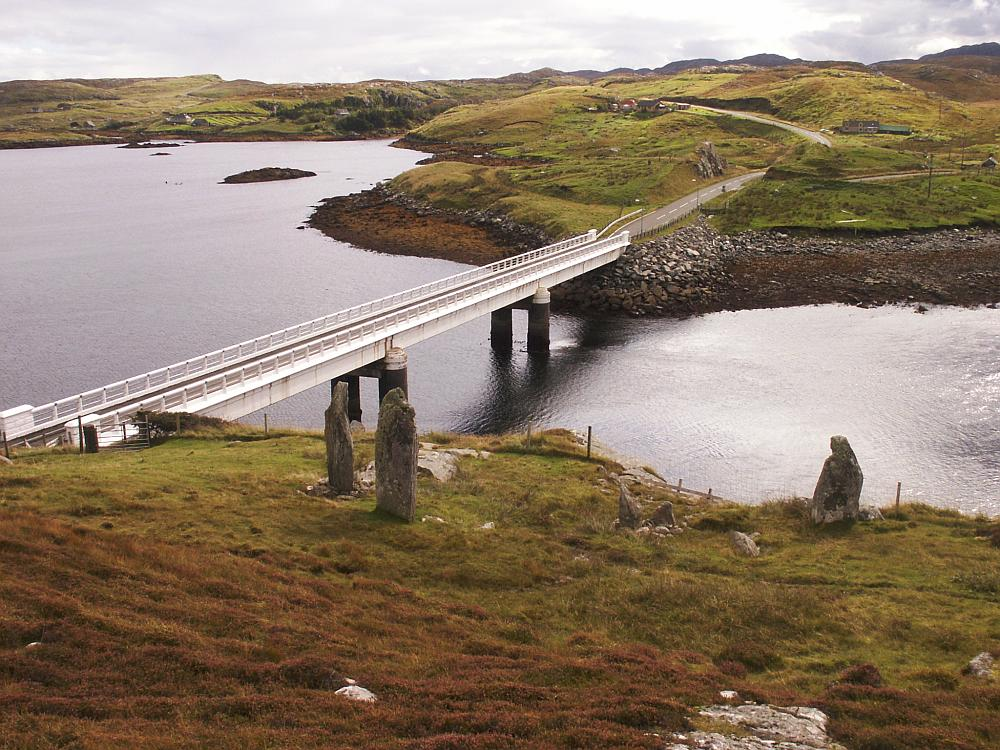
Tursachan, the Callanish VIII megalithic monument on Great Bernera overlooks the bridge from Lewis.

The island's name is Norse in origin and is derived in honour of Bjarnar, father of the Norse Chieftain of Lewis Ketil Bjarnarson (or the Flatneif). The vast majority of placenames in the district are similarly Norse, implying extensive Viking settlement.

The most common name on Great Bernera is MacDonald (MacDhòmhnaill or Dòmhnallach), and these are said to be descended from a watchman of the Macaulays of Uig, who gave him the island in return for his services.

After 1962 the island was owned by Robin de la Lanne-Mirrlees, a former Queen's Herald, who was recognised as Laird of Bernera. He eventually inherited the title Prince of Coronata and died in 2012. His home Bernera Lodge was at Kirkibost. Bernera was inherited by his grandson, Cyran. The island's residents are seeking to buy the land from him. The Mirrlees family commissioned a flag recognised by the Lord Lyon King of Arms.

== Kirkibost / Circeabost ==
In the southeast of the island is the first planned crofting township in the Outer Hebrides. It was created in 1805 by the regular allotting of individual crofts by the Earl of Seaforth's land surveyor, James Chapman. The tenants of this planned village were all evicted in 1823 and the publication of the first edition of the Ordnance Survey rather poignantly showed the deserted village and the original parallel croft boundaries. The village was resettled in 1878 and the original boundaries are still in use today.

== Calanais VIII ==
Callanish VIII is a unique standing stone arrangement near the bridge between Lewis and Bernera, set out in a semicircle. It is known locally as Tursachan, which means merely "Standing Stones". The ruins of Dun Barraglom broch are nearby.

== Bostadh ==
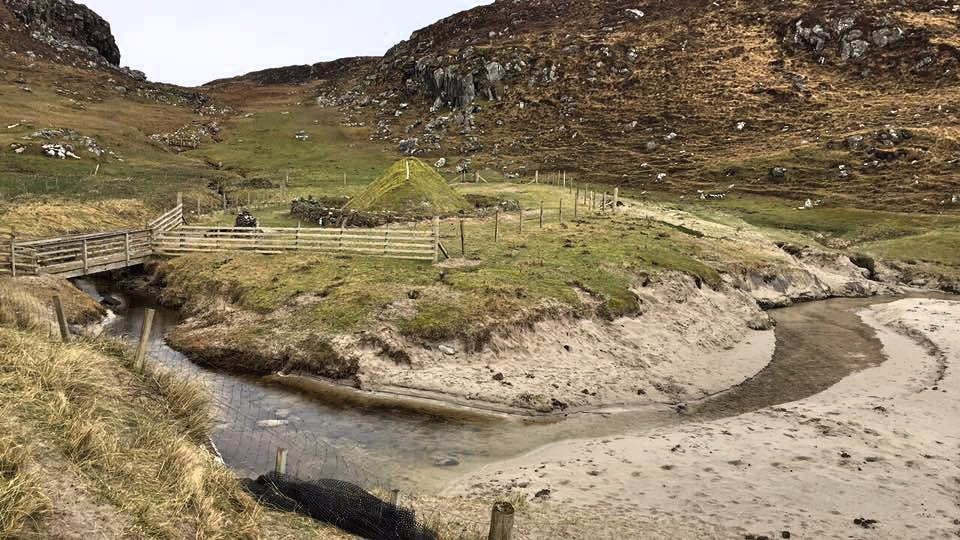
Iron Age house in Bostadh

Bernera is also known for its Iron Age (or possibly Pictish) settlement at Bostadh (or Bosta), discovered in 1992 and now covered by sand so that it is preserved. A replica Iron Age house matching those now buried is sited nearby.

Bostadh Beach is the location of a Time and Tide Bell, one of a series of installations by Marcus Vergette.

== Teampall Chirceaboist ==
Teampall Chirceaboist (St Marcel in Kirkibost) is the ruin of church, that is a scheduled monument. However, there is some debate about its actual location, local belief is that the scheduled monument is actually a more recent church, built around 1820, and the real Teampall Chirceaboist is located further up a hill.

== Bernera Riot ==
The island was the location of the Bernera Riot of 1874, when crofters resisted the Highland clearances. This was a peasant revolt and subsequent legal case which resulted in a victory for oppressed small-tenants against the heavy-handed evictions and treatment by Donald Munro, the factor of Sir James Matheson. The islanders refused to agree to remove their stock in favour of expanding sporting estates, and were in turn threatened with a military visit. This did not occur, but even more eviction notices were handed out, and the visitors were pelted with clods of earth. The legal case was the first recorded victory for small-tenants at will and the evidence that was heard at the eleven-hour trial paved the way for land reform in Scotland.

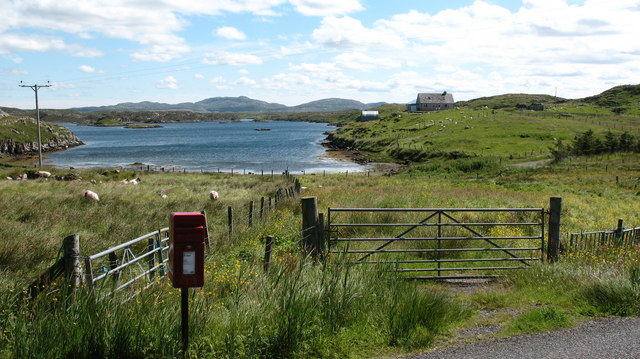
Tobson

== Geography and geology ==
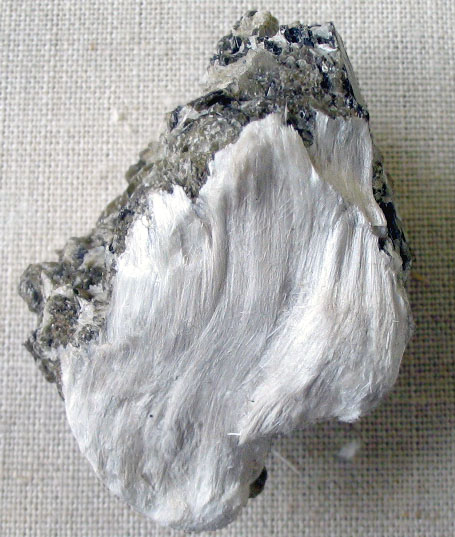
White fibrous tremolite on grey muscovite from Great Bernera

The island is roughly 8 kilometres (5 miles) long by 3 kilometres (2 miles) wide, the length being oriented from northwest to southeast. The coast is much indented and there are also numerous fresh water bodies such as Loch Barabhat, Loch Breacleit and Loch Niocsabhat. The highest point is the eminence of Sealabhal Bhiorach south of Bostadh and north of Tobson that reaches 87 metres (285 feet). There are deposits of muscovite and tremolite asbestos. An example of a rock of tremolite on muscovite from Great Bernera is shown in the photograph to the right.

The western side of the island is included in the South Lewis, Harris and North Uist National Scenic Area.

=== Surrounding islands ===
There are many islands in Loch Roag. To the west, from north to south are Pabaigh Mòr, Vacsay (Bhacsaigh), Fuaigh Mòr (Vuia Mòr), and Fuaigh Beag (Vuia Beg). To the north, the island of Bearnaraigh Beag (Little Bernera), and a number of islets. To the east, there are not so many islands, but there is Eilean Chearstaidh (Eilean Kerstay) to the southeast.

== Flora and fauna ==
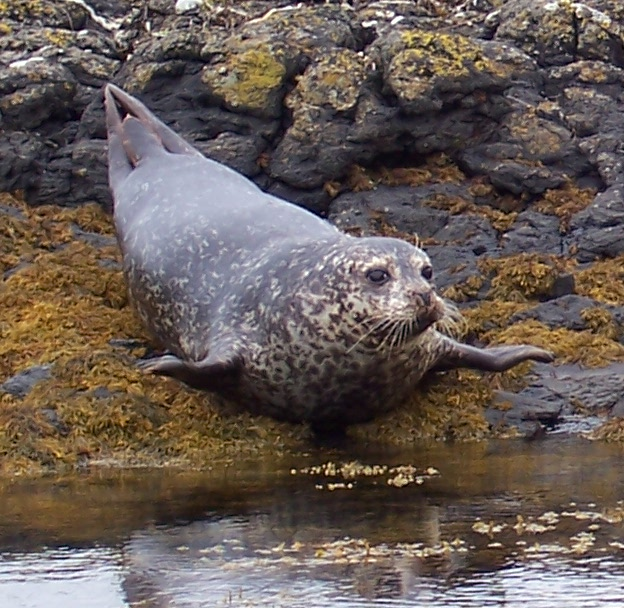
Atlantic seal (Halichoerus grypus)

Sea life is especially rich where there is tidal run between the Caolas Bhalasaigh (English: "Valasay Straits/Kyles") and the inner sea-loch of Tòb Bhalasaigh. There are numerous molluscs, sponges, brittlestars, and sea stars, the latter growing noticeably larger in size than normal. Cup coral, snakelocks anemone and dead man's fingers coral, may also be found here. Common fish include shanny and butterfish and Atlantic and common seals are regular off-shore visitors.

Great Bernera hosts numerous seabird species, including gulls, waders and ducks such as goldeneye. More unusually, a jack snipe was observed on the island in 2007.

== Economy and infrastructure ==
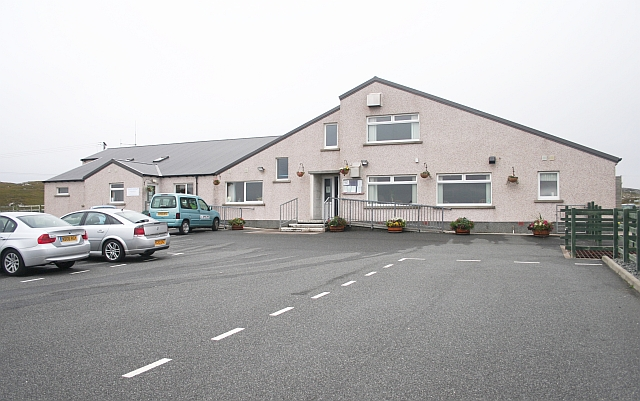
The community centre at Breacleit

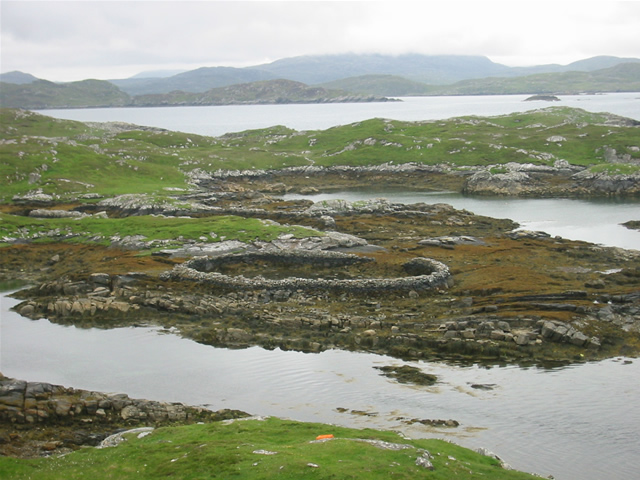
Lobster ponds

Great Bernera's population is mainly dependent on lobster fishing, crofting, tourism and arts & crafts. Fertile machair pasture permits sheep and cattle grazing. A processing plant was built at Kirkibost in 1972 which was later closed and redeveloped as a state-of-the-art music recording studio. In 2022, a new pontoon was built close to Kirkibost Pier and further developments such as camper van hook up points, laundrette and shower are opening in 2023. There are still a few weavers but this is no longer one of the main industries. Breacleit is home to a small museum, church, community centre with gym, sports halls, café and shop, self service fuel pump, electric vehicle charge points, fire station, community polytunnels and doctor's surgery.

Communications were much improved during the 20th century. The first telephone was installed on Lewis in 1897 and outlying villages were slowly connected. Great Bernera was the last exchange to link to Lewis with a single wire circuit and an earth return. Nowadays Bernera has access to fast fibre broadband, which has brought new employment opportunities. The bridge to the island from Lewis was built in 1953 and was one of the first constructed using pre-stressed concrete post-tensioned techniques in Europe. It was constructed after the islanders threatened to dynamite the hillside to create a causeway of their own making. The bridge is sometimes referred to as The Bridge over the Atlantic, though this designation is also used for other bridges in Scotland and Faroes. In 2020, during a structural survey serious faults were identified and in 2021 work began to build a single span Delta bridge. This bridge opened with celebrations on 15 December 2021.

In 2012 the island residents began a feasibility study to bring the island into community ownership, a process that has been successfully completed by the islanders of Gigha and Eigg. At the time of the 2011 census there were 252 people usually resident on the island, an increase of 8% on the figure of 233 for 2001. However, by 2022 the population had fallen to 212.

== Literature ==
The island, under the name of "Borva", was the setting for A Princess of Thule (1873) by the Scottish novelist William Black. The novel is notable for its descriptions of the local scenery.

== Notable people ==
- Murdo Stewart Macdonald Born on the island (1852–1938); the last of the Sea Barons and Lloyds Surveyor of Shipping.
- John Nicolson Macleod (1880–1954); Educationalist and writer. Was the schoolteacher resident in Bernera for many years. He was the author of the satirical collection of essays "Litrichean Alasdair Mhòir" and the definitive collection of poetry from Lewis "Bàrdachd Leòdhas".
- George Macleod Born on the island (1890–1969); a maritime model-maker of national recognition with examples of his work on exhibit in The National Maritime Museum, Greenwich and the Liverpool Ship Museum.
- Dr Peter John Macleod Born on the island (1896–1951); award-winning medical practitioner and specialist in rehabilitation of ex-servicemen.
- Callum Macdonald Born on the island (1912–99), arguably the most important publisher of Scottish poetry of the 20th century.
- Robin de la Lanne-Mirrlees (1925–2012). Owner and Laird of Great Bernera formerly resident in Kirkibost. Mirrlees was a researcher in heraldry and set out the flag of the island.
- Dòmhnall MacAmhlaigh Born on the island (1930–2017); Professor Emeritus in Celtic at the University of Aberdeen. He was one of the foremost modern Gaelic poets in Scotland and was a respected researcher in Norse/Gaelic placenames.
- Alistair Darling (1953–2023); UK politician. The former Chancellor of the Exchequer owned a converted blackhouse at Breaclete, and his mother's family were from the island. On 1 December 2015 he was created a life peer, taking the title 'Baron Darling of Roulanish, of Great Bernera in the county of Ross and Cromarty'.
- Cathy MacDonald Educated and resident in the district. Journalist and broadcaster who is the current anchor of numerous Gaelic television programmes.

== See also ==
- List of islands of Scotland
