= Hermetray =

Scottish uninhabited island

Theàrnatraigh (Gaelic)

Location
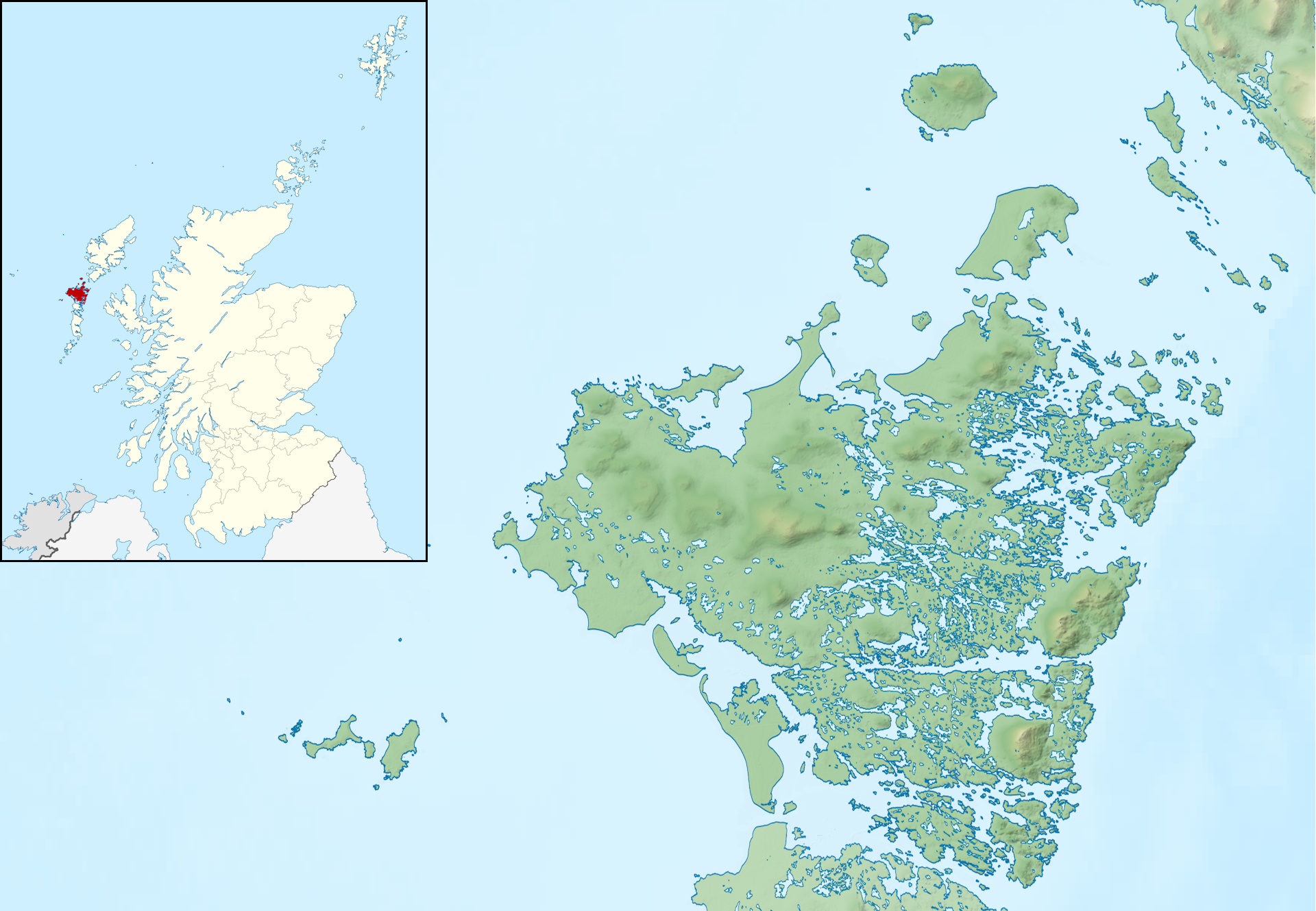
- Hermetray shown next to North Uist Hermetray shown within the Outer Hebrides
- OS grid reference: NF988741
- Coordinates: 57.66°N 7.049°W

Name
- Name meaning: "Hermund's Island"
- Old Norse name: Hermunðrs ey

Physical geography
- Island group: Uists and Barra
- Area: 72 ha (9/32 sq mi)
- Area rank: 171=
- Highest elevation: Cnoc a' Chombaiste, 35 m (115 ft)

Administration
- Council area: Na h-Eileanan Siar
- Country: Scotland
- Sovereign state: United Kingdom

Demographics
- Population: 0

Hermetray (Scottish Gaelic: Theàrnatraigh) is an uninhabited island off North Uist, in the Outer Hebrides of Scotland.

== Geography and geology ==
Hermetray lies in the Sound of Harris on the edge of the Minch. It is on the south side of the sound although it is in the parish of Harris. The island is 72 hectares (180 acres) in area, and 35 metres (115 feet) at its highest point, Cnoc a' Chombaiste (compass hill). The bedrock of the island is Lewisian gneiss.

The hillock of Cnoc a' Chombaiste is found to the northeast. The other main geomorphological features are Acarseid Mór (big harbour) to the west a "shallow and weedy inlet with a rocky shore" and Loch Hermetray at the island's centre. There are numerous surrounding islets. The largest is Vaccasay or Bhacasaigh (island with a bay) which extends to 29 hectares (72 acres) and lies to the west. Along with Fuam to the south and Hulmatraigh to the north this island encloses the sheltered Basin of Vaccasay. Fuam's full name in Gaelic is Fuam an Aon Fhoid, meaning "far out isle of the one peat" a reference to its shallow soils. Greineam and the skerries of Staffin and Creag na Stead lie to the north in the Grey Horse Channel and Grodaigh and the once fortified Dun Mhic Leathann to the south, beyond the Seòlaid na h-Eala and close to North Uist. This strait is named after the Eala Bhàn (white swan), a famous 17th century birlinn. Seòlaid means a sailing channel, "fairway in the sea" or anchorage.

Further northwest is the Cabbage Patch, a complex group of reefs and skerries including the islets of Opasaigh, Sàrstaigh and Nàrstaigh.

== History ==
The island's name is Norse, Hermunðr-øy meaning "Hermund's Island", although it is not known who this person was. The Ordnance Survey also refer to the islet by its Gaelic name of "Thernatraigh".

In 1549, Dean Monro wrote of "Hermodray" that it was a: "half mile lang, fertile and frutfull".

Martin Martin visited the island in 1695 and said of it, that it had: "moorish soil, covered all over almost in heath, except here and there, with a few piles of grass and the plant milkwort. Yet not withstanding this disadvantage, it is certainly the best spot of its extent for pasturage amongst these isles, and affords plenty of milk in January and February beyond what can be seen in other islands."

Martin Martin also mentions that there is:

"the foundation of a house built by the English in the reign of King Charles the First's time, for one of their magazines to lay up the cask, salt etc, for carrying on the fishery, which was then begun in the Western Islands; but this design miscarried because of the civil wars which then broke out."

Martin was referring to Lord Seaforth's fishery, set up in 1633, but which collapsed a mere seven years later. It was part of Charles I's "Company of the General Fishery of Great Britain & Ireland".

In 1841, a population of 8 was recorded as living on the island in a single household. Ordnance Survey maps published in 1881 showed six unroofed buildings on the island, which has remained uninhabited since the mid-19th century. A sheep fank at Acarseid Mór may be on the site of the 1841 house. North Uist was much affected by the Highland Clearances from where there was large scale emigration to Cape Breton in Canada but no certain reasons for the abandonment of Hermetray have come to light.

In 1920, a Norwegian ship, the Puritan was wrecked here. Reportedly the three survivors would not partake of a crate of whisky which was wrecked with them, and did not thank their rescuer, Alasdair Beag of Berneray, when he arranged for them to be returned to their home country. The Hebrideans explained this by the name of the ship, although the survivors spoke neither Scottish Gaelic nor English.

Heremtray is currently owned by the Scottish Government and there is a fish farm in the Basin of Vaccasay.

== Wildlife ==
Gulls and buzzards nest in the low cliffs and escaped American mink have been trapped on the island during an eradication programme. Fish are absent from Loch Hermetray. The flora includes adder's tongue, flag iris, bog cotton, ragged robin and white clover.

== In popular culture ==
In the Harry Potter universe, at some point in the 16th century Zygmunt Budge, an accomplished maker of potions, took up residence on Hermetray after leaving Hogwarts in protest at the age of 14. Living alone, he continued his studies and eventually wrote the Book of Potions.

== See also ==
- List of islands of Scotland
