= Book of Spells =

2012 video game

- European cover art
- Developer(s): London Studio
- Publisher(s): Sony Computer Entertainment
- Series: Wizarding World
- Platform(s): PlayStation 3
- Release: NA: 13 November 2012; AU: 15 November 2012; EU: 16 November 2012
- Genre(s): Augmented reality
- Mode(s): Single-player

Book of Spells (or Wonderbook: Book of Spells) is a 2012 augmented reality game developed by London Studio and published by Sony Computer Entertainment for the PlayStation 3. It serves as a companion to the Harry Potter series and is based on Book of Spells, a fictional book by Miranda Goshawk released about 200 years from the event date. Book of Spells received mostly positive reviews from critics, praising the use of augmented reality and the PlayStation Move, while criticizing the game's short length.

== Gameplay ==
The user casts spells by drawing shapes with the PlayStation Move controller, while the book itself uses augmented reality technology to appear on screen via the PlayStation Eye. The Move controller itself appears on screen as a wand, and may draw patterns on screen to launch spells.

Book of Spells is designed to be an interpretation of learning spells at Hogwarts School of Witchcraft and Wizardry in the Harry Potter universe, with the "book" itself having been written in the Harry Potter universe over 200 years ago by Miranda Goshawk. At the end of each chapter, a poem will describe a failed Hogwarts student in order to teach the user a lesson in the manner of Aesop's Fables.

At the start of the game, players choose one of the four Hogwarts houses, and one of three different wands. If, however, the player has a Pottermore account, they can link it to the game, in which case the in-game choices will reflect those they made on the site.

In addition to the specific spells covered by each chapter, the player is sometimes given the opportunity to briefly make use of other spells, such as the Oppugno Jinx. The player, however, does not actually learn the gestures for these spells and thus is not tested over this material.

== Development ==
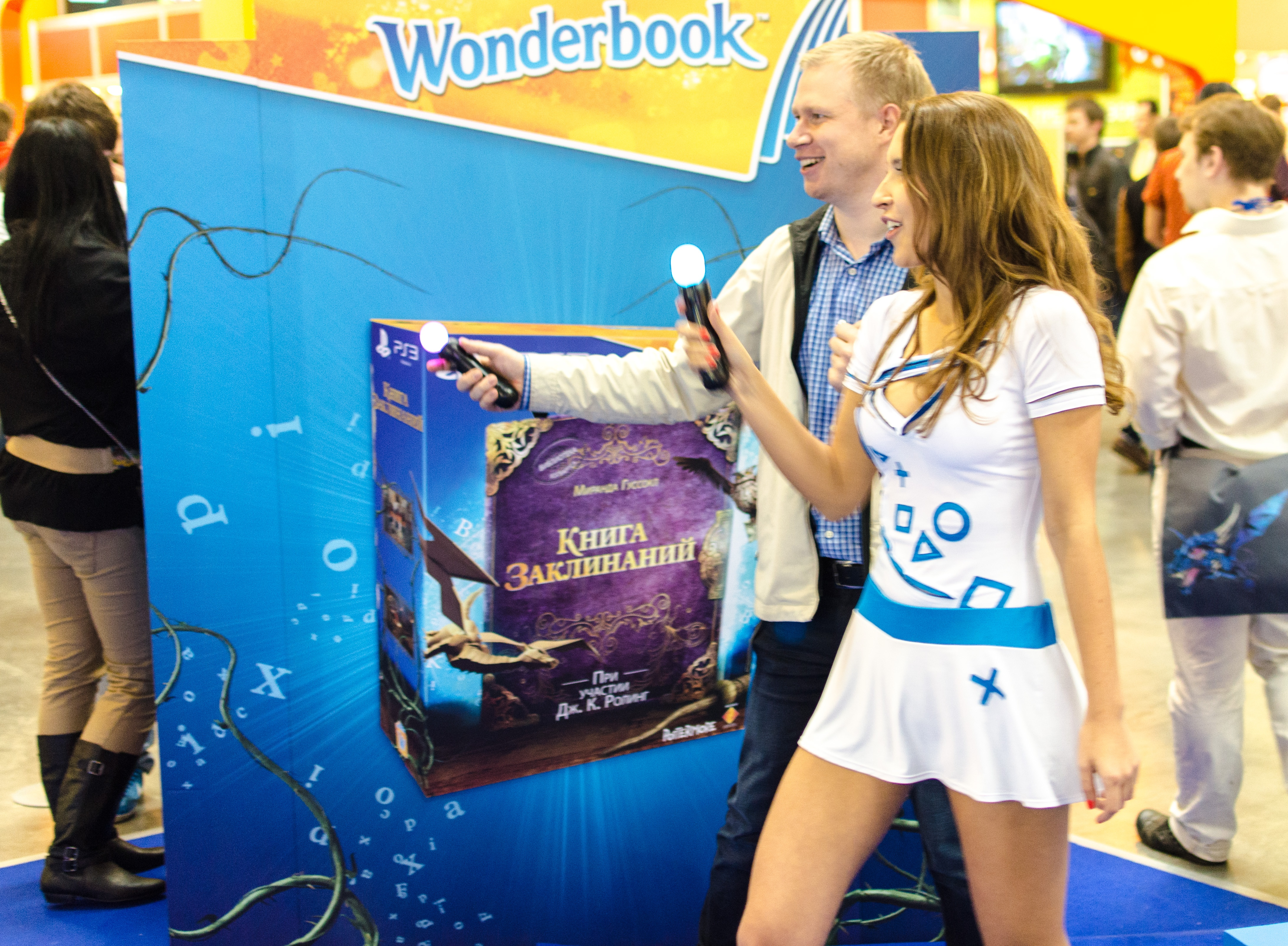
Promotion at IgroMir 2012

To develop the game the Sony Computer Entertainment team worked with Harry Potter author J. K. Rowling, who described it as "the closest a Muggle can come to a real spellbook". Rowling had previously worked with Sony on her Pottermore website, and the company at one point had an exclusive contract to release Harry Potter e-books. The game was launched as the first title for the Wonderbook on the PlayStation 3 at the 2012 Electronic Entertainment Expo. It was released in the United States on 13 November, 15 November in Australia, and 16 November in Europe.

== Reception ==
Book of Spells received mixed-to-positive reviews from game critics. It holds a 72 on Metacritic, indicating "Mixed or Average reviews." Critics praised the use of the Wonderbook technology by the use of both the PlayStation Move and augmented reality, while criticizing the game's short replay value. The Book of Spells was nominated for a BATA in the 'Game Innovation 2013' category.

== Sequel ==
The second Harry Potter-themed Wonderbook game is Book of Potions, released in 2013.
