= Breaclete =

Coordinates: 58.230°N 6.838°W

Breacleit: Scottish Gaelic: Brèaicleit; Norse: Breiðiklettr
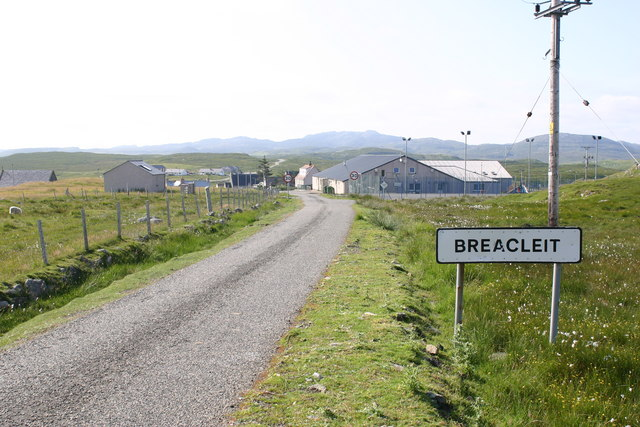
- Breacleit on Great Bernera

- Location within the Outer Hebrides
- Language: Scottish Gaelic; English
- OS grid reference: NB160369
- Civil parish: Uig
- Council area: Na h-Eileanan Siar
- Lieutenancy area: Western Isles
- Country: Scotland
- Sovereign state: United Kingdom
- Post town: ISLE OF LEWIS
- Postcode district: HS2
- Dialling code: 01851
- Police: Scotland
- Fire: Scottish
- Ambulance: Scottish
- UK Parliament: Na h-Eileanan an Iar
- Scottish Parliament: Na h-Eileanan an Iar

Breacleit (or Roulanish; Scottish Gaelic: Breacleit; Old Norse: Breiðiklettr) is the central village on Great Bernera in the Outer Hebrides, Scotland. Breaclete is within the parish of Uig. Although the village name comes from a geographical feature rather than a steading it is generally believed to be an ancient settlement. The oldest building in the village is the thatched water mill by the shore of Loch Risay which was restored in the 1990s. It was formerly a tiny crofting and fishing settlement of just 12 crofts surrounding the natural harbour of Loch Beag but crofting has now ceased and holiday homes have taken over. The earliest clearly mapped reference is on Murdoch MacKenzie's first Admiralty chart surveyed in 1748. In 1851 J.M. MacKenzie, the Chamberlain to the estate owner Sir James Matheson, proposed that all the tenants of the village were to be evicted and sent to North America on the emigrant ship the SS Marquis of Stafford. This plan was not fully carried through however but it still had a great effect on the village leaving it with a population of just three families. This population was later supplemented through evictions elsewhere notably the clearances of Hacklete and Barragloum villages in the south of Great Bernera.

== Literature ==
In 1939 the author Neil Gunn stayed in Breaclete and wrote some of his essays for the book Highland Pack there. His experience of staying with Dr PJ Macleod and leaving Loch Beag in the fishing vessel "Rhoda" for the Flannan Isles provide an invaluable insight into pre-war Hebridean life. This experience was also the inspiration for the most critically acclaimed writing in his most famous work ("The Silver Darlings"). Also of literary interest are the writings of the former schoolmaster John Nicolson Macleod who lived in the village in the early part of the twentieth century. Writing under the pseudonym Alasdair Mòr (named after the first mate of the "Rhoda" from croft number 11), his weekly series of highly entertaining articles in the Stornoway Gazette called "Litir à Beàrnaraigh" ("A Letter from Bernera") were collected into a book "Litrichean Alasdair Mhòir" ("The Letters of Alasdair Mòr") in 1932. These essays outline the distinctive wit, character, courage and craftsmanship of the people of the village and the island of Bernera. John Nicolson Macleod while living in Breaclet was also responsible for compiling the definitive collection of Gaelic poetry from the Isle of Lewis simply titled “Bàrdachd Leòdhais” ("Poetry of Lewis"). This undertaking finally published in 1916 took him thirteen years to collect. This was done through oral transcript from various sources all over the island which then had a population of over 30,000 accessed by very backward infrastructure. The completed work features poetry from three villagers from Breaclet: Donald MacDonald and Angus MacDonald from croft Number 12 and Angus MacKenzie from croft Number 8. The publication was re-published in 1955.

== Notable people ==
Breaclete produced a golden generation of talent in the early twentieth century with most families producing at least one university graduate in addition to regular duxes of the Nicolson Institute.

=== Callum Macdonald ===
Callum Macdonald (1912–1999) was born at croft number 10, an Edinburgh history graduate and WW2 Squadron Leader. He was an important literary figure in Scotland, publishing works by Hugh MacDiarmid, Sydney Goodsir Smith, Norman MacCaig, Sorley MacLean and Iain Crichton Smith. An exhibition celebrating his contribution to Scottish and Gaelic literature was held in the National Library of Scotland on the occasion of his 75th birthday in 1987 and his portrait was hung in the Scottish National Portrait Gallery in 1997 to celebrate his 85th birthday.

=== Dr PJ MacLeod ===
Peter John MacLeod (1896–1951) was born at croft number 6. He was an award-winning medical doctor who pioneered the rehabilitation of ex servicemen at Gleneagles and Bridge of Earn as well as extensive service with the RAMC. His work was an early study in understanding the effects of posttraumatic stress disorder and was important enough for King George VI to visit in 1943. He conducted a very successful lecture tour of the US and Canada with the Rockefeller Travelling Fellowship in 1949.

=== Alistair Maclean Darling ===
Alistair Maclean Darling, Baron Darling of Roulanish, PC (28 November 1953 – 30 November 2023) was a British politician who served as Chancellor of the Exchequer under prime minister Gordon Brown from 2007 to 2010. A member of the Labour Party, he was a member of Parliament (MP) from 1987 to 2015, representing Edinburgh Central and Edinburgh South West. Darling was resident at croft Number 12 and the family now also own croft Number 11.

== Character of the village ==
Breaclete is today home to a small museum, mini-mart & off licence, Bernera School (opened 1881), Bernera Post Office, Lochs-in-Bernera Church (1880), former Free Kirk (1890), War Memorial (1922), Bernera Community Centre with café (1976), petrol station, recreation ground, fire station and doctor's surgery. Many of the older buildings were constructed from Lewisian gneiss hewn from the nearby quarry of Buaile Chruidh. The village has about 35 houses with the oldest 'whitehouse' dating from 1911.
