= Tessa Ransford =

Scottish poet

Tessa Ransford OBE
- Born: 8 July 1938; Mumbai
- Died: 2 September 2015 (aged 77); Edinburgh
- Education: University of Edinburgh
- Known for: Founding director of the Scottish Poetry Library
- Notable work: Not Just Moonshine: new and selected poems (2008); Rug of a Thousand Colours (2012); Don’t Mention This to Anyone (2012); Made in Edinburgh; A Good Cause

Teresa Mary ("Tessa") Ransford OBE (8 July 1938 – 2 September 2015) was a poet, activist and the founding director of the Scottish Poetry Library.

== Biography ==
Teresa Ransford was born in Mumbai, India on 8 July 1938. Her mother was Lady Torfrida Ransford and her father was Sir Alister Ransford, Master of the Mint of Mumbai. The family moved back to the United Kingdom in 1944, finally moving to Scotland in 1948 when her father took up the position of bursar at the Loretto School in Musselburgh.

Ransford was educated and boarded at St Leonard’s School in St Andrews. She was not happy and turned to books and poetry for consolation. She went on to study German and Philosophy at the University of Edinburgh.

In 1959, she married Iain Kay Stiven, a minister of the Church of Scotland and the pair lived in Pakistan until 1968 with their four children. During the 1970s, Ransford started writing and publishing poems and founded the School of Poets in 1981 as a place for poets to gather on a monthly basis to support one another.

Ransford produced over fifteen volumes of poetry during her lifetime.

The Scottish Poetry Library had 300 books when she started it in 1984. By the time she died, it had over 30,000.

She was awarded the Officer of the Most Excellent Order of the British Empire (OBE) in 2000 for services to the Scottish Poetry Library and was President of Scottish PEN from 2003 to 2006.

Ransford was diagnosed with cancer in 2015 and died in Edinburgh on 2 September that year.

== Notable works ==
- Light of the Mind (1980)
- Shadows from the Greater Hill (1987)
- The Nightingale Question (2004)
- Not Just Moonshine: new and selected poems (2008)
- Rug of a Thousand Colours (2012)
- Don’t Mention This to Anyone (2012)
- Made in Edinburgh
- A Good Cause

== Reviews ==
- Mills, Paul (1982), The Individual Voice, which includes a review of Light of the Mind, in Murray, Glen (ed.), Cencrastus No. 8, Spring 1982, pp. 45 & 46, ISSN 0264-0856

== See also ==
- Tom Hubbard
- Scottish Poetry Library
