= Little Bernera =

Island in Scotland

Beàrnaraigh Beag (Gaelic)

Location
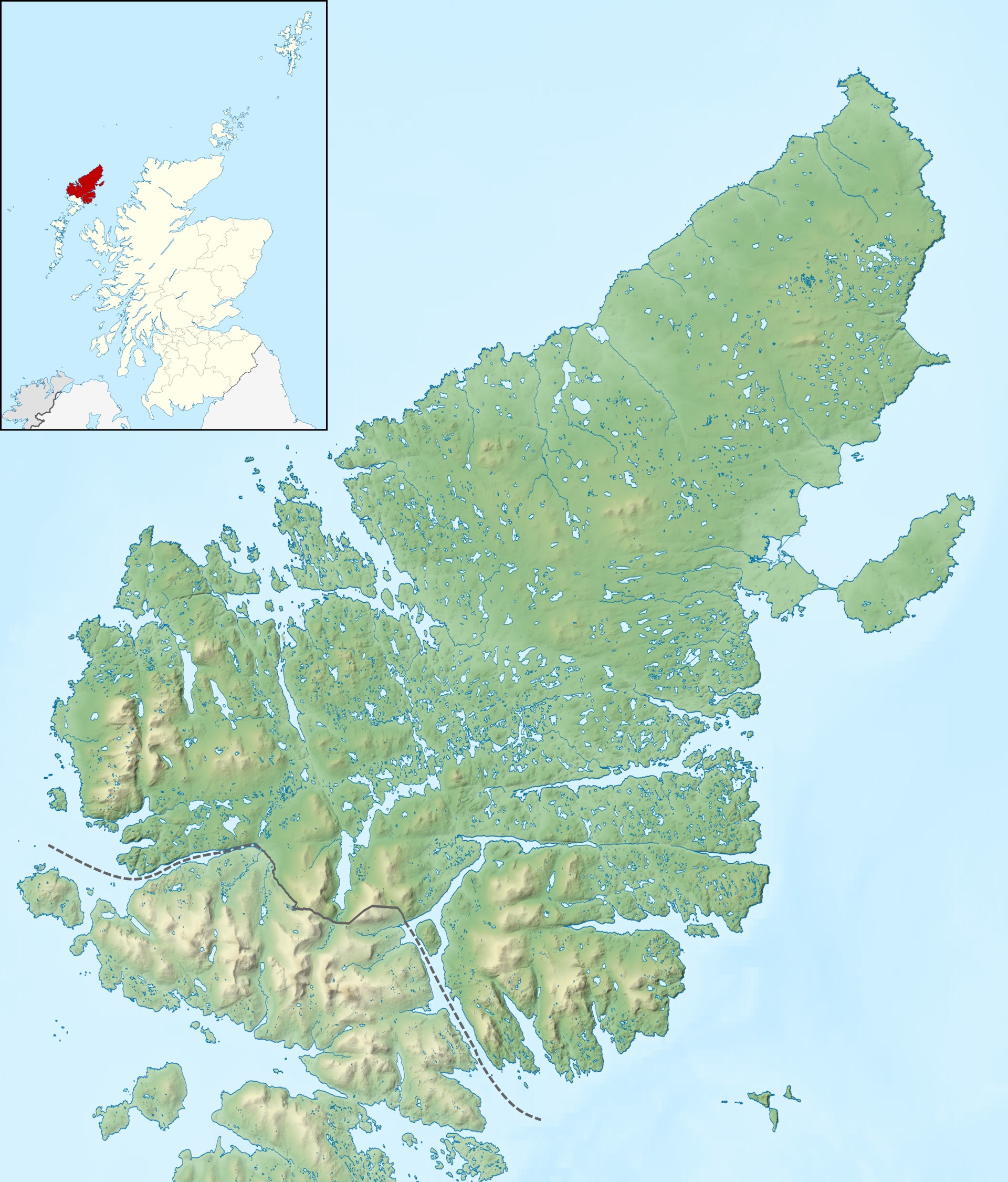
- Little Bernera shown next to Lewis Little Bernera shown within the Outer Hebrides
- OS grid reference: NB142410
- Coordinates: 58.27°N 6.87°W

Name
- Name meaning: Bjørn's island, from Norse
- Old Norse name: bjarnar-øy

Physical geography
- Island group: Lewis
- Area: 138 ha (340 acres)
- Area rank: 129=
- Highest elevation: Tordal 41 m

Administration
- Council area: Outer Hebrides
- Country: Scotland
- Sovereign state: United Kingdom

Demographics
- Population: 0

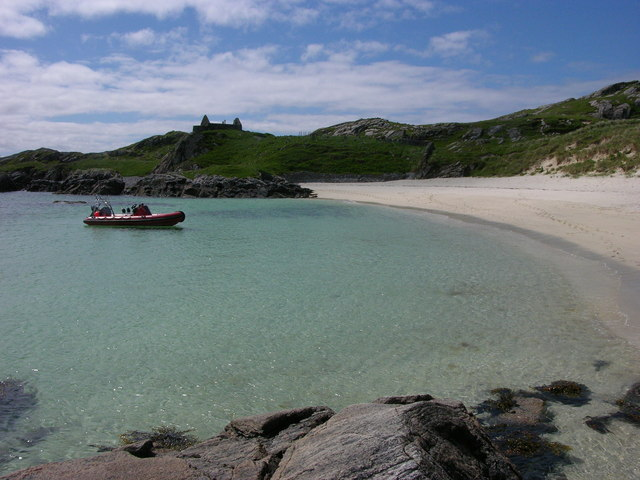
Traigh an Teampaill with ruined church

Little Bernera (Scottish Gaelic: Beàrnaraigh Beag) is a small island situated off the west coast of the Isle of Lewis in the Outer Hebrides.

Little Bernera lies between the sea lochs of West and East Loch Roag, immediately to the north of Great Bernera. The island rises to a height of 42 metres (138 feet) and has an area of 138 ha. The west of the island is extremely rugged and differs significantly from the machair land of the eastern side which benefits from the blown shell sand of the beaches of Tràigh Mhòr and Tràigh na Teampuill.

== History ==
The island has evidence of continuous settlement for centuries notably in the remains of former dwellings and chapels. The last tenants were forcibly evicted in 1825 when the island was turned into a satellite of Linshader farm. Following the clearance of the island the only habitable building as noted on the first edition of the Ordnance Survey was the slated fish curing-house.

The island also contained a school set up by the SSPCK.

A few centuries ago, the island was the place where people of Carloway were buried, before a cemetery was built in that village. Today, gravestones can still be seen on the island, but are beginning to disappear into the ground.

The island was owned by Count Robin Mirrlees. When he died in 2012 he left the Island to the National Trust for Scotland.

== Landmarks ==
=== Tràigh an Teampaill ===
At Tràigh an Teampaill, there is the ruined chapel of St Michael and an adjacent cemetery. The island is also the site of the former chapel of St Dondans of which no trace remains but is generally believed to be sited in the very north-west near Mol Mòr. There is a folk story that a Norse king, Swain, took Gealchos, the daughter of a young priest, from Tràigh an Teampaill to Norway, but her heart broke mourning for Little Bernera, so he brought her back.

=== Teampull Bhearnaraidh Bheag ===
Teampull Bhearnaraidh Bheag' is a graveyard on a small sandy hill. Tradition says that there has been a Catholic chapel in this place but there is no trace of it now.
