= Borve Castle =

Borve Castle may refer to:

- Borve Castle, Benbecula a stronghold of the Clan Donald.
- Borve Castle, Sutherland a stronghold of the Clan Mackay.
