= Eilean a' Ghiorr =

Bridged island in the Outer Hebrides of Scotland

Eilean a' Ghiorr (Gaelic)
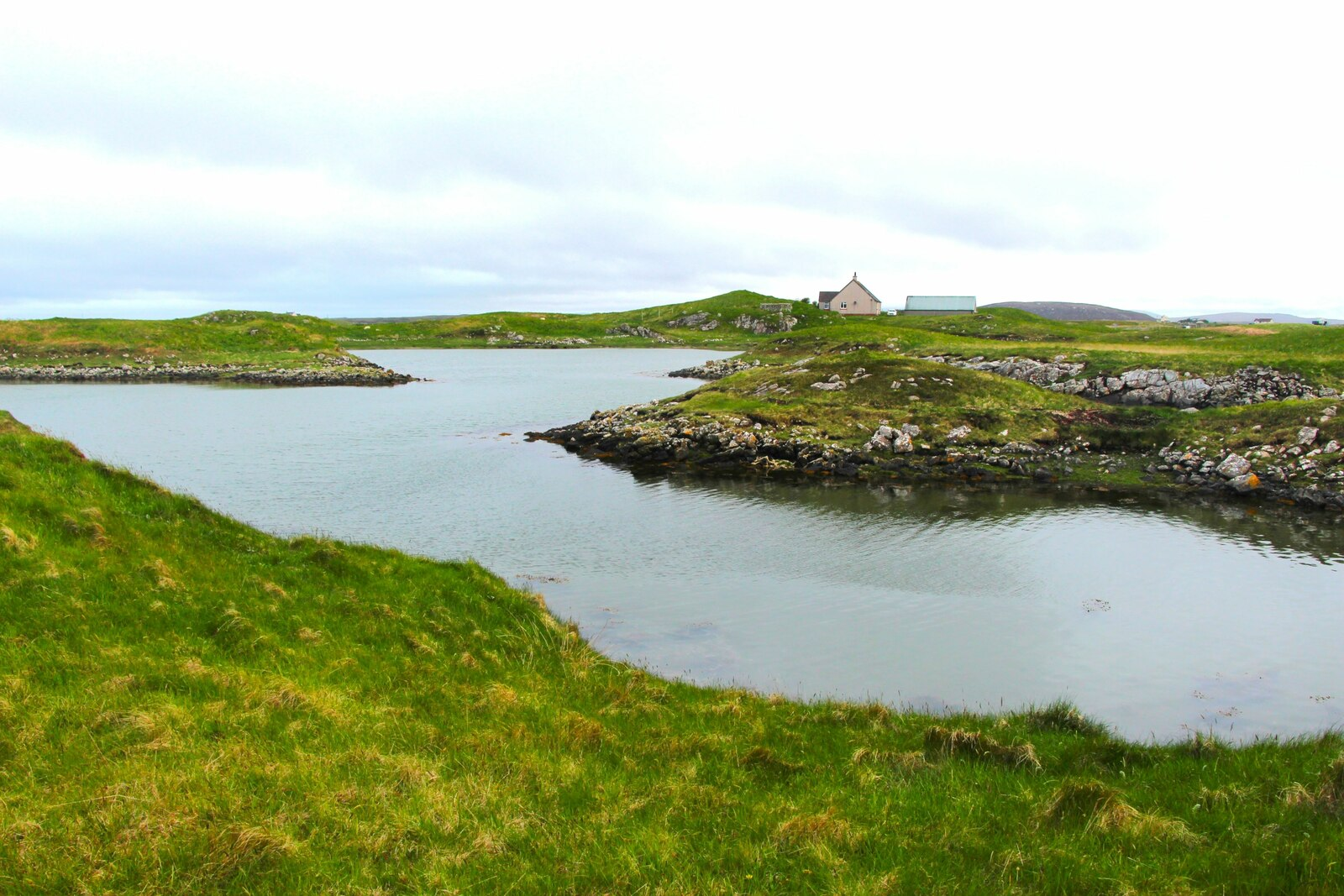

Location
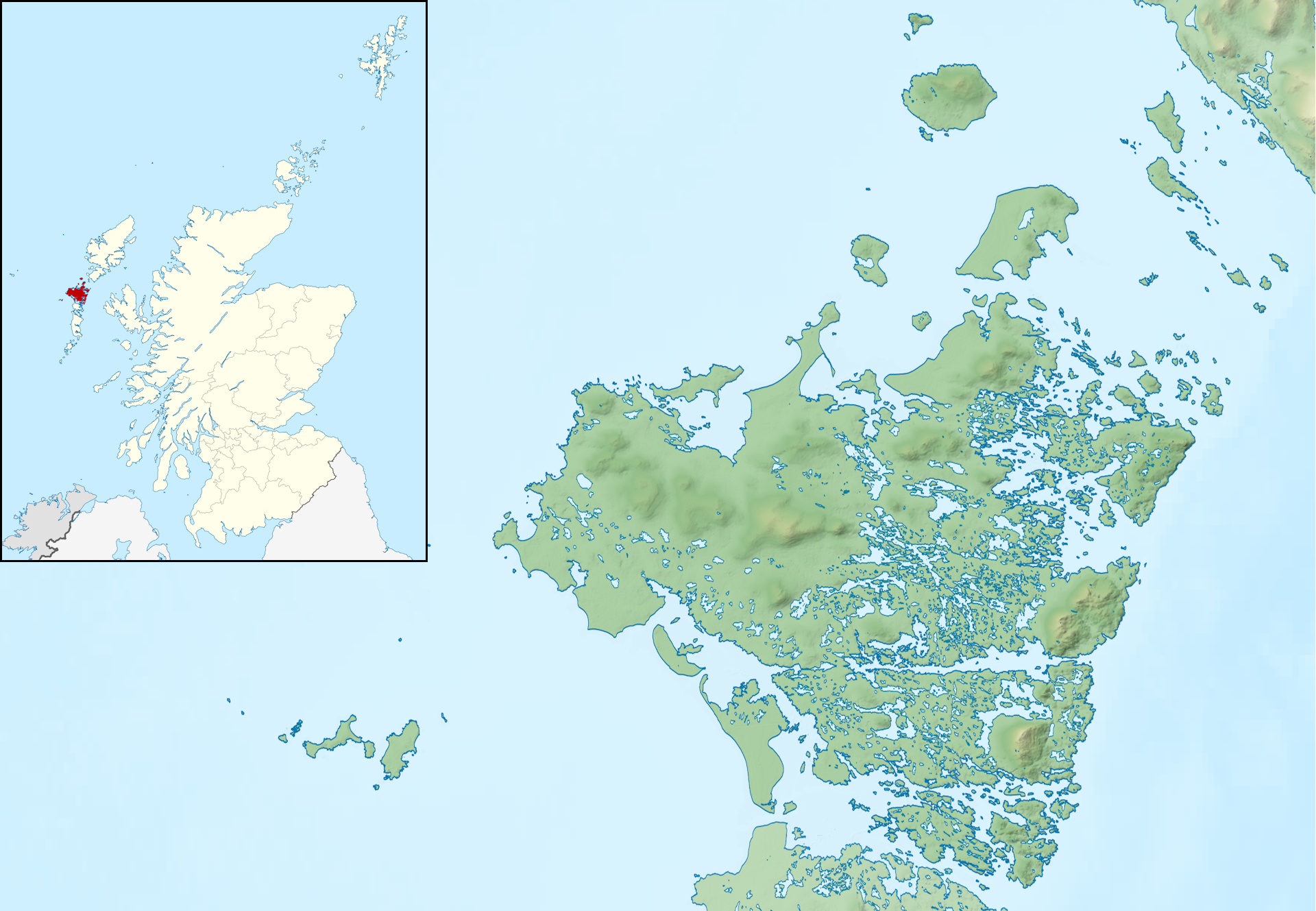
- Location within North Uist Location within Outer Hebrides
- OS grid reference: NF847583
- Coordinates: 57.505°N 7.266°W

Physical geography
- Island group: Uists and Barra
- Area: 7 ha (0 sq mi)
- Highest elevation: 10 m (33 ft)

Administration
- Council area: Na h-Eileanan Siar
- Country: Scotland
- Sovereign state: United Kingdom

Demographics
- Population: 1
- Population rank: 95=
- Population density: 14/km^{2} (36/sq mi)

Eilean a' Ghiorr is a bridged island that now forms part of the North Ford Causeway or Oitir Mór between North Uist and Benbecula in the Outer Hebrides of Scotland. In 2022 the census recorded a permanent population on the island of a single individual.

Along the main causeway to the north is the uninhabited islet of Garbh-eilean, which is in turn connected to the islet of Eilean Leathann by a small causeway that branches off the main road to the west. Heading south on the A865 the causeway leads to Grimsay.
