= Mary M. MacLean =

- Born: 3 June 1921; Cnoc Cuidhein
- Died: 2004
- Occupation: Poet
- Awards: The Bardic Crown

Mary Margaret MacLean (Gaelic: Màiri Mairead NicGhillEathain) (3 June 1921 – 2004) was a Scottish Gaelic language poet and author. She was the second woman to win the Bardic Crown awarded by An Comunn Gàidhealach at the Royal National Mòd.

Mary Margaret MacLean was born on 3 June 1921 in Cnoc Cuidhein on North Uist, the daughter of William Maclean, a grocer, and Catherine Cameron. In 1935, the family moved to Grimsay, where she would live most of the rest of her life. She was educated at Glaic Primary School and through correspondence courses. During World War II she worked in various secretarial positions throughout Scotland. In 1950 she returned to Grimsay to care for her grandmother.

In 1949, she was engaged to poet Donald John MacDonald of South Uist, who frequently travelled between the islands to visit her. She later broke off the engagement and joined the Free Church of Scotland. She later said "Marriage, in those days, was an absolute giving of one’s life and I, in all honesty, felt unable to give my life to a single man. I wanted to write great poetry ... I felt I had a vision of the world which I had a duty to express through my poetry."

Her first publication was a collection of English and Gaelic poetry, Sunbeams and Starlight (1947). She won the Bardic Crown with her poem "Do Bheinn Eubhal" ("To Ben Eaval"), about the highest point on North Uist. As the second woman to win the award, she received significant press attention. Her poem "Am Fear-Ciùil" won second prize that year in a poetry competition by the Scottish Committee of the Arts Council. She also recorded works for the BBC Radio program Sguel na h-Aon Oidhche.

Her later work includes the short story collection Lus-Chrin à Griomsaidh (1970) and the novella Gainmbheach an Fhàsaich (1971).

== Bibliography ==
- Sunbeams and Starlight. 1947.
- Lus-Chrin à Griomsaidh. Inverness: Club Leabhar, 1970.
- Gainmbheach an Fhàsaich. Inverness: Club Leabhar, 1971.
