= Benbecula =

Island of the Outer Hebrides, Scotland

Beinn nam Fadhla (Gaelic)
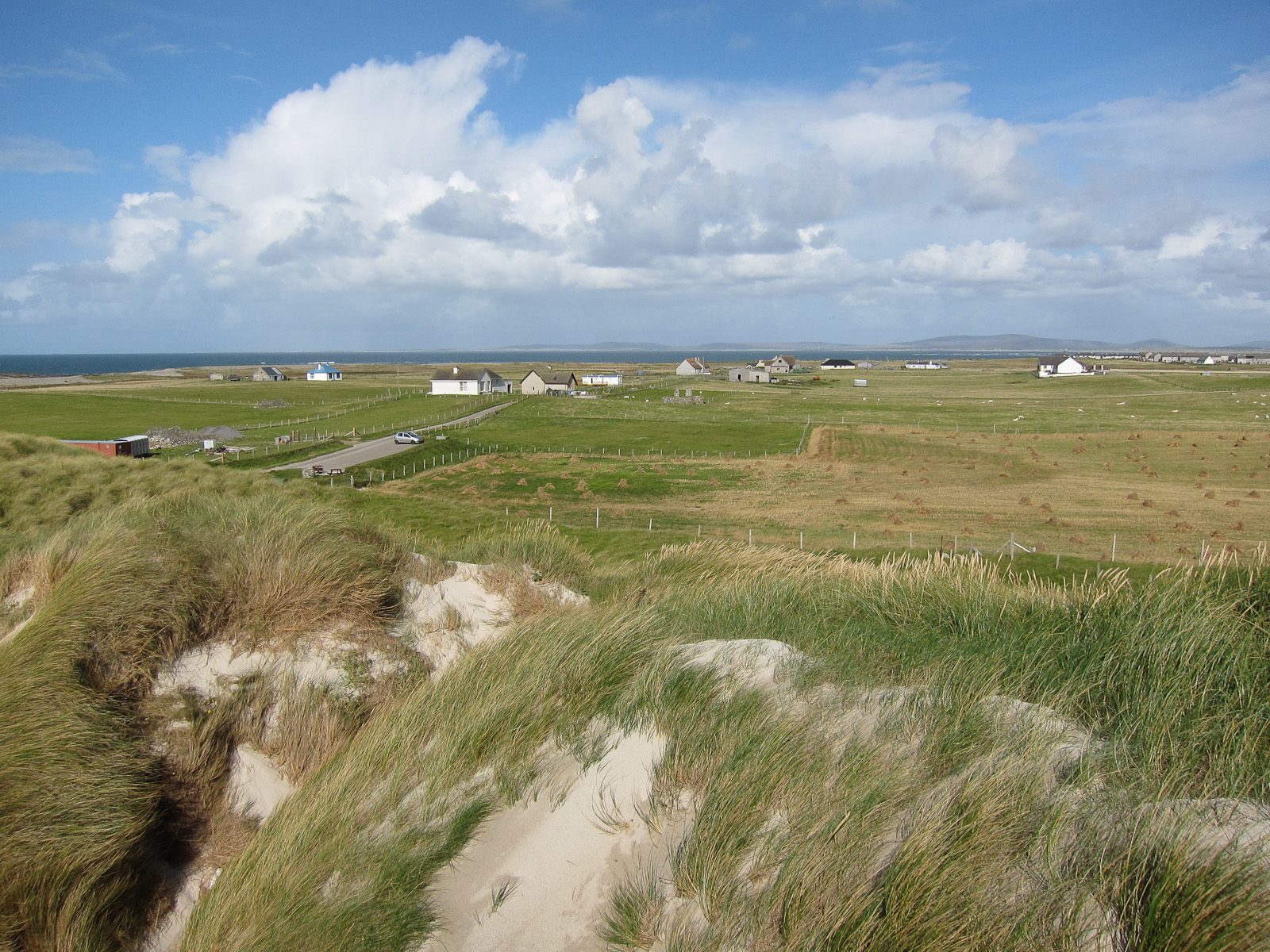

Location
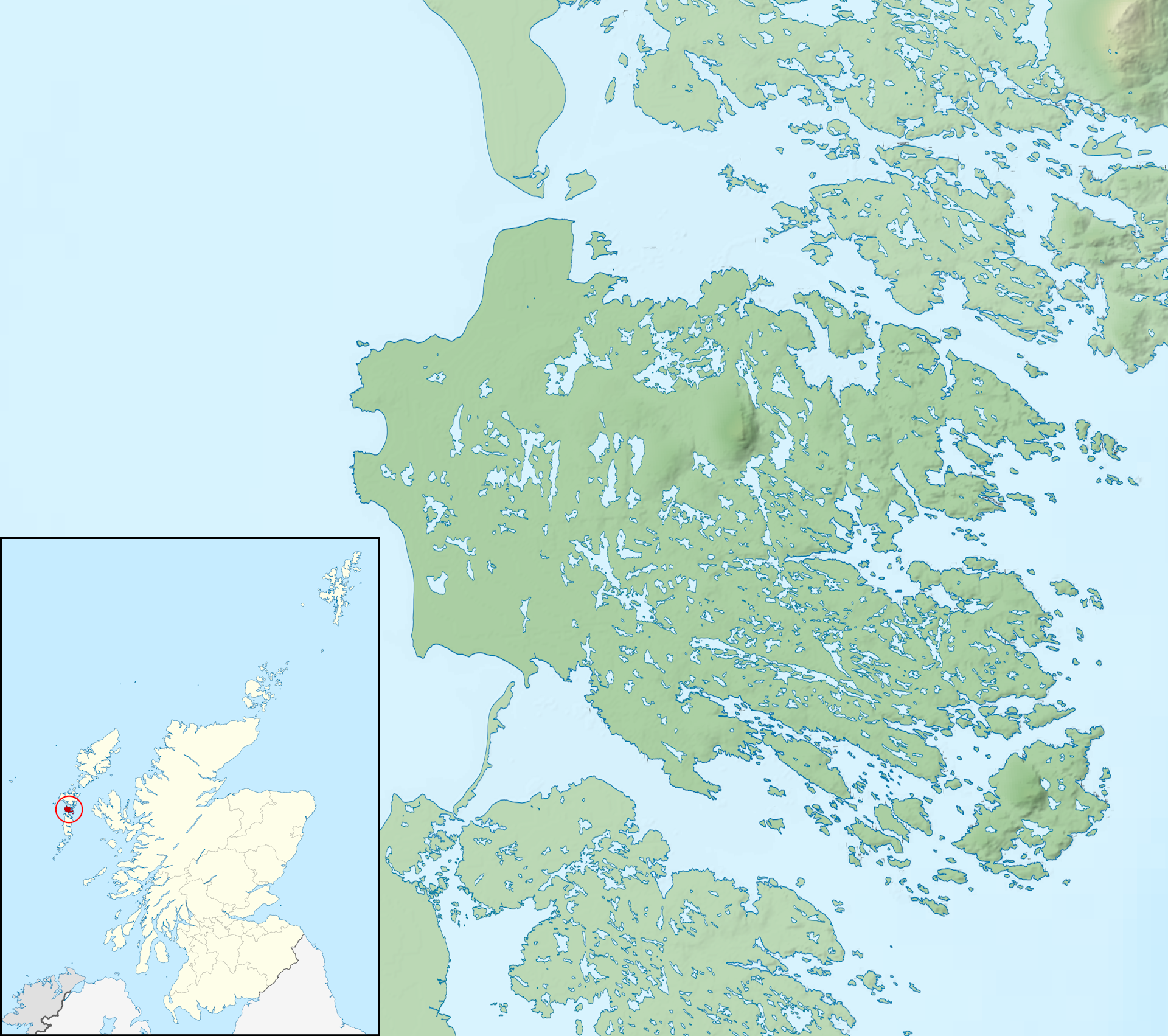
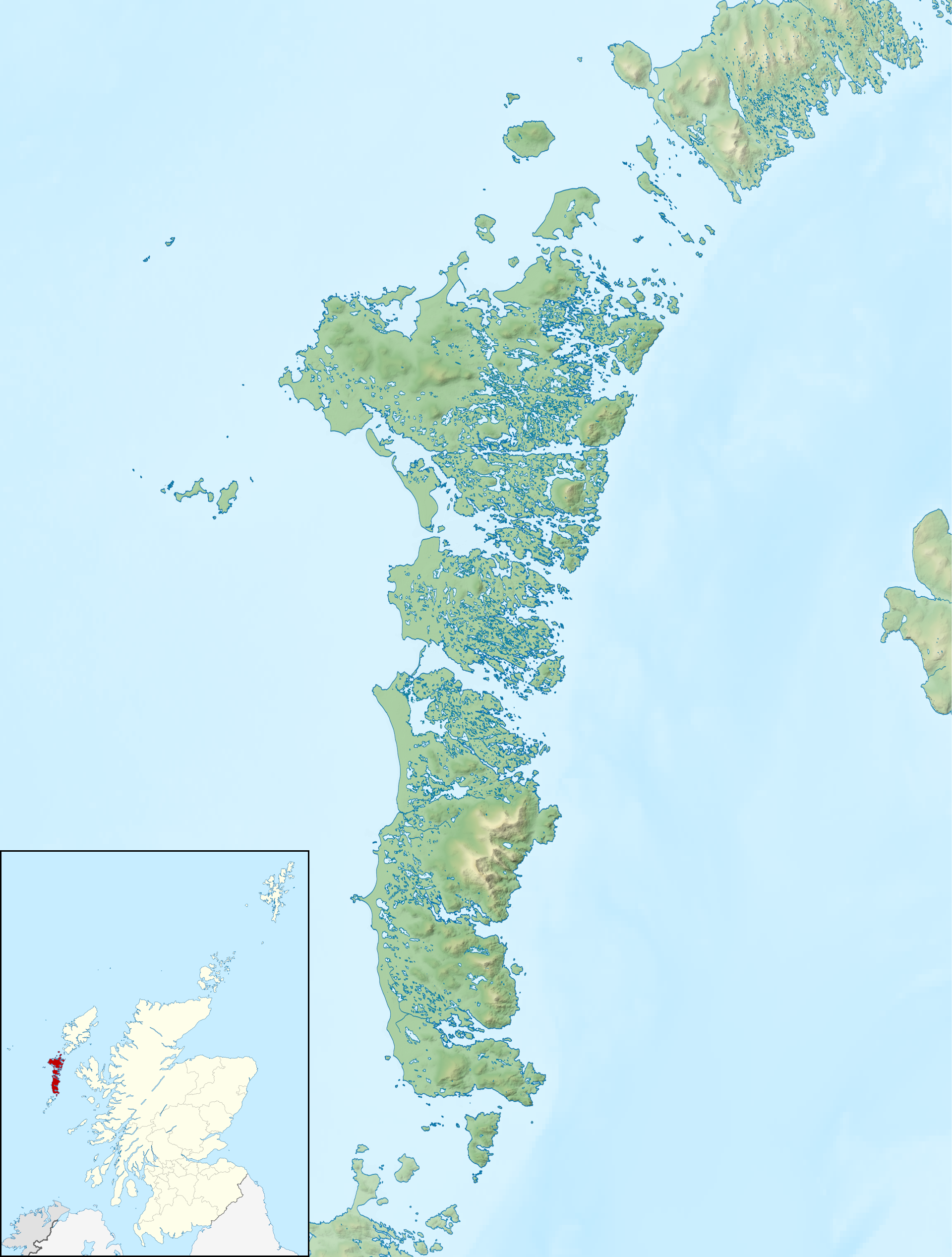
- Map of Benbecula & surrounding islands Benbecula shown within the Outer Hebrides Benbecula (Outer Hebrides)
- OS grid reference: NF807525
- Coordinates: 57.446°N 7.320°W

Name
- Gaelic pronunciation: [peɲəˈvɤːlˠ̪ə]
- Name meaning: hill of the fords

Physical geography
- Island group: Uist and Barra
- Area: 8,203 ha (31 5/8 sq mi)
- Area rank: 16
- Highest elevation: Ruabhal, 124 m (407 ft)

Administration
- Council area: Na h-Eileanan Siar
- Country: Scotland
- Sovereign state: United Kingdom

Demographics
- Population: 1,255
- Population rank: 11
- Population density: 15.3/km^{2} (40/sq mi)
- Largest settlement: Balivanich

The Isle of Benbecula (/bɛnˈbɛkjʊlə/ ben-BEK-yuul-ə; Scottish Gaelic: Beinn nam Fadhla or Beinn na Faoghla) is an island of the Outer Hebrides in the Atlantic Ocean off the west coast of Scotland. In the 2022 census it had a resident population of 1,255 including a sizable percentage of Roman Catholics. It is in a zone administered by Comhairle nan Eilean Siar or the Western Isles Council. The island is about 12 kilometres (7 miles) from west to east and a similar distance from north to south. It lies between the islands of North Uist and South Uist and is connected to both by road causeways. Benbecula's main settlement and administrative centre is Balivanich (Scottish Gaelic: Baile a' Mhanaich, meaning "Town of the Monk").

In 1746, Bonnie Prince Charlie was caught in a storm and forced to land on Benbecula. The population of Benbecula were sympathetic to the Jacobite cause, and smuggled him off the island to safety, as the song has it: "over the sea to Skye".

In 2006, local residents took control of parts of the island in a community buy-out. The previous landowners, a sporting syndicate, sold their 372-square-kilometre (92,000-acre) estate, which included the Isle of Benbecula, South Uist and Eriskay, for £4.5 million, to a community-owned organisation known as Stòras Uibhist, which now manages the land in perpetuity.

== Language ==
=== Etymology ===
The first written record of the name is as "Beanbeacla" in 1449. The names Beinn nam Fadhla and Beinn na Faoghla are used in Scottish Gaelic today. All these names are assumed to derive from Peighinn nam Fadhla (pronounced [pʰe.ɪɲəmˈfɤːlˠ̪ə]) "pennyland of the fords" as the island is low-lying.

The second element is a loan from Norse vaðil(l) "ford" which was borrowed as Gaelic fadhail (genitive fadhla). Through the process of reverse lenition fadhla, with the ethnonymic suffix -ach, has led to the formation of Badhlach "a person from Benbecula".

Other interpretations that have been suggested over the years are Beinn Bheag a' bhFaodhla, supposedly meaning the "little mountain of the ford", Beinn a' Bhuachaille, meaning "the herdsman's mountain" and from Beinnmhaol, meaning "bare hill".

The island is also known in Gaelic poetry as An t-Eilean Dorcha "the dark island".

=== Current language use ===
Benbecula has historically been a very strong Gaelic-speaking area. In both the 1901 and the 1921 censuses, all parishes were reported to be over 75% Gaelic-speaking. By 1971, Benbecula and South Uist were classed as 50–74% Gaelic-speaking.

It remains a relatively strong Gaelic-speaking area in spite of a continued decline. In the 2001 census, Benbecula overall had 56% Gaelic speakers. The weakest Gaelic-speaking area is Balivanich, with only 37%. All other areas on Benbecula range between 74% (Lionacleit) and 62% (Gramsdale and Uachdar).

== Geology ==
In common with the rest of the Western Isles, Benbecula is formed from the oldest rocks in Britain, the Lewisian gneiss which dates from the Archaean eon. Some around Ruabhal is described as Scourian gneiss of ortho-amphibolite composition. The direction of inclination of layered textures or foliation in this metamorphic rock varies across the island. Pseudotachylites are developed in certain areas whilst dykes and metasediments are noted at various localities. The island is traversed by numerous normal faults most of which run broadly NW-SE though others run NNW-SSE. The Outer Hebrides Thrust, a legacy of the Caledonian orogeny, lies just off the eastern coast of the island and is seen on neighbouring Wiay and Marigaidh. Recent geological deposits include blown sand which is found around Balivanich and the airport and peat which though widespread in pockets, is found in larger quantities in the centre of the island.

== Geography ==
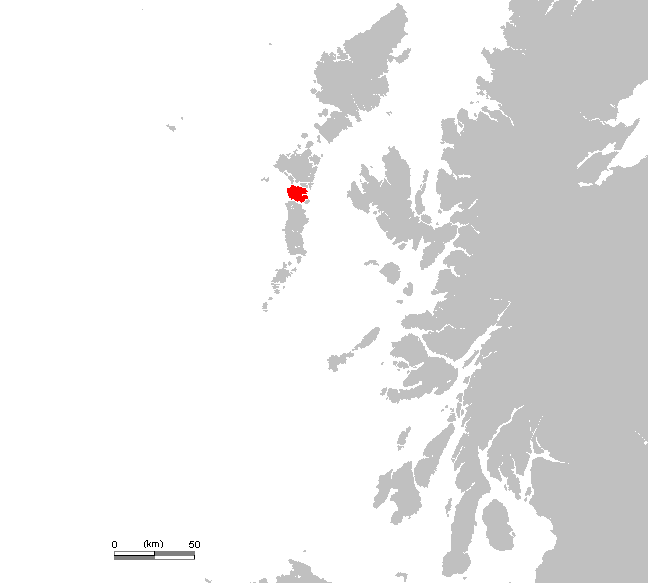

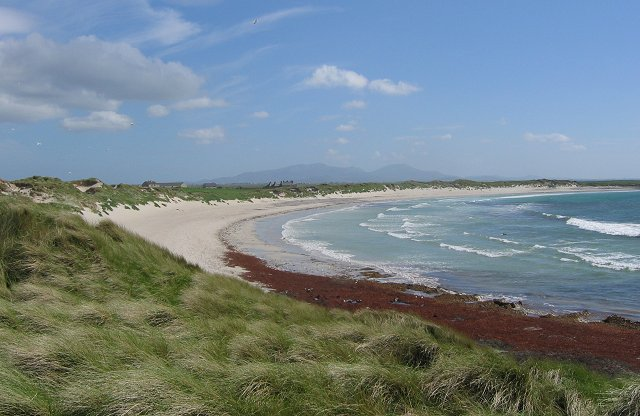
Beach (Cula Bay) on the west coast of Benbecula looking towards South Uist

The island is about 12 kilometres (7 miles) from west to east and a similar distance from north to south. It lies between the islands of North Uist and South Uist; it is connected to both by road causeways. Travel to any of the other Hebridean islands, or to the British mainland, is by air or sea. Benbecula Airport on the island has daily flights to Glasgow, Stornoway and Barra. A direct service to Inverness was introduced in 2006 but discontinued in May 2007. There are no direct ferry services from Benbecula to the mainland, but a service operated by Caledonian MacBrayne from Lochboisdale on South Uist provides a five-hour crossing to Oban on the mainland, whilst another service from Lochmaddy on North Uist provides a two-hour crossing to Uig on the Inner Hebridean island of Skye, and hence to the mainland via the Skye Bridge. Ferry services from the islands of Berneray (linked by causeway to North Uist) and Eriskay (linked to South Uist) connect to the other Outer Hebridean islands of Harris and Barra respectively.

There is a dense cluster of lochs across almost the entire island, and almost the whole island is below 20 metres (70 feet) in elevation.

=== Climate ===
Benbecula has an extremely moderated temperate oceanic climate (Köppen: Cfb ), due to its island location. The nearest station to Benbecula is now South Uist, 18 miles (29 kilometres) away. However, a long-standing weather station used to report directly from Benbecula, where the highest temperature ever reported in the Western Isles was recorded at 27 °C (81 °F) on 30 July 1948.

Climate data for South Uist Range, 1981–2010, elevation: 13 ft (4 m), 1981–2010 normals
Month	Jan	Feb	Mar	Apr	May	Jun	Jul	Aug	Sep	Oct	Nov	Dec	Year
Mean daily maximum °C (°F)	7.7 (45.9)	7.2 (45.0)	8.2 (46.8)	10.2 (50.4)	12.9 (55.2)	14.6 (58.3)	16.1 (61.0)	16.1 (61.0)	14.9 (58.8)	12.2 (54.0)	9.8 (49.6)	8.1 (46.6)	11.5 (52.7)
Daily mean °C (°F)	5.4 (41.7)	5.1 (41.2)	6.0 (42.8)	7.7 (45.9)	10.1 (50.2)	12.2 (54.0)	13.8 (56.8)	13.8 (56.8)	12.7 (54.9)	9.9 (49.8)	7.6 (45.7)	5.9 (42.6)	9.2 (48.6)
Mean daily minimum °C (°F)	3.1 (37.6)	3.0 (37.4)	3.8 (38.8)	5.1 (41.2)	7.4 (45.3)	9.7 (49.5)	11.4 (52.5)	11.5 (52.7)	10.4 (50.7)	7.8 (46.0)	5.3 (41.5)	3.6 (38.5)	6.9 (44.4)
Average precipitation mm (inches)	140.1 (5.52)	94.9 (3.74)	104.3 (4.11)	67.3 (2.65)	58.3 (2.30)	61.7 (2.43)	77.7 (3.06)	100.5 (3.96)	105.4 (4.15)	136.2 (5.36)	128.9 (5.07)	118.4 (4.66)	1,193.7 (47.01)
Average precipitation days (≥ 1.0 mm)	20.6	16.4	19.8	13.2	11.6	13.4	14.0	16.9	15.4	20.8	21.3	19.4	202.8
Source: Met Office

=== Settlements ===
Benbecula's main settlement is Balivanich (Scottish Gaelic: Baile a' Mhanaich, meaning "Town of the Monk") in the northwest. It is the main administrative centre for Benbecula, North Uist, South Uist and nearby islands, and has the council offices and the administrative centre for MOD Hebrides on South Uist, which is managed by QinetiQ. The village is also home to the airport and the island's bank.

Other settlements include Craigstrome, a tiny hamlet in the south-east of Benbecula. In contrast to the cultivated west coast of the island, the eastern half is a mixture of freshwater lochs, moorland, bog and deeply indenting sea lochs. Craigstrome is near Ruabhal, Benbecula's highest hill at 124 metres (407 ft).

The township of Lionacleit houses the island's main secondary school, which also doubles as a community centre, with a swimming pool, cafeteria, sports facilities, a small museum and a library. Next door to this is the Lionacleit campus of Lews Castle College. Lionacleit lies on the west coast road, about 1 mile (1.6 kilometres) from its junction with the north–south spinal road near Creagorry.

Creagorry is in the south of the island, near the causeway to South Uist. The Co-op here is the main supermarket for the south of the island and for the north of South Uist. Borve Castle is near Lionacleit.

The RAF radar station RRH Benbecula monitors the northern Atlantic, but is located on the west coast of North Uist.

=== Nearby islands ===
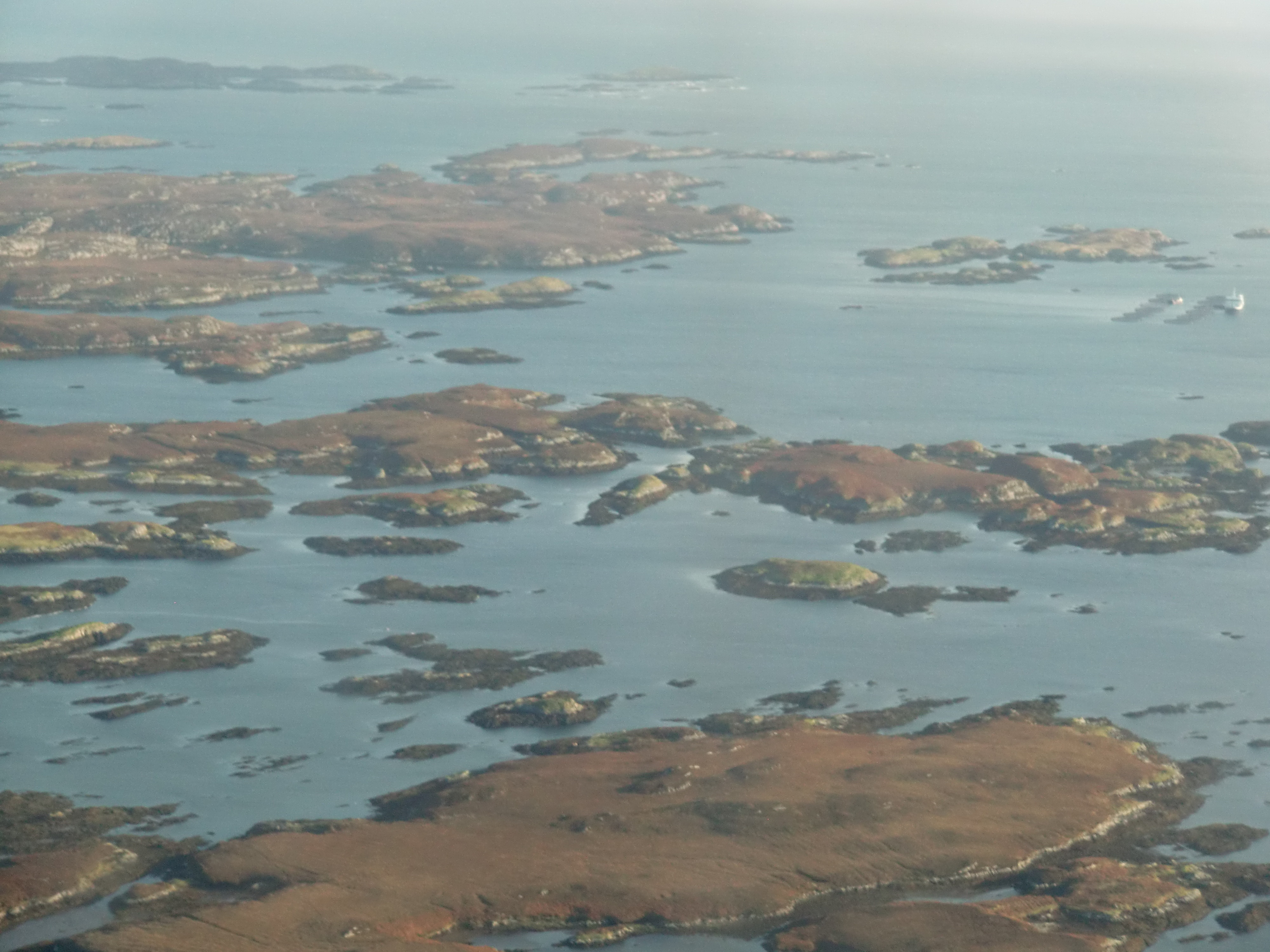
Islands in Loch Uisgebhagh. Bearran is at top right, Orasaigh, middle right and the peninsula of Meanais at top left.

In addition to South and North Uist, there are numerous islands off the north, east and south coasts. To the north of Balivanich is Baleshare, and further east is Flodaigh, which is connected to Benbecula by another causeway. Beyond Flodaigh are Grimsay and Ronay. Off the east coast there are numerous small islands in Loch Uisgebhagh and beyond, including Bearran and Orasaigh Uisgeabhagh. Eileanan Chearabhaigh in the south east have a total area of 100 hectares (250 acres) spread over several islands, the largest of which is about 31 hectares (77 acres) in extent. Further south is the larger Wiay and west from there a profusion of skerries and small islands lie to the north of Bagh nam Faoileann. These include Seana Bhaile, a second Grimsay, Fodragaigh, Eilean na Cille and Triallabreac.

== History ==
=== Early history ===
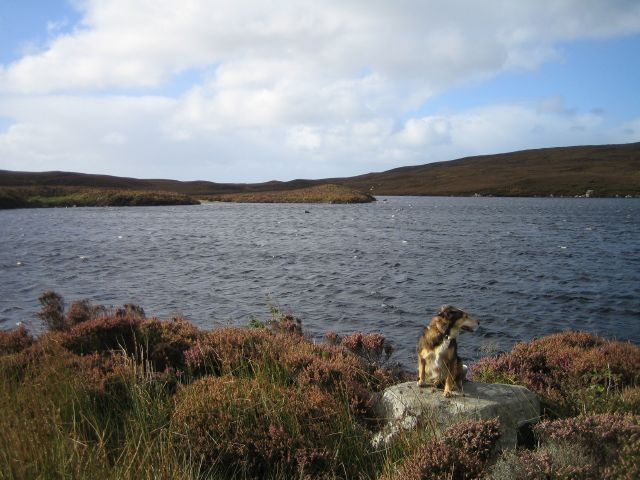
Loch Ba Una (Note: The chambered cairns are located beyond the Loch.)

A number of standing stones from the Neolithic period are scattered throughout the island, including the remains of a stone circle at Rubha Bhidein, adjacent to the traditional ford to Grimsay. (Note: The modern causeway lands adjacent to the ford) In addition to these, the remains of two chambered cairns lie between Loch Ba Una, and Loch nan Clachan. A Beaker site has been identified a Rossinish.

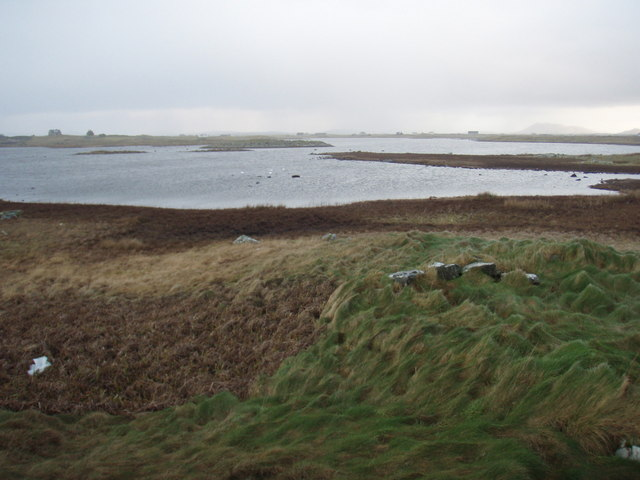
Loch Dùn Mhurchaidh; Dun Buidhe is on the larger island in the distance.

The island is rich in built remains from the Iron Age, though they are generally in poor condition. A number of small island forts can be found throughout Benbecula, particularly on Loch Olabhat, but the most substantial is Dun Buidhe, near Balivanich, which has a series of causeways linking it to the loch shore, via Eilean Dubh (Black Island); a wheelhouse was also present nearby (Note: The airport runway now lies on top of it) (a better preserved wheelhouse survives on the adjacent island of Grimsay), at which Iron Age pottery was found.

At the shore near Dun Buidhne was found a Class 1 Pictish symbol stone, inscribed with two basic symbols (Note: The stone is now located in the Edinburgh Museum of Scotland, (as seen here)) one of the only indications anywhere in the Outer Hebrides that Picts had been present. Traditional accounts claim that Ternan, an Irish missionary of the late 5th/early 6th century, established a chapel to the south of Dun Buidhe, from which he sought to convert the Picts to Christianity; Balivanich takes its name from this supposed establishment.

=== Kingdom ===
In the 9th century Viking settlers established the Kingdom of the Isles throughout the Hebrides. Nevertheless, although evidence of Viking settlement has been found in both North and South Uist, there has not yet been found any sign of Viking settlement on Benbecula itself. Following Norwegian unification, the Kingdom of the Isles became a crown dependency of the Norwegian king; to the Norwegians the Kingdom was Suðreyjar (meaning southern isles). Malcolm III of Scotland acknowledged in writing that Suðreyjar were not Scottish, and king Edgar quitclaimed any residual doubts.

However, in the mid 12th century, Somerled, a Norse-Gael of uncertain origin, launched a coup, which made Suðreyjar entirely independent. Following his death, Norwegian authority was nominally restored, but in practice the kingdom was divided between Somerled's heirs (Clann Somhairle), and the dynasty that Somerled had deposed (the Crovan dynasty). The MacRory, a branch of Somerled's heirs, ruled Benbecula, as well as Uist, Barra, Eigg, Rùm, the Rough Bounds, Bute, Arran, and northern Jura.

In the 13th century, despite Edgar's quitclaim, Scottish forces attempted to conquer parts of Suðreyjar, culminating in the indecisive Battle of Largs. In 1266, the matter was settled by the Treaty of Perth, which transferred the whole of Suðreyjar to Scotland, in exchange for a very large sum of money. (Note: 4000 marks) The treaty expressly preserved the status of the rulers of Suðreyjar; the MacRory lands, excepting Bute, Arran, and Jura, became the Lordship of Garmoran, a quasi-independent crown dependency, rather than an intrinsic part of Scotland.

=== Lordship ===
At the turn of the century, William I had created the position of Sheriff of Inverness, to be responsible for the Scottish highlands, which theoretically now extended to Garmoran. In 1293, however, king John Balliol established the Sheriffdom of Skye, which included the Outer Hebrides. Nevertheless, following his usurpation, the Skye sheriffdom ceased to be mentioned, (Note: in surviving records, at least) and the Garmoran lordship (including Uist) was confirmed to the MacRury leader. In 1343, King David II issued a further charter for this to the latter's son.

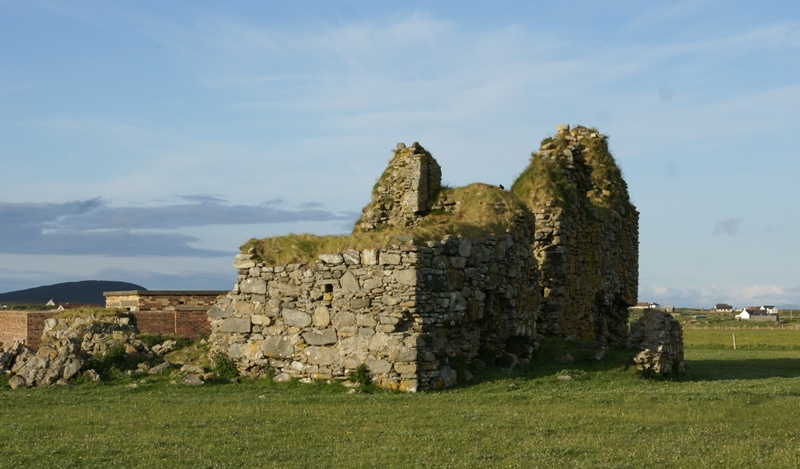
Ruins of Borve Castle, Benbecula

Just three years later (Note: 1346) the sole surviving MacRury heir was Amy of Garmoran. According to MacGibbon and Ross, Borve Castle (which they date to between 1344 and 1363) was built by Amy; it became the main power seat of power in Benbecula and surrounding islands of North and South Uist. Amy is also reported to have built the parish church of St. Columba on Benbecula; the eastern side of Teampul Chalumchille, an ancient chapel dedicated to St Columba, dates to her lifetime. (Note: Other parts are more recent)

The southern parts of the Kingdom of the Isles had become the Lordship of the Isles, ruled by the MacDonalds (another group of Somerled's descendants). Amy married the MacDonald leader, John of Islay, but a decade later he divorced her, and married the king's niece instead (in return for a substantial dowry). As part of the divorce, John deprived his eldest son, Ranald, of the ability to inherit the Lordship of the Isles, in favour of a son by his new wife. As compensation, John granted Lordship of North Uist and South Uist (presumably including Benbecula) to Ranald's younger brother Godfrey, and made Ranald Lord of the remainder of Garmoran.

However, on Ranald's death, his sons were still children, and Godfrey took the opportunity to seize the Lordship of Garmoran. This led to a great deal of violent conflict involving Godfrey's family (the Siol Gorrie) and the heirs of Ranald (Clan Ranald) and his other brother Murdoch (the Siol Murdoch). (Note: Surviving records do not describe this in detail) In 1427, frustrated with the level of violence generally in the highlands, King James I demanded that highland magnates should attend a meeting at Inverness. On arrival, many of the leaders were seized and imprisoned. Alexander MacGorrie, son of Godfrey, was considered to be one of the two most reprehensible, and after a quick showtrial, was immediately executed. As Alexander had by now inherited Godfrey's de facto position as Lord of Garmoran, and in view of Ranald's heirs being no less responsible for the violence, King James declared the Lordship forfeit.

=== Lairdship ===
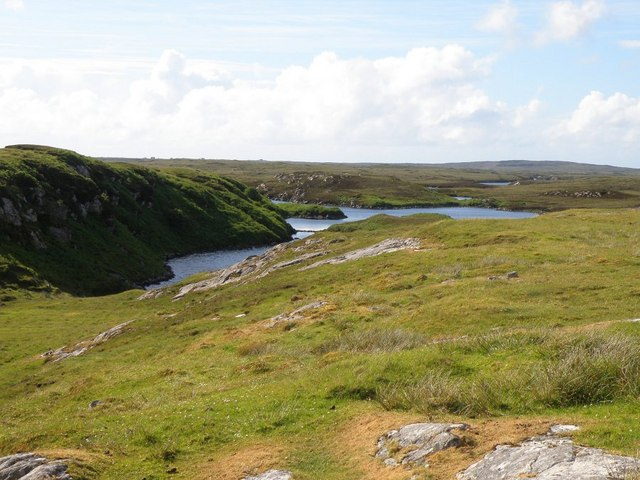
View over Loch Langabhat

Following the forfeiture, most of Garmoran (including Benbecula) remained with the Scottish crown until 1469, when James III granted Lairdship of it to John of Ross, the Lord of the Isles. In turn, John passed it to his own half-brother, Hugh of Sleat; the grant to Hugh was confirmed by the king – James IV – in a 1493 charter.

Hugh died a few years later, in 1498, and for reasons that are not remotely clear, his son John of Sleat immediately resigned, transferring all authority to the king. That same year, king James IV awarded Benbecula to Angus Reochson, son of Ranald's penultimate son, Angus Riabhach. (Note: Gaelic for freckled. It was pronounced somewhat like the English Reohh, hence Reochson for his son) Angus' son, Angus MacAngus Rewing, (Note: meaning son of Angus Reoh-on (ie. of Angus Reochson)) became a friar at Iona, and was succeeded by his son John. (Note: As a friar, Angus was legally unable to own land; he did not die until 1540, two years after his son) John died in 1538, without any lawful children; under the charter, this demise of Angus Riabhach's line (Note: gaelic:Silocht Aonghais Ruabhaig) meant that ownership of Benbecula returned to the King.

In 1538, therefore, the king granted lairdship of Benbecula to Allan and Lachlan MacDonald (jointly), the grandsons of Ranald Bane. Ordinarily, Allan would have been the head of Clan Ranald, but the extreme cruelty of his father, (Note: which records do not report in detail) Dougall, led to Ranald Bane's descendants being officially barred from the succession; instead leadership of the Clan now rested with Ranald Bane's nephew, John Moidartach. (Note: Moidartach refers to Moidart)

In 1549, Donald Monro, Dean of the Isles wrote of the "south part of Ywst" and went on:

and in the north syde of this there is ane parochin callit Buchagla, (Note: "Buchagla" is a reference to Benbecula and Beandmoyll, Beanweall, and Benvalgha are other variants found in charters.) perteining to the said Clandonald. At the north end thereof the sea cuts the countrey againe, and that cutting of the sea is called Careynesse, and benorth this countrey is called Kenehnache of Ywst, that is in Englishe, the north head of Ywst.

=== Tenancy ===
In 1596, concerned by the active involvement of Highland leaders in Irish rebellions against Queen Elizabeth of England, King James VI of Scotland (Elizabeth's heir) demanded that Highland leaders send well-armed men, as well as attending themselves, to meet him at Dumbarton on 1 August, and produce the charters for their land. As Allan's heirs did not do so, Benbecula became forfeit, by Act of Parliament. The king then awarded Benbecula to Donald Gorm Mor, the heir of Hugh of Sleat, as a reward for being one of the few Highland leaders who had obeyed the king's summons.

Donald Gorm Mor subinfeudated Benbecula to Clan Ranald for £46 per annum. In 1622, however, his successor, Donald Gorm Og, (Note: Og means "the younger") is found requesting that the Privy Council physically punish the Clan Ranald leadership for not removing their families and tenants from Benbecula; presumably they had not been paying the rent.

In 1633, Donald Gorm Og decided to sell the lairdship of Benbecula to the Earl of Argyll; (Note: for 26,921 marks, 10 shillings, and 8 pence) in January 1634, this arrangement was confirmed by a Crown charter. In 1661, as a leading opponent of king Charles I, the Earl's son – the Marquess of Argyll – was convicted of high treason, and his lands became forfeit. Thus, in 1673, it was the king demanding that Clan Ranald pay their outstanding rent for Benbecula.

=== Refuge ===
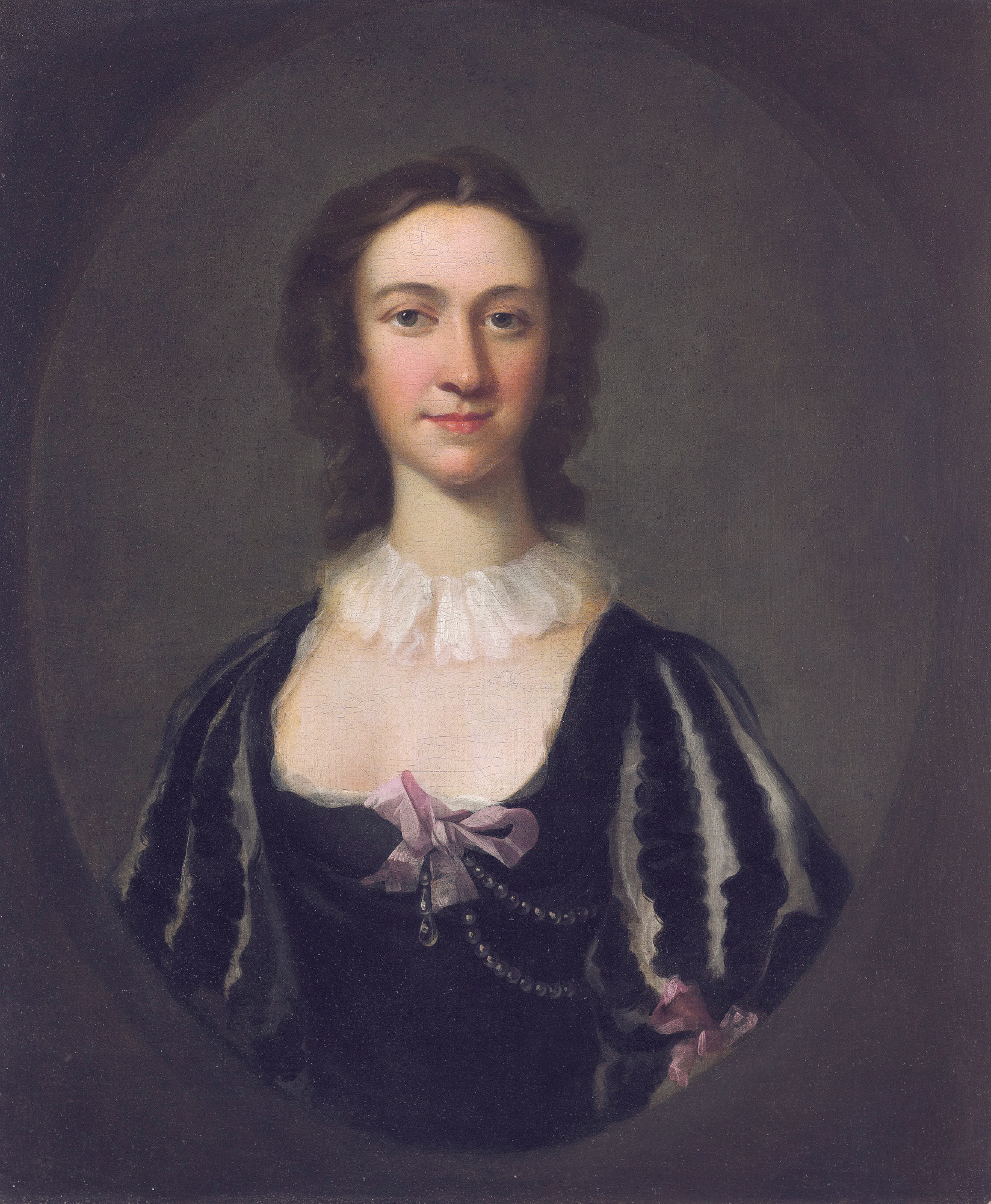
Flora MacDonald in 1747

In 1746 Flora MacDonald was visiting Benbecula, then controlled by a Hanoverian-supporting militia, an Independent Highland Company commanded by her step-father, Hugh MacDonald. She was additionally a distant relative of two of the companions of Bonnie Prince Charlie (Prince Charles Edward Stuart), who had recently fled in the aftermath of the Battle of Culloden. During his voyage, the Prince's boat was caught in a storm, and he was forced to land on Benbecula.

Despite mainly being Presbyterian, Flora and the population of Benbecula were sympathetic to the Jacobite cause, and the Prince and his companions received hospitable treatment. Nevertheless, the Prince was a fugitive with a price on his head, (Note: £30,000) and his companions therefore sought out Flora whose connection to the militia would allow her access to the permits necessary for the Prince’s party to leave the island. She disguised him as an Irish spinning maid, Betty Burke, smuggled him off the island, on 27 June, and took him "over the sea to Skye". (Note: hence, The Skye Boat Song) Flora was arrested upon her return to Scotland, but was released following the Indemnity Act 1747. Later, she explained in person to the King's son, Prince Frederick, (Note: father of George III) that she had only acted out of charity, and would have done the same for either side.

=== Eviction ===
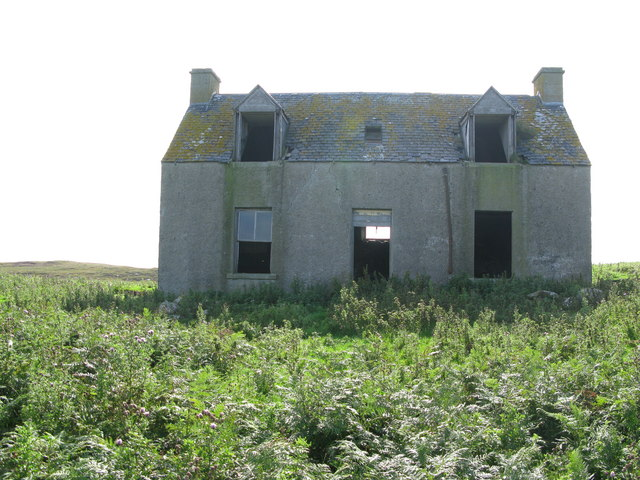
Abandoned house on Benbecula

In the early 19th century, the leader of Clan Ranald, Ranald George MacDonald, got into severe financial difficulties. The family trust forbade him from even visiting Benbecula. His difficulties were compounded by the enormous debts which had been amassed by his grandfather, in support of Jacobite armies. (Note: Although an act of attainder was passed against his grandfather, it had no consequences for him or his estates, due to accidentally referring to him as Donald rather than as Ranald, his actual name) In 1838, forced to sell his lands, Ranald sold them to Colonel John Gordon of Cluny.

Already accustomed to treating people as slaves, and seeing the financial advantages to livestock farming, Gordon was ruthless, evicting the population with short notice, sometimes even resorting to dragging them to the shore in handcuffs, wearing little more than their undergarments. He replaced the residents with sheep. Despite his behaviour causing a national outcry, it was continued by the widow of his son, well into the early 20th century. (Note: Following her second marriage, she became better known as Lady Emily Gordon Cathcart)

== Modern island life ==
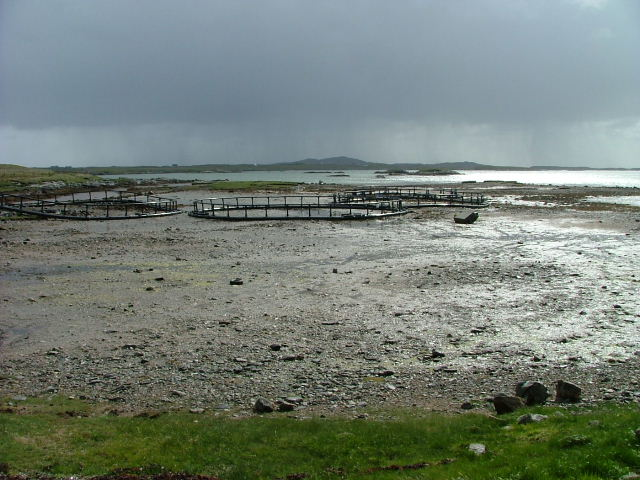
Fish cages

- In 2001 the census recorded a population of 1,219
- The 2011 total was 1,303, an increase of 7% against an average of 3% for all Scottish islands.
- By 2022 the population was 1,255.

A contributor to the economy is RRH Benbecula. The site near Balvanich also includes Benbecula Airport, with regular flights to Glasgow, Barra, and Stornoway.

Benbecula Distillery is a Scotch whisky distillery at Gramsdale on Benbecula. Developed in a converted salmon-processing facility, the site began producing spirit in June 2024 and features a distinctive glass, lighthouse-style stillhouse.

=== Community buy-out ===
After a protracted campaign, local residents took control of parts of the island on 30 November 2006 in a community buy-out. The previous landowners, a sporting syndicate, sold the assets of the 372-square-kilometre (92,000-acre) estate including Benbecula, South Uist and Eriskay for £4.5 million to a community-owned organisation known as Stòras Uibhist which was set up to purchase the land and to manage it in perpetuity.

== Mythology ==
A local myth states that a mermaid, discovered in 1830, is buried near the sea on Benbecula.

== See also ==
- List of islands of Scotland

== Bibliography ==
- Gregory, Donald (1881) The History of the Western Highlands and Isles of Scotland 1493–1625. Edinburgh. Birlinn. 2008 reprint – originally published by Thomas D. Morrison. ISBN 1-904607-57-8
- Haswell-Smith, Hamish (2004). The Scottish Islands. Edinburgh: Canongate. ISBN 978-1-84195-454-7.
- Monro, Sir Donald (1549) Description of the Western Isles of Scotland. William Auld. Edinburgh - 1774 edition.
