= Eilean Fraoch =

This is a list of islands called Eilean Fraoch or Fraoch Eilean, which provides an index for islands in Scotland with this and similar names. Literally meaning "heather island" in Scottish Gaelic, it is a common Scottish island name. It may also represent the forename "Fraoch" from Gaelic mythology.

"Eilean Fraoch" is also a nickname for the Isle of Lewis in the Outer Hebrides and "Fraoch Eilean" was the war-cry of Clan MacNaughton. The coat of arms of the current chief of Clan Donald includes the motto "Fraoch Eilean" which is set "on a compartment of rocks and heather proper issuant from the waves".

Fraoch Eilean has the same meaning in English as Linga or Lingay, island names of Norse derivation, also commonly found in Scotland.

== Eilean Fraoch ==
- Eilean Fraoch on Loch Avich
- Eilean Fraoich, Burnt Islands
- Eilean Fraoch, in Fionn Loch in Wester Ross

== Fraoch Eilean ==
- Fraoch Eilean, Loch Awe
- Fraoch Eilean, Loch Lomond near Luss
- Am Fraoch Eilean, or Fraoch Eilean off Jura, the location of Claig Castle
- The name of two islets off Luing
- Fraoch-eilean, an uninhabited tidal island off Seana Bhaile at grid reference NF860580.
- Am Fraoch-eilean, an uninhabited rocky islet at the mouth of Loch nan Ceall (grid reference NM614854) near Arisaig.

== Other uses ==
- "Fraoch Eilean" is the name of a reel played on the bagpipes.
