= Seana Bhaile =

Island in the Outer Hebrides, Scotland

Seana Bhaile (Gaelic)
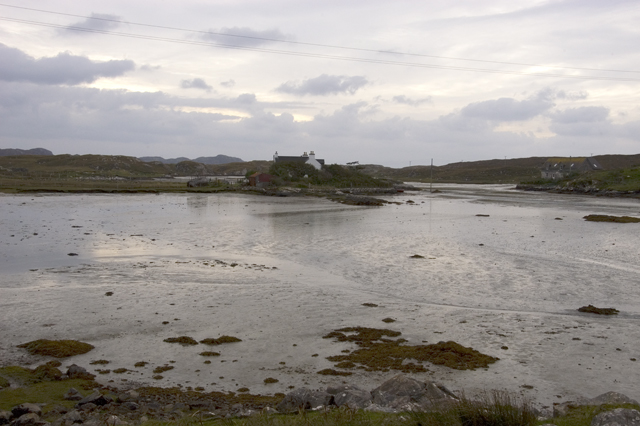

Location
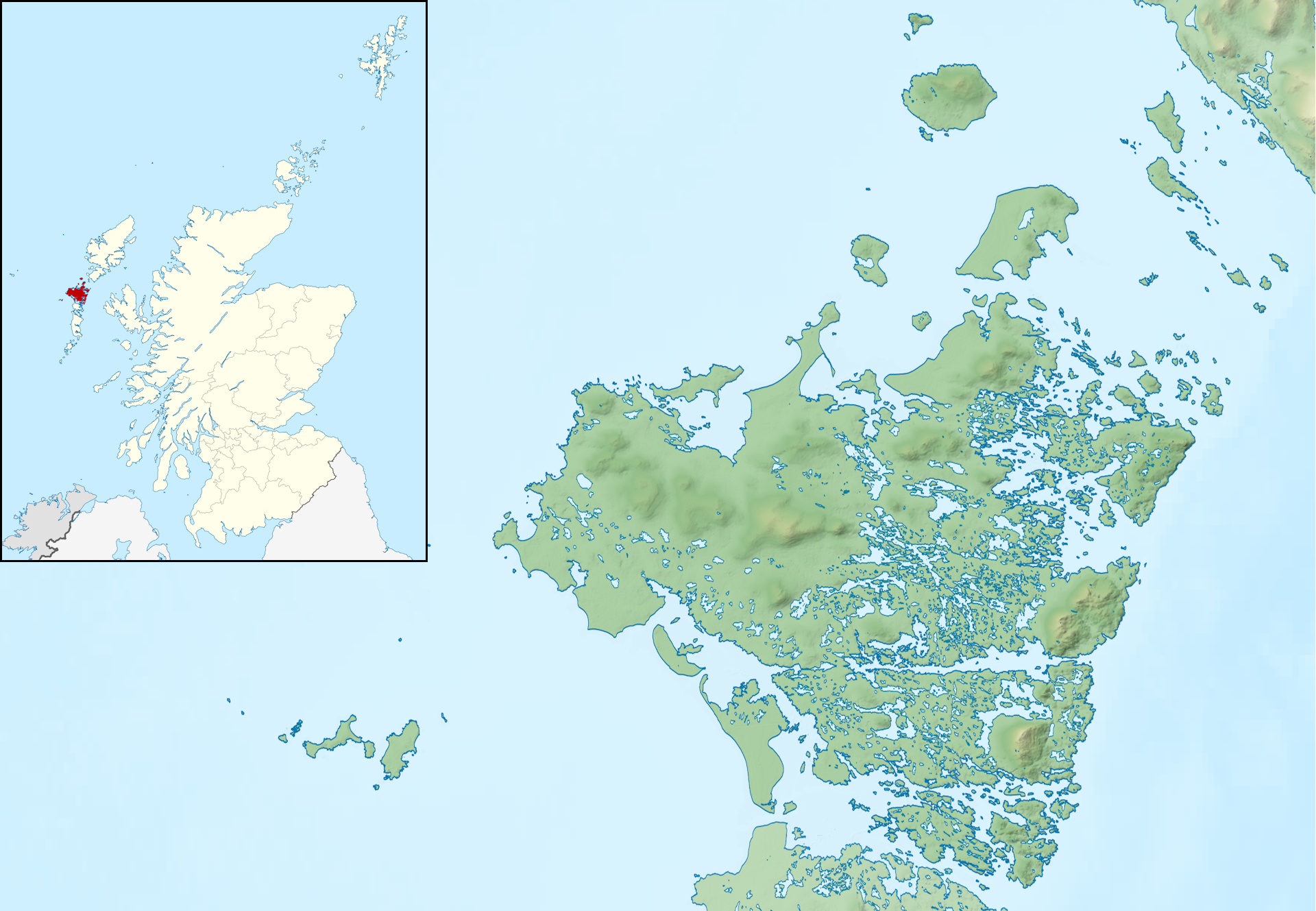
- Location within North Uist Location within Outer Hebrides
- OS grid reference: NF858581
- Coordinates: 57.504°N 7.248°W

Name
- Name meaning: "old township"

Physical geography
- Island group: Uists and Barra
- Area: 55 ha
- Area rank: 189=
- Highest elevation: Cnoc Mòr, 11 m (36 ft)

Administration
- Council area: Na h-Eileanan Siar
- Country: Scotland
- Sovereign state: United Kingdom

Demographics
- Population: 15
- Population rank: 66
- Population density: 30/km^{2} (78/sq mi)

Seana Bhaile is a small inhabited island north of Benbecula in the Outer Hebrides of Scotland. It is about 55 hectares (140 acres) in extent and the highest point is 11 metres (36 ft).

== Name ==
There has been some confusion about the name of the island. For example, the 2022 census 'release note' for Scottish islands states "We have been made aware of an incorrect name of an island on our Island map. Island code 177; Fraoch-eilean; Corrected – Seana Bhaile."

Fraoch-eilean means "heather island" in Scottish Gaelic and there are several other islands in Scotland with similar names.

Seana Bhaile means "old township" and similarly it is a name used elsewhere in the Gàidhealtachd.

19th and early 20th century Ordnance Survey maps seemingly show the island name as Seanabaily. In the modern Ordnance Survey maps at 1:50,000 the name Seana Bhaile is used but it is not clear if this is a settlement or an island name. At 1:25,000 The OS show both names with Seana Bhaile being written in larger letters than Fraoch-eilean, although the latter is a more likely name for an island. There is however some precedent for the former. Baleshare is an island to the northwest. The name means "east town". The "west town" may have been on land that was said to exist to the west that was washed away in the sixteenth century.

OpenSeaMap show the island name as Fraoch-eilean with Seana Bhaile being identified as a small settlement on the north coast.

It seems clear from the older maps and satellite imagery that Fraoch-eilean is the name of an abandoned farm or small settlement on an elevation in the south east of the island of Seana Bhaile which is largely surrounded by tidal waters to the south and salt marsh to the north. Neither Fraoch-eilean nor Seana Bhaile are listed by Haswell-Smith (2004).

== Geography ==
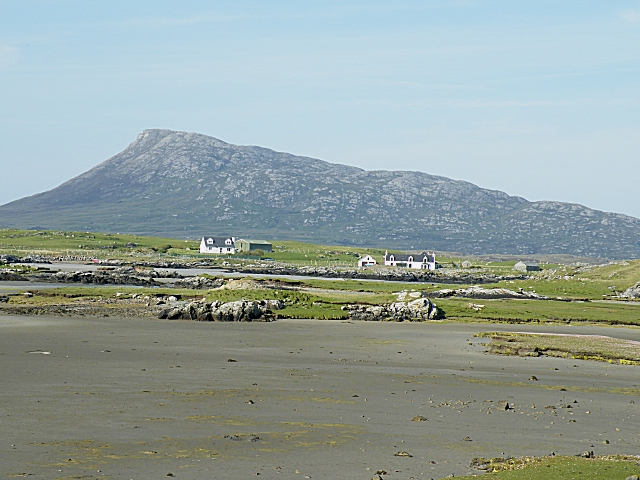
Houses on Seana Bhaile with Eabhal (Eaval), North Uist, in the background

The island is connected to Grimsay by a causeway. North Uist is to the north and the North Ford causeway to the west. The small islets of Eilean Roinoch and Màs Grimsay lie just offshore to the east and Eilean a' Ghiorr on the Oitir Mor causeway is to the west.

== Population ==
The island was not listed in either the 2001 census as being inhabited, or in the 2011 census although it is clear from both maps and photographic evidence that there was a resident population. The problems of defining islands in this part of the Hebrides are considerable (Note: For example, Haswell-Smith (2004) treats Eileanan Iasgaich (grid reference NF785186) as a single island of 50 ha, although during some high tides it becomes several tidal islets - none of which are ever connected to the "mainland" of South Uist.) and at that time it is likely that the population was recorded as being part of Grimsay itself, which has a population of 169 in 2011. (Note: In 2001 the General Register Office for Scotland defined an island as "a mass of land surrounded by water, separate from the Scottish mainland" and although the inclusion of islands linked by bridges etc. is not clear from this definition in practice they list several. There are however several smaller bridged islands that are likely to be inhabited from time to time they did not provide a population statistic for - see this list.) (Note: In 2022 Grimsay's population had declined by 20 to 149.) Ordnance Survey maps indicate a total of about a dozen buildings.

In 2022 the census recorded a population for the island of 15 under the name "Seana Bhaile".
