= Balivanich =

Coordinates: 57.473°N 7.378°W

Balivanich: Scottish Gaelic: Baile a' Mhanaich
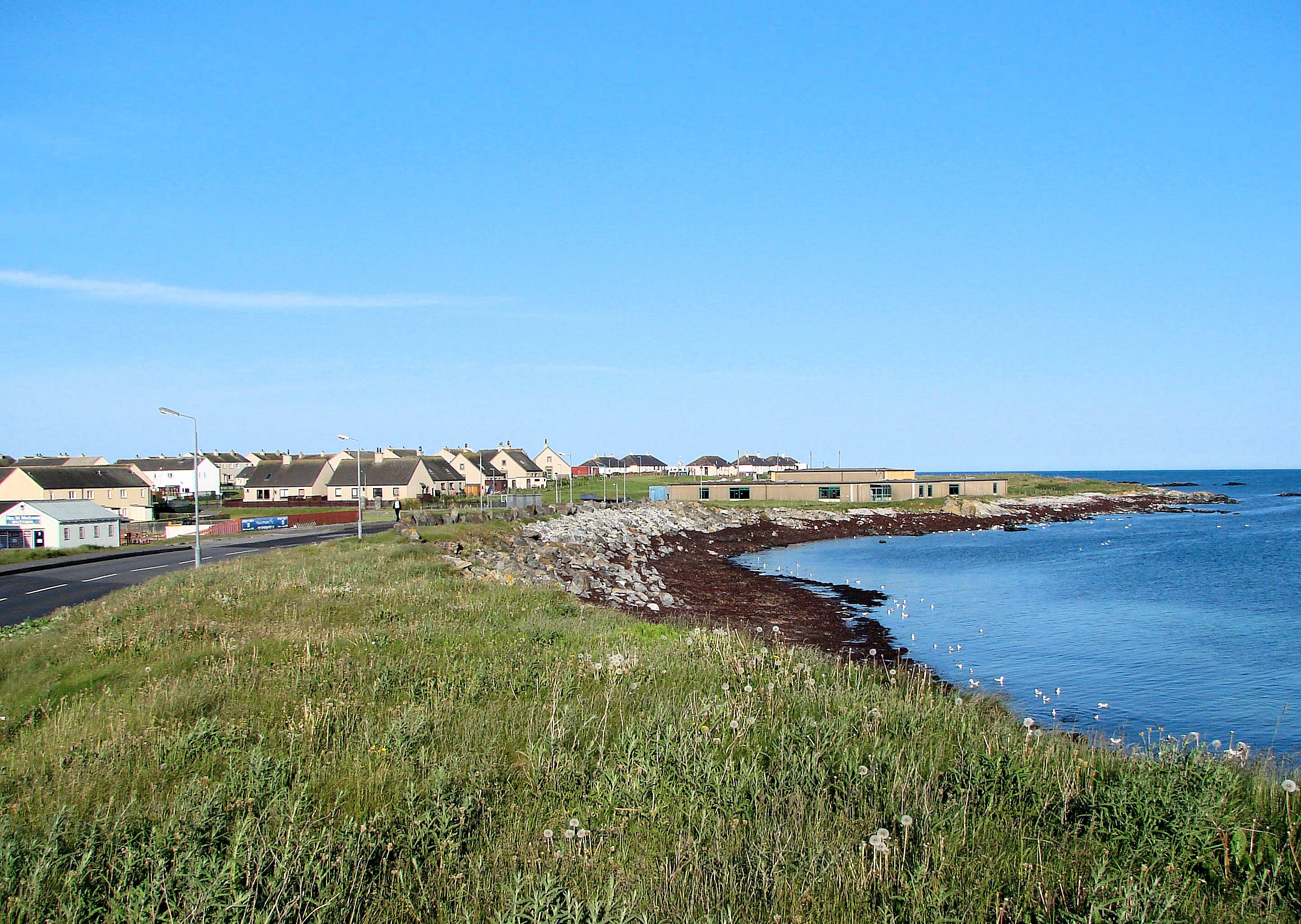
- Western part of Balivanich with former primary school

- Location within the Outer Hebrides
- Population: 510 (2020)
- Language: Scottish Gaelic; English
- OS grid reference: NF776552
- Civil parish: South Uist
- Council area: Na h-Eileanan Siar
- Lieutenancy area: Western Isles
- Country: Scotland
- Sovereign state: United Kingdom
- Post town: ISLE OF BENBECULA
- Postcode district: HS7
- Dialling code: 01870
- Police: Scotland
- Fire: Scottish
- Ambulance: Scottish
- UK Parliament: Na h-Eileanan an Iar
- Scottish Parliament: Na h-Eileanan an Iar

Balivanich (Scottish Gaelic: Baile a' Mhanaich [palə ˈvanɪç]) is a village on the island of Benbecula in the Outer Hebrides off the west coast of Scotland. It is the main centre for Benbecula and the adjacent islands of North Uist, South Uist and several smaller islands. Balivanich is within the parish of South Uist.

== History ==
The name meaning "town of the monk" possibly relates to a monastery which may have been founded here as early as during the 6th century. Teampull Chaluim Chille, an ancient church dedicated to Columba, might have been part of this monastery; its remains can still be seen south of the village. An airfield to the north, built during World War II, became the control centre for the Hebrides rocket range, established in 1957 at the height of the Cold War. It is now Benbecula Airport.

== Geography ==
Balivanich is located on the north-west coast of Benbecula in a largely flat area (0 to 10 metres or 0 to 33 feet above sea level). As of the date of the census on 29 April 2001, the village comprised 3.76 km^{2} (1 7/16 sq mi).

=== Climate ===
A weather station has collected climate data for the island a short distance northeast at Benbecula airport. As with the rest of the British Isles and Scotland, Balivanich experiences a maritime climate with cool summers and mild winters, and is particularly windy due to its position directly facing the North Atlantic.

Climate data for Benbecula 6m asl, 1971-2000, Rainfall 1951-1980 (Weather station 1 mi or 1.5 km north of Balivanich)
Month	Jan	Feb	Mar	Apr	May	Jun	Jul	Aug	Sep	Oct	Nov	Dec	Year
Mean daily maximum °C (°F)	7.2 (45.0)	7.3 (45.1)	8.3 (46.9)	10.0 (50.0)	12.9 (55.2)	14.5 (58.1)	16.1 (61.0)	16.2 (61.2)	14.4 (57.9)	12.0 (53.6)	9.2 (48.6)	7.8 (46.0)	11.3 (52.4)
Mean daily minimum °C (°F)	2.5 (36.5)	2.4 (36.3)	3.1 (37.6)	4.3 (39.7)	6.6 (43.9)	8.9 (48.0)	11.1 (52.0)	11.0 (51.8)	9.2 (48.6)	7.3 (45.1)	4.6 (40.3)	3.2 (37.8)	6.2 (43.1)
Average precipitation mm (inches)	129 (5.1)	86 (3.4)	89 (3.5)	62 (2.4)	65 (2.6)	76 (3.0)	83 (3.3)	83 (3.3)	119 (4.7)	139 (5.5)	140 (5.5)	132 (5.2)	1,203 (47.4)
Mean monthly sunshine hours	40.3	70.6	114.7	174.0	201.5	195.0	142.6	151.9	114.0	77.5	48.0	27.9	1,361
Source 1: YR.NO
Source 2: ScotClim

== Economy ==
The local council (Comhairle nan Eilean Siar) has offices in Balivanich, and there is also a post office, hospital, primary school and several shops and cafés.

== Transport ==
=== Road ===
Balivanich is on the B892 and is connected to the north–south main road, which is the A865. This connects North Uist, Benbecula and South Uist. The village is served by the bus route W17, which operates between Berneray in the north and Eriskay in the south. This service is provided by the local government for the Western Isles (Comhairle nan Eilean Siar) in collaboration with local bus companies and the PostBus service. The buses are regular, but not frequent, due to the low number of inhabitants.

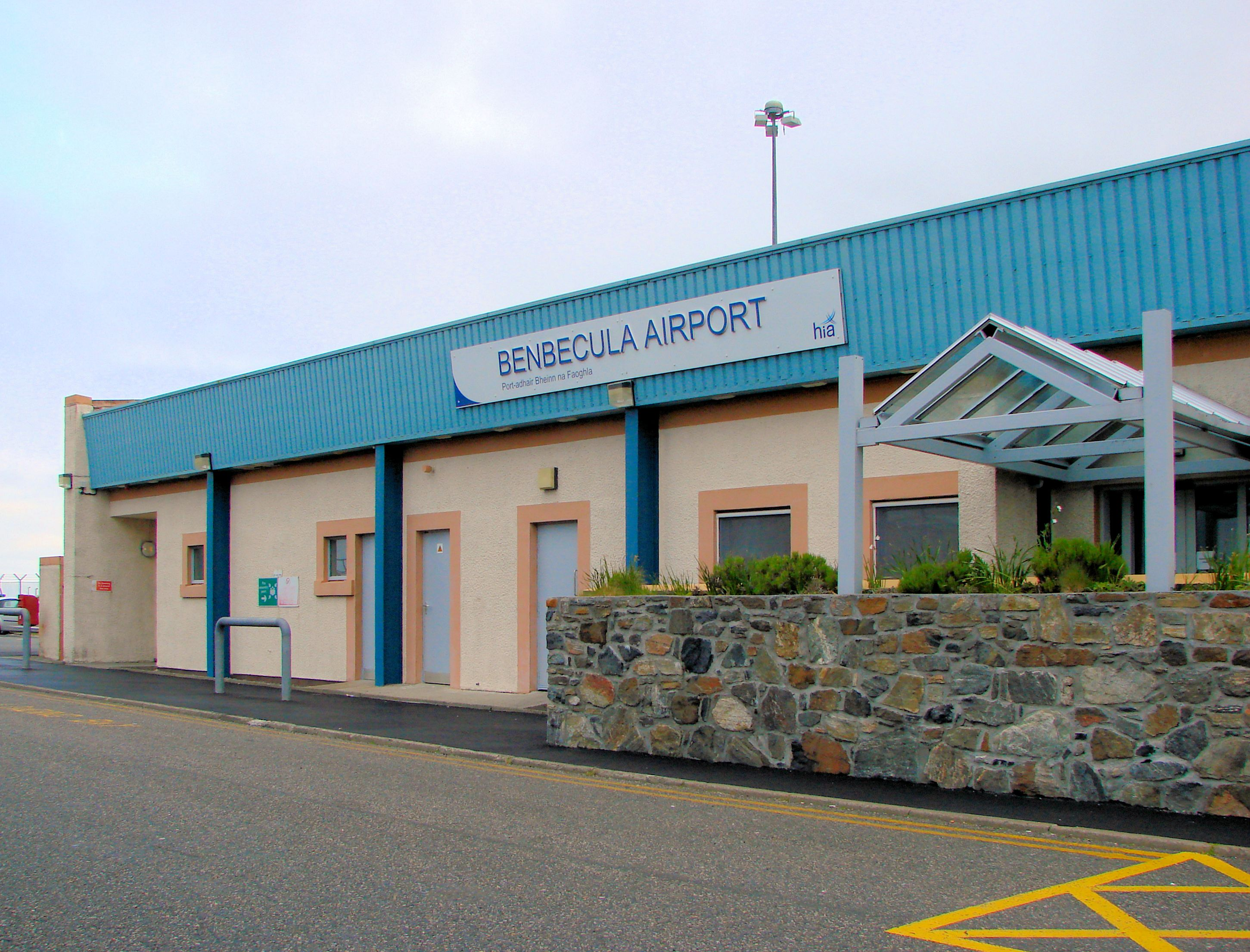
Benbecula in Balivanich airport reception building

Several private taxi services complement the bus traffic. In addition, there is a scheduled door to door transport service for the elderly and those with restricted mobility, driving to shops, banks, post offices and other important amenities with minibuses.

=== Education ===
Since the old primary school was badly damaged during a storm, children from Balivanich and the surrounding communities have been attending the new Balivanich School (Sgoil Bhaile a' Mhanaich) since August 2011. About 140 boys and girls aged 1 – 12 years old are cared for or taught there in 3 preschool and 6 primary school classes. A secondary school is located in the neighbouring town of Liniclate.

=== Airport ===
Benbecula Airport (Port Adhair Bheinn na Fadhla) (IATA: BEB, ICAO: EGPL) is located on the northern edge of the village. The operator is the Highlands and Islands Airports Limited based in Inverness.

Operations include scheduled flights to the Mainland (Inverness via Stornoway and Glasgow International) and mail cargo flights. In addition, the airport is used, due to its central location close to the hospital, as a landing site for rescue helicopters and aircraft. Some land is also used for the Royal Air Force to refuel and for transport and logistics purposes.
