= Benbecula Distillery =

Scotch whisky distillery at Gramsdale on the Isle of Benbecula

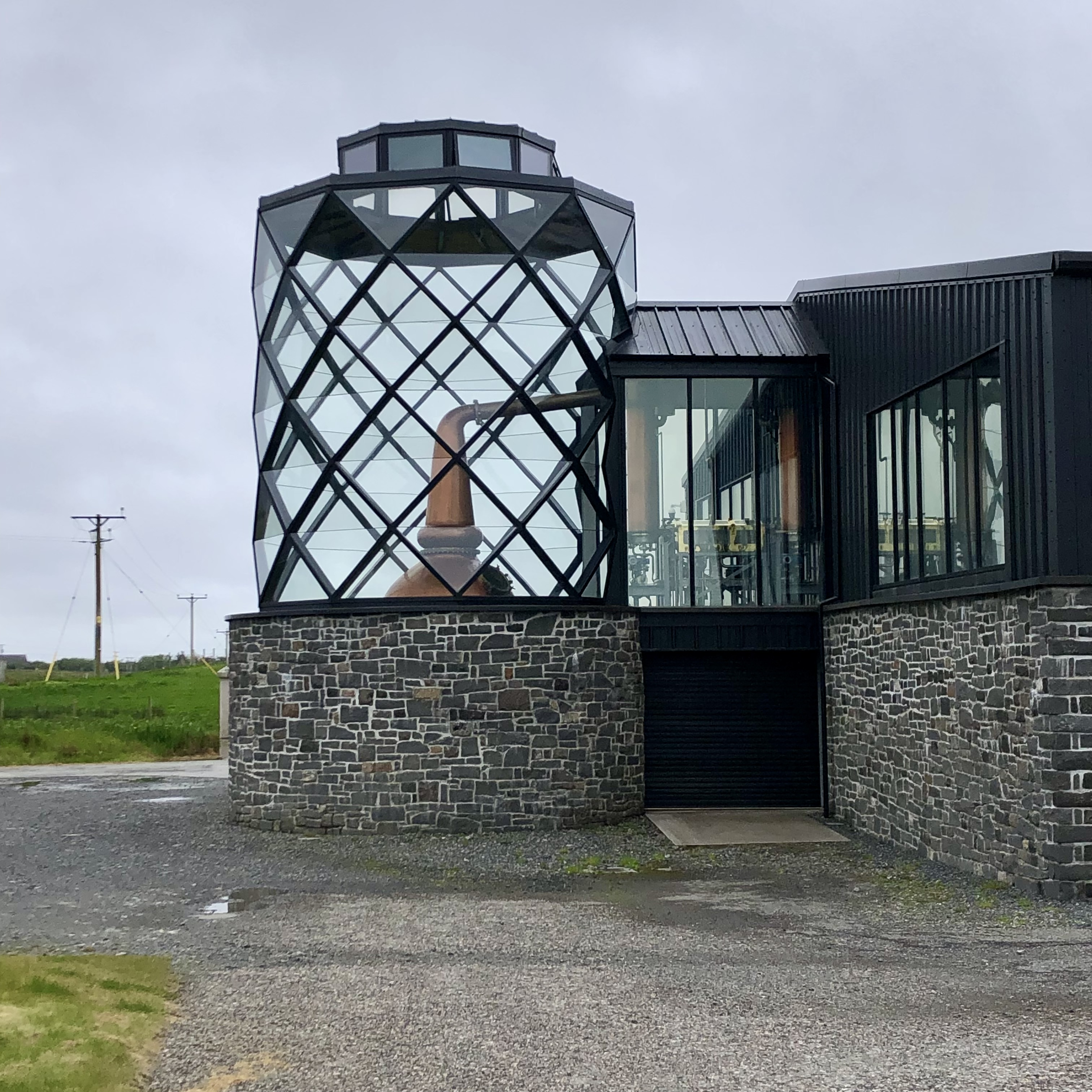
- Exterior view

Region: Island
- Location: Isle of Benbecula, Outer Hebrides, Scotland
- Coordinates: 57.446°N 7.320°W
- Founder: Angus MacMillan
- Architect: Organic Architects
- Status: Operational
- No. of stills: 1 wash 1 spirit
- Capacity: 350,000 litres a year
- Website: https://benbeculadistillery.com/

Benbecula Distillery (Benbecula)

Benbecula Distillery is a Scotch whisky distillery at Gramsdale on the Isle of Benbecula, Outer Hebrides, Scotland. Developed in a converted salmon-processing plant, the site produced its first spirit in June 2024. The project, founded by islander Angus A MacMillan, includes a glass, lighthouse-style stillroom – echoing the Stevenson Lighthouse on nearby Shillay, Monach Islands – and revives a 19th-century single-malt recipe described by Alfred Barnard. Coverage cites an expected annual capacity of about 350,000 litres of alcohol. It has received support from Highlands and Islands Enterprise as well as from the British Business Bank's Investment Fund for Scotland, with the fund's first investment into the Scottish Highlands and Islands.

== History ==
Plans for a distillery at Gramsdale were announced in 2020 by the Uist Distilling Company, with proposals for single malt whisky, rum and gin production and a visitor facility. In 2022 the Uist Distilling Company changed its name to MacMillan Spirits Co Ltd.

== Facilities and production ==
The distillery occupies a converted industrial site at the northern end of Benbecula. The glass extension houses the copper pot still and the design is the work of Organic Architects. Construction was led by local contractor MacInnes Brothers, and equipment was sourced from within the Highlands and Islands. Production uses locally sourced ingredients including bere barley grown on crofts on Benbecula, fertilised with seaweed, with local peat and heather used in the process. Early reports describe an intended "classically maritime" spirit profile. Maturation is in bourbon and sherry wood. Private cask sales will only be available in the first three years of production. First bottling and availability of the whisky is expected in 2029.

== People ==
Founder Angus A MacMillan led the project with distiller Brendan McCarron engaged in production.
