= Scourian orogeny =

The Scourian orogeny was an orogeny mountain building event 2.6 billion years ago during the Archean before the beginning of the Laxfordian orogeny (or potentially overlapping with the beginning of the Laxfordian).

The orogeny is marked by northwest–southeast trending folds south of Laxford in northwest Scotland. The event affected the Lewisian gneiss. Rubidium-strontium dating indicated Scourian metamorphism took place between 2.6 and 2.7 billion years ago
