= Uachdar =

Coordinates: 57.479°N 7.339°W

Uachdar: Scottish Gaelic: An t-Uachdar
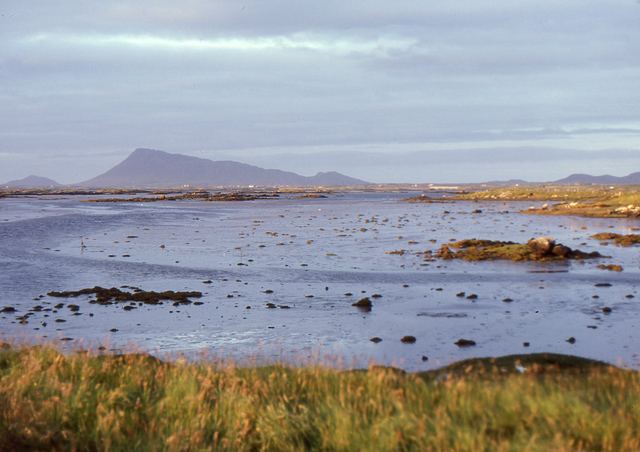
- View across a tidal loch near Uachdar

- Location within the Outer Hebrides
- Language: Scottish Gaelic; English
- OS grid reference: NF800557
- Civil parish: South Uist
- Council area: Na h-Eileanan Siar
- Lieutenancy area: Western Isles
- Country: Scotland
- Sovereign state: United Kingdom
- Post town: BENBECULA
- Postcode district: HS7
- Dialling code: 01871
- Police: Scotland
- Fire: Scottish
- Ambulance: Scottish
- UK Parliament: Na h-Eileanan an Iar
- Scottish Parliament: Na h-Eileanan an Iar

Uachdar (Scottish Gaelic: An t-Uachdar [ən̪ˠ ˈt̪ʰuəxkəɾ]) is a settlement on the Outer Hebridean Island of Benbecula. Uachdar is within the parish of South Uist.

The settlement is home to the only bakery on Benbecula, MacLeans Hebridean Bakery, which also has a small shop in the same complex as the bakery itself.
