= Flodaigh Mòr =

Uninhabited island in the Outer Hebrides of Scotland

Flodaigh (Gaelic)

Location
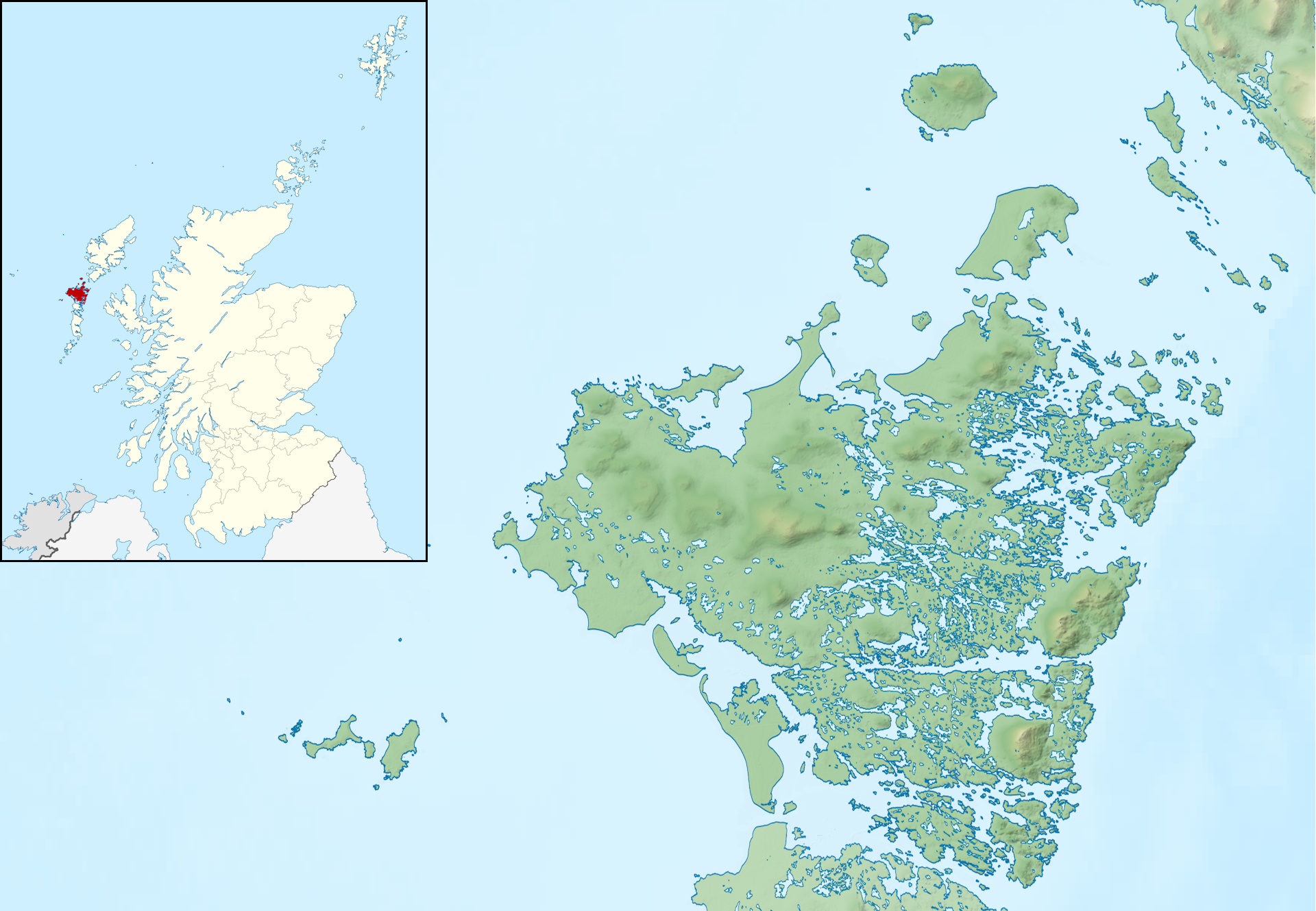
- Flodaigh Mòr shown next to North Uist Flodaigh Mòr shown within the Outer Hebrides
- OS grid reference: NF913570
- Coordinates: 57.50°N 7.15°W

Name
- Name meaning: "big raft island", from Norse

Physical geography
- Island group: Uists and Barra
- Area: 58 ha (140 acres)
- Area rank: 186
- Highest elevation: 28 m (92 ft)

Administration
- Council area: Na h-Eileanan Siar
- Country: Scotland
- Sovereign state: United Kingdom

Demographics
- Population: 0

Flodaigh Mòr (or Floddaymore) is an uninhabited island in the Outer Hebrides of Scotland.

== Geography and geology ==
Flodaigh Mòr lies east of North Uist, close offshore to Ronay. It contains a large freshwater loch (with its own islets). The eastern headland (Rubha nan Caorach) is almost detached. To the north, skerries almost connect to Floddaybeg.
