= Ronay =

Island in the Outer Hebrides of Scotland

Rònaigh (Gaelic)

Location
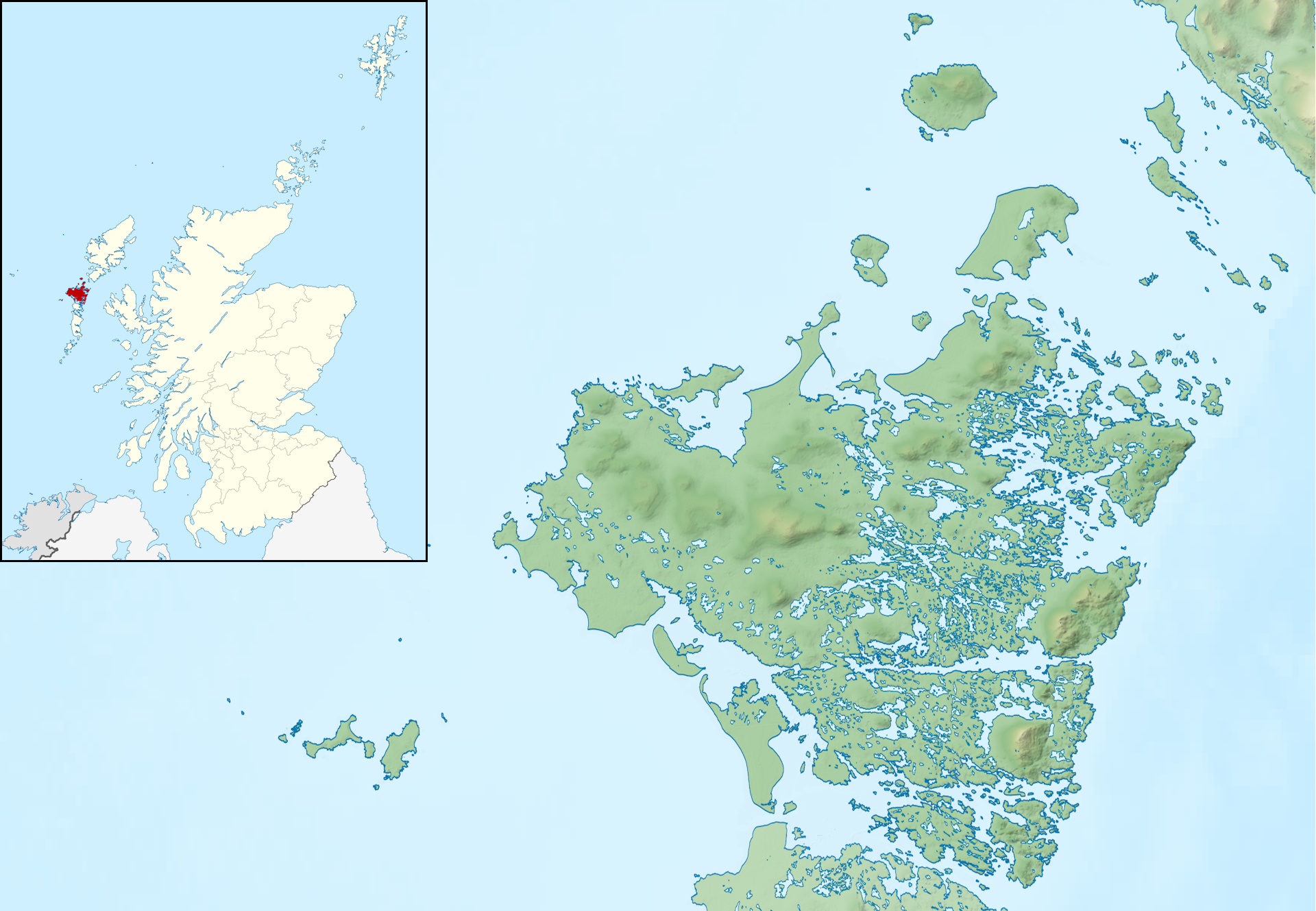
- Ronay shown next to North Uist Ronay shown within the Outer Hebrides
- OS grid reference: NF895555
- Coordinates: 57.48°N 7.18°W

Name
- Name meaning: "Rough island" from Norse
- Old Norse name: Hrauney

Physical geography
- Island group: Uist and Barra
- Area: 563 ha (1,390 acres)
- Area rank: 69
- Highest elevation: Beinn á Charnain 115 m

Administration
- Council area: Na h-Eileanan Siar
- Country: Scotland
- Sovereign state: United Kingdom

Demographics
- Population: uninhabited since 1920s

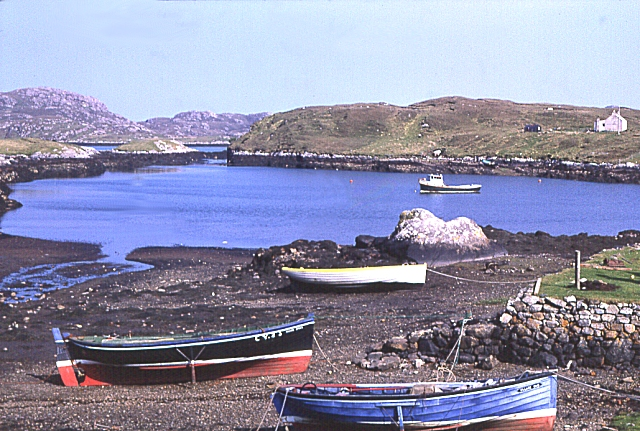
Bagh Mòr on Grimsay, with Ronay in distance

Ronay (Scottish Gaelic: Rònaigh) is an island in the Outer Hebrides of Scotland, which lies a short distance off the east coast of Grimsay.

== Geography ==
Ronay has a highly indented coastline with Bàgh nan Uamh being the biggest up in the north west. The island is surrounded by many smaller ones including Eilean na Cloiche in the south east, Eilean an Fhèidh in the east, Flodaigh Mòr in the north east, Haunaray to the north, and Garbh Eilean Mòr between it and Grimsay.

The north forms a peninsula called Rònaigh Beag, or little Ronay. The central section contains some seven or more lochs, which provide a freshwater supply.

The entire island is rough, covered in outcrops and knolls, which may have been partly eroded by overgrazing. There are three main peaks, the Beinn Rodagraich range 99 metres (325 ft) in the south, the Beinn a' Chàrnain range in the east 115 metres (377 ft) which incorporates Cnoc Mòr and Beinn an t-Sagairt, and the third in Ronaigh Beag, which rises to 74 metres (243 ft).

== History ==
Like many Scottish islands, Ronay appears to have ancient Celtic church connections. In the north west, there is a headland (Rubha) and mountain (Beinn) of the priest (an t-sagairt), and a Rubha na Manach (monk's headland) in the south west. Martin Martin also mentions a chapel:

"in the Island Rona, called the Low-landers Chappel, because Seamen who dye in times of Fishing, are buried in that place."

This chapel was pre-Reformation. It is also possible that the island's name refers to St Ronan, as that of North Rona does. In the centre, there are several names related to "Druidhneach" (possibly druids), such as Loch nan Druidhneach. Such names often refer to Neolithic remains.

Other historical references occur in the island's names, such as Bàgh Clann Neill in the west, Rubha Creag Mhic Fhionnlaigh and Bàgh na h-Eireannach in the north.

In 1826, there were 180 living on the island, but in 1831, the whole population was cleared to make way for sheep farming. See Highland Clearances. However, by 1841, 9 people were recorded, who may have moved back. The island was abandoned for good in 1931.

== Ownership ==
As of July 2025, the island is co-owned by Andrew Marshall.
