= Borve Castle, Benbecula =

Castle ruins in Benbecula, Scotland, UK

Coordinates: 57°25′49.97″N 7°22′37.99″W

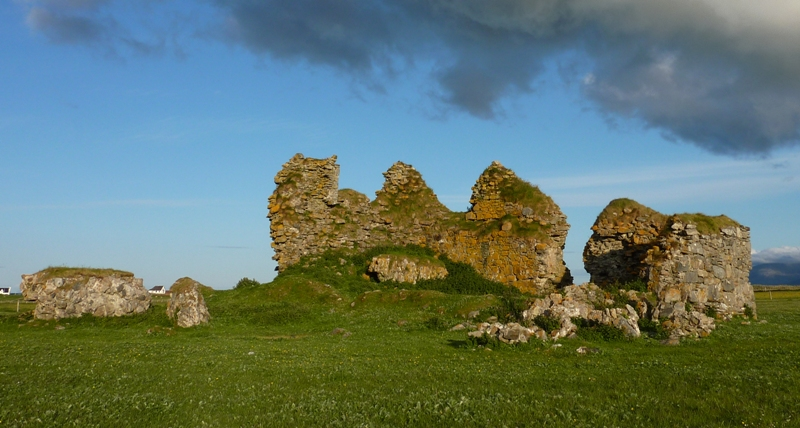
Borve Castle

Borve Castle, also known as Castle Wearie, and Caisteal Bhuirgh in Scottish Gaelic, is a ruined 14th-century tower house, located at the south-west of the island of Benbecula, in the Western Isles of Scotland. The castle was designated as a Scheduled Monument in 1993.

== History ==
MacGibbon and Ross attributed the building of the tower to Amie mac Ruari, wife of John of Islay, and dated it to between 1344 and 1363. It was occupied by the Macdonalds of Benbecula until the early 17th century.

== Description ==
The ruined rubble-built three-storey tower measures 18.9 metres (62 ft) by 11.3 metres (37 ft 1 in), and 9 metres (29 ft 6 in) high. The walls average 2.75 metres (9 ft) thick, although they narrow internally at the first- and second-storey level. The north wall has almost entirely collapsed. The tower had at least two timber floors above the basement. Its entrance was through a projecting wing in the center of the south wall which opened into the first storey.

Archaeological investigations in 2018 have revealed that the tower was built in three distinct phases. The first was a structure with narrow masonry walls in a formal style with regular courses and sandstone quoins. Next, the eastern side of the castle was reinforced with very wide walls of a moderately formal style with large stones and intermittent coursing, forming an outer skin without windows to the existing structure. Later much the same was done on the western side although in an informal manner without coursing. The western wall had many windows.

== See also ==
- Borve Castle, Sutherland a castle of the same name which belonged to the Clan Mackay in Sutherland.
