= Fraoch Eilean, Loch Lomond =

Island in Loch Lomond, Scotland

Coordinates: 56°5′56″N 4°37′39″W

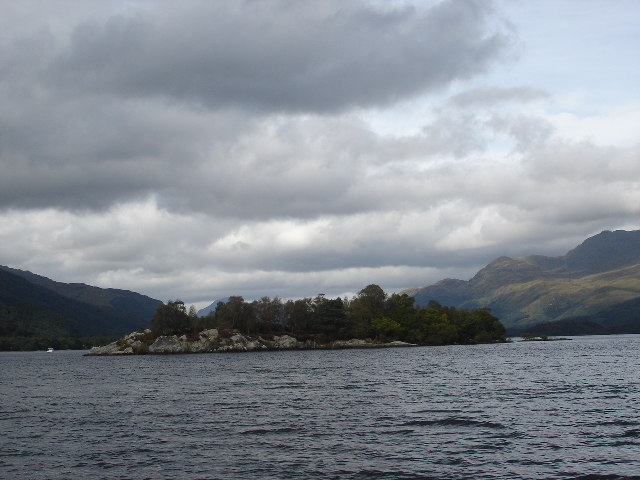

Fraoch Eilean is a small island in Loch Lomond, Scotland. Its name means "heather island" in Scottish Gaelic.

It is near Luss on the mainland, and according to legend, was used as its prison, indeed on Charles Ross's 1792 Plan of Dunbartonshire, Loch Lomond and its Environs, Fraoch Eilean is marked as "Luss Prison".

It is covered in heather and brambles.
