= Laxfordian orogeny =

Geologic event

The Laxfordian orogeny was an orogenic (mountain building) event between 1.9 and 1 billion years ago. It primarily affected the North Atlantic Craton, in particular a section that cleaved off during the Mesozoic as the Scottish Shield Fragment, part of the Lewisian complex within the Hebridean terrane.

The event produced deformation and high-grade metamorphism, migmatite formation and the emplacement granite and pegmatite in the Loch Maree Group basement rocks between 1.9 and 1.8 billion years ago. From 1.6 to 1.4 billion years ago, brittle folds formed followed by crush belts in the final phase of the orogeny. Laxfordian orogenic belts have many similarities to the Nagssugtoqidian mobile belt in Greenland. The Laxfordian orogeny was followed by the Grenville orogeny.
