= Grimsay =

Tidal island in the Outer Hebrides of Scotland

Griomasaigh (Gaelic)

Location
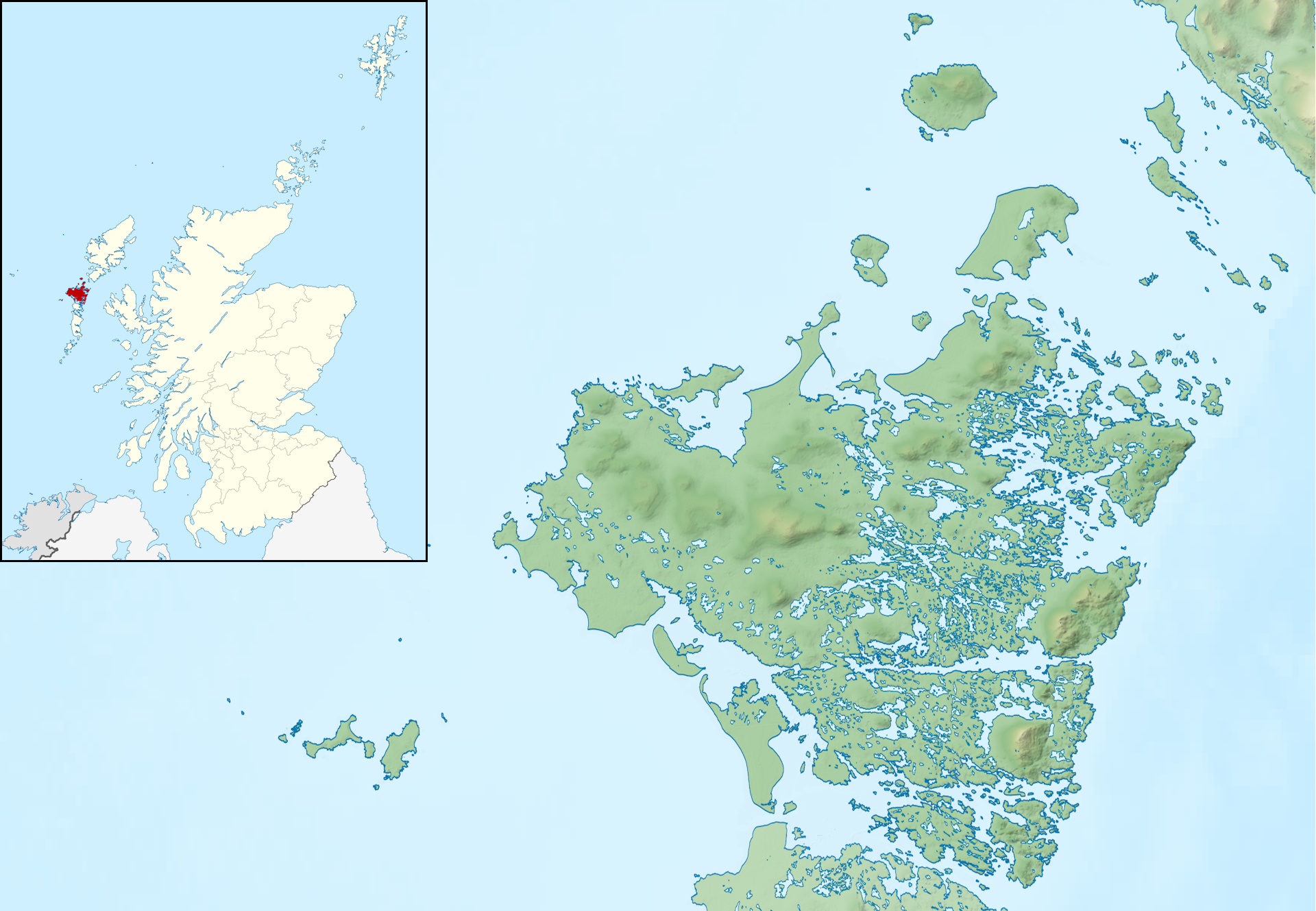
- Grimsay shown next to North Uist Grimsay shown within the Outer Hebrides
- OS grid reference: NF855572
- Coordinates: 57.49°N 7.24°W

Name
- Name meaning: ON: Grim's Island
- Old Norse name: Grímsey

Physical geography
- Island group: Uist and Barra
- Area: 833 ha (3 1/4 sq mi)
- Area rank: 58
- Highest elevation: 22 m (72 ft)

Administration
- Council area: Outer Hebrides
- Country: Scotland
- Sovereign state: United Kingdom

Demographics
- Population: 149
- Population rank: 40
- Population density: 18/km^{2} (47/sq mi)
- Largest settlement: Bàgh Mòr and Ceallan

Grimsay (Scottish Gaelic: Griomasaigh) is a tidal island in the Outer Hebrides of Scotland.

== Geography ==
Grimsay is the largest of the low-lying stepping-stones which convey the Oitir Mhòr (North Ford) causeway, a 5-mile (8-kilometre) arc of single track road linking North Uist and Benbecula via the western tip of Grimsay. Until it opened in 1960, a ferry linked Carinish (on North Uist) with Gramsdale (on Benbecula), but could only operate at high tide. There was also a ford which could only be crossed close to low water, usually only with a guide. For significant parts of each day the North Ford was too wet to ford and not wet enough to cross by ferry. East of Grimsay lie several smaller islands including Ronay which was inhabited until 1931.

== Inhabitants ==
The island's population was 169 as recorded by the 2011 census, a drop of over 15% from 2001 when there were 201 usual residents. During the same period Scottish island populations as a whole grew by 4% to 103,702. By 2022 the population was recorded as 149. (Note: In 2001 and 2011 the nearby island of Seana Bhaile's population was included in the totals for Grimsay. In 2022 the census recorded this figure separately, which at that time totalled 15. The net decrease in Grimsay's population from 2011 to 2022 was thus only about 5.) The main settlements are Baymore (Bàgh Mòr) and Kallin (Ceallan) at the eastern end of the island. Grimsay has a harbour at Kallin, which is the base for a sizeable shellfish industry, the island's main industry, mostly for lobster, prawns and scallops. Also in Kallin is The Boatshed, a marine repair facility which promotes traditional skills, and employs a full-time boatbuilder and trainee. Three generations of Stewart family built as many as 1,000 boats from three sheds on Grimsay. Grimsay is encircled by a single-track road that links most of the island's small croft and fishing settlements together.

== History ==
There is a fine example of an Iron-Age wheelhouse on the northeast coast of the island at Bàgh nam Feadag. It is one of the best examples of a wheelhouse in the North Uist area but does not appear on Ordnance Survey maps.

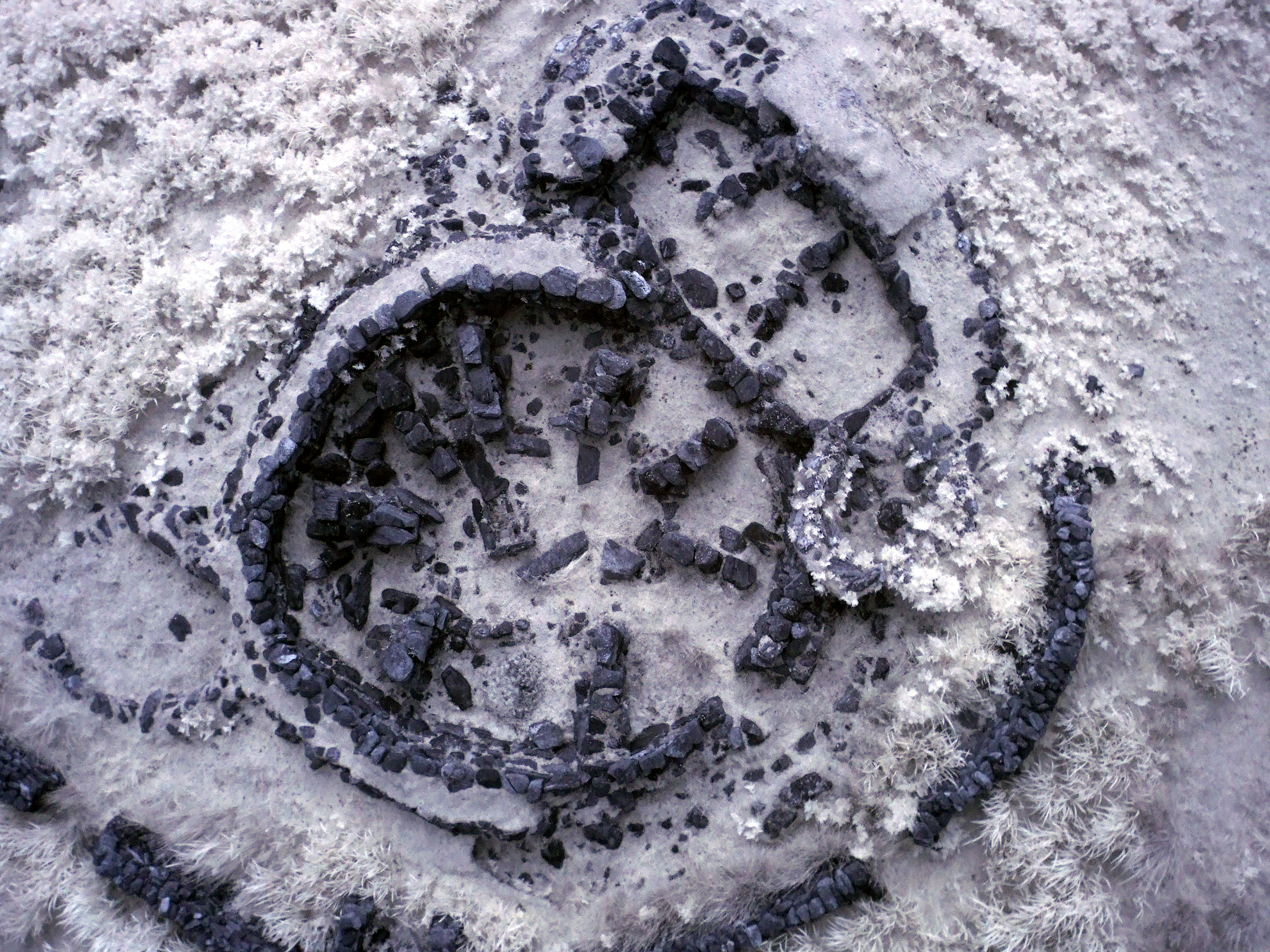
A near infrared view of Grimsay Wheelhouse.

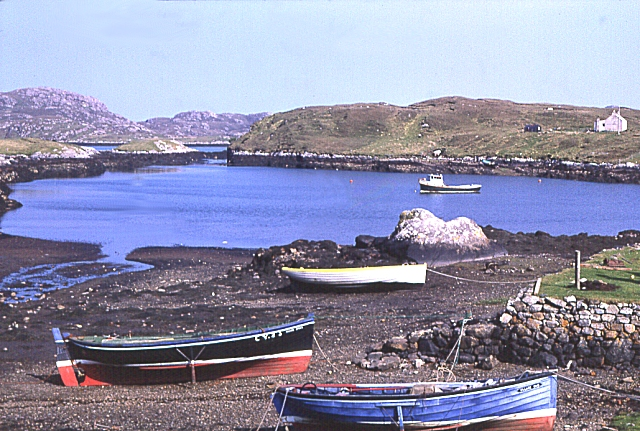
Bagh Mòr on Grimsay, with Ronay in distance

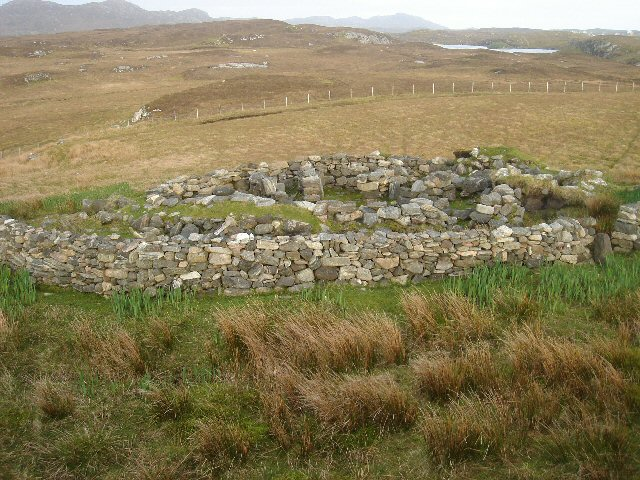
A wheelhouse on Grimsay
